= Florida State Road 249 =

State highway in Florida, United States

State Road 249 and County Road 249

Route information
- Maintained by FDOT, Suwannee, and Hamilton County DPWs.

Major junctions
- South end: US 27 / US 129 / SR 20 in Branford
- US 90 / SR 10 in Live Oak
- North end: US 41 / US 129 / SR 51 in Jasper

Location
- Country: United States
- State: Florida

Highway system
- Florida State Highway System; Interstate; US; State; Former; Pre‑1945; Toll; Scenic
← SR 247	→ SR 253

State Road 249 (SR 249) is the state designation for U.S. Route 129 between US 27(SR 20) in Branford and US 90(SR 10) in Live Oak. It also includes a bi-county extension in Suwannee County, Florida from Live Oak across the Suwannee River to Jasper in Hamilton County.

== Route description ==
=== Branford into Live Oak ===
State Road 249 begins in Branford, Florida where US 129 turns north from the west end of its concurrency with US 27, while US 27 continues west across the Frank R. Norris Bridge over the Suwannee River into Grady towards Mayo, Perry, Tallahassee, and beyond. North of US 27, the first major intersection is State Road 247, which takes motorists northeast to western Lake City. The Suwannee River Greenway returns to the west side of SR 249 (US 129) as both leave the Branford City Limits, but makes a sharp left turn at the intersection of CR 248, which follows the south side of that road into a dead end at Little River Springs. The same abandoned railroad line that was originally owned by Atlantic Coast Line Railroad and used by that trail continues to hug the west side of Route 249 until it enters McAlpin. Between 170th Terrace and Aven Road, the road veers to the right and then curves back in the opposite direction as it climbs an embankment for a bridge over the previously mentioned abandoned railroad line. After descending from this bridge, it intersects with a brief overlap with CR 252. Between the end of this concurrency and 144th Street, it curves straight north again.

Within the historic City of Live Oak the road is named Ohio Avenue, and continues to run in a straight south-to-north line. But at 111th Street, hidden SR 249 is officially joined by State Road 51, which also includes a multiplex with CR 136. It is at this point the street begins to shift to the northeast. Roughly two blocks later, the road encounters CR 10A (Helvenston Street Southeast). Further downtown it becomes the location for the Old Live Oak Post Office, and later, the Suwannee County Courthouse. The official end of the US 129/SR 51/SR 136/SR 249 multiplex is at U.S. Route 90 (hidden SR 10), where SR 249 joins westbound US 90 for four blocks along West Howard Street until it reaches Houston Avenue. From there the route turns right and becomes County Road 249.

=== Live Oak to the Suwannee River ===
One block after leaving US 90, it crosses the railroad tracks between Corner Street Northwest and West Fourth Street Northwest, which were used by Amtrak's Sunset Limited until it was truncated to New Orleans by Hurricane Katrina in 2005. The road's first traffic signal as an independent route is Duval Street Northwest. After it enters the Boys Ranch section of the city, CR 249 branches off to the northwest at a fork in the road onto Nobles Ferry Road, while the new designation for Houston Avenue becomes CR 795. Beyond the city limits, CR 249 is surrounded by farmland, much of which is obstructed by trees along the road. It also maintains the same trajectory as in Live Oak, although at some point there's a slight reverse curve to the left. The road takes a more northerly angle, albeit still northwest as it approaches a two lane bridge over Interstate 10 with no access.

Between 48th Street and 46th Street, the road begins to curve more to the northwest, and encounters more forested areas than south of I-10, although farm fields can still be found here. One intersection in this area is another encounter with CR 795 (145th Road), which despite technically being the northern terminus of the route, actually runs in the opposite direction. The next moderate intersection after this is bi-county CR 132 (Stagecoach Road), which spans east and west through northern Suwannee County from US 90 at Suwannee River State Park, through US 129 in Suwannee Springs. As the road approaches 16th Street, it curves from the northwest to the northeast, and the farmland gives way to forestland until it curves straight north and encounters some smaller farm fields. The last two intersections in the county are two side roads; 167th Street a grass road which forks off to the left and 8th Terrace, a paved road which forks off to the right and leads to Plantation Road. From there the road curves slightly to the northwest and enters more forest land. The forest surrounding the approach to the bridge over the Suwannee River makes the bridge itself hardly noticeable until you're on the verge of crossing it and it enters the Suwannee-Hamilton County Line.

=== Gibson County Park to Jasper ===
On the Hamilton County side of the river, CR 249 is named Northwest 63rd Avenue, and it approaches a boat ramp for Gibson County Park on the northwest side of the bridge, and a truck weigh station on the northeast side, where even pickups and vans are required to use them along with much larger trucks and tractor-trailers. The road crosses a straight north and south dirt path. At Southwest 67th Drive, CR 249 makes a right turn and Northwest 63rd Avenue becomes County Road 751. CR 249 becomes the northern terminus of the same dirt path it intersected earlier, while it briefly runs close to the south bank of the Alapaha River until that river moves away from the road, which then heads northeast into Adams, where it momentarily turns east. At Southwest 92nd Drive, the road curves northeast before the intersection with County Road 158, a road leading to Marion.

Just as it did with I-10 in Suwannee County, CR 249 approaches a bridge over Interstate 75 with no access. From there the road turns straight north before approaching the intersection of Southwest 51st Way only to make a sharp turn to the east again as it goes over a bridge over Tiger Creek. Along this segment it turns northeast again as it passes the Hamilton Correctional Institute, and then makes another sharp turn to the north before entering the City of Jasper and turning east one last time as it becomes Martin Luther King Drive. Here the road has one other moderate intersection with CR 152 (15th Avenue Northwest/Southwest), and later Central Avenue Southwest and Southeast which a former railroad right-of-way in between, and the Jasper Post Office on the northeast corner. Two blocks later, the route finally terminates at US 41/129 (hidden SRs 25/51/100; Second Avenue Southeast), two of the very routes it encountered in Southern and Central Suwannee County. However MLK Drive continues east towards a Georgia Southern and Florida Railway line, and then northwest into CR 6.

== Major intersections ==
County	Location	mi	km	Destinations	Notes
Suwannee	Branford	0.00	0.00	US 27 north / SR 20 west / US 129 south – Perry, Niceville	North end of US 27 overlap; South end of US 129 overlap
Suwannee	Branford	0.246	0.396	SR 247 (West Plant Street) – Lake City	
Suwannee	Live Oak	24.178	38.911	SR 51 south / CR 136 west (111th Street) – Steinhatchee, Dowling Park	South end of SR 51 / CR 136 overlap
Suwannee	Live Oak	24.639	39.653	US 90 / SR 10 east (East Howard Street) / US 129 / SR 51 north (North Ohio Avenue) – Jacksonville Beach, Jasper	South end of US 90 overlap; North end of US 129 overlap
Suwannee	Live Oak	24.926	40.115	US 90 west / SR 10 (West Howard Street)	North end of US 90 overlap; SR 249 becomes CR 249
Suwannee		33.426	53.794	CR 132 – Ellaville, Suwannee Springs	
Suwannee—Hamilton county line		37.126	59.749	Suwannee River Crossing	
Hamilton		37.526	60.392	CR 751 north (Northwest 63rd Avenue) – Crossroads	
Hamilton		44.126	71.014	CR 158 east – Marion	
Hamilton	Jasper	49.526	79.704	US 41 / SR 25 / US 129 / SR 100 north	North end of CR 249
1.000 mi = 1.609 km; 1.000 km = 0.621 mi: Concurrency terminus; Route transition
