= U.S. Route 129 in Florida =

Segment of American highway

U.S. Highway 129
- US 129 highlighted in red

Route information
- Auxiliary route of US 29
- Maintained by FDOT
- Length: 87.881 mi (141.431 km)
- Existed: 1941–present

Major junctions
- South end: US 19 / US 27 Alt. / US 98 in Chiefland
- US 27 in Branford; US 90 in Live Oak; I-10 near Live Oak; I-75 in Marion; US 41 / SR 6 in Jasper
- North end: US 129 / SR 11 near Statenville, GA

Location
- Country: United States
- State: Florida
- Counties: Levy, Gilchrist, Suwannee, Hamilton

Highway system
- United States Numbered Highway System; List; Special; Divided; Florida State Highway System; Interstate; US; State; Former; Pre‑1945; Toll; Scenic
← SR 128	→ SR 129

U.S. Route 129 (US 129) in Florida is a north–south United States Highway. It runs 88 miles (142 km) from Chiefland north to the Georgia State Line in Levy, Gilchrist, Suwannee, and Hamilton Counties.

The secret designation for US 129 in Florida, between Chiefland and Hildreth is SR 49 (SR 49). Between Hildreth and Branford, it follows SR 20, between Branford and Live Oak, it follows SR 249, between Live Oak and Jasper, it follows SR 51, between Hillcoat and Jasper, it follows SR 25, and between Hillcoat and the Georgia border, it follows SR 100. The only signed concurrencies that exist are with US 27 between Hildreth and Branford, with US 41 between Hillcoat and Jasper, and with SR 6 in Jasper.

== Route description ==
=== Levy and Gilchrist Counties ===
US 129 begins just northwest of the southeastern terminus of the US 19-98-27 ALT concurrency in Chiefland. The road is concurrent with hidden SR 49, running northeast until it reaches Northwest 30th Avenue and turns straight north where it remains through the rest of Levy County.

A few blocks after crossing the Levy-Gilchrist County line, US 129 enters Trenton, where it curves briefly to the northeast at Southwest 10th Avenue, only to return directly north at the northern terminus of County Road 339 where the road becomes South Main Street, which contains such historic sites as the Trenton Church of Christ and the Gilchrist County Courthouse. The four corners of Trenton can be found at SR 26, which becomes West Wade Street on the west side and East Wade Street on the east side, while US 129 changes from South Main Street to North Main Street. Further north in the vicinity of Fourth Avenue and Lancaster Avenue the former Atlantic Coast Line Depot serves as the trailhead of the Trenton-Newberry Rail Trail.

At a fork in the road, SR 47 branches off to the northeast toward Lake City, while US 129 turns to the northwest. North of the Trenton city limits, US 129 passes by the Trenton Fire Tower near Joppa Lake. After the intersection with CR 344, the road turns straight north again at CR 307, just south of the Sam Whet Farms Airport.

In Bell, the only major intersection is CR 342, which runs west to CR 341, although the northern border of the town is at the intersection of Northwest 20th Street, which is CR 236, and also leads to CR 341. North of the town limits, the road intersects CR 340, which is a tri-county road spanning from SR 349 in northeastern Dixie County to Monteocha in Alachua County. The last routed intersection with US 129 in Gilchrist County is CR 138, but the last intersection in general is Northwest 117th Place, which is just south of the bridge over the Santa Fe River, where it enters Suwannee County.

=== Suwannee County, including Branford and Live Oak ===
From the Santa Fe River Bridge, the first intersection is 296th Street, and all subsequent intersections are equally minor until it reaches Hildreth, where it crosses the Suwannee River Greenway Trail, then encounters the east end of a concurrency with US 27 (hidden SR 20) which is also the northern terminus of SR 49 and the southern terminus of CR 49. US 27-129 and the trail enter the hamlet of Wachtokha, but the trail remains straight while the road curves slightly to the northwest. A slight curve to the southwest is where both routes officially enter Branford, Florida where US 129 turns north onto Hidden SR 249, while US 27 continues west across the Frank R. Norris Bridge over the Suwannee River into Grady towards Mayo, Perry, Tallahassee, and beyond. North of US 27, the first major intersection is SR 247, which takes motorists northeast to western Lake City. The Suwannee River Greenway returns to the west side of US 129 as both leave the Branford City Limits, but makes a sharp left turn at the intersection of CR 248, which follows the south side of that road into a dead end at Little River Springs. The same abandoned railroad line that was originally owned by Atlantic Coast Line Railroad and used by that trail continues to hug the west side of US 129 until it enters McAlpin. Between 170th Terrace and Aven Road, the road veers to the right and then curves back in the opposite direction as it climbs an embankment for a bridge over the previously mentioned abandoned railroad line. After descending from this bridge, it intersects with a brief concurrency with CR 252, Between the end of this concurrency and 144th Street, it curves straight north again.

Within the historic Live Oak the road is named Ohio Avenue, and continues to run in a straight south-to-north line. But at 111th Street, hidden SR 249 is officially joined by SR 51, which also includes an overlap of CR 136. It is at this point the street begins to shift to the northeast. Roughly two blocks later, the road encounters CR 10A(Helvenston Street Southeast). Further downtown it becomes the location for the Old Live Oak Post Office, and later, the Suwannee County Courthouse. The official end of the US 129/SR 51/SR 136/SR 249 concurrency is at US 90(hidden SR 10), where SR 249 joins westbound US 90 for four blocks until it reaches Houston Avenue. As with Trenton, the intersection serves as the city's four corners, because US 129's name changes from South Ohio Avenue to North Ohio Avenue, and US 90's name changes from West Howard Street to East Howard Street.

One block later, it crosses the railroad tracks where the historic Union Depot and Atlantic Coast Line Freight Station can be found, and the Old Live Oak City Hall can be found on the next block. It is here where the concurrency with SR 136 ends at West Duval Street Northeast. Before leaving the city limits, the road finally becomes four lanes wide and eventually gains a divider as commercial development begins to dot the landscape, serving as an indicator that it is designed to accommodate motorists from the nearby Interstate 10, and sure enough, the road finally has a diamond interchange with I-10 at exit 283. The four lane divided segment finally ends north of there, although a right-of-way for a future northbound lane can be seen on the east side of the road for the equivalent of several blocks. The only intersection of note in this area is with the western terminus of CR 136A, a suffixed alternate of SR 136, which is also named "County Road 136 Scenic." The road enters Suwannee Springs, where it meets the intersection with CR 132, and secretly takes it north. Just before crossing over the Suwannee River bridge and entering Hamilton County, not only does a former segment of the road veer off to the right and lead to an abandoned 1931-built bridge, but a pair of truck weigh stations can be found on both sides of the road. US 129 winds to the left of the old bridge and then curves right over the river as it enters Hamilton County.

=== Hamilton County to the Georgia State Line ===
Unlike in Suwannee County, only a hint of the right-of-way of the former segment of US 129 can be found before the road turns straight north before letting go of its overlap with CR 132, which runs east. Further north it enters the unincorporated community of Marion, where it serves as the eastern terminus of CR 158. US 129 then approaches a Love's truck stop and a pair of quarter-cloverleaf ramps on the southeast and northwest corners above its interchange with I-75 at exit 451. Beyond I-75, it passes through Hillcoat, which is the site of Hamilton County High School and later where US 129 joins US 41/hidden SRs 25 and 100. The newly concurrent routes briefly run straight north before making a reverse curve around the left side of Roberts Pond and Shaky Pond before entering Jasper. US 41-129-SR 100 turns west onto SR 6(Hatley Street), which becomes CR 6 east of the intersection, while hidden SR 51 becomes CR 51 (Second Avenue Northeast) north of the same intersection.

After Fifth Avenue, the road begins to curve to the northwest, and by 15th Avenue, the concurrency with US 41 and SRs 6 and 25 ends as those routes move to the west while US 129 curves off to the northwest, taking SR 100 away from US 41. Resuming its northward agenda, which US 41 will do further on, US 129/SR 100 runs through the forests of northern Florida interrupted by the occasional private house and farmland. The only real intersection of any significance it encounters is CR 148 in Rawls, where it also crosses the same Georgia Southern and Florida Railway line that followed US 41 from Lake City. North of there, farm fields become a more common site.

Whatever farmland exists disappears near the intersection of a dirt road named Northwest 25th Drive, and the rest of the journey becomes pure forest land with occasional local dirt road intersections. This trend continues until one clearings near Northwest 13th Street. One more paved road intersects with US 129 in the form of CR 150 near Avoca, and just north of there the road crosses a bridge over Alligator Creek, and one last named intersection with Northwest 86th Avenue. After passing by one last farm field, the surroundings become quite wooded and picturesque. Two last unnamed dirt roads intersect US 129 before the road prepares to curve straight north one last time and upon completing the turn finally crosses the Florida–Georgia State line where SR 100 comes to an end, and Georgia State Route 11 begins. The border is defined by an intersection with an unnamed dirt road on the east side.

== History ==
A US 129 shield used in Florida prior to 1993

Always a spur of US 29, which begins much further west in Pensacola, US 129 entered Florida in 1941 in Jasper. By 1948, it went further south along US 41 to Hillcoat, where it branched off toward Live Oak and Branford, where it turned right along a brief wrong-way concurrency with US 27 over the Suwannee River and then turned south towards its former terminus at Old Town. Eleven years later, the segment south of Branford would be rerouted in the proper direction along US 27 and make a right turn along SR 49 toward Trenton and Chiefland, while the old US 129 would become US 129 Alternate (see below).

The 1931-built Suwannee Springs Bridge was abandoned in 1971, and replaced with the current bridge when US 129 was realigned.

Until US 27 Alternate was widened and the intersection with US 19-98 was redesigned in the early 21st century, US 129 also intersected with the south end of the US 19-98-27 ALT concurrency, as well as the west end of SR 500.

== Major intersections ==
County	Location	mi	km	Destinations	Notes
Levy	Chiefland	0.000	0.000	US 19 (SR 55) / US 27 Alt. / US 98 – Inglis, Cedar Key, St. Petersburg, Fanning Springs	
Levy		0.290	0.467	CR 321 north (Northwest 50th Avenue)	
Levy		2.081	3.349	CR 320 (Northwest 120th Street)	
Levy		2.789	4.488	CR 345 south (Northwest 30th Avenue)	south end of CR 345 overlap
Levy		3.315	5.335	CR 345 east (Northwest 130th Street)	north end of CR 345 overlap
Levy		4.320	6.952	CR 346 west (Northwest 140th Street)	south end of CR 346 overlap
Levy		5.344	8.600	CR 346 east (Northwest 150th Street)	north end of CR 346 overlap
Levy		6.326	10.181	CR 346A (Northwest 160th Street)	
Gilchrist	Trenton	9.371	15.081	CR 339 south (Bronson Highway) – Bronson	
Gilchrist	Trenton	9.931	15.982	SR 26 (Wade Street) – Fanning Springs, Newberry, Gainesville, Lancaster Correctional Institution	
Gilchrist	Trenton	10.272	16.531	SR 47 north – Fort White	
Gilchrist		14.003	22.536	CR 344 west – Hart Springs	
Gilchrist		14.918	24.008	CR 307 south	
Gilchrist		16.130	25.959	CR 232 west – Hart Springs Recreation Park	south end of CR 232 overlap
Gilchrist		18.127	29.173	CR 232 east	north end of CR 232 overlap
Gilchrist	Bell	20.351	32.752	CR 341 south (Strickland Avenue)	
Gilchrist	Bell	21.262	34.218	CR 236 west	
Gilchrist		23.262	37.437	CR 340	
Gilchrist		29.848	48.036	CR 138 east	
Santa Fe River				Bridge over the Santa Fe River	
Suwannee		34.075	54.838	US 27 south (SR 20) / CR 49 north – Fort White	north end of SR 49 overlap; south end of US 27 / SR 20 overlap
Suwannee	Branford	38.149	61.395	US 27 north (SR 20) to SR 349 – Mayo	north end of US 27 / SR 20 overlap; south end of SR 249 overlap
Suwannee	Branford	38.395	61.791	SR 247 north (West Plant Avenue) – Lake City	
Suwannee		41.224	66.344	CR 248 – Little River Springs	
Suwannee	O'Brien	43.912	70.670	CR 349 north – Royal Springs	
Suwannee	McAlpin	52.995	85.287	CR 252 east – Lake City	south end of CR 252 overlap
Suwannee		54.177	87.189	CR 252 west	north end of CR 252 overlap
Suwannee	Live Oak	62.327	100.306	SR 51 south (Eleventh Street) to CR 136 – Mayo, Dowling Park, National Guard Armory	north end of SR 249 overlap; south end of SR 51 overlap
Suwannee	Live Oak	62.788	101.047	US 90 (Howard Street / SR 10) – Madison, Lake City, Airport, Jacksonville, Mobile	
Suwannee	Live Oak	62.924	101.266	CR 136 east (Duval Street) – Stephen Foster Folk Center, White Springs	
Suwannee		65.50	105.41	I-10 (SR 8) – Tallahassee, Jacksonville	I-10 exit 283
Suwannee		67.320	108.341	CR 136A east	
Suwannee		69.567	111.957	CR 132 west to I-10 – Boys Ranch, Wellborn	
Suwannee River				Bridge over the Suwannee River	
Hamilton		71.336	114.804	CR 132 east	
Hamilton		73.421	118.160	CR 158 west	
Hamilton		74.15	119.33	I-75 (SR 93) – Lake City, Jennings, Valdosta, Atlanta	I-75 exit 451
Hamilton		76.954	123.845	US 41 south (SR 25 / SR 100) – White Springs	south end of US 41 / SR 25 / SR 100 overlap
Hamilton	Jasper	79.305	127.629	CR 6 east (Hatley Street)	north end of SR 51 overlap; south end of SR 6 overlap
Hamilton	Jasper	79.361	127.719	Northeast First Avenue (CR 51 north)	
Hamilton	Jasper	79.475	127.903	Southwest First Avenue (CR 249 south)	
Hamilton	Jasper	80.290	129.214	Northwest 15th Avenue (CR 152 south)	
Hamilton	Jasper	80.355	129.319	US 41 north / SR 6 west (SR 25 north) – Jennings	north end of US 41 / SR 6 / SR 25 overlap
Hamilton		86.203	138.730	CR 150 west	
Hamilton		87.881	141.431	US 129 north / SR 11 north – Statenville, Lakeland	Georgia state line
1.000 mi = 1.609 km; 1.000 km = 0.621 mi: Concurrency terminus

== Related routes ==
U.S. Highway 129 Alternate
- Location: Old Town-Branford
- Existed: 1959–1970

U.S. Route 129 Alternate (US 129 ALT) was a former segment of US 129 that ran from Old Town to Branford, almost entirely on the west side of the Suwannee River.

The road began at US 19-98-27 ALT in Old Town and ran north to US 27(SR 20) in Grady, where it turned east as both roads crossed the Suwannee River. US 129 ALT terminated at US 129, which joined US 27 until it reached Hildreth.

Today the segment between Old Town and Grady is SR 349, while the segment between Grady and Branford is simply US 27.

== See also ==
U.S. Route 129
Previous state: Terminus	Florida	Next state: Georgia
