= U.S. Route 129 =

Highway in the United States

U.S. Route 129
- US 129 highlighted in red

Route information
- Auxiliary route of US 29
- Length: 582 mi (937 km)

Major junctions
- South end: US 19 / US 27 Alt. / US 98 in Chiefland, FL
- I-10 near Live Oak, FL; I-75 near Jasper, FL; I-16 in Macon, GA; I-20 in Madison, GA; I-85 near Jefferson, GA; I-985 / US 23 / SR 365 in Gainesville, GA; US 19 / SR 9 in rural Lumpkin County, GA; US 64 / US 74 near Murphy, NC; US 19 / US 74 near Andrews, NC; I-140 in Alcoa, TN
- North end: I-40 in Knoxville, TN

Location
- Country: United States
- States: Florida, Georgia, North Carolina, Tennessee

Highway system
- United States Numbered Highway System; List; Special; Divided

U.S. Route 129 (US 129) is an auxiliary route of US 29, which it intersects in Athens, Georgia. US 129 currently runs for 582 miles (937 km) from an intersection with US 19/US 27 ALT/US 98 in Chiefland, Florida, to an interchange with Interstate 40 (I-40) in Knoxville, Tennessee. It passes through the states of Florida, Georgia, North Carolina, and Tennessee. It goes through the cities of Macon, Athens, Gainesville, and Knoxville.

The first 11 miles of US 129 in Tennessee, from Deals Gap on the North Carolina–Tennessee state line to the southern terminus of the Foothills Parkway, is known as The Tail of the Dragon from its winding course. It is a popular motorcycle and sports car destination. This segment is claimed by locals to have 318 curves in 11 miles, although the true number of curves is lower.

== Route description ==
=== Florida ===
A US 129 shield used in Florida prior to 1993

US 129 begins at US 19/US 27 Alternate/US 98 in Chiefland, Florida, along hidden SR 47 until it reaches SR 26 in Trenton. From there, the road is signed along hidden SR 49. It then moves west, briefly overlapping US 27 (hidden SR 20) and heads north again in Branford, before that road intersects SR 349, which used to also serve as US 129 Alternate. From here, it intersects with US 90/SR 51 in Live Oak, taking SR 51 as the new hidden state road, then meets I-10 at exit 283, and later I-75 at exit 451. During a concurrency with US 41 in Jasper, US 129 loses SR 51 as a hidden route after the concurrency ends and runs northwest along SR 100 into Georgia.

=== Georgia ===
US 129 provides the primary route between central Georgia and Athens. It approaches Athens from the south where it joins SR 10 Loop, a mostly interstate-grade bypass that rings Athens-Clarke County. Here US 129 turns right, toward the northeast, where it runs concurrently with US 78/US 29/US 441/SR 15 (and unsigned SR 422) along the bypass. US 129 intersects with US 29 northeast of Athens and continues along SR 10 Loop westward before exiting at Jefferson Road where it winds northwesterly towards Gainesville as one of several routes to I-85 from Athens.

=== North Carolina ===
From the Georgia state line, it travels northeast to Topton, where it goes north to Robbinsville followed by Tennessee, through Deals Gap.

=== Tennessee ===
US 129 enters Tennessee to the west of Great Smoky Mountains National Park and rides along Chilhowee Lake for a short distance before turning due north. In this 11-mile-long (18 km) stretch after the Tennessee–North Carolina state line, drivers will encounter 318 curves in a distance of around 11 miles. These curves make this stretch of highway a well-known motorcycle/sports car destination named Tail Of The Dragon. On weekends, through spring to the fall months, visitors are likely to see numerous riders and drivers on this stretch of the highway to experience the thrill and scenery. US 129 then travels due north, becoming known as Alcoa Highway and passing through the city of Maryville. It travels through Alcoa, passing by McGhee Tyson Airport, and then intersecting I-140. US 129 then crosses the Tennessee River on the James E. "Buck" Karnes Bridge into Knoxville. Shortly thereafter, US 129 becomes a limited-access highway for a short distance. It has an interchange with US 11/US 70 immediately after entering Knoxville. Shortly thereafter, US 129 meets its northern terminus, an interchange with I-40.

== Major intersections ==
Florida
US 19 / US 98 in Chiefland
US 27 east-southeast of Branford. The highways travel concurrently to Branford.
US 90 in Live Oak
I-10 north-northeast of Live Oak
I-75 north-northeast of Suwannee Springs
US 41 southeast of Jasper. The highways travel concurrently to Jasper.
Georgia
US 84 in Stockton
US 221 east-northeast of Lakeland. The highways travel concurrently to Lakeland.
US 82 in Alapaha. The highways travel concurrently to northeast of Alapaha.
US 319 in Ocilla. The highways travel concurrently to Fitzgerald.
US 280 in Abbeville
US 341 in Hawkinsville. The highways travel concurrently to northwest of Hawkinsville.
US 41 north of Sofkee. The highways travel concurrently to Macon.
US 80 in Macon. The highways travel concurrently through Macon.
US 23 in Macon. The highways travel concurrently through Macon.
I-16 in Macon
US 441 in Eatonton. The highways travel concurrently to Athens.
I-20 in Madison
US 278 in Madison. The highways travel concurrently to northeast of Madison.
US 29 / US 78 in Athens. The highways travel concurrently through Athens.
I-85 in Jefferson
I-985 / US 23 in Gainesville. The highways share an unsigned concurrency to northeast of Gainesville.
US 19 in Turners Corner. The highways travel concurrently to Topton, North Carolina.
US 76 in Blairsville.
North Carolina
US 64 / US 74 in Ranger. US 64/US 129 travels concurrently to Murphy. US 74/US 129 travels concurrently to Topton.
Tennessee
US 411 south-southeast of Clover Hill. The highways travel concurrently to Maryville.
US 321 in Maryville
I-140 in Alcoa
US 11 / US 70 in Knoxville
I-40 in Knoxville

== In popular culture ==
U.S. 129 is mentioned in the popular country song Bottoms Up by Brantley Gilbert: "I see you and me riding like Bonnie and Clyde, Goin 95 burning down 129."

U.S. 129 is known particularly for being a route containing hundreds of mountainous curves and turns (in the Tennessee section). With the rise of the internet and telecommunications, the Tennessee section of the route has become popularized by its motoring enthusiasts who share their experiences through social messaging boards and media outlets. This small stretch of around 11 miles starting at Deals Gap just before the Tennessee state line in North Carolina, has been nicknamed Tail Of The Dragon.

== See also ==
- Special routes of U.S. Route 129
