= O'Brien, Florida =

- Unincorporated community
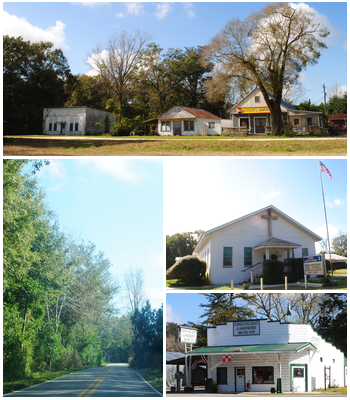
- Top, left to right: Buildings near the main intersection of O'Brien, 226th Street, O'Brien Baptist Church, O'Brien Feed Depot & Hardware

- Location within Florida
- Coordinates: 30°02′18″N 82°56′24″W
- Country: United States
- State: Florida
- County: Suwannee
- Elevation: 52 ft (16 m)
- Time zone: UTC-5 (Eastern (EST))
  - Summer (DST): UTC-4 (EDT)
- ZIP code: 32071
- Area code: 386
- GNIS feature ID: 287920

O'Brien is an unincorporated community in Suwannee County, Florida, United States, located along U.S. Route 129 at the intersection of County Road 349, north of Branford. O'Brien has a post office with ZIP code 32071.

O’Brien was established in 1880, and was originally known as OBrien Station as it was on the railroad route between Live Oak and Branford.
