= Florida State Road 49 =

Highway in Florida, US

State Road 49

Route information
- Maintained by FDOT
- Length: 34.075 mi (54.838 km)
- Existed: 1945–present

Major junctions
- South end: US 19 / US 27 Alt. / US 98 in Chiefland
- SR 26 / SR 47 in Trenton
- North end: US 27 near Branford

Location
- Country: United States
- State: Florida
- Counties: Levy, Gilchrist, Suwannee

Highway system
- Florida State Highway System; Interstate; US; State; Former; Pre‑1945; Toll; Scenic
← SR 48	→ SR 50

State Road 49 (SR 49) is the state designation for U.S. Route 129 between SR 47 in Trenton, and US 27(SR 20) in Hildreth east of Branford, Florida. It also includes a county extension in Suwannee County, Florida from Hildreth to the outskirts of Live Oak, Florida.

== Route description ==
State Road 49 begins just northwest of the southeastern terminus of the US 19-98-27 ALT concurrency in Chiefland. The road is concurrent with US 129, running northeast until it reaches Northwest 30th Avenue and turns straight north where it remains through the rest of Levy County. A few blocks after crossing the Levy-Gilchrist County line, SR 49 enters the City of Trenton, where it curves briefly to the northeast at Southwest 10th Avenue, only to return directly north at the northern terminus of County Road 339 where the road becomes South Main Street, which contains such historic sites as the Trenton Church of Christ and the Gilchrist County Courthouse. The four corners of Trenton can be found at SR 26, which becomes West Wade Street on the west side and East Wade Street on the east side, while SR 49 changes from South Main Street to North Main Street. Further north in the vicinity of Fourth Avenue and Lancaster Avenue the former Atlantic Coast Line Depot serves as the trailhead of the Trenton-Newberry Rail Trail.

At a fork in the road, State Road 47 branches off to the northeast, while US 129/SR 49 turns to the northwest. North of the Trenton City Limits, SR 49 passes by the Trenton Fire Tower near Joppa Lake. After the intersection with CR 344, the road turns straight north again at CR 307, just south of the Sam Whet Farms Airport.

In the Town of Bell the only major intersection is CR 342, which runs west to CR 341, although the northern border of the town is at the intersection of Northwest 20th Street, which is CR 236, and also leads to CR 341. North of the town limits, the road intersects CR 340, which is a tri-county road spanning from SR 349 in northeastern Dixie County to Monteocha in Alachua County. The last routed intersection with US 129 in Gilchrist County is CR 138, but the last intersection in general is Northwest 117th Place, which is just south of the bridge over the Santa Fe River where it enters Suwannee County. From the Santa Fe River Bridge, the first intersection is 296th Street, and all subsequent intersections are equally minor until it reaches Hildreth, where it crosses the Suwannee River Greenway Trail then encounters the east end of a multiplex with U.S. Route 27 (hidden SR 20). US 27-129 becomes a multiplex until they reach the Town of Branford, while State Road 49 continues north as County Road 49.

For the most part CR 49 remains straight as it passes by farmland, ranches, and wooded areas, interrupted by the occasional abandoned railroad right-of-way and power line right-of-way. The closest thing resembling a major intersection here is a blinker light and turning ramps at State Road 247, and almost immediately an intersection with CR 248, which leads to a trailhead on the east bank of the Suwannee River. The straight south-to-north trajectory ends when it curves to the northwest as 57th Road runs straight from there, then turns straight again at 224th Street & Novelle Road. The next intersection is a paved road that connects to CR 240 in Columbia County, but has no number in Suwannee County. Two large blocks north of that intersection CR 49 intersects an un-notable dead end dirt road named 210th Place just at a large power line right-of-way. Further north, another power line right-of-way can be found just south of the intersection of 180th Street/South McAlpin Road, but a power substation can be found on the west side between that ROW, and the southwest corner of that intersection. The road makes another brief northwest reverse curve and then turns straight north and south again between 178th and 172nd Streets.

Near McAlpin CR 49 crosses a bridge over a small creek, then makes another curve to the northwest and later intersects another moderate county road, specifically the bi-county CR 252 near the Rocky Hill Fire Tower. The rest of the journey is relatively insignificant until it passes the historic Hull-Hawkins House, a home listed on the National Register of Historic Places. Roughly a mile or so north of there, it takes a short curve to the west and then returns to the same northwest angle. Only between Hilldale Road(a dirt road leading to "Wings 'N' Sunsets" Airport) and 112th Street does it start to turn straight north again, where it stays for the rest of its journey, eventually terminating at U.S. Route 90 (hidden SR 10) east of the City of Live Oak. Diagonally across from the terminus is a de facto continuation onto a local street known as 101st Road.

== Major intersections ==
County	Location	mi	km	Destinations	Notes
Levy	Chiefland	0.000	0.000	US 19 (SR 55) / US 27 Alt. / US 98 – Inglis, Cedar Key, St. Petersburg, Fanning Springs	
see US 129 (mile 0.000-34.075)
Suwannee		34.075	54.838	US 27 / US 129 north (SR 20) – Branford, Fort White	north end of US 129 overlap; north end of state maintenance
Suwannee	Beachville	37.2	59.9	SR 247 – Branford, Lake City	
Suwannee		37.4	60.2	CR 248	
Suwannee		49.1	79.0	CR 252	
Suwannee		58.701	94.470	US 90 (SR 10)	
1.000 mi = 1.609 km; 1.000 km = 0.621 mi: Concurrency terminus
