= List of former state roads in Florida (1–99) =

The current county roads that are extensions or former alignments of state roads with the same number are not listed here.

- State Road 1: renumbered SR A1A
- State Road 3: second segment became realigned SR A1A around St. Augustine Beach, with CR A1A replacing the old SR A1A
- State Road 13: see below for second segment
- State Road 15: alternate route west of Sanford became CR 15
- State Road 23: renumbered as part of SR 121 from Gainesville north (a short segment on Southwest 63rd Avenue remained and is now unsigned CR 23)
- State Road 27: renumbered SR 997 and SR 9336
- State Road 32: see below
- State Road 42: see below
- State Road 67: see below
- State Road 74: see below
- State Road 82: second segment renumbered SR 736
- State Road 92: see below
- State Road 94: second segment on Loop Road in Everglades National Park

== State Road 10A ==
In addition to the existing three segments of Florida State Road 10A, several former segments are now county roads.

=== Walton-Holmes Counties ===
County Road 10A
- Location: Argyle-western Holmes County

County Road 10A is a former segment of State Road 10A. The road begins southeast from US 90 in Argyle in concurrency with CR 183 from US 90 which curves to the northeast. This segment of CR 10A is named Old Highway 90, and at first, runs along the north side of the CSX P&A Subdivision. This alignment is short-lived though as it approaches a fork in the road where CR 183 heads to the southeast and has its own fork in the road with Railroad Avenue before crossing the tracks, while CR 10A curves to the northeast. The first intersection it encounters along this trajectory is Fire Department Avenue, which as appropriately named leads to the Argyle Volunteer Fire Department. A second intersection with another local street was eliminated when the fire house on the previous street was expanded. CR 10A does not terminate at US 90, although the intersection with the road is split into a pair of 90-degree intersections, the second of which removes the name "Old Spanish Trail" from US 90 as it continues northeast before both the old and "new" versions of US 90 cross the Walton-Holmes County Line.

The road maintains the name "Old Spanish Trail" as it enters Holmes County from the Walton-Holmes County Line, briefly turning north and south on the east side of that border only to curve briefly to the east after one power line right-of-way where it then crosses a second power line right-of-way before turning northeast, and winding through the woods of southwestern Holmes County. Just after a bridge over Bridge Creek, the road curves towards the east before the intersection of County Road 183A, where it encounters a private home that was a former gas station. From there, the road turns southeast, then it crosses over Bridge Creek again, and later over another bridge over Hog Creek, just northwest of the intersection with County Road 81A, which is not a suffixed route of SR 81. Continuing southeast, the road runs through more woods interrupted by two parcels of farmland on the south side, obstructed by a line of trees with a grass road between the two farms, then crosses the first power line right-of-way it went under when it entered Holmes County. After both intersections with the two legs of Holly Road, the road briefly turns straight east and then curves back to the southeast. Avoiding a fork in the road, CR 10A makes a sharp right turn to end at US 90 and the Baker Manning Loop.

The second segment begins in eastern Ponce De Leon at US 90 east of Main Street. The first name of this segment is Old US 90, and runs northeast of US 90 from there until it reaches Oak Grove Church Road, then turns southwest until it terminates at US 90 in rural western Holmes County. FDOT maps, however suggest that the route extends past Oak Grove Church Road, and runs along the P&A Subdivision until that railroad line runs parallel to the north side of US 90 more than halfway between Oak Grove Church Road and Valee Road. It's possible that this is an abandoned segment of the road.

=== Jackson County ===
County Road 10A
- Location: Marianna and Sneads

County Road 10A also exists in two different segments in Jackson County, one in the Marianna area and the other in Sneads. The first one is Old Cottondale Road which begins at US 90 west of Marianna, beginning southeast from US 90, and then curving straight east and west just before the intersection with Heritage Road, only to curve southeast again at a power sub-station just before the intersection with Moneyham Road. CR 10A doesn't truly enter the city limits until it approaches the headquarters of Jackson County Transportation on the northwest corner of Sunrise Drive. After this intersection, the road passes by the Apostolic Life United United Pentecostal Church turns straight east and west again. A few blocks after this it encounters its one major intersection other than its termini, State Road 276(Pennsylvania Avenue) at a blinker light intersection. East of there, the road takes a dip into the woods and has one intersection with Edenfield Street before a fork in the road for a former segment named Milton Avenue, and then a connecting spur named Hanson Street. Four blocks after this, it encounters a three-way stop intersection with Orange Street and then one intersection with a residential street before it crosses the P&A Subdivision next to a dry river bed and ends at US 90.

The second segment begins on US 90 at the western edge of Sneads as Keevers Road. It runs southeast and has intersections with two dirt roads, one of which has an actual name (Gay Avenue) before moving onto the Old Spanish Trail, which was a separate local street since the intersection with State Road 71 east of Marianna. Five blocks after this it intersects a street named River Road, which leads to CR 271 and almost several blocks later intersects CR 286(Gloster Avenue). After CR 286, the road runs along the north side of the P&A Subdivision, across from Sneads High School. The road moves away from the tracks after the intersection with Third Avenue. At Legion Road, the road becomes a one-way street that ends just west of a dirt road named Pete's Way. Both segments serve as the east end of County Road 10A. The former right-of-way for the Old Spanish Trail runs along the south side of US 90 as it crosses Pete's Way and then Barannie Lane just before it ends.

=== Suwannee County ===
County Road 10A
- Location: Live Oak and Wellborn

County Road 10A exists in two segments in Suwannee County as well. The first is in Live Oak and the second is in Wellborn. The Live Oak segment begins as Helvenston Street Southeast at US 129 rather than at US 90. Within the city, most of the area surrounding the route is purely residential, except on the northwest and northeast corners of White Avenue, and other random locations. Drivers know that they're about to leave the city when they see a storage facility on the southwest corner of Railroad Avenue, and the route veers slightly to the left. The railroad for which the cross street was named can be found east of the street at an abandoned Atlantic Coast Line Railroad crossing that's closer to a dirt road named 109th Street. A dirt road and former segment of the road named 103rd Drive veers off to the right at an at-grade interchange where this segment of County Road 10A ends at US 90 just west of the intersection of County Road 49. 103rd Drive runs south of CR 10A and then south of US 90 for one block.

The Wellborn segment begins on the north side of US 90. Much of the road is a block south of the CSX Tallahassee Subdivision (Eighth Avenue is directly on the south side of those tracks). Aside from Low Lake Road at the Wellborn Baptist Church property, most intersections along the road are paper roads and dirt roads leading to Eighth Avenue until it reaches County Road 137, a south-to-north county road spanning from US 27 in Hildreth through I-10 at Exit 292 to SR 136 in Poucher's Corner. The road continues for five more blocks along the same trajectory, and after Third Avenue, the road begins to curve southeast, primarily east of Wellborn Lake. By the time it reaches the intersection of 31st Road, CR 10A gains the name Odigo Road, momentarily running south then curves more easterly again at 29th Road before finally ends at US 90 just west of the Suwannee-Columbia County Line.

== State Road 13 ==
Before 1945, State Road 13 was posted from Cedar Key to Fernandina Beach via State Road 24 (Cedar Key to Waldo), U. S. Route 301 (Waldo to Callahan) and State Road 200 (Callahan to Fernandina Beach).

In the early 1950s, the State Road Department acquired part of the Kissimmee Valley Line of the Florida East Coast Railway in Orange and Seminole Counties for highway purposes. The proposed state road was numbered as an extension of the existing State Road 13.

Most of the road was never built, but a piece through Bithlo was given to Orange County and is now County Road 13. The designation does not appear on county road shields, but is the only street name for the road.

== State Road 14 ==
Before 1945, Florida State Road 14 was posted between U. S. Route 19 in Wilcox and U. S. Route 1 in St. Augustine via State Road 26 (Wilcox to Gainesville), State Road 20 (Gainesville to East Palatka) and State Road 207 (East Palatka to St. Augustine).

== State Road 32 ==
County Road 32
- Location: Bronson, Florida

State Road 32 was a short northerly bypass of Bronson, linking US 27 Alt. to SR 24 at the north city limits. State Road 32B ran south to SR 24 in Bronson along Marshburn Drive. Both routes are now county roads with the same numbers.

== State Road 42 ==
County Road 42
- Location: Pedro-Crow's Bluff

State Road 42, now County Road 42, connected Pedro to Crows Bluff via Weirsdale and Altoona. The road is considered by some to be a popular motorcycling tourist drive.

County	Location	mi	km	Destinations	Notes
Marion	Pedro	0.000	0.000	CR 475 to I-75	
Marion		2.0	3.2	CR 467 north (Southeast 36th Avenue)	
Marion	Dallas	4.8	7.7	US 301 (SR 35)	
Marion		8.0	12.9	US 27 / US 441 (SR 500) – The Villages	
Marion	Weirsdale	11.8	19.0	CR 25 (Ocala Road)	
Marion	Starkes Ferry	17.4	28.0	Bridge over Ocklawaha River	
Marion		20.8	33.5	CR 452 south	
Marion		22.186	35.705	CR 450 south (West Ocala Avenue) – Florida Elks Youth Camp	
Lake	Altoona	30.0	48.3	SR 19	
Lake		31.4	50.5	CR 450 west (East Collins Street)	
Lake		33.5	53.9	CR 439 south	
Lake	Crows Bluff	48.693	78.364	SR 44	
1.000 mi = 1.609 km; 1.000 km = 0.621 mi

== State Road 67 ==
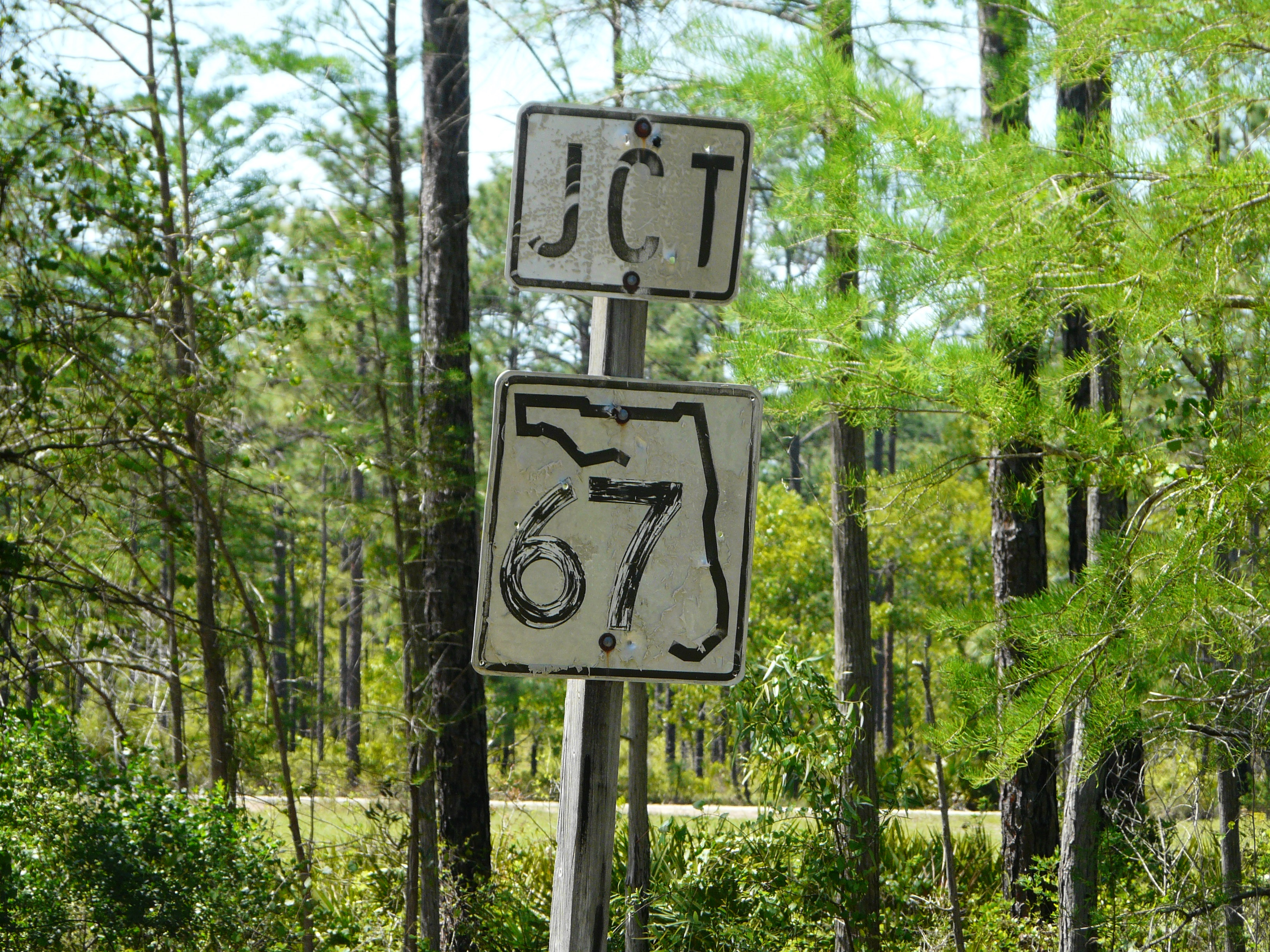
Junction FL-67 sign remaining on FH-13.

State Road 67, now County Road 67, crossed the Apalachicola National Forest on its way from US 98 in Carrabelle to Telogia and SR 12 (now CR 12) south of Bristol.

Two segments of State Road 67A are now County Road 67A. One is located on Ryan Drive and Three Rivers Road in Carrabelle, connecting US 98 and CR 67 west of downtown. No signs are posted. The other is in Liberty County and bypasses Telogia to the northeast, shortening the distance between CR 67 and SR 65 south of Hosford. Several other pieces in and near Bristol no longer carry the 67A designation.

== State Road 74 ==
State Road 74 existed in several sections. The most important one connected US 17 northeast of Punta Gorda with SR 29 south of Palmdale. Another stretched west from SR 78 in Lakeport, and was planned to continue to US 27 north of Palmdale. These two segments are now County Road 74.

A third piece of State Road 74 in Palm Beach County was renumbered State Road 786.

== State Road 92 ==
State Road 92, now County Road 92, spurred southwest from US 41 (Tamiami Trail) at Royal Palm Hammock to Marco Island. A short branch to Goodland was originally numbered State Road 92A, but became SR 892 in the mid-1970s and now has become County Road 892.
