= Florida State Road 51 =

Highway in Florida, US

State Road 51
- Florida State Road 51, signed (red) and unsigned (blue)

Route information
- Maintained by FDOT
- Length: 70.447 mi (113.373 km)
- Existed: 1945–present

Major junctions
- South end: CR 361 in Steinhatchee
- US 27 in Mayo; US 90 / US 129 in Live Oak
- North end: US 41 / US 129 / SR 6 in Jasper

Location
- Country: United States
- State: Florida
- Counties: Taylor, Dixie, Lafayette, Suwannee, Hamilton

Highway system
- Florida State Highway System; Interstate; US; State; Former; Pre‑1945; Toll; Scenic
← SR 50A	→ SR 52

State Road 51 (SR 51) is a north–south state highway in north Florida. Its northern terminus is along the overlap of US 41 and US 129. It runs southwards as the "secret" designation of US 129 to Live Oak, where it splits off and runs independently south to Steinhatchee. The Hal W. Adams Bridge carries it across the Suwannee River three miles (5 km) north of Mayo.

County Road 51 runs north from US 41/129 and SR 6 in Jasper to the Georgia border.

== Route description ==
=== Gulf of Mexico through Lafayette County ===
State Road 51 begins in Steinhatchee and throughout Taylor County, it follows the west bank of the Steinhatchee River. Within the community it runs along First Avenue South, Riverside Drive, both of which runs east and west. It then bears left onto Fourth Avenue South, which curves into 15th Street East, where it runs in its intended south-to-north direction for the first time. North of Steinhatchee SR 51 is named St. Linhatchee Drive and winds through the wetlands of southeastern Taylor County. After curving sharply to the northeast, the first truly major intersection is in Tennille, with the triple-overlap of US 19/98/ALT 27, a combination that spans from Chiefland to Perry. SR 51 curves back to the left, but still runs northeast.

The road briefly enters the northwest corner of Dixie County near the Steinhatchee Springs Wildlife Management Area, only to cross over into Lafayette County. Still within the Steinhatchee Springs WMA, the road continues through southwestern Lafayette County, but suddenly starts to curve more to the east as it approaches the northern terminus of County Road 357 in Cooks Hammock. Continuing to curve to the east and move away from the southwestern portion of the county it crosses over the Steinhatchee River, but then starts to curve more northerly again, and even to the northwest before it approaches the western terminus of CR 360. The road curves back to the northeast and finally straightens out as it enters the Town of Mayo and becomes Fletcher Avenue. One other county road terminates at SR 51 in the town, specifically CR 355 which continues west as Pine Street. The much more important intersection is at the center of town which happens to be U.S. Route 27 (West Main Street and East Man Street). From there it runs between Lafayette County Courthouse (Florida) which occupies the entire block between US 27 and Bloxham Street, and across the street the Old Mayo Free Press Building next door to the Old Lafayette County Courthouse which can be found on the southeast corner of SR 51 and Bloxham Street. The last county road in town is CR 400. Further north it intersects CR 534, and a block later it runs into the last routed intersection in Lafayette County which is CR 354 (South Convict Spring Road), but the last intersection in the county at large is with a cul-de-sac named Northeast Castagna Lane. North of there the road crosses the historic Hal W. Adams Bridge over the Suwannee River.

=== Suwannee County to Georgia State Line ===
As it crosses the Suwannee County Line, the road is given the name Irvin Avenue Northwest, a name it keeps throughout much of the county. Within Luraville it remains relatively straight at first as it passes through the Peacock Springs State Recreational Area, but starts to curve northeast, where it intersects the western terminus of CR 252, the northern terminus of CR 349, and the eastern terminus of CR 250. As it enters the historic City of Live Oak the road is named Irvin Avenue Southwest and continues to run at the same northeast to southwest angle. This trajectory end at 11th Street where CR 136 officially joins SR 51 in an overlap, however both are overshadowed by US 129 (South Ohio Avenue). It is at this point both routes turn left onto Ohio Avenue. Roughly two blocks later, the road encounters CR 10A (Helvenston Street Southeast). Further downtown it becomes the location for the Old Live Oak Post Office, and later, the Suwannee County Courthouse, and then the four corners of the city at U.S. Route 90 (hidden SR 10), where US 129/SR 51's name changes from South Ohio Avenue to North Ohio Avenue, and US 90's name changes from West Howard Street to East Howard Street.

One block later it crosses the railroad tracks where the historic Union Depot and Atlantic Coast Line Freight Station can be found, and the Old Live Oak City Hall can be found on the next block. It is here where the multiplex with State Road 136 ends at West Duval Street Northeast. After leaving the city limits, the road eventually becomes a four-lane divided highway as it approaches Interstate 10 at Exit 283, only to revert to a two-lane undivided road after it passes under the interchange. The only other intersection from here is CR 136A. The road enters Suwannee Springs, Florida, where it meets the intersection with CR 132, and secretly takes it north, as it prepares to make a second crossing over the Suwannee River. At this point it winds around another former bridge that carried SR 51, and eventually US 129 onto a much newer bridge, curving left and then right over the river as it enters Hamilton County.

Unlike in Suwannee County, only a hint of the right-of-way of the former segment of US 129 can be found before the road turns straight north before letting go of its multiplex with CR 132, which runs east. Further north it enters the unincorporated community of Marion, where it intersects one other county road before meeting another interchange, this time Interstate 75 at Exit 451 Beyond that, it passes through Hillcoat, where US 129/SR 51 joins US 41 as well as hidden SRs 25 and 100. The newly overlapped routes briefly run straight north before making a reverse curve around the left side of Roberts Pond and Shaky Pond before entering the City of Jasper. US 41/129/SR 100 turns west onto State Road 6 (Hatley Street), which becomes County Road 6 east of the intersection, while County Road 51 (First Avenue Northeast) begins one block to the west.

CR 51 runs briefly along First Avenue Northeast to Second Street Northeast, where it turns right, only to curve northeast again. Shortly after the curve, it has an at-grade crossing with a Georgia Southern and Florida Railway line that was following US 41 since Lake City. At Northeast 39th Drive, the road curves more northerly, although not necessarily straight north. The road winds through local Northern Florida forest land with occasional wetlands even as it passes through the barely existing community of Bakers Mill. After crossing a narrow bridge over the Little Alapaha River it intersects a dirt road named Northwest 13th Street which leads to US 129 near Avoca. The rest of the journey of CR 51 is surrounded by scrub forest. County Road 51 runs north to the Georgia border at a T intersection with two dirt roads named Flaline Break Road and Barnes Road, the latter of which is entirely dirt as far north as its terminus with State Route 94 at Tarver, Georgia.

== Major intersections ==
County	Location	mi	km	Destinations	Notes
Taylor	Steinhatchee	0.000	0.000	To 1st Avenue South to Bridge / CR 358 CR 361 north – Keaton Beach	
Taylor	Steinhatchee	1.621	2.609	To 1st Avenue South to Bridge / CR 358	
Taylor	Tennille	9.863	15.873	US 19 / US 27 Alt. / US 98 (SR 55) – Perry, Cross City, St. Petersburg	
Dixie	No major junctions				
Lafayette	Cooks Hammock	20.893	33.624	CR 357 south	
Lafayette		28.798	46.346	CR 360 east	former SR 355A east
Lafayette	Mayo	31.938	51.399	Southeast Pine Street	former SR 355 south
Lafayette	Mayo	32.182	51.792	US 27 (Main Street / SR 20) – Perry, Branford	
Lafayette	Mayo	32.451	52.225	CR 400 east	
Lafayette		34.438	55.423	CR 536 west	former SR 53 north
Lafayette		34.916	56.192	CR 354 east – Convict Springs	
Suwannee River		35.43	57.02	Hal W. Adams Bridge	
Suwannee		40.819	65.692	CR 252 east / 152nd Street – Charles Springs	
Suwannee		47.268	76.070	CR 349 south	
Suwannee		48.684	78.349	CR 250 west – Dowling Park	
Suwannee	Live Oak	52.97	85.25	CR 136 west / Walker Avenue north (truck route) – Dowling Park	roundabout
Suwannee	Live Oak	53.469	86.050	US 129 south (Ohio Avenue / Dr. M.L. King Jr. Avenue / SR 249) – Branford	south end of US 129 overlap
see US 129 (mile 62.327-79.305)
Hamilton	Jasper	70.447	113.373	US 41 north / US 129 north / SR 6 west / CR 6 east (Hatley Street / SR 25 north / SR 100 north) – Jennings, Statenville	north end of US 41 / US 129 / SR 25 / SR 100 overlap
1.000 mi = 1.609 km; 1.000 km = 0.621 mi: Concurrency terminus
