= Beachville, Florida =

- Unincorporated community
- Location within Florida
- Coordinates: 29°59′53″N 82°51′40″W
- Country: United States
- State: Florida
- County: Suwannee
- Elevation: 56 ft (17 m)
- Time zone: UTC-5 (Eastern (EST))
  - Summer (DST): UTC-4 (EDT)
- ZIP code: 32071
- Area code: 386
- GNIS feature ID: 278265

Beachville is an unincorporated community in Suwannee County, Florida, United States. Beachville is located on State Road 247 at the junction of County Road 49, 5 miles (8.0 km) north-east of Branford. Beachville is the location of the Beachville Fire Tower
