= Branford High School =

Branford High School can refer to:

- Branford High School (Connecticut)
- Branford High School (Florida)
