= Suwannee County, Florida =

County in Florida, United States

- County
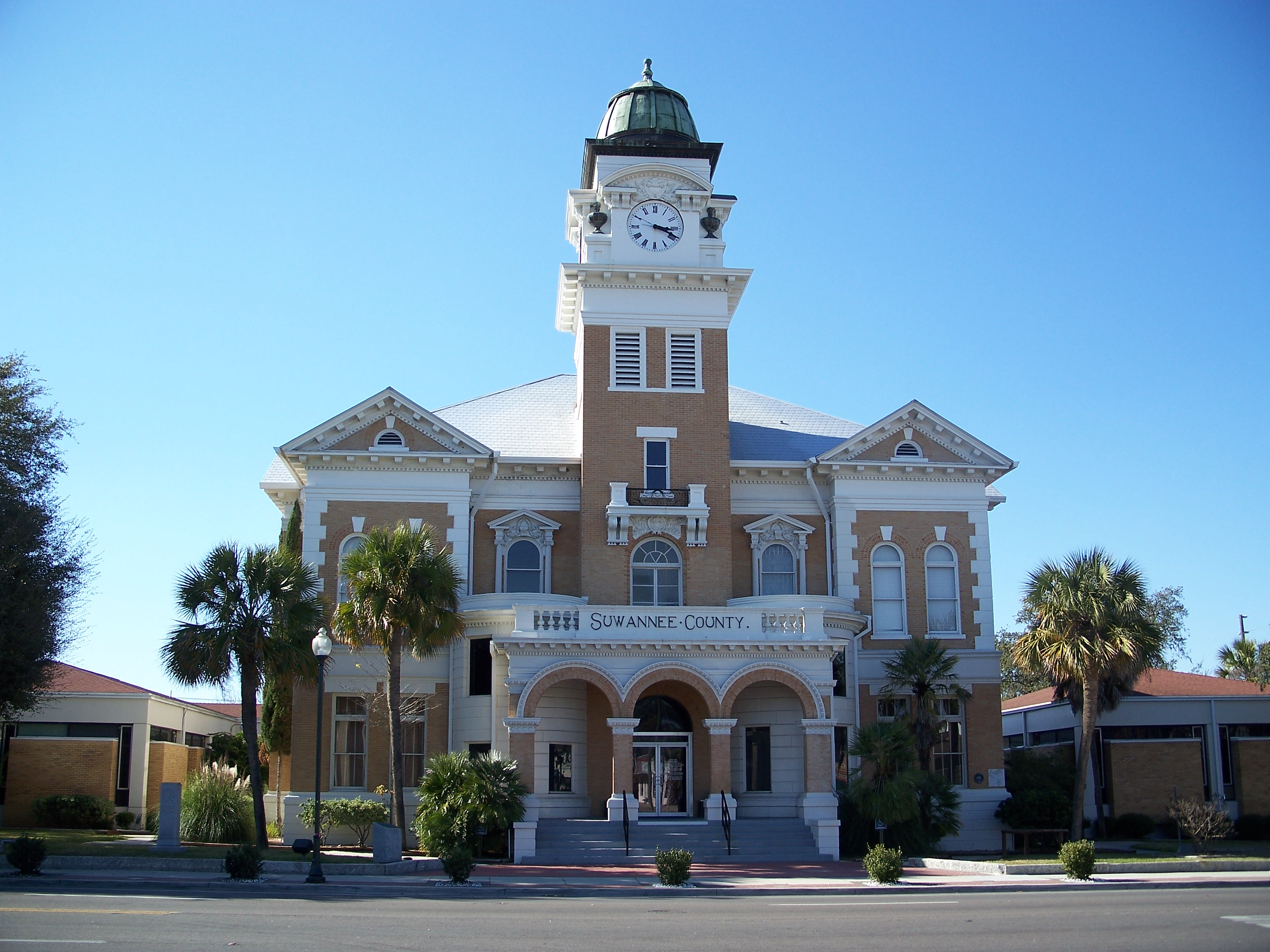
- The Suwannee County Courthouse in Live Oak

- Seal

- Location within the U.S. state of Florida
- Coordinates: 30°11′N 82°59′W
- Country: United States
- State: Florida
- Founded: December 21, 1858
- Named for: Suwannee River
- Seat: Live Oak
- Largest city: Live Oak

Area
  - Total: 692 sq mi (1,790 km^{2})
  - Land: 689 sq mi (1,780 km^{2})
  - Water: 3.7 sq mi (9.6 km^{2}) 0.5%

Population (2020)
  - Total: 43,474
  - Estimate (2025): 48,149 ▲
  - Density: 63.1/sq mi (24.4/km^{2})
- Time zone: UTC−5 (Eastern)
  - Summer (DST): UTC−4 (EDT)
- Congressional district: 3rd
- Website: suwanneecountyfl.gov

Suwannee County is a county located in the north central portion of the state of Florida. As of the 2020 census, the population was 43,474, up from 41,551 in 2010. Its county seat is Live Oak. Suwannee County was a dry county until August 2011, when the sale of alcoholic beverages became legal in the county.

== History ==
Suwannee County was created in 1858, as railways were constructed through the area connecting it to Jacksonville, Tallahassee, and points north. It was named after the Suwannee River, which forms the county's northern, western, and much of its southern border. The word "Suwannee" may either be a corruption of the Spanish San Juan ("Saint John") or from the Creek (Muscogee) sawani ("echo river").

During the American Civil War, Company K of the 3rd Florida Infantry Regiment was composed almost entirely of men from Suwannee County. In 1884, Florida's volunteer militia was reorganized and the Suwanee Rifles were established. The Rifles were among the twelve companies from Florida that were activated for service during the Spanish–American War.

The rural areas supported numerous lumber and turpentine camps. In the 1930s, anthropologist Zora Neale Hurston did research in North Florida timber camps.

== Geography ==
According to the U.S. Census Bureau, the county has a total area of 692 square miles (1,790 km^{2}), of which 689 square miles (1,780 km^{2}) is land and 3.7 square miles (9.6 km^{2}) (0.5%) is water.

In 2025, Duke Energy Florida placed a 5 MW/40 MWh sodium–sulfur (NaS) battery storage system into service at its Suwannee site in the county. The system is designed to provide up to eight hours of energy storage and is being used to test long-duration battery storage technology.

=== Adjacent counties ===
- Hamilton County - north
- Columbia County - east
- Gilchrist County - southeast
- Lafayette County - west
- Madison County - northwest

== Demographics ==
Historical population
| Census | Pop. | Note | %± |
|---|---|---|---|
| 1860 | 2,303 | | — |
| 1870 | 3,556 | | 54.4% |
| 1880 | 7,161 | | 101.4% |
| 1890 | 10,524 | | 47.0% |
| 1900 | 14,554 | | 38.3% |
| 1910 | 18,603 | | 27.8% |
| 1920 | 19,789 | | 6.4% |
| 1930 | 15,731 | | −20.5% |
| 1940 | 17,073 | | 8.5% |
| 1950 | 16,986 | | −0.5% |
| 1960 | 14,961 | | −11.9% |
| 1970 | 15,559 | | 4.0% |
| 1980 | 22,287 | | 43.2% |
| 1990 | 26,780 | | 20.2% |
| 2000 | 34,844 | | 30.1% |
| 2010 | 41,551 | | 19.2% |
| 2020 | 43,474 | | 4.6% |
| 2025 (est.) | 48,149 | ▲ | 10.8% |
U.S. Decennial Census; 1790-1960 1900-1990; 1990-2000 2010-2019 2020

=== Racial and ethnic composition ===
Suwannee County, Florida – Racial and ethnic composition Note: the US Census treats Hispanic/Latino as an ethnic category. This table excludes Latinos from the racial categories and assigns them to a separate category. Hispanics/Latinos may be of any race.
| Race / Ethnicity (NH = Non-Hispanic) | Pop 1980 | Pop 1990 | Pop 2000 | Pop 2010 | Pop 2020 | % 1980 | % 1990 | % 2000 | % 2010 | % 2020 |
|---|---|---|---|---|---|---|---|---|---|---|
| White alone (NH) | 18,096 | 22,277 | 28,262 | 32,300 | 31,664 | 81.20% | 83.19% | 81.11% | 77.74% | 72.83% |
| Black or African American alone (NH) | 3,847 | 3,915 | 4,177 | 4,696 | 4,920 | 17.26% | 14.62% | 11.99% | 11.30% | 11.32% |
| Native American or Alaska Native alone (NH) | 31 | 101 | 123 | 162 | 167 | 0.14% | 0.38% | 0.35% | 0.39% | 0.38% |
| Asian alone (NH) | 35 | 65 | 165 | 223 | 270 | 0.16% | 0.24% | 0.47% | 0.54% | 0.62% |
| Native Hawaiian or Pacific Islander alone (NH) | x | x | 7 | 11 | 16 | x | x | 0.02% | 0.03% | 0.04% |
| Other race alone (NH) | 9 | 5 | 12 | 37 | 143 | 0.04% | 0.02% | 0.03% | 0.09% | 0.33% |
| Mixed race or Multiracial (NH) | x | x | 395 | 526 | 1,509 | x | x | 1.13% | 1.27% | 3.47% |
| Hispanic or Latino (any race) | 269 | 417 | 1,703 | 3,596 | 4,785 | 1.21% | 1.56% | 4.89% | 8.65% | 11.01% |
| Total | 22,287 | 26,780 | 34,844 | 41,551 | 43,474 | 100.00% | 100.00% | 100.00% | 100.00% | 100.00% |

=== 2020 census ===
As of the 2020 census, there were 43,474 people, 16,385 households, and 10,655 families residing in the county. The median age was 44.7 years; 21.2% of residents were under the age of 18 and 22.8% were 65 years of age or older. For every 100 females there were 105.0 males, and for every 100 females age 18 and over there were 105.6 males age 18 and over.

The racial makeup of the county was 76.0% White, 11.5% Black or African American, 0.5% American Indian and Alaska Native, 0.6% Asian, <0.1% Native Hawaiian and Pacific Islander, 4.4% from some other race, and 7.0% from two or more races. Hispanic or Latino residents of any race comprised 11.0% of the population.

15.3% of residents lived in urban areas, while 84.7% lived in rural areas.

There were 16,385 households in the county, of which 28.2% had children under the age of 18 living in them. Of all households, 46.6% were married-couple households, 19.1% were households with a male householder and no spouse or partner present, and 27.1% were households with a female householder and no spouse or partner present. About 26.7% of all households were made up of individuals and 14.4% had someone living alone who was 65 years of age or older.

There were 18,859 housing units, of which 13.1% were vacant. Among occupied housing units, 74.9% were owner-occupied and 25.1% were renter-occupied. The homeowner vacancy rate was 1.8% and the rental vacancy rate was 6.6%.

=== 2000 census ===
As of the census of 2000, there were 34,844 people, 13,460 households, and 9,691 families residing in the county. The population density was 51 people per square mile (20 people/km^{2}). There were 15,679 housing units at an average density of 23 per square mile (8.9/km^{2}). The racial makeup of the county was 84.53% White, 12.11% Black or African American, 0.39% Native American, 0.51% Asian, 0.04% Pacific Islander, 1.12% from other races, and 1.29% from two or more races. 4.89% of the population were Hispanic or Latino of any race.

There were 13,460 households, out of which 29.50% had children under the age of 18 living with them, 56.50% were married couples living together, 11.20% had a female householder with no husband present, and 28.00% were non-families. 23.30% of all households were made up of individuals, and 11.00% had someone living alone who was 65 years of age or older. The average household size was 2.54 and the average family size was 2.96.

In the county, the population was spread out, with 24.00% under the age of 18, 8.50% from 18 to 24, 25.10% from 25 to 44, 25.40% from 45 to 64, and 16.90% who were 65 years of age or older. The median age was 40 years. For every 100 females there were 95.40 males. For every 100 females age 18 and over, there were 92.90 males.

The median income for a household in the county was $29,963, and the median income for a family was $34,032. Males had a median income of $26,256 versus $21,136 for females. The per capita income for the county was $14,678. About 14.80% of families and 18.50% of the population were below the poverty line, including 21.90% of those under age 18 and 12.40% of those age 65 or over.

In March 2016, the county's unemployment rate was 4.8%.

== Libraries ==
Suwannee County is served by the Suwannee River Regional Library System, which contains eight branches and also serves Hamilton and Madison counties.

- Branford
- Dowling Park
- Greenville
- Jasper
- Jennings
- Lee
- Live Oak
- Madison
- White Springs

Suwannee River Regional Library was first formed by a contractual agreement between Suwannee and Lafayette counties, making it the first regional library in Florida. In 1957, the local Library Board learned that they might get a grant for a new library if they joined with another county. The Suwannee Board convinced the Mayo Woman's Club in Lafayette County to have their county join with Suwannee County and organize the first library region in Florida. With the formation of the duo-county, Suwannee-Lafayette Library Region, it immediately received $28,224 in funds. A small library was established at Mayo in Lafayette County in October 1957. The library started as a 3,100 book collection but soon grew to some 10,000 titles, some loaned from the State Library. A bookmobile was also added and put on the road.

After being successful with its new library, the Suwannee River Regional Library System was approached by a number of nearby counties interested in the project, and in 1959 Columbia, Gilchrist, Hamilton, Madison and Taylor counties qualified for membership and became a part of the system. Greenville, Jasper, Lake City, Madison, and Perry had small libraries operated by a Woman's Club that were also absorbed into the organization. By 1960, the library system now had 23,500 books in its collection, 3,000 of which were a gift from the Miami Public Library. On August 2 of that year, Dixie County became the last one to be invited to join in. Later, the Cross City library observed its official opening December 1, 1960. In May 1990 Madison County expanded by establishing a small satellite branch library in the Town of Lee. The Suwannee County library in Live Oak is the headquarters of the organization, as it has been since the establishment of the Suwannee River Regional Library System.

== Transportation ==
=== Airports ===
Suwannee County is accessed by air from Suwannee County Airport, located two miles west of Live Oak. It is a publicly operated airport run by the county government that has a paved runway in excess of 4,000 feet, major aircraft maintenance, training, car rental, as well as selling 100LL aviation fuel from the FBO. There are also many private airparks scattered throughout the county.

=== Railroads ===
Suwannee County has one surviving railroad line. The primary one is a Florida Gulf & Atlantic Railroad line formerly owned by CSX, Seaboard System Railroad, Seaboard Coast Line Industries and Seaboard Air Line Railroad that served Amtrak's Sunset Limited until it was truncated to New Orleans in 2005 by Hurricane Katrina. Union Depot and Atlantic Coast Line Freight Station was Suwannee County's premiere railroad station on the corner of US 129 & SR 136 in Live Oak, and served both the Atlantic Coast Line Railroad and Seaboard Air Line Railroad but has not been in use since 1971, with the termination of the Louisville and Nashville and Seaboard Coast Line's Gulf Wind (New Orleans - Jacksonville). The Seaboard Air Line operated two passenger trains a day in each direction until 1966 or 1967. Various abandoned lines also exist within the county, one of which was converted into the Suwannee River Greenway Trail, along the southeastern part of the county.

=== Major roads ===
- I-10 (Interstate 10 / SR 8) is the main interstate highway through Swuannee County, running west and east through the panhandle from Alabama to Jacksonville. Three interchanges exist in the county at US 90 east of Falmouth, (Exit 275), US 129 in Live Oak (Exit 283), and CR 137 north of Wellborn (Exit 292).
- I-75 (Interstate 75 / SR 93) also is an interstate highway, running south and north, but only in a remote area of eastern Suwannee County known as Pouchers Corner, and only has an interchange with SR 136 (Exit 439).
- US 27 (SR 20) runs from southeast to northwest along the southern portion of the county, from the Ichetucknee River Bridge at the Ichetucknee Springs State Park thru the Frank R. Norris Bridge over the Suwannee River in Branford.
- US 90 (SR 10) was the main west-to-east route through Suwannee County until it was supplanted by I-10.
- US 129 (SR 49 / SR 249) is the main south-to-north route within the county. It enters the county at a bridge across the Santa Fe River north of Bell, Florida in Gilcrhrist County, then joins US 27 from Hildreth to Branford, only to continue north through Live Oak eventually crossing the Suwannee River, this time entering Hamilton County.
- SR 51 is a south to north state highway that enters Suwannee County from the Hal W. Adams Bridge then runs northeast towards Live Oak, where it serves as a hidden state road for US 129 north through the Hamilton County Line.
- SR 136 / CR 136; Columbia County Road 136 is a county extension of SR 136. It begins at Columbia CR 250 in Dowling Park and runs along the east side of the Suwannee River, then turns east towards SR 51 in Live Oak. The route overlaps SR 51 even as that route overlaps US 129, then leaves US 129.SR 51 to continue east, becoming a state road before the interchange with I-75 only to cross the Hamilton-Columbia county line.
- SR 247 is a northeast to southwest road that spans from Branford, and terminates at US 90 in western Lake City, just east of US 90's interchange with I-75 in Columbia County.

== Communities ==
=== Towns ===
- Live Oak
- Branford

=== Unincorporated communities ===
- Beachville
- Dickert
- Dowling Park
- Ellaville
- Falmouth
- Fort Union
- Hildreth
- Houston
- Luraville
- McAlpin
- O'Brien
- Padlock
- Pouchers Corner
- Rixford
- Slade
- Suwannee Springs
- Wellborn

== Politics ==
Until 1964, Suwannee County, as part of the Solid South, voted with the Democratic presidential candidate every time. Since then, the only Democratic candidate to carry the county was southerner Jimmy Carter, although he carried it both times in 1976 and 1980 despite losing the state and nationally in the latter.

United States presidential election results for Suwannee County, Florida
| Year | Republican | | Democratic | | Third party(ies) | |
| Year | No. | % | No. | % | No. | % |
|---|---|---|---|---|---|---|
| 1904 | 125 | 16.23% | 584 | 75.84% | 61 | 7.92% |
| 1908 | 150 | 14.25% | 597 | 56.70% | 306 | 29.06% |
| 1912 | 54 | 5.26% | 714 | 69.59% | 258 | 25.15% |
| 1916 | 56 | 3.94% | 1,209 | 85.14% | 155 | 10.92% |
| 1920 | 382 | 18.65% | 1,486 | 72.56% | 180 | 8.79% |
| 1924 | 111 | 9.50% | 977 | 83.65% | 80 | 6.85% |
| 1928 | 606 | 31.68% | 1,286 | 67.22% | 21 | 1.10% |
| 1932 | 163 | 7.13% | 2,123 | 92.87% | 0 | 0.00% |
| 1936 | 202 | 6.59% | 2,863 | 93.41% | 0 | 0.00% |
| 1940 | 401 | 12.27% | 2,866 | 87.73% | 0 | 0.00% |
| 1944 | 483 | 16.05% | 2,526 | 83.95% | 0 | 0.00% |
| 1948 | 398 | 9.40% | 3,033 | 71.62% | 804 | 18.98% |
| 1952 | 1,611 | 36.30% | 2,827 | 63.70% | 0 | 0.00% |
| 1956 | 1,046 | 24.85% | 3,163 | 75.15% | 0 | 0.00% |
| 1960 | 1,536 | 35.51% | 2,789 | 64.49% | 0 | 0.00% |
| 1964 | 3,002 | 55.64% | 2,393 | 44.36% | 0 | 0.00% |
| 1968 | 845 | 14.13% | 1,182 | 19.76% | 3,955 | 66.12% |
| 1972 | 4,435 | 80.77% | 1,027 | 18.70% | 29 | 0.53% |
| 1976 | 2,405 | 32.49% | 4,718 | 63.74% | 279 | 3.77% |
| 1980 | 3,899 | 46.22% | 4,345 | 51.51% | 192 | 2.28% |
| 1984 | 6,082 | 68.57% | 2,788 | 31.43% | 0 | 0.00% |
| 1988 | 5,863 | 64.27% | 3,129 | 34.30% | 130 | 1.43% |
| 1992 | 4,576 | 40.23% | 3,988 | 35.06% | 2,810 | 24.71% |
| 1996 | 5,742 | 47.28% | 4,479 | 36.88% | 1,923 | 15.83% |
| 2000 | 8,009 | 64.27% | 4,076 | 32.71% | 376 | 3.02% |
| 2004 | 11,153 | 70.58% | 4,522 | 28.62% | 127 | 0.80% |
| 2008 | 12,534 | 70.77% | 4,916 | 27.76% | 261 | 1.47% |
| 2012 | 12,672 | 71.63% | 4,751 | 26.85% | 269 | 1.52% |
| 2016 | 14,287 | 76.05% | 3,964 | 21.10% | 536 | 2.85% |
| 2020 | 16,410 | 77.84% | 4,485 | 21.27% | 188 | 0.89% |
| 2024 | 17,561 | 80.22% | 4,217 | 19.26% | 113 | 0.52% |

== See also ==
- National Register of Historic Places listings in Suwannee County, Florida
- Suwannee County, Florida paleontological sites
