= Florida State Road 6 =

State highway in Florida, United States

State Road 6
- SR 6 in red, CR 6 in blue

Route information
- Maintained by FDOT
- Length: 27.408 mi (44.109 km)
- Existed: 1945 renumbering (definition)–present

Major junctions
- West end: US 90 near Madison
- I-75 near Crossroads; US 41 in unincorporated Hamilton County
- East end: US 41 / US 129 / CR 6 in Jasper

Location
- Country: United States
- State: Florida
- Counties: Madison, Hamilton

Highway system
- Florida State Highway System; Interstate; US; State; Former; Pre‑1945; Toll; Scenic
← SR 5A	→ SR 7

State Road 6 (SR 6) is an east–west route in Madison and Hamilton Counties, running from U.S. Route 90 (US 90) east of Madison to US 129 in Jasper, the last five miles (8 km) concurrent with US 41.

County Road 6 (CR 6), a former section of SR 6, continues east from Jasper to US 441 in Columbia County.

== Route description ==
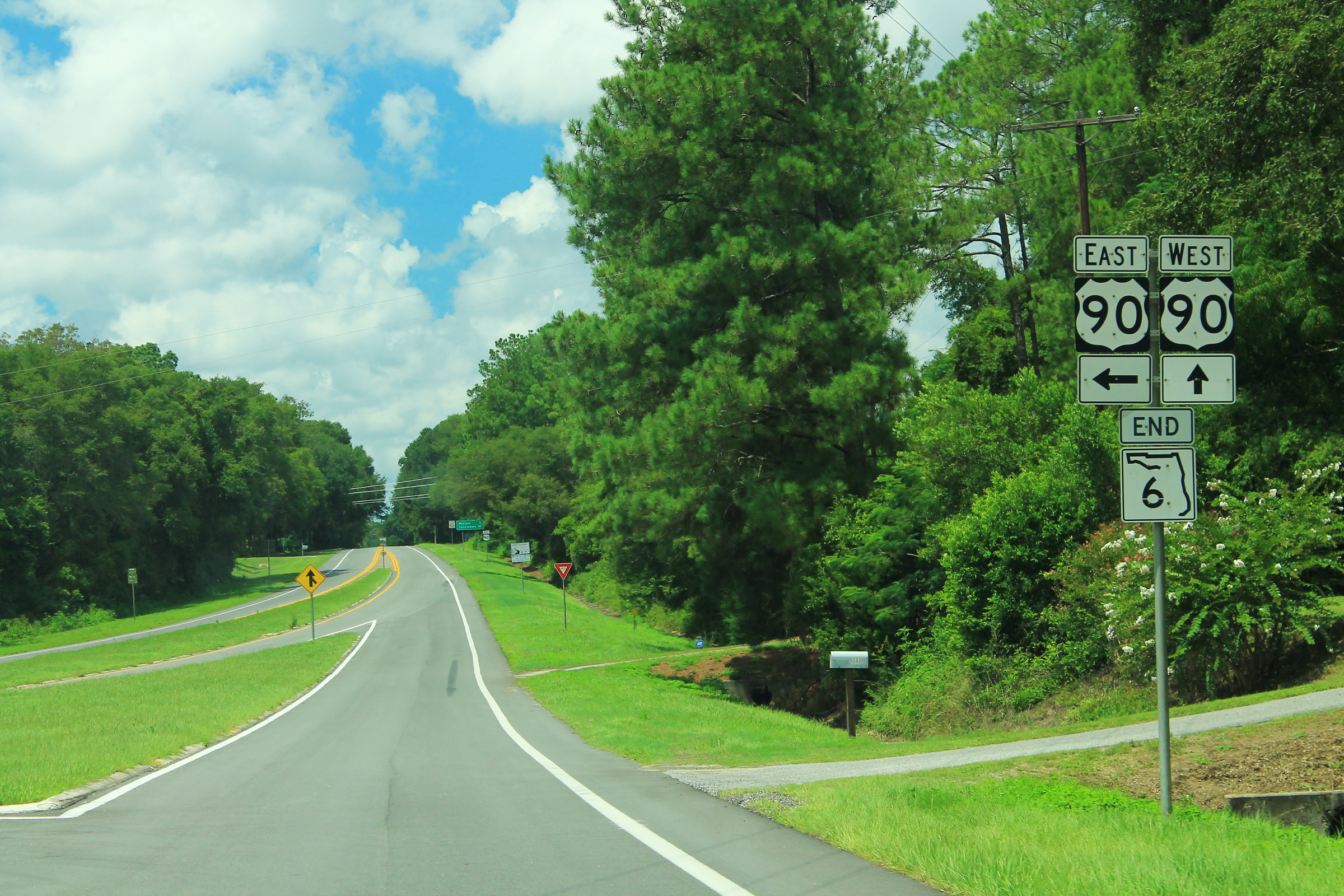
Western terminus at US 90 near Madison

State Road 6 begins at a fork in the road along US 90 east of Madison, where US 90 briefly becomes a two-lane divided highway as it curves to the southeast. SR 6 remains relatively straight as it intersects some county and local roads, such as CR 255 north of Lee, CR 414 (Old Blue Springs Road), and CR 413. East of the driveway to a Nestlé water bottling plant, it passes through Madison Blue Spring State Park. Crossing over the Withlacoochee River and thus the Madison-Hamilton County Line, SR 6 enters the Withlacoochee Tract of the Twin Rivers State Forest in Blue Springs, where it encounters an intersection with County Road 143, a county extension of State Road 143. The roads briefly overlap along the southern border of Blue Springs Longleaf Tract of the Twin River State Forest. The next community is Crossroads, where it intersects CR 141, which includes a driveway to the Cross Roads Motor Speedway that can be found on the southeast corner.

After the intersection with CR 751, SR 6 curves to the northeast, where it intersects only a few local streets and a power line right of way north of West 44th Street. Northeast of the eastern terminus of CR 146 it runs under a diamond interchange with Interstate 75 (I-75) at exit 460. From there it curve slightly towards the east again at the intersections of Northwest 38th Way and Southwest 78th Place, and then joins southbound US 41 (hidden SR 25), where both routes curve to the southeast and immediately run over a bridge over the Alapaha River. Here SR 6 and US 41 both continue to run southeast until CR 148 (Northwest 86th Boulevard), where they begin to curve straight east as they enter the City of Jasper, suddenly meeting an at-grade interchange with US 129/SR 100 From there, all routes run to the southeast again until they reach Fifth Avenue, where they move onto a local road named Hatley Street. In the heart of the city, the road approaches Central Avenue West and East, which has a former railroad right-of-way running between the two streets. Shortly after this, the multiplexes end as US 41/129 and SRs 25/100 turn south onto State Road 51(Second Avenue Southeast), which becomes County Road 51 north of this intersection, while State Road 6 becomes County Road 6 east of the same intersection, and maintains the name Hatley Street.

=== East of Jasper ===
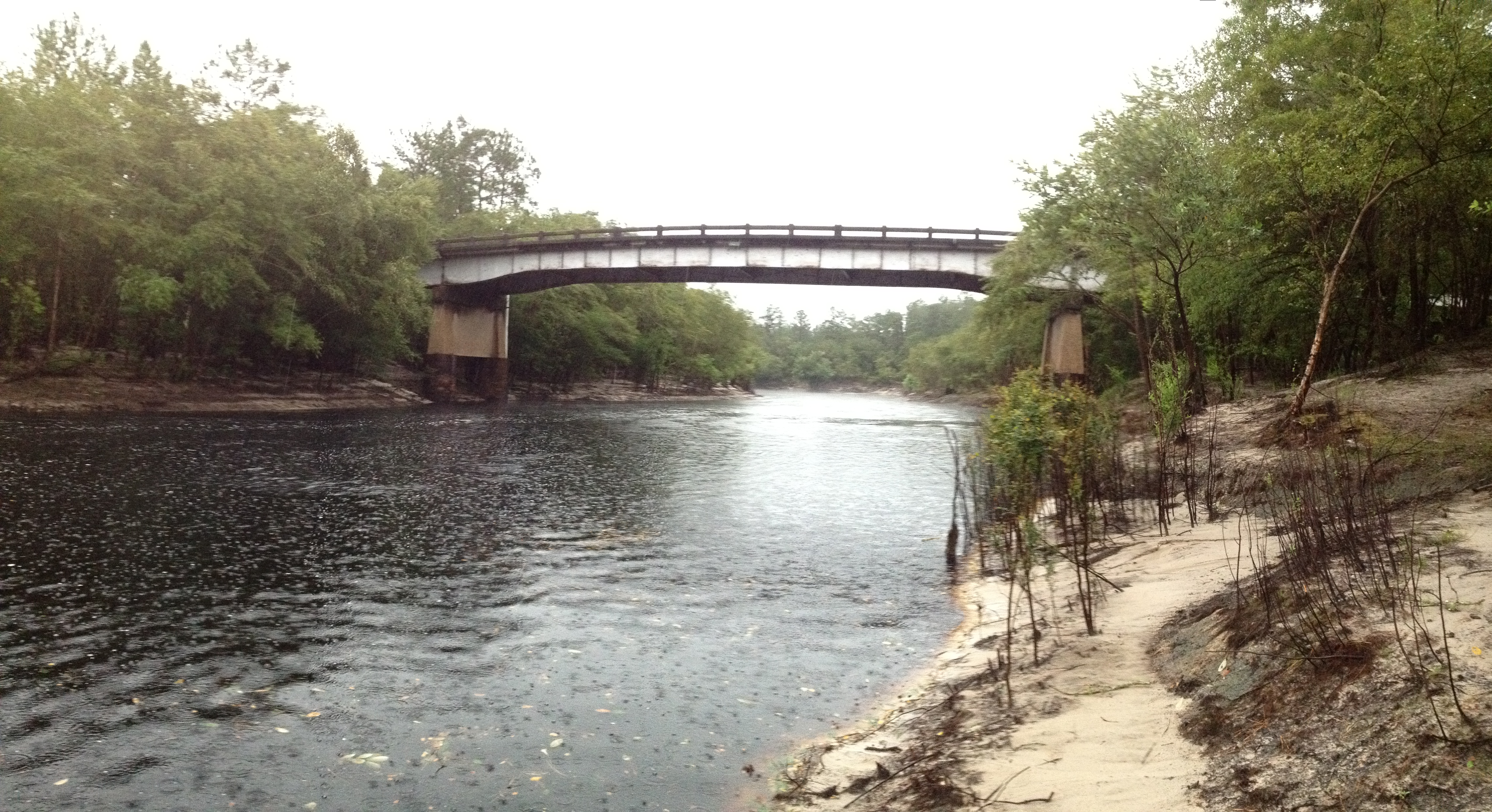
Looking north from the Suwannee River at the CR 6 (former SR 6) Bridge.

Remaining a two lane rural route, CR 6 passes by the Jasper Public Library, before crossing a Georgia Southern and Florida Railway line, where it approaches a small industrial area. Outside of the city limits, the road intersects primarily local streets. The only intersection of any importance is Cypress Creek Road, which leads to its namesake Cypress Creek. The rest of the road winds through the forests of Northern Florida. The last intersection in the county is the slightly more important County Road 135 (Woodpecker Road), which also leads to Cypress Creek as well as Watson, northbound, as well as to White Springs southbound. As the road crosses over the Suwannee River, and thus the Hamilton-Columbia County Line, the name changes to Northwest Bay Creek Street, which remains straight northeast and southwest throughout the county. County Road 6 ends at US 441, south of the Florida-Georgia State Line.

== Major intersections ==
County	Location	mi	km	Destinations	Notes
Madison		0.000	0.000	US 90 (SR 10) – Madison, Lee, Live Oak	
Madison		4.528	7.287	CR 255	
Hamilton	Blue Springs	9.506	15.298	CR 143 north	
Hamilton		10.278	16.541	CR 143 south	
Hamilton	Crossroads	14.789	23.801	CR 141	
Hamilton		16.775	26.997	CR 751 south – Suwannee River State Park	
Hamilton		19.853	31.950	CR 146 west	
Hamilton		20.12	32.38	I-75 (SR 93) – Valdosta, Lake City	Exit 460 on I-75
Hamilton		21.458	34.533	US 41 north (SR 25) – Jennings	West end of US 41 overlap
Hamilton	Jasper	26.358	42.419	US 129 north (SR 100) – Statenville	West end of US 129 overlap
Hamilton	Jasper	26.423	42.524	Northwest 15th Avenue (CR 152 south)	unsigned CR 152
Hamilton	Jasper	27.238	43.835	Southwest First Avenue (CR 249 south)	unsigned CR 249
Hamilton	Jasper	27.352	44.019	Northeast First Avenue (CR 51 north)	unsigned CR 51
Hamilton	Jasper	27.408	44.109	US 41 south / US 129 south (Southeast 2nd Avenue / SR 25 / SR 51 / SR 100) – Live Oak, White Springs CR 6 east (Hatley Street)	East end of US 41 / US 129 overlap; east end of SR 6
1.000 mi = 1.609 km; 1.000 km = 0.621 mi: Concurrency terminus

== See also ==
- List of county roads in Hamilton County, Florida
- List of county roads in Columbia County, Florida
