= List of county roads in Suwannee County, Florida =

- County road shields used in Florida

Highway names
- Interstates: Interstate X (I-X)
- US Highways: U.S. Highway X (US X)
- State: State Road X (SR X)
- County: County Road X (CR X)

System links
- County roads in Florida; County roads in Suwannee County

The following is a list of county roads in Suwannee County, Florida. All county roads are maintained by the county in which they reside.

== County roads in Suwannee County ==
Route	Road Name(s)	From	To	Notes
CR 10A (Live Oak)	Helvenston Street Southeast	US 129	US 90	former SR 10A
CR 10A (Wellborn)	County Road 10A; Oidgo Road	US 90	US 90	former SR 10A
CR 49		US 27-US 129	72nd Trace	former SR 49
CR 132	Stagecoach Road	US 90	US 129	former SR 132
CR 136	233rd Road; Newbern Road; 225th Street; 11th Street; Ohio Avenue; Duval Street	CR 250	I-75 / SR 136	former SR 136
CR 136A		US 129	CR 136	former SR 136A
CR 137		US 27	CR 136	former SR 137
CR 242		184th Street and Southwest Sabre Avenue	Suwannee-Columbia County Line	former SR 242
CR 248		Suwannee River	SR 247	former SR 248
CR 249	Houston Avenue; Nobles Ferry Road	US 90 & hidden SR 249	Suwannee-Hamilton County Line	former SR 249
CR 250		Lafayette-Suwannee County Line	SR 51	former SR 250
CR 250		CR 137	Suwannee-Columbia County Line	former SR 250
CR 252		Charles Springs Conservation Area	Suwannee-Columbia County Line	former SR 252
CR 349		SR 51	US 129	former SR 349
CR 417		US 90	CR 136	former SR 417
CR 795	Houston Avenue; Boys Ranch Road; 24th Street	US 90	145th Road	former SR 795
