= Argyle, Florida =

- Unincorporated community
- Location within Florida
- Coordinates: 30°43′11″N 86°02′40″W
- Country: United States
- State: Florida
- County: Walton
- Elevation: 253 ft (77 m)
- Time zone: UTC-6 (Central (CST))
  - Summer (DST): UTC-5 (CDT)
- ZIP code: 32422
- Area code: 850
- GNIS feature ID: 277944

Argyle is an unincorporated community in Walton County, Florida, United States. The community is located on U.S. Route 90, 4.2 miles (6.8 km) east of DeFuniak Springs. Argyle has a post office with ZIP code 32422.

== History ==
A post office has been in operation at Argyle since 1883. The community was named after Argyle, in Scotland, the homeland of a large share of the first settlers.
