= Suwannee County Airport =

Airport in Florida, U.S.

Coordinates: 30°18′00.45″N 083°01′28.9″W

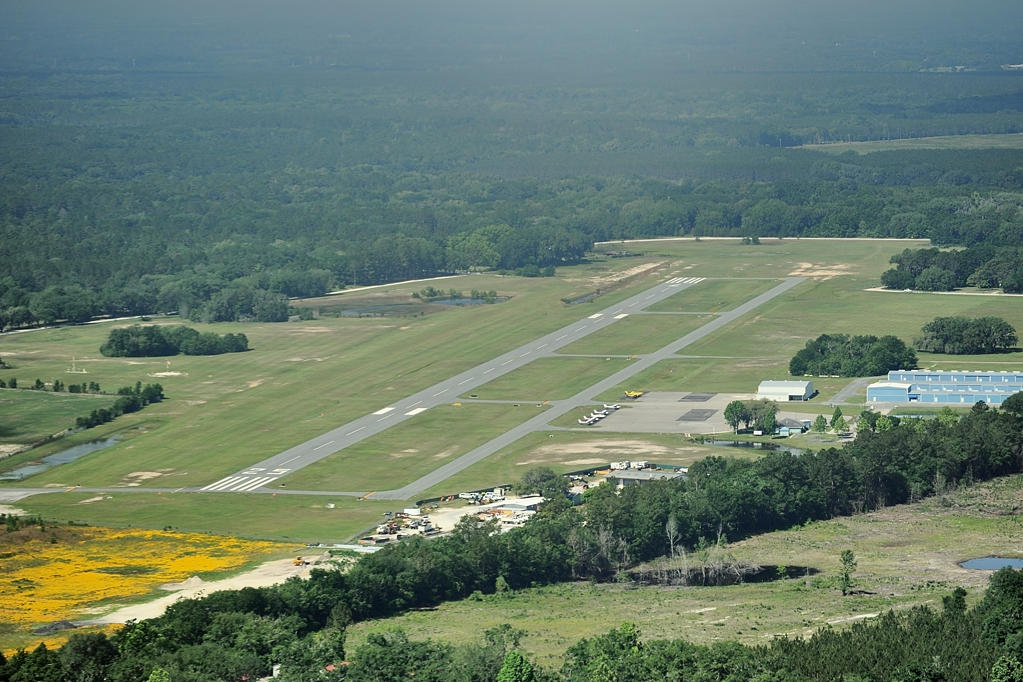
- IATA: none; ICAO: none; FAA LID: 24J

Summary
- Airport type: Public use
- Owner: Suwannee County
- Serves: Live Oak, Florida
- Location: Suwannee County, Florida
- Elevation AMSL: 104 ft / 32 m
- Interactive map of Suwannee County Airport

Runways
Direction	Length		Surface
Direction	ft	m	Surface
07/25	4,037	1,230	Asphalt

Statistics (2009)
- Aircraft operations: 16,300
- Based aircraft: 38
- Source: Federal Aviation Administration

Suwannee County Airport (FAA LID: 24J) is a public-use airport located two nautical miles (3.7 km) west of the central business district of the city of Live Oak in Suwannee County, Florida, United States. The airport is publicly owned. The airport is host to the EAA Chapter 797 which currently operates many festivities in and around the airport. It is also home to the annual Wings Over Suwannee fly-in festival held during every Spring, which is a yearly event organized by several members of the EAA Chapter to expand the local public's use and knowledge of the airport as well as further the education of the next generation of pilots.

== See also ==
- List of airports in Florida
