= Branford High School (Florida) =

Coordinates: 29.9627294°N 82.92485°W

Location
- 405 NE Reynolds St; Branford, Florida; United States

Information
- Type: Public High School
- School district: Suwannee County School District
- Superintendent: Ronnie Gray
- Principal: Cara Disken
- Teaching staff: 39.48 (FTE)
- Grades: 6–12
- Enrollment: 782 (2023–2024)
- Student to teacher ratio: 19.81
- Colors: Orange and royal blue
- Athletics: High school football, Baseball, Basketball, Softball, Cross country running, Volleyball, Golf, Track, Cheerleading
- Mascot: Buccaneer
- Rival: Lafayette County High School
- FCAT (2009–2010) average: A
- Newspaper: The Buccaneer Drift
- Website: bhs.suwannee.k12.fl.us

Branford High School is the only public high school in Branford, Florida, United States. It has multiple different extracurricular activities, these activities include but are not limited to, Marching band, football, cross country, softball, baseball, football, volleyball, and track and field. The graduation rate of BHS is 95%, Branford High School is ranked 287th place in Florida and ranked 5,373rd in the United States.
