= Suwannee River =

396 km (246 mi) river in Florida and Georgia, USA

Suwannee
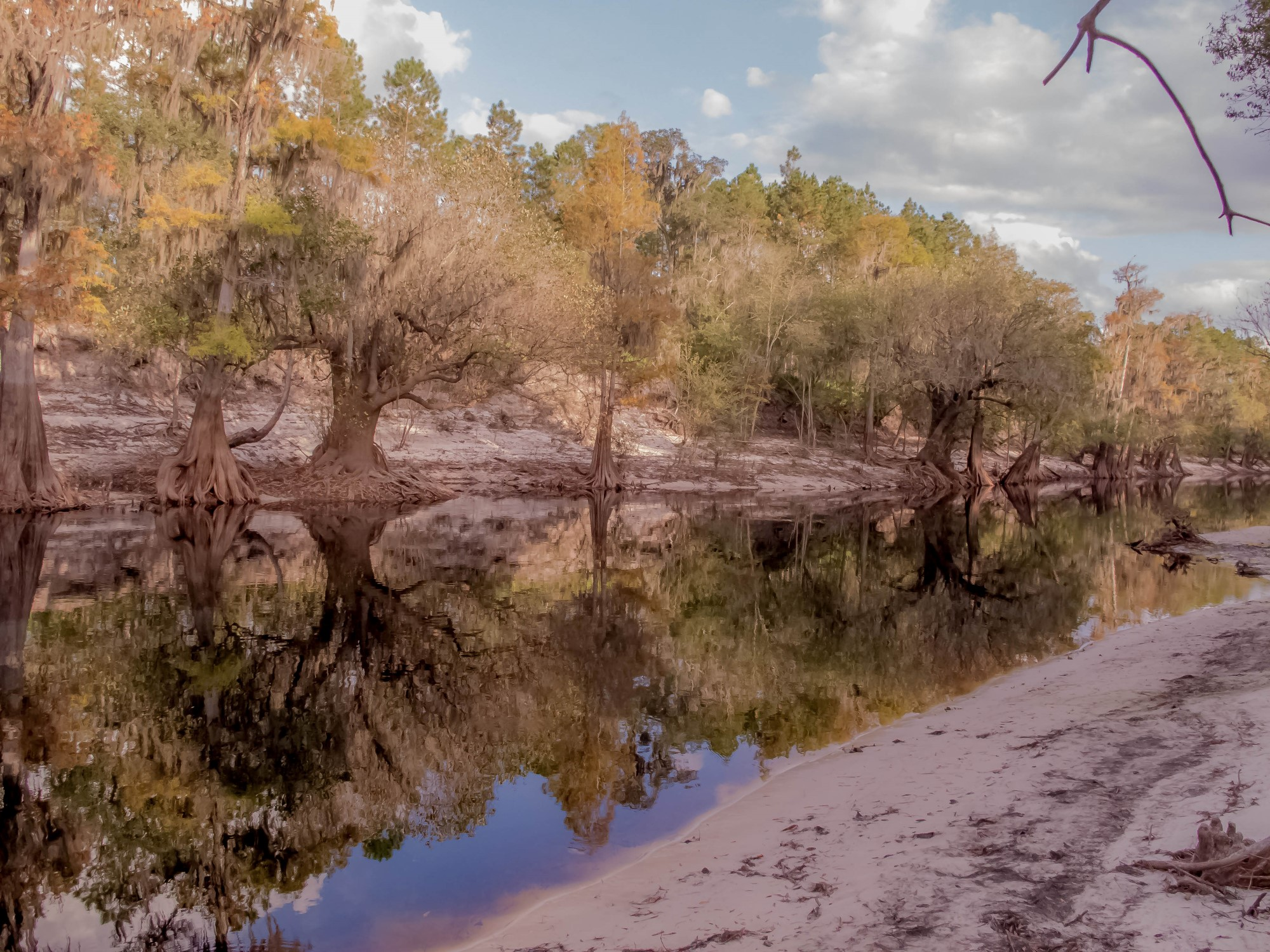
- The Suwannee River near Lake City, Florida

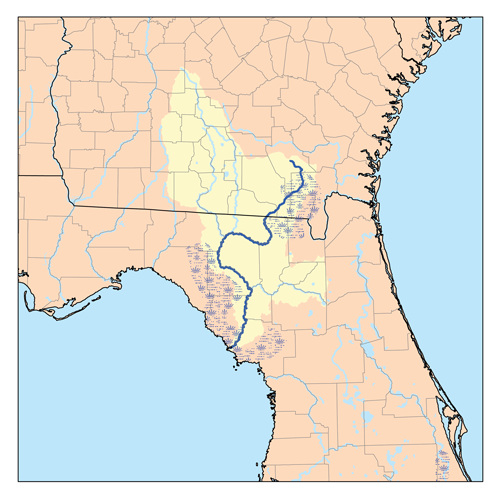
- Suwannee River drainage basin

Location
- Country: United States
- State: Georgia (U.S. state), Florida
- Cities: Fargo, Georgia, White Springs, Florida, Branford, Florida

Physical characteristics
- Source: Okefenokee National Wildlife Refuge
  - location: Fargo, Georgia
- Mouth: Gulf of Mexico
  - location: Lower Suwannee National Wildlife Refuge, Suwannee, Florida
  - coordinates: 29°17′18″N 83°9′57″W
  - elevation: 0 ft (0 m)
- Length: 246 mi (396 km)
- Discharge
  - location: Gulf of Mexico

Basin features
- Tributaries
  - left: Santa Fe River
  - right: Alapaha River, Withlacoochee River

The Suwannee River (also spelled Suwanee River or Swanee River) is a river that runs through south Georgia southward into Florida in the Southern United States. It is a wild blackwater river, about 246 miles (396 km) long. The Suwannee River is the site of the prehistoric Suwanee Straits that separated the Florida peninsula from the Florida panhandle and the rest of the continent. Spelled as "Swanee", it is the namesake of two famous songs: Stephen Foster's "Swanee River" (1851) and George Gershwin and Irving Caesar's "Swanee" (1919).

== Geography ==
The headwaters of the Suwannee River are in the Okefenokee Swamp in the town of Fargo, Georgia. The river runs southwestward into the Florida Panhandle, then drops in elevation through limestone layers into a rare Florida whitewater rapid. Past the rapid, the Suwanee turns west near the town of White Springs, Florida, then connects to the confluences of the Alapaha River and Withlacoochee River.

The confluences of these three rivers form the southern borderline of Hamilton County, Florida. The Suwanee then bends southward near the town of Ellaville, followed by Luraville, then joins with the Santa Fe River from the east, south of the town of Branford.

The river ends and drains into the Gulf of Mexico on the outskirts of Suwannee.

== Etymology ==
The Spanish recorded the native Timucua name of Guacara for the river that would later become known as the Suwannee. Different etymologies have been suggested for the modern name.

- San Juan: D.G. Brinton first suggested in his 1859 Notes on the Floridian Peninsula that Suwannee was a corruption of the Spanish San Juan. This theory is supported by Jerald Milanich, who states that "Suwannee" developed through "San Juan-ee" from the 17th century Spanish mission of San Juan de Guacara, located on the Suwannee River.
- Shawnee: The migrations of the Shawnee (Shawnee: Shaawanwaki; Muscogee: Sawanoke) throughout the South have also been connected to the name Suwannee. As early as 1820, the Indian agent John Johnson said "the 'Suwaney' river was doubtless named after the Shawanoese [Shawnee], Suwaney being a corruption of Shawanoese." However, the primary southern Shawnee settlements were along the Savannah River, with only the village of Ephippeck on the Apalachicola River being securely identified in Florida, casting doubt on this etymology.
- "Echo": In 1884, Albert S. Gatschet claimed that Suwannee derives from the Creek word sawani, meaning "echo", rejecting the earlier Shawnee theory. Stephen Boyd's 1885 Indian Local Names with their Interpretation and Henry Gannett's 1905 work The Origin of Certain Place Names in the United States repeat this interpretation, calling sawani an "Indian word" for "echo river". Gatschet's etymology also survives in more recent publications, often mistaking the language of translation. For example, a University of South Florida website states that the "Timucuan Indian word Suwani means Echo River ... River of Reeds, Deep Water, or Crooked Black Water". In 2004, William Bright repeats it again, now attributing the name "Suwanee" to a Cherokee village of Sawani, which is unlikely as the Cherokee never lived in Florida or south Georgia. This etymology is now considered doubtful: 2004's A Dictionary of Creek Muscogee does not include the river as a place-name derived from Muscogee, and also lacks entries for "echo" and for words such as svwane, sawane, or svwvne, which would correspond to the anglicization "Suwannee".
- "Kikongo language": According to Larry Eugene Rivers, the name Suwanee could be derived from the Bantu word nsubwanyi, translating to "my house, my home" among the Black Seminoles in Florida who spoke an Afro-Seminole Creole and established settlements along the Suwanee river.

== History ==
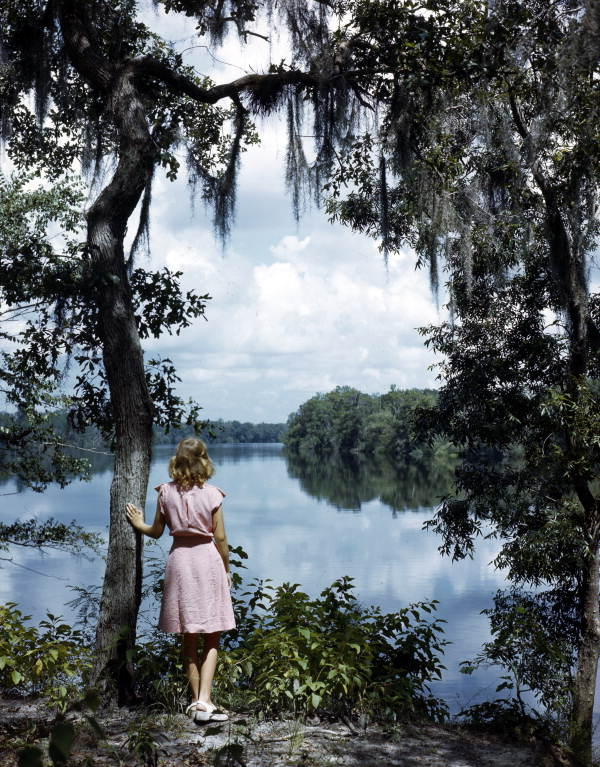
The Suwannee River seen near Fanning Springs in 1949

The Suwannee River area has been inhabited by humans for thousands of years. During the first millennium it was inhabited by the people of the Weedon Island culture, and around the year 900 a derivative local culture known as the Suwanee River Valley culture developed.

By the 16th century, the river was inhabited by two closely related Timucua-speaking peoples: the Yustaga, who lived on the west side of the river; and the Northern Utina, who lived on the east side. By 1633, the Spanish had established the missions of San Juan de Guacara, San Francisco de Chuaquin, and San Augustin de Urihica along the Suwannee to convert these western Timucua peoples.

In the 18th century, Seminoles lived by the river. During the colonial period into the antebellum era, Black Seminoles lived near the river and allied with the Seminoles during times of war.

The steamboat Madison operated on the river before the Civil War, and the sulphur springs at White Springs became popular as a health resort, with 14 hotels in operation in the late 19th century.

=== "Swanee River" ===
The Suwanee (given as "Swanee") is the locale of the protagonist's longed-for home in two famous songs: Stephen Foster's 1851 "Old Folks at Home", which is commonly called by its first line ("Way down upon the Swanee River") or just "Swanee River", and George Gershwin's 1919 song "Swanee" (partly inspired by Foster's song) made a #1 hit by Al Jolson.

The river thus being internationally famous much beyond other rivers of its size and importance, the Suwanee is presumably the referent in the idiom "go down the swanny" (a variation of "go down the river"), meaning "finished, used up, gone to hell".

"Swanee whistle", another name for slide whistle, is also probably based on "swanee" as a variant spelling of "Suwanee".

== Ecology and biota ==
The Suwannee River is a diverse and rich ecological space, hosting varied aquatic and wetland habitats. It is home to a large number of temperate and subtropical species, including unique and endangered ones. The Suwannee alligator snapping turtle, described scientifically only in 2014, is endemic to the Suwannee river basin.

== Recreation ==
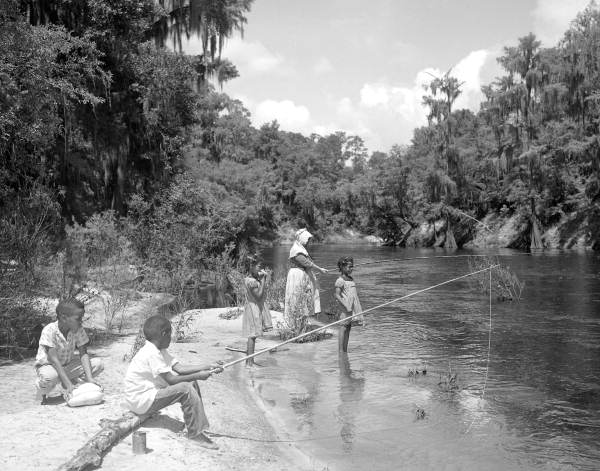
Children fishing on the Suwannnee River, 1957

According to the U.S. Fish & Wildlife Service, "The Lower Suwannee National Wildlife Refuge is unlike other refuges in that it was not established for the protection of a specific species, but in order to protect the high water quality of the historic Suwannee River."

The Suwannee River Wilderness Trail is "a connected web of Florida State Parks, preserves and wilderness areas" that stretches more than 170 miles (274 kilometers), from Stephen Foster Folk Culture Center State Park to the Gulf of Mexico.

The Lower Suwannee National Wildlife Refuge offers bird and wildlife observation, wildlife photography, fishing, canoeing, hunting, and interpretive walks. Facilities include foot trails, boardwalks, paddling trails, wildlife drives, archaeological sites, observation decks and fishing piers.

== Crossings ==
Image	Crossing	Carries	Location	Opened	Closed	ID number	Coordinates
=== Georgia ===
		Suwannee River Sill	Okefenokee National Wildlife Refuge				30.803778°N 82.417672°W
		Norfolk Southern Railway (Former Atlantic, Valdosta and Western Railway line)	Fargo				30.683964°N 82.559503°W
		US 441 / SR 89 / SR 94	Edith to Fargo	1952			30.680902°N 82.559930°W
=== Florida ===
	Turner Bridge (defunct)	Northeast 38th Trail	Cypress Creek Conservation Area		late 1950s		30.524596°N 82.727892°W
		CR 6	Bay Creek Conservation Area	1951		290027	30.507345°N 82.716491°W
	Cone Bridge (defunct)	Cone Bridge Road			late 1960s		30.444933°N 82.671049°W
	Godwin Bridge (defunct)	Godwin Bridge Road			late 1950s		30.350554°N 82.685593°W
		Norfolk Southern Railway (Former Georgia Southern and Florida Railway line)	White Springs				30.326129°N 82.738300°W
	Ed Scott Bridge	US 41	White Springs	1980		290083	30.325815°N 82.738476°W
	J. Graham Black-Joseph W. McAlpin Bridge	SR 136	White Springs	1954		290030	30.328156°N 82.759784°W
		I-75		1962, 1997			30.346492°N 82.832868°W
	Suwannee Springs Bridge (closed)	Former US 129	Suwannee Springs	1931	1974		30.395418°N 82.935808°W
	Old Suwanee Springs Bridge (defunct)	91st Drive	Suwannee Springs		1930s		30.394699°N 82.934293°W
		US 129	Suwannee Springs, Florida	1971		320019	30.398143°N 82.937750°W
		Former Savannah, Florida & Western Railway line (ACL, SBD, CSXT)		186?	1988		30.409236°N 82.951814°W
	Nobels Ferry Bridge	CR 249		1984		320052	30.437103°N 83.091613°W
	Old Nobels Ferry Bridge (defunct)						30.436936°N 83.094566°W
		CSX Transportation (Former Pensacola and Georgia Railroad line)	Ellaville				30.385055°N 83.172333°W
	Hillman Bridge (closed)	Former US 90	Ellaville	1926	1986		30.384711°N 83.174660°W
		US 90	Ellaville	1986		350062	30.384719°N 83.175780°W
		I-10	Suwannee River State Park	1971			30.357776°N 83.193314°W
		CR 250	Dowling Park	1955		370018	30.244572°N 83.249696°W
		Former Live Oak, Perry and Gulf Railroad line	Dowling Park	1957	1977		30.243270°N 83.250864°W
	Hal W. Adams Bridge	SR 51	Luraville	1947		330009	30.099254°N 83.171785°W
	Drew Bridge (closed)	Former Suwannee & San Pedro Railroad line	Mayo	1901	1920		30.101030°N 83.114136°W
	Frank R. Norris Bridge	US 27	Branford	1989			29.955173°N 82.929550°W
	W. O. Cannon - D. W. McCollister Bridge	CR 340		1965		310002	29.795707°N 82.919843°W
		Nature Coast State Trail (Former CSX Transportation line)	Old Town	1907-1909			29.608282°N 82.971233°W
	Joe H. Anderson Sr. Bridge	US 19 / US 98 / US 27 Alt.	Fanning Springs	1963		300031, 300061	29.591323°N 82.937398°W

== See also ==
- List of Florida rivers
- List of Georgia rivers
- South Atlantic–Gulf water resource region
- Swanee (disambiguation)
