= Florida State Road 136 =

State highway in Florida, United States

State Road 136
- Thunder Road
- Florida State Road 136 highlighted in red

Route information
- Maintained by FDOT
- Length: 3.396 mi (5.465 km)

Major junctions
- West end: I-75 near Pouchers Corner
- East end: US 41 in White Springs

Location
- Country: United States
- State: Florida

Highway system
- Florida State Highway System; Interstate; US; State; Former; Pre‑1945; Toll; Scenic
← SR 134	→ SR 139

State Road 136 (SR 136), locally known as Thunder Road, is a 3.396-mile-long (5.465 km) east–west route in Suwannee, Columbia and Hamilton Counties. Its western terminus is just west of Interstate 75 and is a continuation of County Road 136 in rural Suwannee County. Its eastern terminus is US 41 in White Springs.

== Route description ==
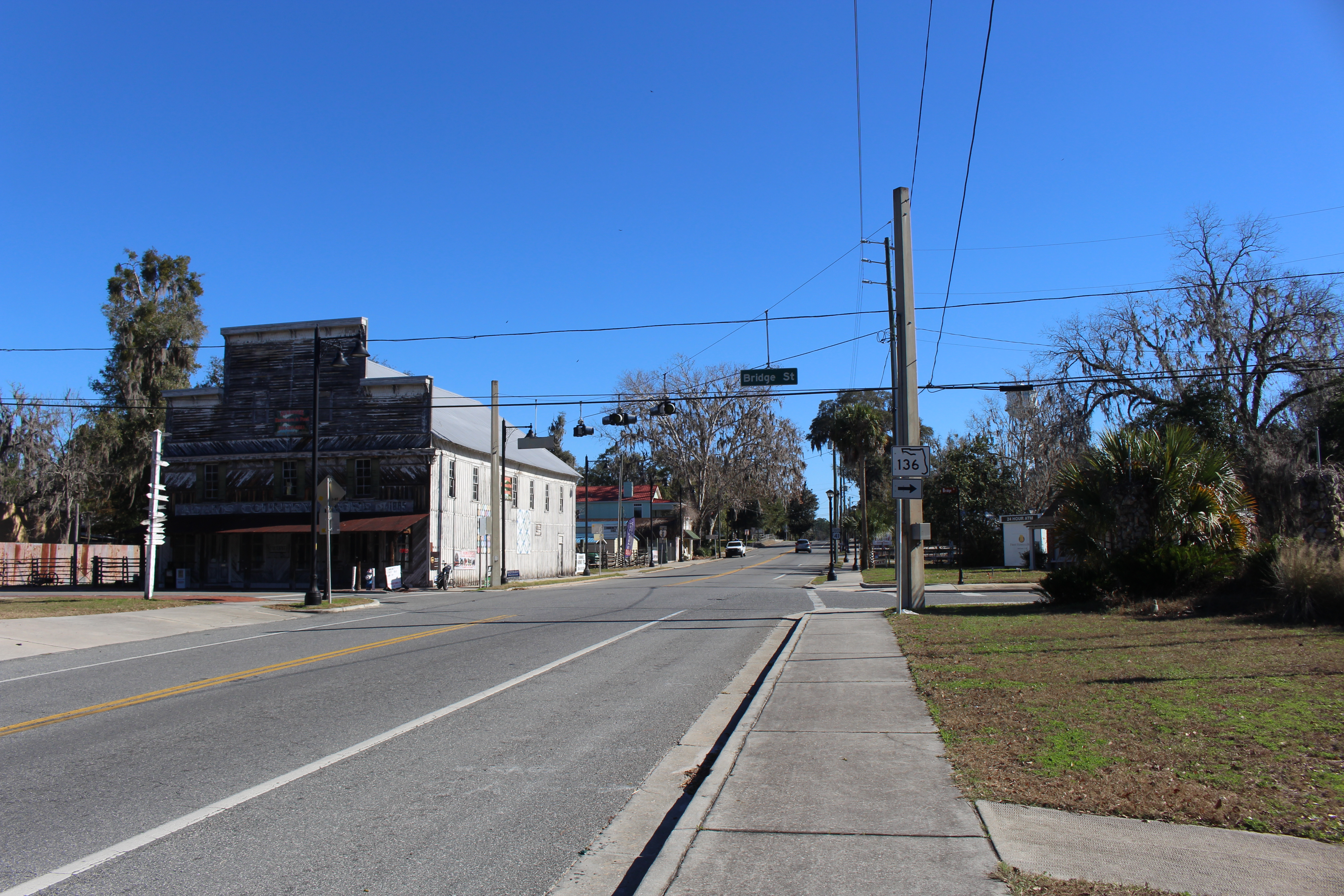
Eastern terminus of Florida State Road 136 with US 41 in White Springs.

For the most part, SR 136 serves as an access road from Interstate 75 to White Springs. The State Road designation begins 0.061 miles (0.098 km) west of I-75, where County Road 136 ends. The road then enters Columbia County, travelling about 3 miles (4.8 km) before crossing the Suwannee River into Hamilton County. Upon entering Hamilton County (and the city of White Springs), the road is renamed Bridge Street. The State Road designation terminates at US 41 (SR 25), but Bridge Street continues north as a local road.

== Major intersections ==
County	Location	mi	km	Destinations	Notes
Suwannee		0.000	0.000	west end of state maintenance	
Suwannee		0.24	0.39	I-75 (SR 93) – Jasper, Lake City	I-75 exit 439
Columbia	No major junctions				
Suwannee River		3.26	5.25	J. Graham Black-Joseph W. McAlpin Bridge	
Hamilton	White Springs	3.396	5.465	US 41 (SR 25 / SR 100) – Stephen Foster State Park, Big Shoals State Park, Lake City	
1.000 mi = 1.609 km; 1.000 km = 0.621 mi

== Related routes ==
=== County Road 136 ===
County Road 136
- Location: Dowling Park, rural Suwannee County

County Road 136 runs from CR 250 in Dowling Park on 233rd Road, then shifts to the northeast after the intersection with Dowling Park Drive. At some point before the intersection with 225th Road, the street name is changed to Newbern Road. At the shared intersection with 88th Street and another segment of 225th Road, the route turns from straight south-to-north to straight west-to-east. Somewhwew around 143rd Road, Newbern Road changed its name to 11th Street. Suwannee County Road 136 doesn't enter the Live Oak city limits until it intersects Goldkist Boulevard, and then joins State Road 51 at a roundabout with SR 51 and Walker Avenue. CR 139 is overlapped by SR 51 until the intersection with US 129, and both routes turn north to overlap US 129. At Duval Street the route leaves US 129/SR 51 where continues east and winds to the northeast of the city limits. The road briefly passes over Interstate 10 and continue through rural surroundings until it reaches the western terminus of SR 136 west of I-75. CR 136 is a cross-county and mostly rural road, crossing only through the city of Live Oak on its journey.

=== County Road 136A ===
County Road 136A
- Location: Rural Suwannee County

County Road 136A is suffixed alternate of County Road 136 that runs from US 129 in Rixford to CR 136 west of Pouchers Corner.
