= McAlpin, Florida =

- Unincorporated community
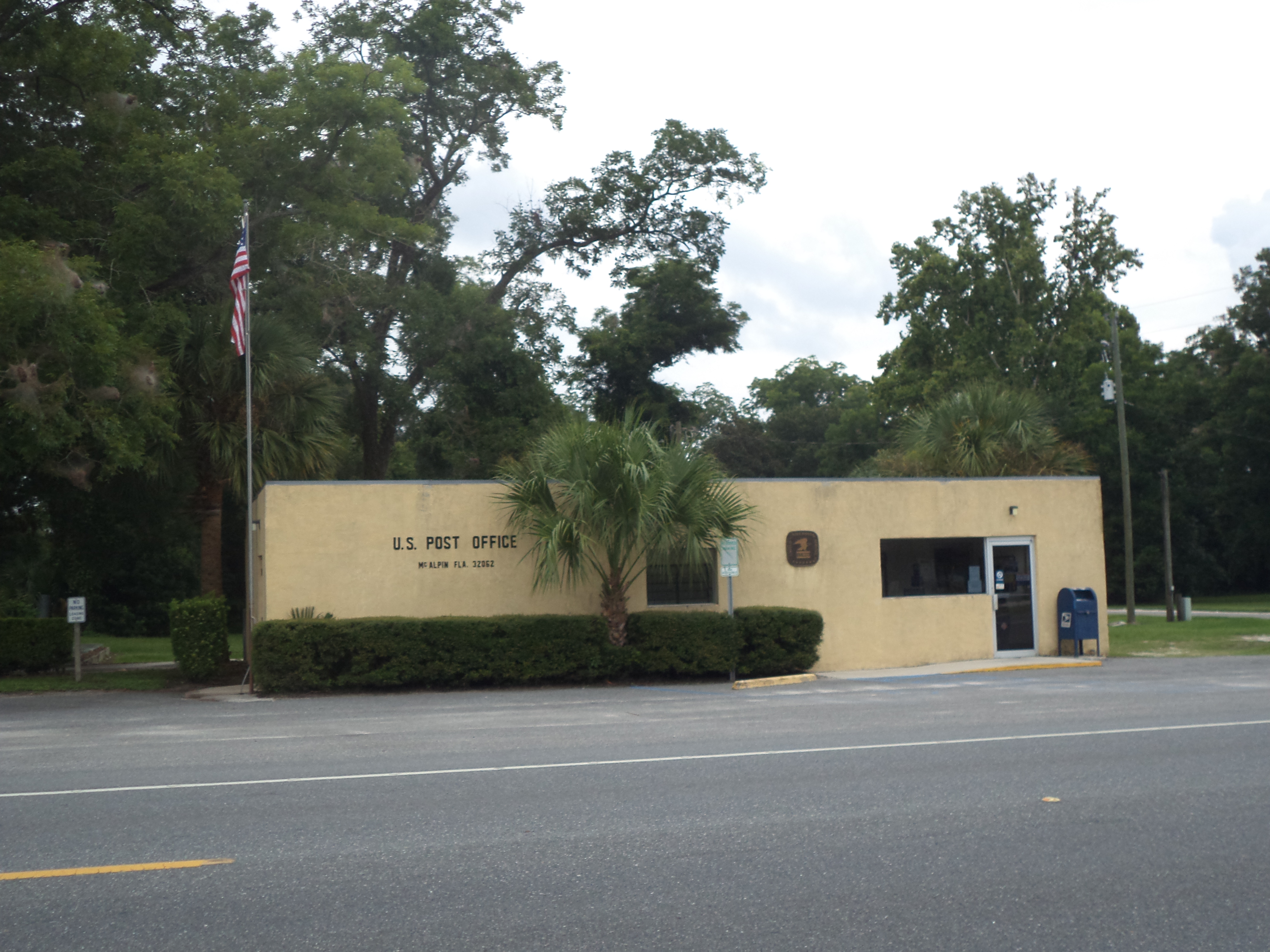
- Post office

- Location within Florida
- Coordinates: 30°08′21″N 82°57′06″W
- Country: United States
- State: Florida
- County: Suwannee
- Elevation: 102 ft (31 m)
- Time zone: UTC-5 (Eastern (EST))
  - Summer (DST): UTC-4 (EDT)
- ZIP code: 32062
- Area code: 386
- GNIS feature ID: 286560

McAlpin is an unincorporated community in Suwannee County, Florida, United States. McAlpin is located on U.S. Route 129, 11 miles (18 km) south of Live Oak. McAlpin has a post office with ZIP code 32062.

== History ==
The town was settled in 1882, and had a population of 30 people by 1886. It was named after Daniel M. McAlpin, who was an early publisher of the Suwannee Democrat after he purchased the local newspaper which was then called the Live Oak Advertiser in 1875 and renamed it the Florida Bulletin. The name was changed to the Suwannee Democrat later.
