= Branford, Florida =

- Town
- Town of Branford
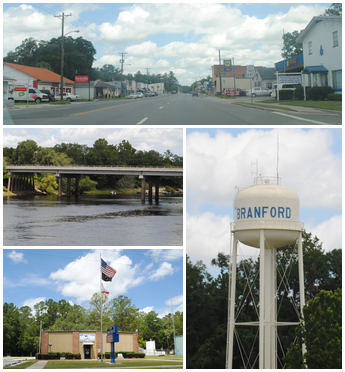
- Top, left to right: Downtown Branford, Suwannee River, Old Branford Town Hall, Branford Water Tower

- Seal
- Mottoes: "On the Banks of the Suwannee River" "Spring Diving Capital of the World" "In God We Trust"
- Location in Suwannee County and the state of Florida
- Coordinates: 29°57′42″N 82°55′38″W
- Country: United States
- State: Florida
- County: Suwannee
- Settled (Rowland's Bluff): c. Late 1800s
- Settled (New Branford): 1886
- Incorporated (Town of Branford): 1961
- Named for: Branford, Connecticut

Government
  - Type: Mayor-Council
  - Mayor: Ken Saunders
  - Council President: Kevin Knighton
  - Councilors: Tera Kelley, Jeremiah McCall, Jay Hatch, and Council Vice President; Alice Childress
  - Town Clerk: Aleshia A. Terry
  - Town Attorney: Rhett Bullard

Area
  - Total: 1.14 sq mi (2.94 km^{2})
  - Land: 1.14 sq mi (2.94 km^{2})
  - Water: 0 sq mi (0.00 km^{2})
- Elevation: 39 ft (12 m)

Population (2020)
  - Total: 711
  - Density: 626.1/sq mi (241.72/km^{2})
- Time zone: UTC-5 (Eastern (EST))
  - Summer (DST): UTC-4 (EDT)
- ZIP code: 32008
- Area code: 386
- FIPS code: 12-08175
- GNIS feature ID: 0279335
- Website: townofbranford.net

Branford is a town in Suwannee County, Florida, United States. The population was 711 at the 2020 census.

== History ==
The Town of Branford was officially incorporated as a municipality in 1961, although it's been settled since the late 1800s, and was expanded and renamed in 1886. The original name was "Rowland’s Bluff" in the late 19th century when the settlement consisted of a sawmill and a ferry crossing across the Suwannee River into Lafayette County. The Savannah, Florida and Western Railway, which became the Atlantic Coast Line Railroad (ACL), was extended by its president, Henry B. Plant, from Live Oak to Branford in 1886, and the community was named "New Branford" after Branford, Connecticut, Henry Plant's hometown. Later the "New" was dropped. Branford was largely destroyed by the 1896 Cedar Keys hurricane, but was rebuilt right afterwards.

== Geography ==
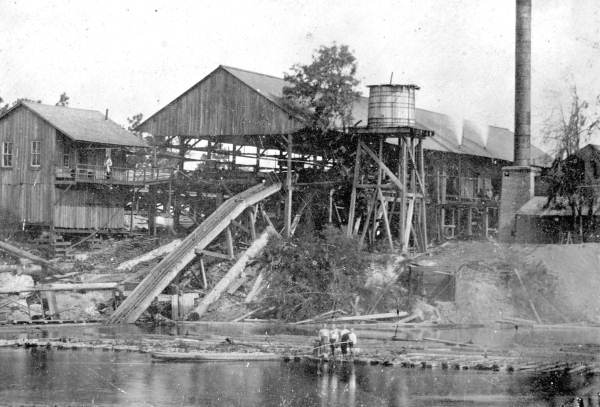
Mill in Branford photographed in the 1870s.

The approximate coordinates for the Town of Branford is located at 29°57′42″N 82°55′38″W (29.961803, –82.927204).

The town is located on the banks of the Suwannee River. U.S. Route 27 and U.S. Highway 129 intersect in Branford.

According to the United States Census Bureau, the town has a total area of 0.8 square miles (2.1 km^{2}), all land.

== Climate ==
The climate in this area is characterized by hot, humid summers and generally mild winters. According to the Köppen climate classification, the Town of Branford has a humid subtropical climate zone (Cfa).

== Demographics ==
Historical population
Census	Pop.	Note	%±
1890	335		—
1910	26		—
1920	708		2,623.1%
1930	498		−29.7%
1940	684		37.3%
1950	753		10.1%
1960	663		−12.0%
1970	820		23.7%
1980	622		−24.1%
1990	670		7.7%
2000	695		3.7%
2010	712		2.4%
2020	711		−0.1%
U.S. Decennial Census

=== 2010 and 2020 census ===
Branford racial composition (Hispanics excluded from racial categories) (NH = Non-Hispanic)
Race	Pop 2010	Pop 2020	% 2010	% 2020
White (NH)	525	524	73.74%	73.70%
Black or African American (NH)	49	35	6.88%	4.92%
Native American or Alaska Native (NH)	6	3	0.84%	0.42%
Asian (NH)	12	8	1.69%	1.13%
Pacific Islander or Native Hawaiian (NH)	5	0	0.70%	0.00%
Some other race (NH)	6	1	0.84%	0.14%
Two or more races/Multiracial (NH)	15	30	2.11%	4.22%
Hispanic or Latino (any race)	94	110	13.20%	15.47%
Total	712	711	100.00%	100.00%

As of the 2020 United States census, there were 711 people, 323 households, and 175 families residing in the town.

As of the 2010 United States census, there were 712 people, 345 households, and 235 families residing in the town.

=== 2000 census ===
As of the census of 2000, there were 695 people, 270 households, and 170 families resided in the town. The population density is 323.3 people/km^{2} (837 people/mi^{2}). There were 320 housing units at an average density of 148.9 units/km^{2} (386 units/mi^{2}). The racial makeup of the town was 87.05% White, 7.05% African American, 0.29% Native American, 0.29% Asian, 0.00% Pacific Islander, 2.73% from other races, and 2.59% from two or more races. 9.50% of the population were Hispanic or Latino of any race.

In 2000, there were 270 households out of which 33.0% had children under the age of 18 living with them, 42.2% were married couples living together, 15.6% had a female householder with no husband present, and 36.7% were non-families. 31.1% of all households were made up of individuals and 17.4% had someone living alone who was 65 years of age or older. The average household size was 2.53 and the average family size was 3.15.

In 2000, in the town the population was spread out with 27.6% under the age of 18, 9.8% from 18 to 24, 28.1% from 25 to 44, 20.6% from 45 to 64, and 14.0% who were 65 years of age or older. The median age was 33 years. For every 100 females there were 90.9 males. For every 100 females age 18 and over, there were 95.7 males.

In 2000, the median income for a household in the town was $24,286, and the median income for a family was $31,705. Males had a median income of $24,583 versus $18,750 for females. The per capita income for the town was $12,716. 21.0% of the population and 13.8% of families were below the poverty line. Out of the total people living in poverty, 17.2% were under the age of 18 and 26.4% are 65 or older.

== Education ==
The public schools within the Town of Branford is served by the Suwannee County School District.

- Branford Elementary School
- Branford High School

== Library ==
The Branford Library is served by the Suwannee River Regional Library System, which contains eight branches and also serves Hamilton and Madison counties.

It is open 6 days per week on Suwannee Avenue.

== Branford Springs ==
On the Suwannee River, Branford Springs within the town is a popular diving spot.

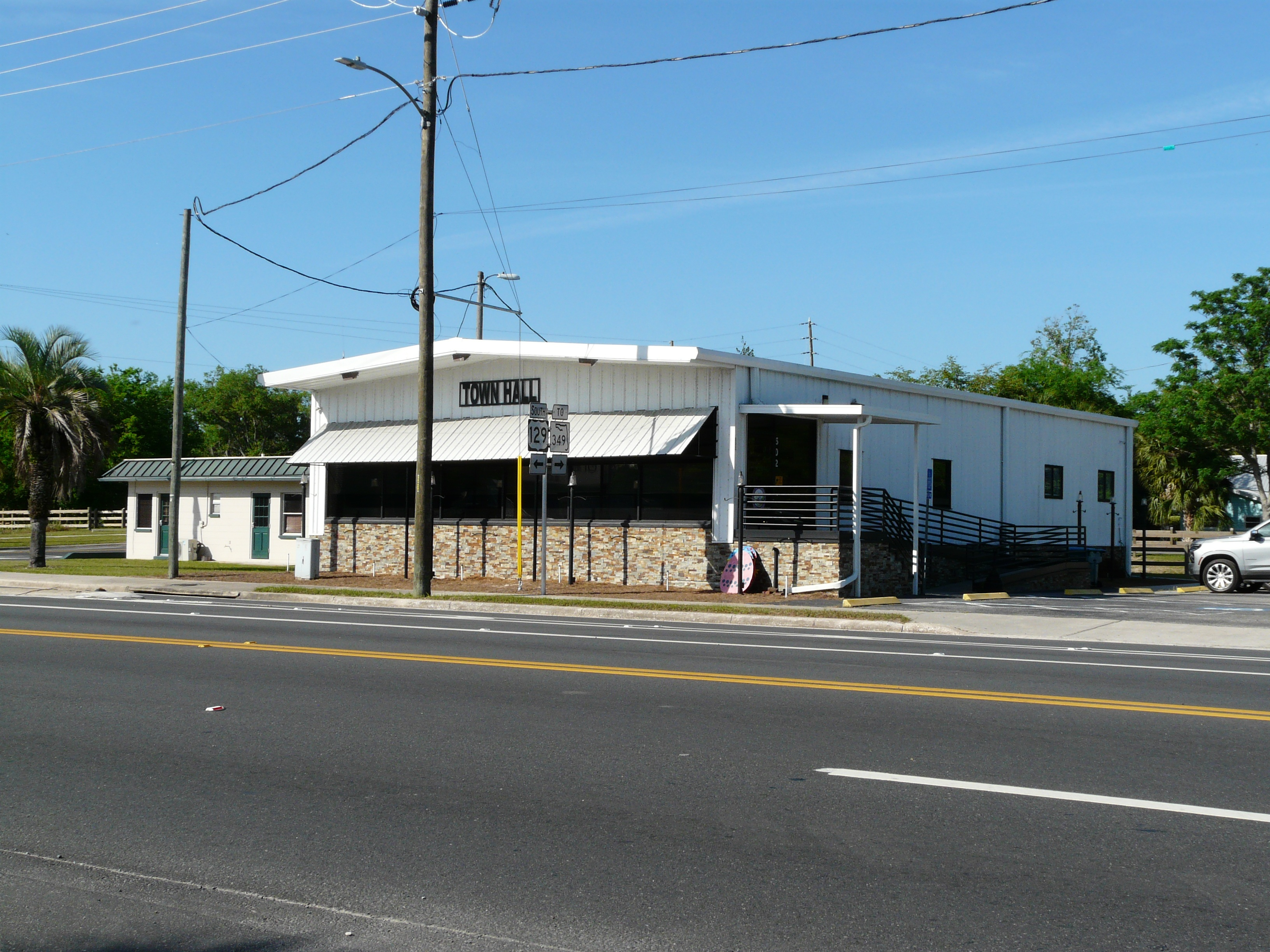
Town Hall in 2026

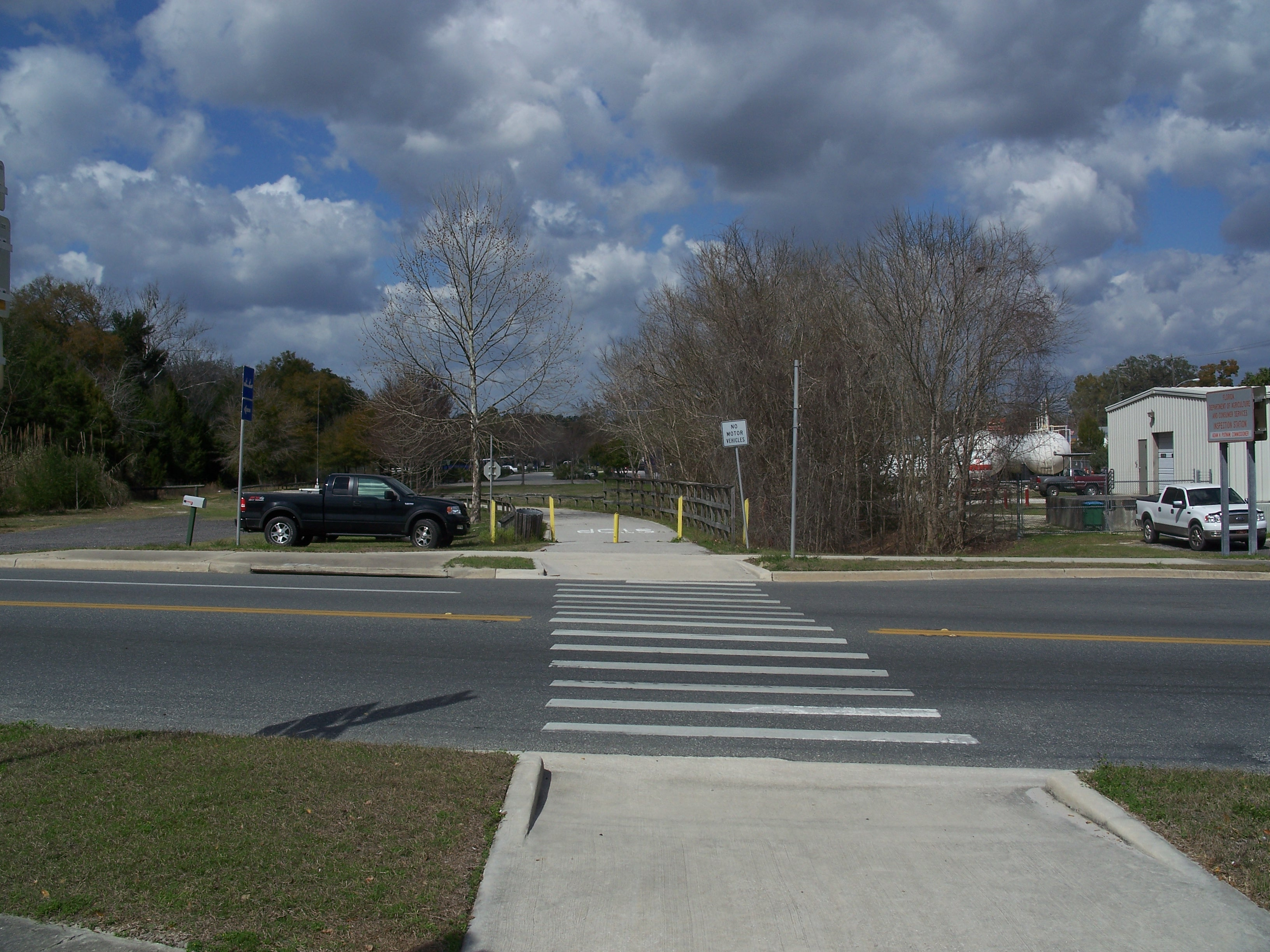
Suwannee River Greenway

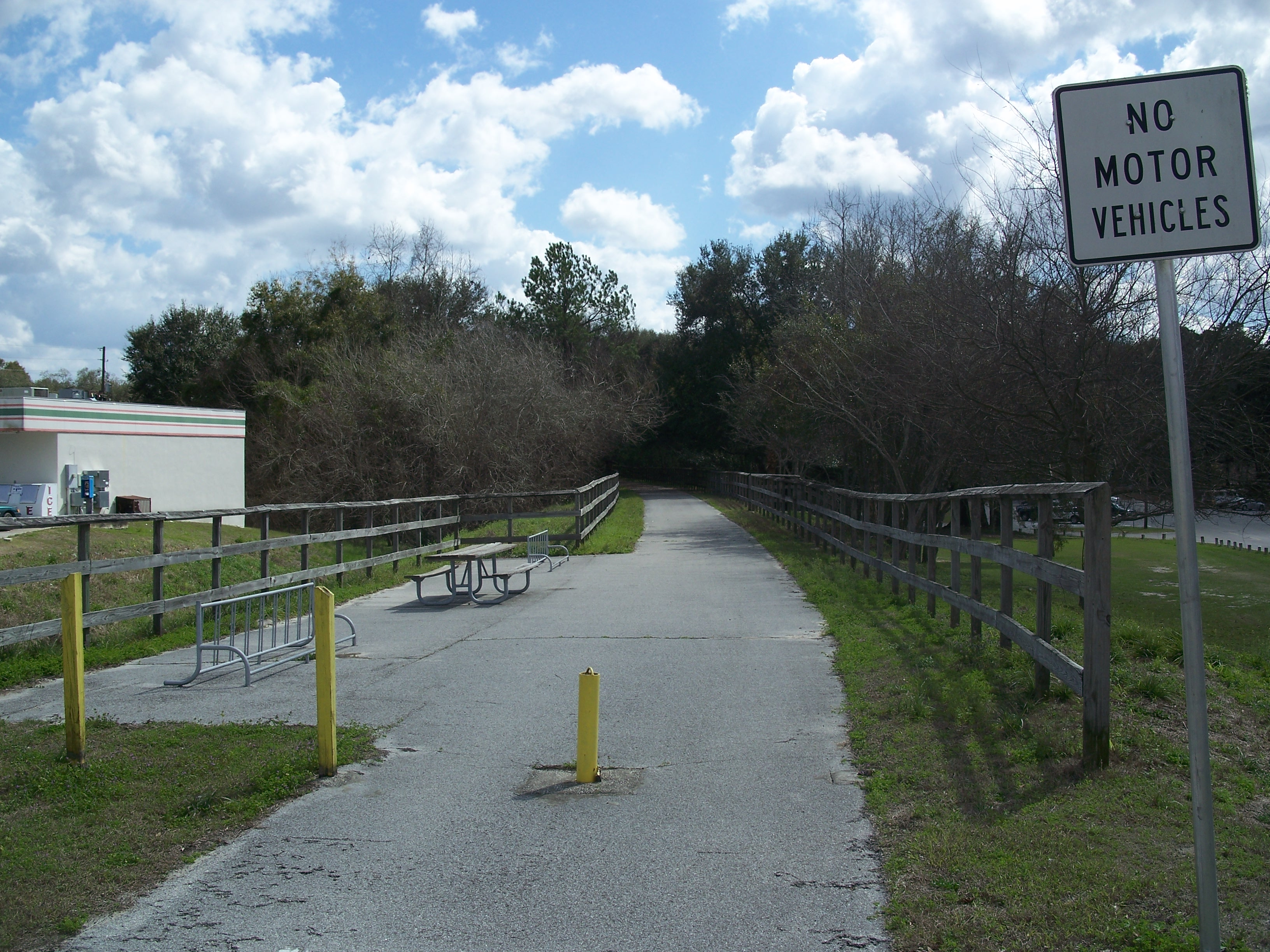
Suwannee River Greenway

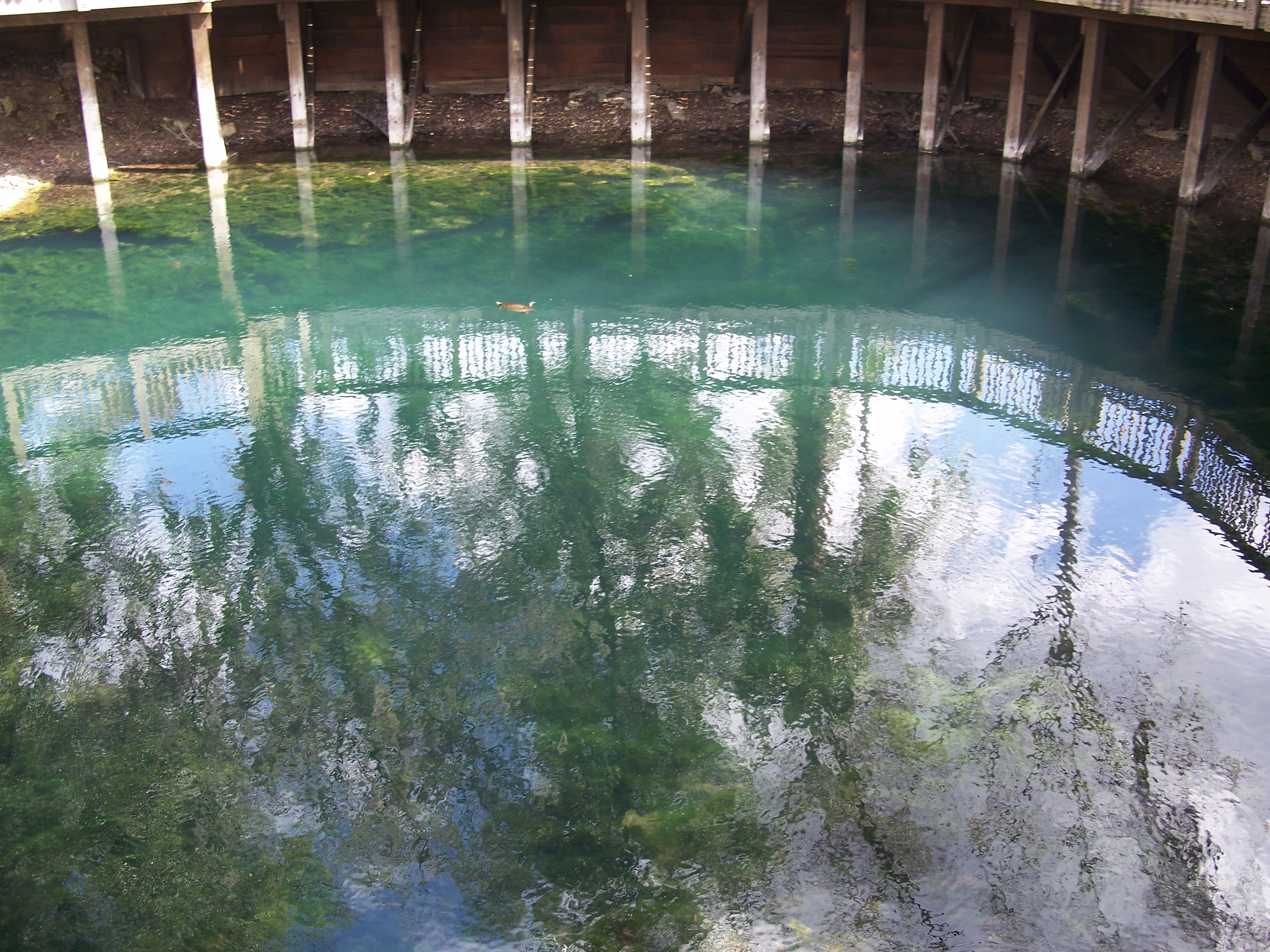
Branford Springs

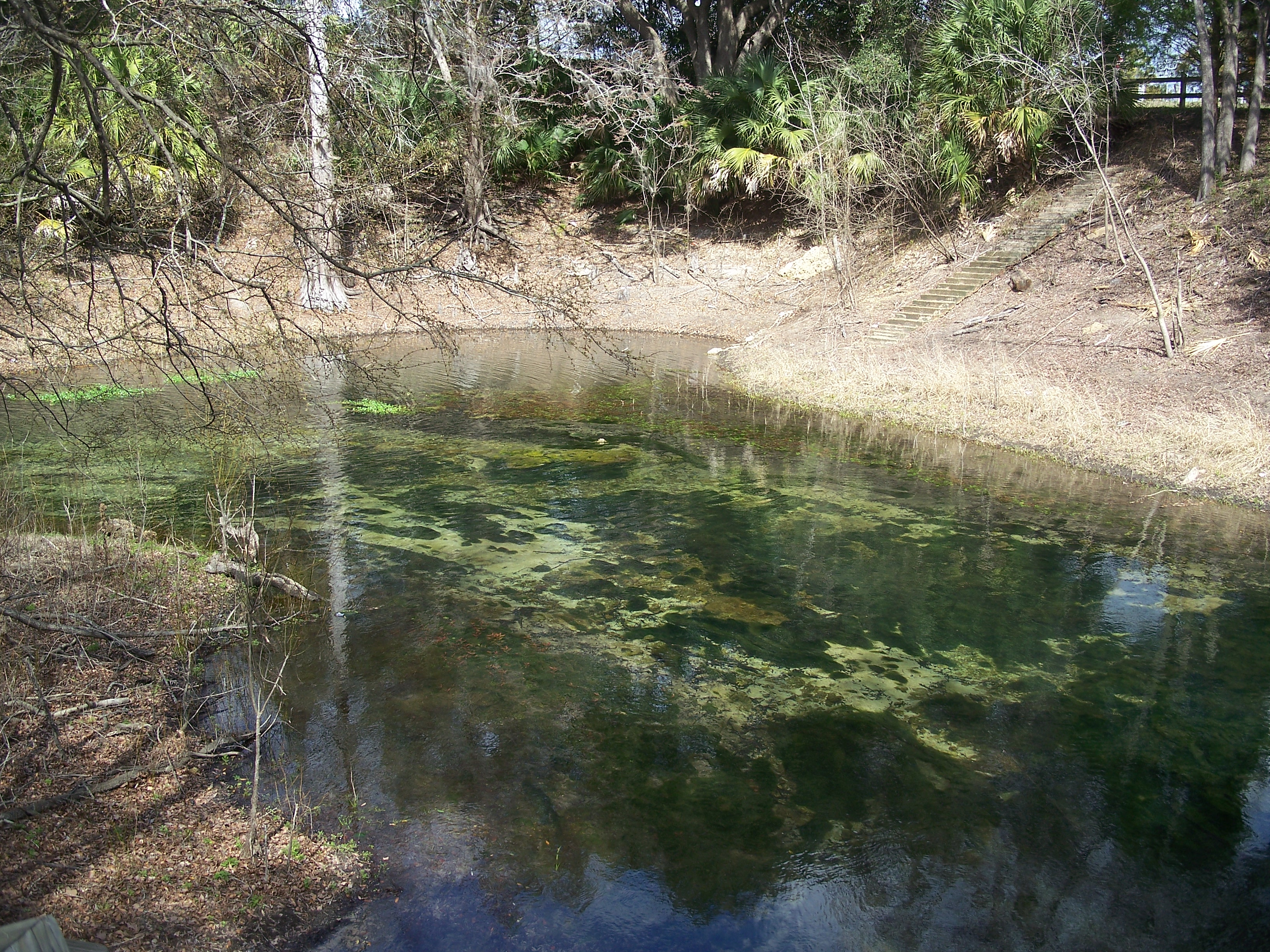
Branford Springs

== See also ==
- Troy Spring State Park
