= U.S. Route 27 in Florida =

Section of U.S. Highway in Florida, United States

U.S. Highway 27
- Claude Pepper Memorial Highway
- US 27 highlighted in red; US 27 Alt. in purple

Route information
- Maintained by FDOT
- Length: 496.352 mi (798.801 km)
- Existed: 1934–present

Major junctions
- South end: US 1 in Miami
- Florida's Turnpike Extension in Hialeah Gardens; I-75 in Weston; US 98 near Sebring; US 17 / US 92 in Haines City; I-4 in Four Corners; Florida's Turnpike in Groveland; I-75 in Ocala; US 41 in High Springs; US 19 / US 98 / US 221 in Perry; I-10 in Tallahassee
- North end: US 27 / SR 1 towards Bainbridge, GA

Location
- Country: United States
- State: Florida
- Counties: Miami-Dade, Broward, Palm Beach, Hendry, Glades, Highlands, Polk, Lake, Sumter, Marion, Levy, Alachua, Columbia, Suwannee, Lafayette, Taylor, Madison, Jefferson, Leon, Gadsden

Highway system
- United States Numbered Highway System; List; Special; Divided; Florida State Highway System; Interstate; US; State; Former; Pre‑1945; Toll; Scenic
← SR 26A	→ US 29
← SR 62	SR 63	→ SR 64

U.S. Highway 27 (US 27) in Florida is a north–south United States Numbered Highway. It runs 496.352 miles (798.801 km) from the Miami metropolitan area northwest to the Tallahassee metropolitan area. Throughout the state, US 27 has been designated the Claude Pepper Memorial Highway by the Florida Legislature. It was named after long-time Florida statesperson Claude Pepper, who served in both the U.S. Senate and House of Representatives. The stretch running from Miami to South Bay was originally designated the Thomas E. Will Memorial Highway by the Florida Legislature in 1937 when that portion was known as State Road 26 (SR 26). Thomas E. Will, the founder of Okeelanta, had worked for almost 20 years to get the state to build a road from Miami to the area south of Lake Okeechobee.

For most of its length in the state, US 27 is largely a four-lane divided highway. However, the highway narrows down to a two-lane roadway for about 103 miles (166 km) between Williston and Perry. US 27 Alternate reduces the distance between the two cites by 10 miles (16 km) and maintains four lanes for its entire length.

Between Miami and Ocala, US 27 follows SR 25; between Leesburg and Williston, it follows SR 500; between Williston and High Springs, it follows SR 45; between High Springs and downtown Tallahassee, it follows SR 20; within downtown Tallahassee, it follows SR 61; and, between Tallahassee and the Georgia border, it follows State Road 63 (SR 63).

Concurrencies include SR 80 between South Bay and Clewiston, SR 78 from Moore Haven to Citrus Center, US 98 between Sebring and western Frostproof, and US 441 between Leesburg and Ocala, which also includes a concurrency with US 301 between Belleview and Ocala. Others include US 41 between Williston and High Springs, SR 20 between High Springs and Tallahassee, US 129 in Branford, US 19 between Perry and Capps, and SR 61 in Tallahassee.

== Route description ==
=== Miami through Central Florida ===
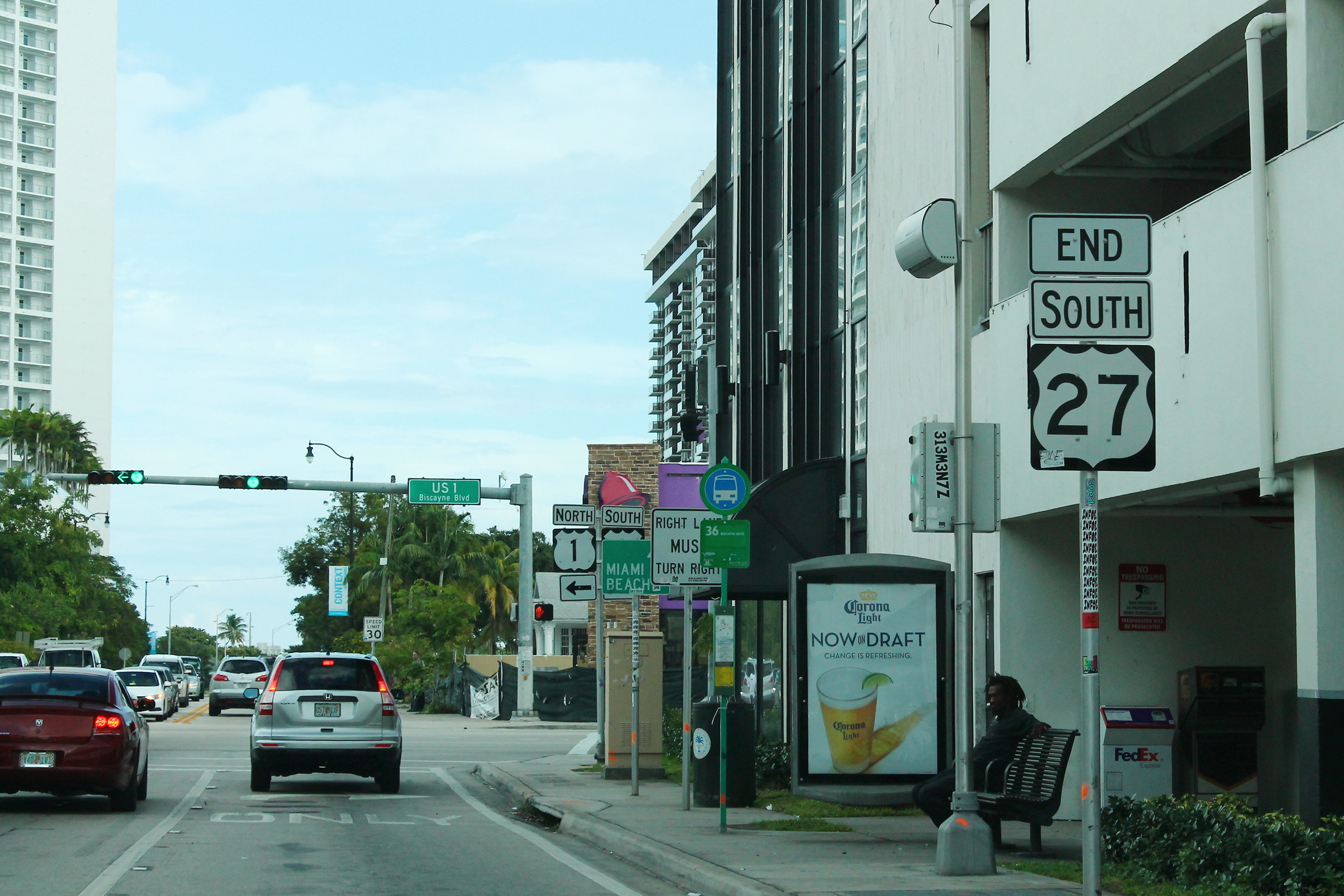
Southern terminus in Miami

US 27 begins its northward journey as North 36th Street in Midtown Miami, heading west from US 1 for 4.4 miles (7.1 km) before turning northwest to pass under the western terminus of SR 112 (Airport Expressway), while also passing under Interstate 95 (I-95) without a direct interchange. It then proceeds northwest for five miles (8.0 km) as South Okeechobee Road, parallel to the Miami Canal, forming the southwest boundary of the city of Hialeah. After an interchange with SR 826 (Palmetto Expressway), it continues northwest as North Okeechobee Road for five miles (8.0 km) before an interchange with the Homestead Extension of the Florida Turnpike. After another four miles (6.4 km), the highway curves to the north and, after passing the northern terminus of SR 997 (Krome Avenue), crosses into Broward County.

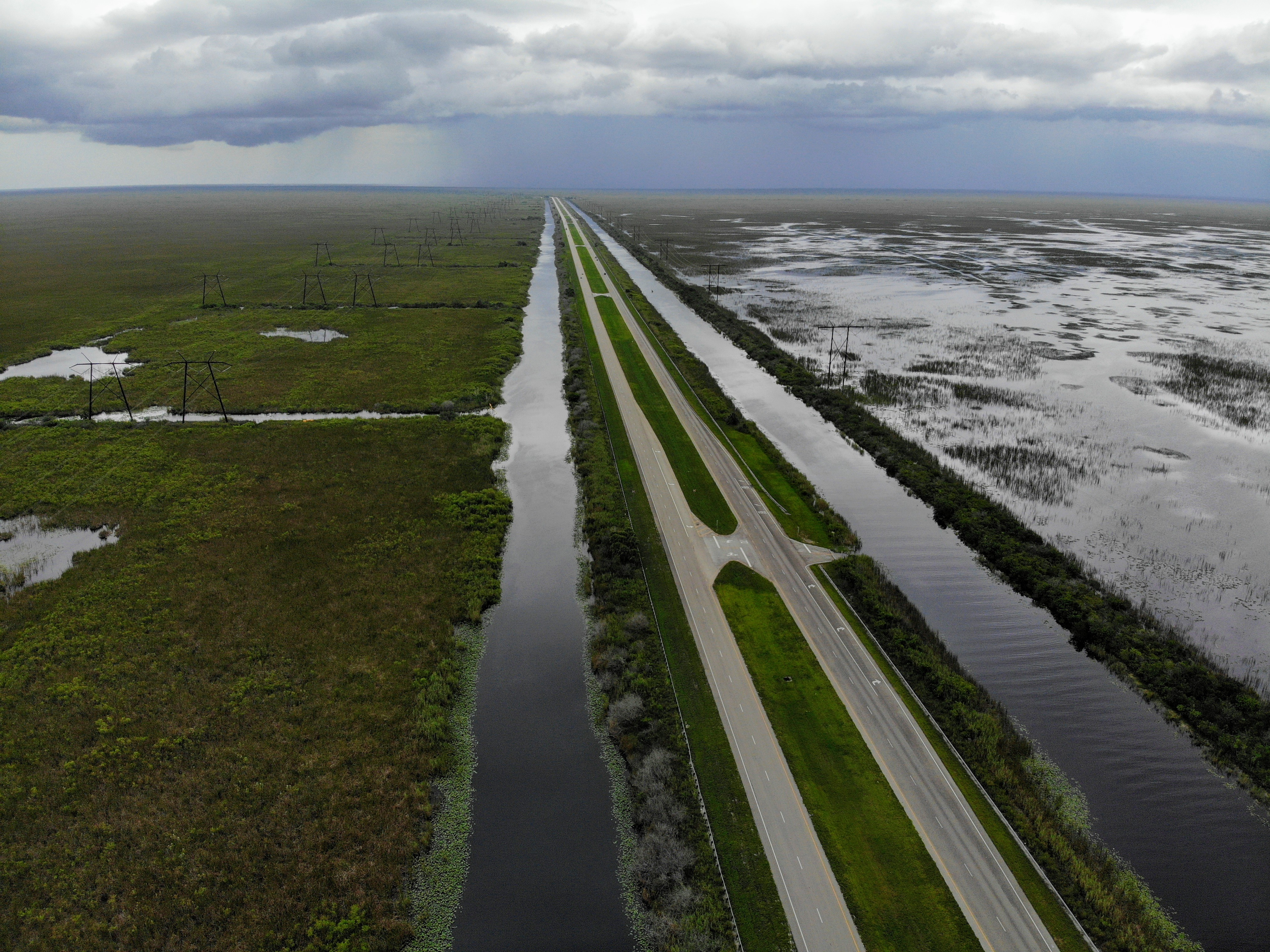
US 27, looking north near the Everglades

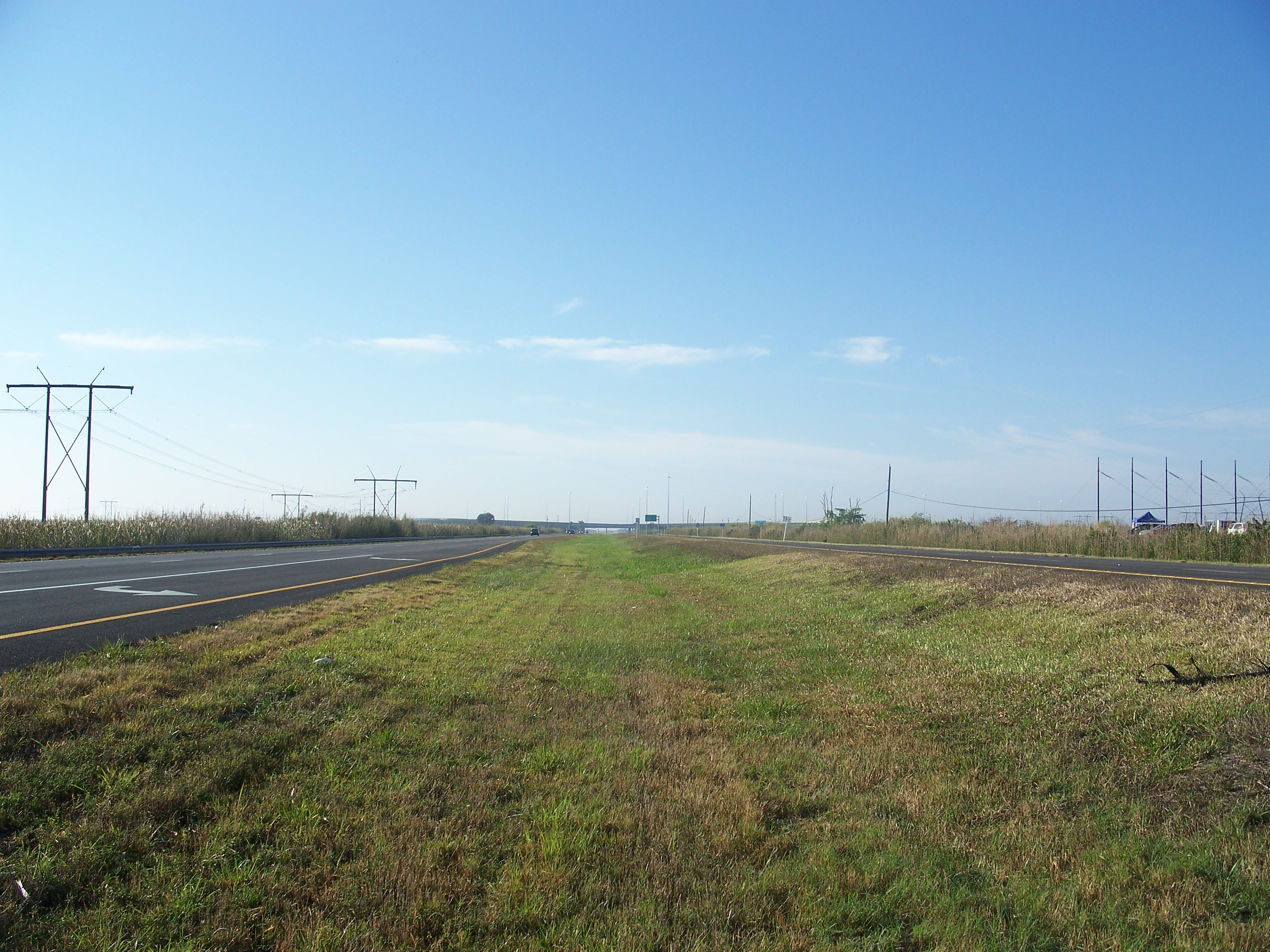
US 27, looking south toward the I-75 interchange

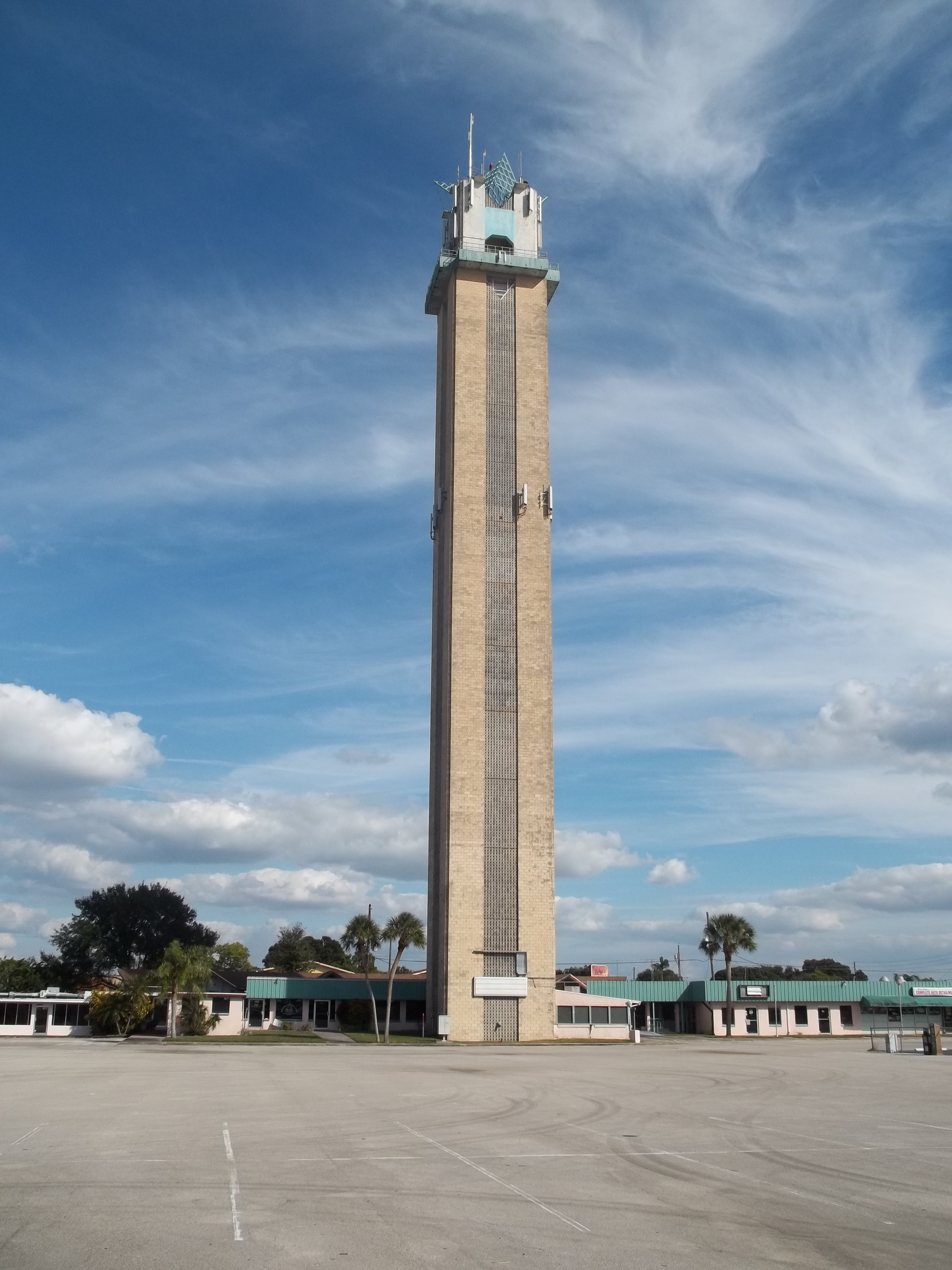
The Lake Placid Tower on US 27, similar to the Citrus Tower further north in Clermont, also on US 27

In Broward County, the highway passes protected wetlands and heavy-duty powerlines on the west and the outer reaches of the suburban communities of Pembroke Pines and Weston on the east where it curves to the northwest. It passes by West Broward High School in Pembroke Pines, in which many school busses coming from SR 822 (Sheridan Street) use US 27 to get to Johnson Street to where the high school is. US 27 then reaches an interchange with I-75 and Alligator Alley (exit 23) which is an elaborate partial cloverleaf interchange with flyovers from US 27, loop ramps from I-75, and no reentry to either road. From here, the road is surrounded by Everglades-related wilderness and recreational areas before curving to the north toward South Bay, where it intersects SR 80 and overlaps the road before curving west along the shores of Lake Okeechobee. The highway skirts the southwestern shore of Lake Okeechobee and then heads west through Lake Harbor and then Clewiston, before making a sharp turn to the north toward Moore Haven, where it crosses the Mamie Langdale Memorial Bridge over the Caloosahatchee Canal and makes another sharp turn to the west. The road then intersects with SR 78, which it overlaps until reaching Citrus Center, then proceeds in a northerly direction toward the central Florida communities such as Lake Placid, where it intersects SR 70.

The southern terminus of the concurrency with US 98 is also the eastern terminus of SR 66. From here, the hidden routes are SR 25 and SR 700. Shortly after this, US 27/US 98 runs through a commercial strip area before curving to the west at a Y intersection along the south shore of Lake Jackson in Sebring, where SR 17 begins. The road heads back to the northwest as it runs along and then away from the edge of the lake. North of here, the road runs west of Lake Sebring, but, in Avon Park, it runs much closer to the shores of Lake Glenada, where it passes through South Florida State College territory. From here, it passes by lakes Lelia and Anoka, and, just east of Avon Park Executive Airport, it intersects SR 64 and the northern terminus of a segment of SR 17. SR 64 continues east along part of SR 17 as a bi-county extension northeast into Polk County which runs through the Lake Wales Ridge State Forest and terminates at the Avon Park Air Force Range. North of here, US 27 carries hidden state routes (SR 17, SR 25, and SR 700) into Polk County until it reaches Sunray Deli Estates, where SR 17 breaks away again, and runs relatively parallel to US 27 until it reaches Haines City. Meanwhile, after making a reverse curve over a bridge above a CSX Transportation railroad line that is used by Amtrak's Silver Star and Silver Meteor lines, US 98 breaks away in western Frostproof, taking SR 700 with it. In the opposite direction of this intersection is a continuation of County Road 630 (CR 630). After passing by Warner University, Crooked Lake Park, and CR 640, US 27 becomes slightly less rural as it approaches an unnumbered partial cloverleaf interchange with SR 60 in Lake Wales. North of this point, US 27 becomes a six-lane highway and remains that way until reaching SR 540 in Waverly, where the road narrows down to four lanes again. The widening of US 27 to a six-lane highway, however, continues in Polk County between here and SR 542 in Dundee. North of here, US 27 runs through Lake Hamilton and curves around the eastern shores of the lake for which the community was named. After passing by a pair of gated communities and crossing over a bridge between Middle Lake Hamilton, and the ironically named larger Little Lake Hamilton, it curves north and intersects SR 544. Taking a turn to the northeast after passing by Lake Henry, US 27 encounters another unnumbered interchange with US 17/US 92 in Haines City and immediately passes over another CSX Transportation railroad line that is used by Amtrak's Silver Star and Silver Meteor lines. With the exception of a segment between Hammock Lake and Tower Lake, most of US 27 remains a commercial strip, especially as it enters Davenport, and approaches quarter-cloverleaf interchanges on the southeast and northwest corners of the bridge over I-4 at exit 55.

=== Four Corners to Santos ===
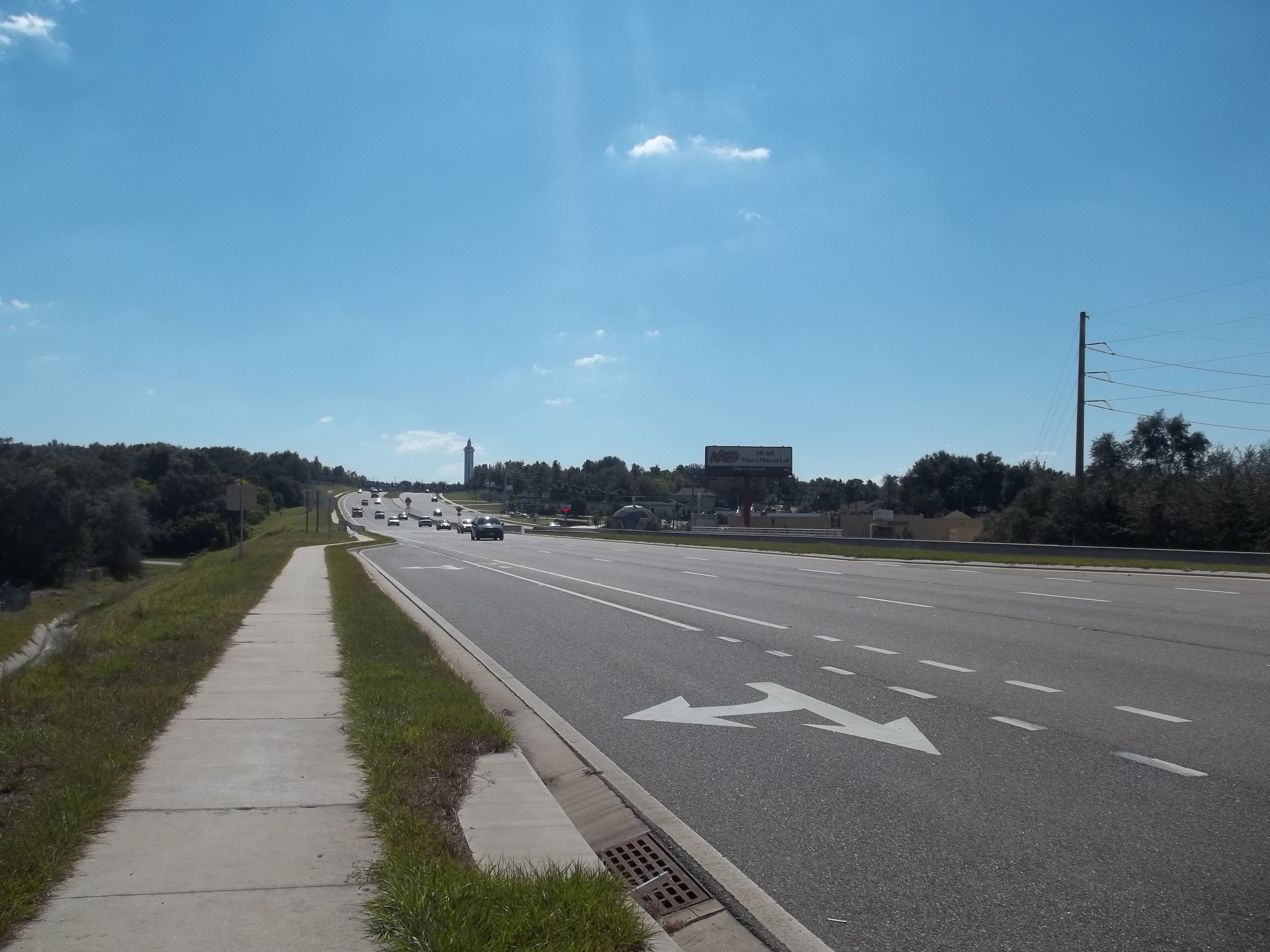
US 27 in Minneola, looking south toward the Florida Citrus Tower

North of I-4, US 27 contains more unnumbered interchanges. The first of which is a trumpet interchange with US 192 (SR 530) on the Polk–Lake county line in Four Corners (named Citrus Ridge until 2014), and shortly afterward, an at-grade intersection with CR 474, although some maps have indicated another interchange here. Most of the road remains a rural four-lane highway with at-grade intersections. After passing by Lake Louisa State Park and winding around the eastern shores of the lake that the park was named for, US 27 approaches a cloverleaf interchange without exit numbers at SR 50 in Clermont. After passing the Florida Citrus Tower and Presidents Hall of Fame, the road enters Minneola along the east side of Lake Minneola, where it crosses a bridge over South Lake Trail, intersects such roads as CR Old 50, as well as CR 561, the latter of which it shares a brief concurrency. After this section, it briefly runs parallel to the southwest side of Florida's Turnpike, until it veers slightly to the west and approaches a quarter-cloverleaf interchange with SR 19 south of Howey-in-the-Hills, which also includes a southbound interchange with Florida's Turnpike. The northbound turnpike interchange can be found further northwest. At Okahumpka, US 27 intersects two county roads that are extensions of state roads. The first of which is CR 48, and the next of which is the northern terminus of CR 33 before running along the western shore of Lake Harris and eastern shore of Lake Denham, the location of Singletary Par also known as the Leesburg Fishing Area. Here, it intersects CR 25A. North of Lake Harris, it enters Leesburg where US 27 has an intersection with SR 44. US 441 later joins US 27, and, as a result, the hidden state routes are officially SR 25/SR 500. SR 500 becomes more prominent however, because in Lady Lake, SR 25 branches away as CR 25. This once served as the southern terminus of the US 27/US 441 Alternate (US 441 Alt.) around Lake Weir into Belleview but still remains a scenic route.

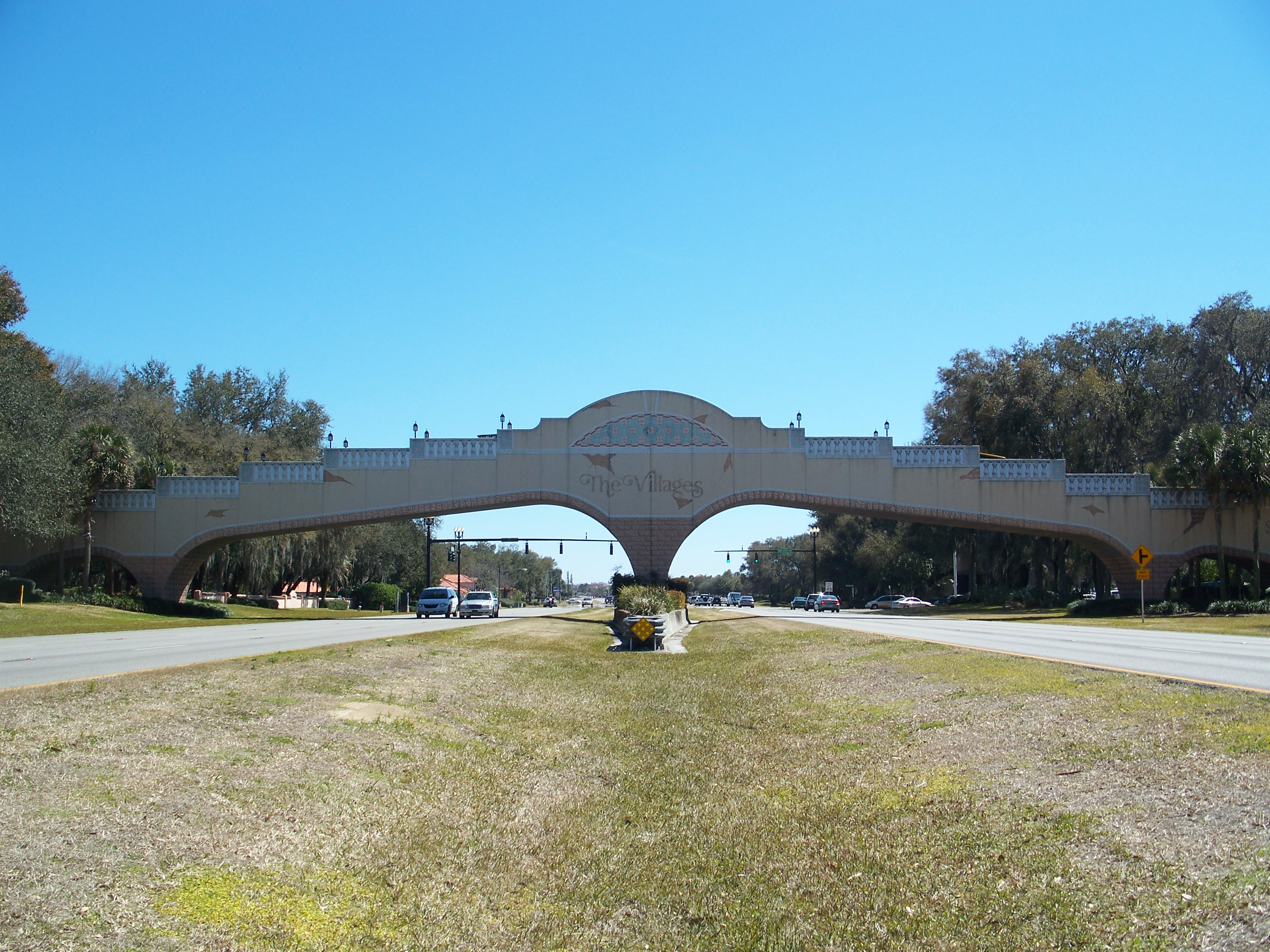
Golf cart bridge over US 27/US 441

Around the Lake–Marion county border, US 27/US 441 enters a retirement community known as The Villages. Because of the frequent use of street-legal golf cars in the community, bridges and tunnels for these carts can be found throughout the road. US 27/US 441 leaves The Villages as it approaches CR 42, a bi-county east–west scenic route through Central Florida. North of here, it serves as the newly constructed bypass that leads to CR 484, in Summerfield. Within Belleview, the road encounters two somewhat important intersections; CR 25A and then SR 35. SR 35 joins US 27/US 441 in a wrong-way concurrency with SR 500 as the road curves more to the west, until it reaches the intersection with US 301, where SR 35 turns south, and SR 500 becomes the hidden state road for US 27/US 301/US 441 for a few blocks. SR 25, however, reunites with the triple concurrency at the former eastern terminus of CR 484, and shares a concurrency with SR 25, and US 27/US 301/US 441's new secret route becomes SR 25/SR 500. After that section, the road curves more to the north again. Near the right-of-way for the formerly proposed Cross Florida Barge Canal, the median for the road widens but narrows back down to normal again. Before it does, however, it intersects CR 328, where a police station exists between the median. Supports for a bridge that was intended to run over the canal exist behind the police station. To the west of this intersection is the Santos Trailhead of the Marjorie Harris Carr Cross Florida Greenway.

=== Santos through High Springs ===
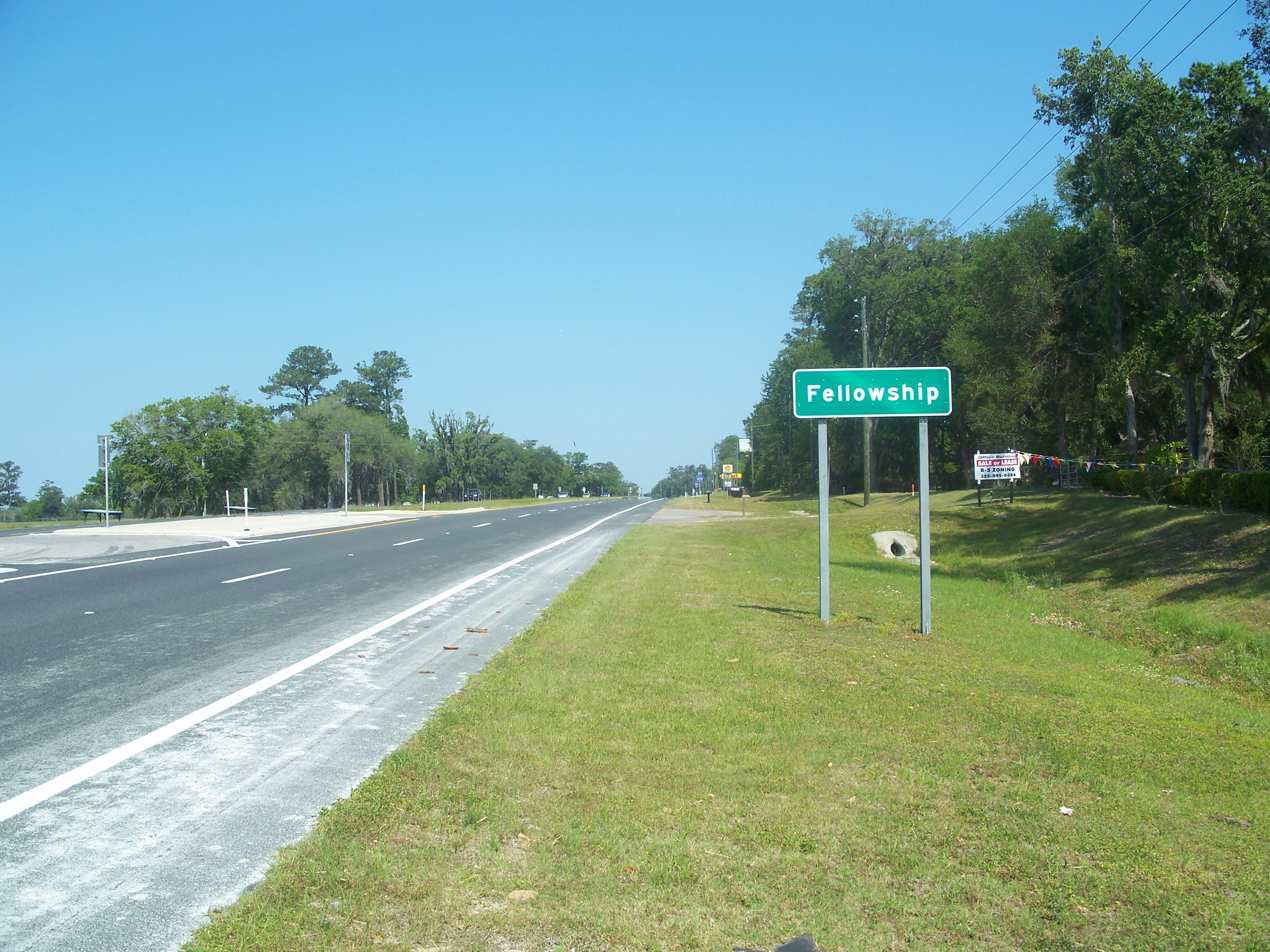
US 27 entering Fellowship from the south

Before US 27/US 301/US 441 enters Ocala, it veers off to the left at an intersection with CR Old 441 (Southeast Lake Weir Avenue), a former segment of US 441 that eventually leads to the Ocala Union Station. The first major intersection after this section is 31st Street. Then, it crosses under a railroad bridge before reaching the city limits and the intersections with the northern terminus of CR 475 and crossing SR 464 (17th Street). US 27/US 301/US 441 intersects with SR 200 (becoming the new hidden state road until US 301 reaches US 1/US 23). The highway reaches the heart of Ocala at the intersection with SR 40 (West Silver Springs Boulevard). After this section, the road crosses a railroad bridge west of Ocala Union Station. Five blocks later, it reaches the intersection of SR 492 (Northwest 10th Street) only to move in the opposite direction, leaving the US 301/US 441 overlap and taking SR 500 with it. After retaining its status as an independent U.S. Highway, US 27 moves from Northwest Tenth Street to Northwest Blitchton Road and has another interchange with I-75 at exit 354, although this one is a mere diamond interchange, as opposed to the elaborate partial cloverleaf interchange with flyovers in Weston. From here, it continues northwest through rural Marion County, much of which is surrounded by horse farms. The few truly significant intersection in this region include CR 464B in Fellowship and then CR 326 near Emathla.

The last intersections at the Marion–Levy county line are with CR 316 and CR 335. Though horse farms are scarce along this segment in Levy County, the surroundings remain rural. CR 316 begins again at an intersection with US 27 in East Williston, and as the road enters the city of Williston, it serves as the western terminus of CR 318, crosses a set of CSX Transportation railroad tracks, and loses its status as an independent U.S. Highway. SR 500 continues straight ahead along US 27 Alt., while US 27 turns north and joins US 41 (hidden SR 45), as well as SR 121, which already ran east for a few blocks along US 27 Alt. The concurrency with SR 121 is short-lived though, as it branches away to the northeast. The US 27/US 41 concurrency is one of the few segments that are only two lanes wide, and it begins to lean to the northwest until briefly shifting straight north before approaching Archer, where it intersects CR 346, then a former Florida Central and Peninsular Railroad right-of-way, and finally SR 24. After SR 24, US 27/US 41 curves back northwest but heads straight northward through SR 26 in Newberry, and both remain as such until US 41 reaches High Springs, joins US 441 toward Lake City, and points north.

=== High Springs to Tallahassee ===
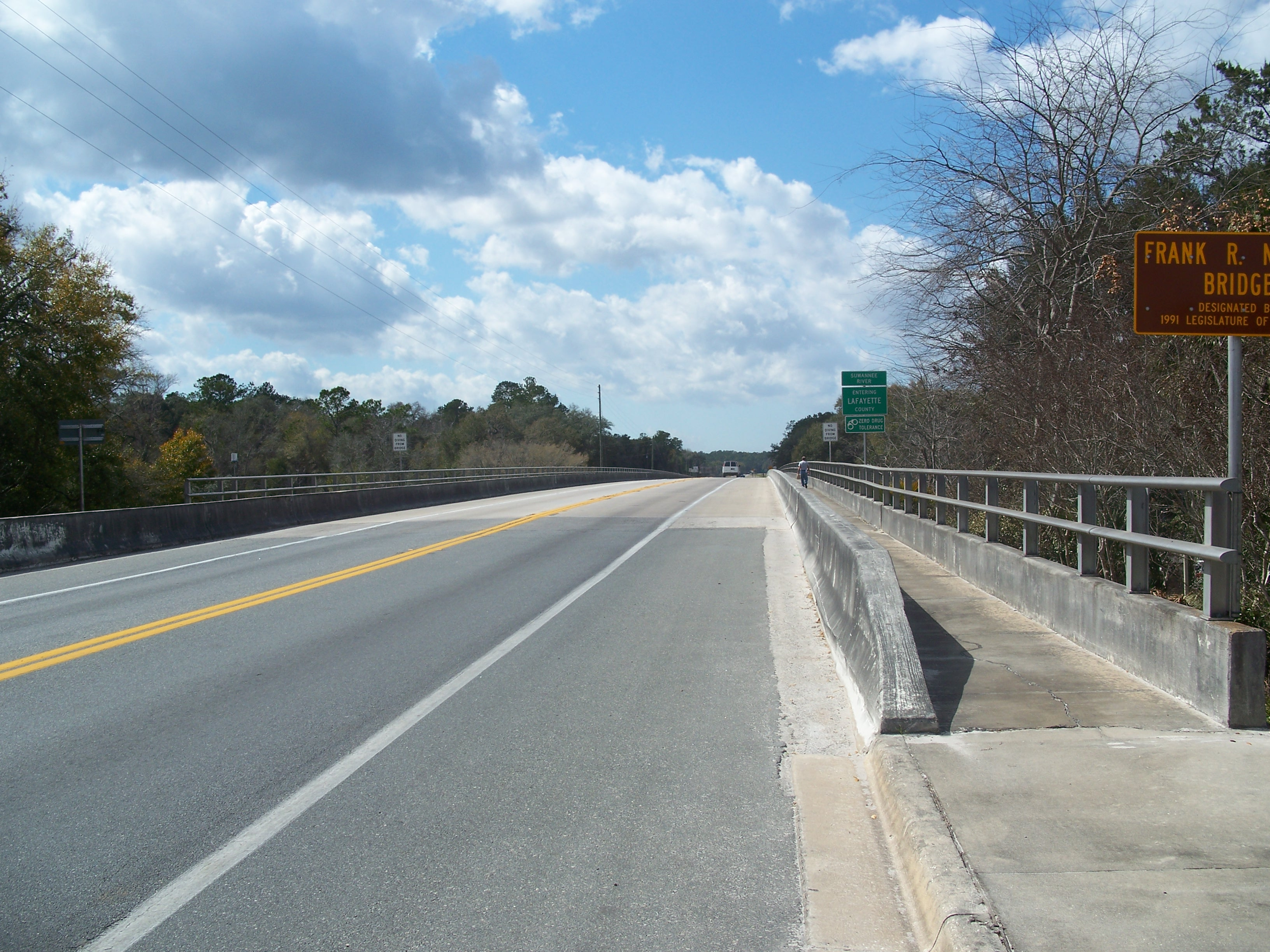
The Frank Norris Bridge in Branford

US 27 heads west along unsigned SR 20, which is named First Avenue until it crosses the Santa Fe River and enters Columbia County. From here, it continues to run northwest but briefly turns straight west after entering Fort White just before intersecting SR 47. The road shifts to the right again and turns northwest before leaving the city but gradually turns back west as it gets closer to Suwannee County. Before the road crosses the Ichetucknee River at the Columbia–Suwannee county line, it intersects with Southwest Riverside Avenue, which serves as the western terminus of the O'Leno to Ichetucknee Trail and the eastern terminus of the Suwannee River Greenway, both of which are along a former Atlantic Coast Line Railroad line. Both US 27 and the trail run through Hildreth, the home of Ichetucknee Springs State Park, and then encounters the east end of a concurrency with US 129 (SR 49) which is also the southern terminus of CR 49. US 27/US 129 and the trail enter the hamlet of Wachtokha, but the trail remains straight while the road curves slightly to the northwest. A slight curve to the southwest is where both routes officially enter Branford where US 129 turns north onto unsigned SR 249. The Suwannee River Greenway crosses US 27 between the west end of the US 27/US 129 concurrency and Frank R. Norris Bridge across the Suwannee River, but it was also once the northern terminus of US 129 Alt., which followed US 27 across the river into Lafayette County until it reached SR 349 in Grady.

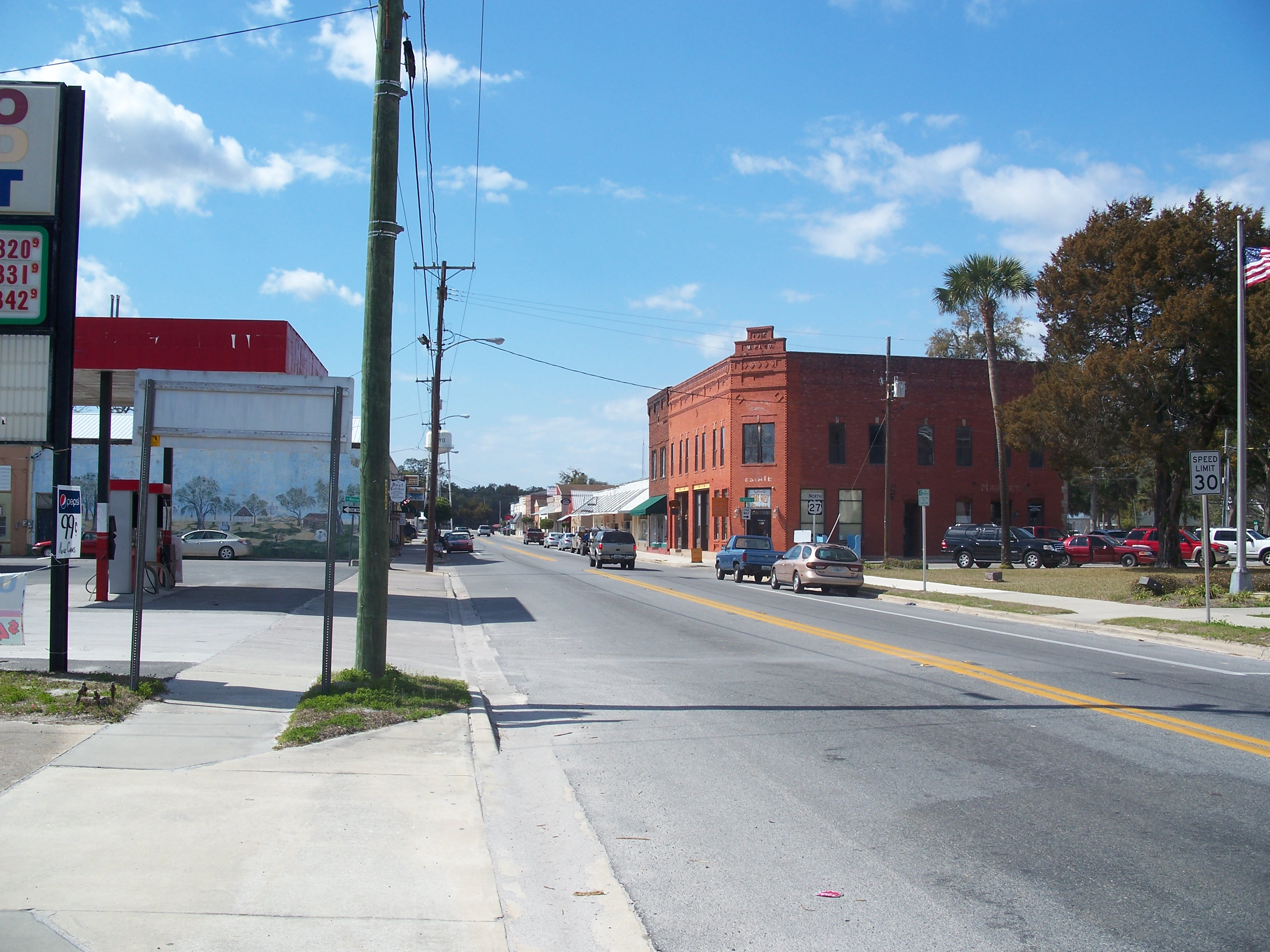
US 27 in Mayo near the SR 51 intersection with the M. Pico Building on the right

The road runs through the rural community of Alton, then slows down as it enters Mayo where it intersects SR 51, the northwest corner of which contains the historic Lafayette County Courthouse. After the intersection of Lafayette Street, the road curves northwest again. Outside the city limits, the road intersects various local roads, the most significant of which is CR 534. The rest of the way, US 27 runs northwest through more of western rural Lafayette County, but it turns straight west again as it approaches Buckville where it intersects the southern terminus of CR 53 and northern terminus of CR 534, both of which were once part of SR 53. The last intersection in Lafayette County is with CR 348 in Townsend before US 27 becomes surrounded by swampland as it enters Taylor County.

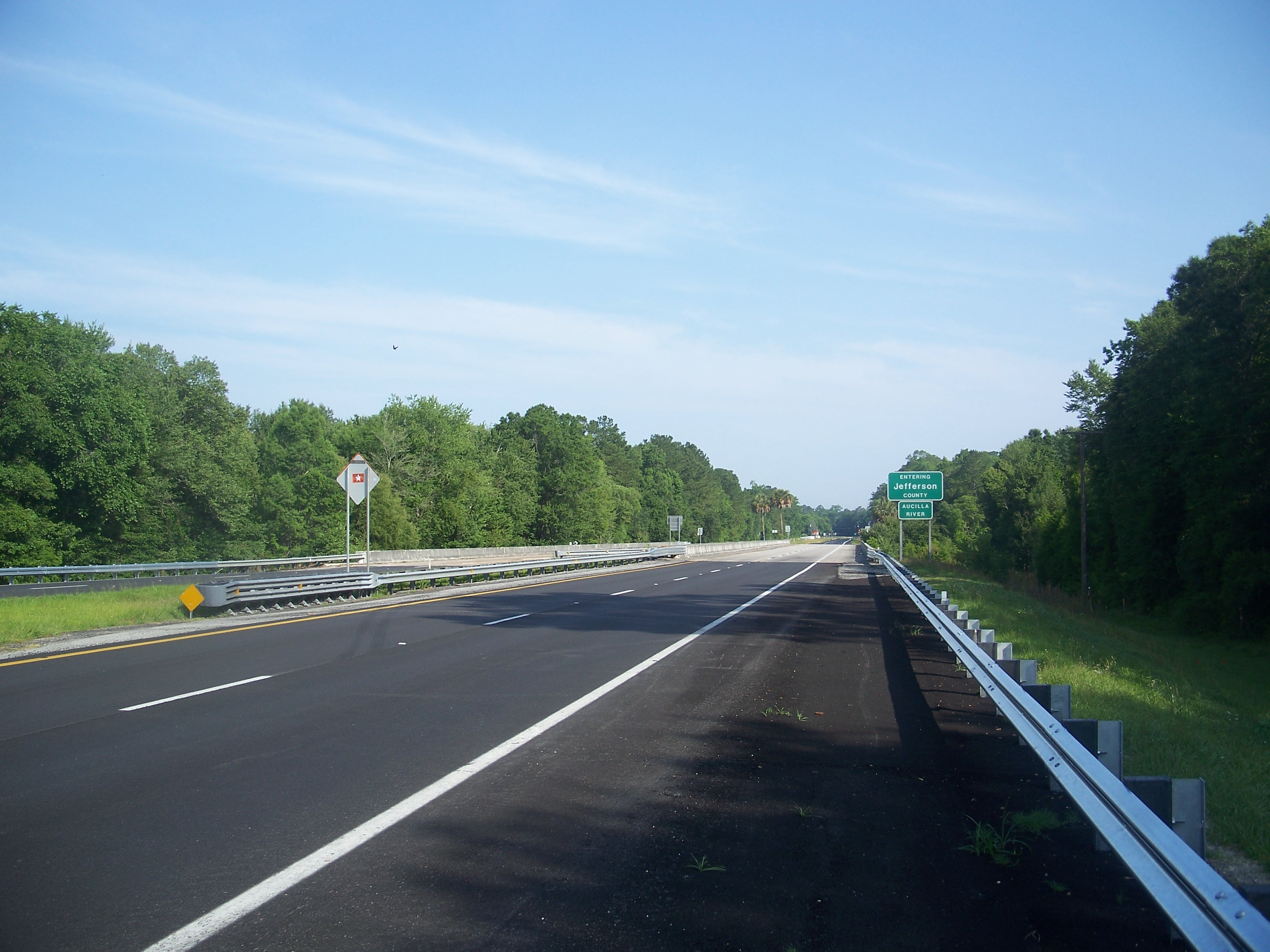
US 27 at the Aucilla River, which is the Madison–Jefferson county line

Swampland continues to surround US 27 until it comes close to Perry, where a small truck weigh station can be found along the westbound shoulder. The road divides momentarily at the intersection of SR 30, which has controlled turn lanes in the divider, but then turns back into an undivided two lane road as it curves northwest. At Buckeye Nursery Road, US 27 gets the name East Hampton Springs Avenue. The avenue curves from northwest to southwest once again and then straight west at Washington Street. The street name changes from East Hampton Springs Avenue to West Hampton Springs Avenue at US 221 (hidden SR 55) and also joins US 221 Truck. Several blocks later, the road intersects Byron Butler Parkway which is the northern terminus of the US 19/US 98/US 27 Alt. concurrency. Here, US 27 Alt. terminates, US 98 and SR 30 leave US 19 turning west onto West Hampton Springs Avenue, and US 27 joins US 19 becoming a four-lane highway again.

US 19/US 27 also continues to carry US 221 Truck until it reaches CR 359A (Wright Road) but also continues to take SR 20 with it heading straight northwest through the rest of Taylor County and then very briefly in Madison County, where it intersects CR 150. US 19 breaks away in Capps onto SR 57 on its way through Monticello, but not before resuming a westward direction at the Madison–Jefferson county line. In Tallahassee, the road becomes the 1957-built Apalachee Parkway, a major east–west thoroughfare. The parkway has a short expressway section just east of the capitol, then is a busy four-lane surface boulevard with service roads for the next few miles, passing Governor's Square, the Centre of Tallahassee, and many state office buildings. US 27 runs west along this stretch of road however, and the Apalachee Parkway ends at SR 61 (Monroe Street) in front of the Florida State Capitol building. US 27 and SR 20 make a sharp turn north along SR 61, but, at the intersection of US 90, SR 20 turns west while US 27 continues north along SR 61.

=== North from Tallahassee ===
State Road 63
- Location: Tallahassee–Georgia state line, near Hinson

After the intersection with US 90, hidden SR 63 officially begins at the intersection of North Monroe Street and Thomasville Road, where SR 61 resumes its status as a separate exposed route. After crossing Seventh Avenue, it begins to curve to the northwest avoiding Lake Ella. The first intersection during this curve is CR 158 (Tharpe Street) and is the beginning of SR 63's alternate street name of Old Quincy Highway.

SR 63 approaches its only suffixed auxiliary route in the form of CR 63A before encountering a partial cloverleaf interchange with I-10 (exit 199). North of the interchange, it begins to leave the Tallahassee city limits. A great deal of this segment of SR 63 consists of RV parks and other facilities serving tourists for Lake Jackson Mounds Archaeological State Park. It also serves as the northeast terminus of CR 356. After crossing a bridge that runs over a small portion of Lake Jackson, the road simultaneously intersects the northern terminus of SR 263 and southern terminus of CR 157 and CR 0361.

The road runs along the west side of Tallahassee Commercial Airport and makes a reverse curve as it approaches a bridge over the Ochlockonee River, where it crosses the Leon–Gadsden county line and continues to move northwest. After crossing another bridge, the first major intersection in the county is the eastern terminus of CR 270. Further north, CR 159 secretly joins US 27/SR 63 in a triple concurrency, and all three routes approach a CSX Transportation railroad line until they curve northeast before entering the town of Havana. CR 159 branches off on its own to the northwest before US 27/SR 63 curves straight north as it approaches the intersection with SR 12 and CR 12A. SR 12 joins the road in a brief concurrency before branching off to the east as CR 12, within the Havana town limits. The previously mentioned CSX Transportation railroad line runs more or less parallel to the road again. The road and the tracks curve back and forth near each other until the tracks take one final turn to the northwest in Hinson, and SR 63 begins to curve back to the northeast before the intersection with CR 159A. Shortly after this section, SR 63 curves further to the northeast as it approaches CR 12B. Finally in Darsey, SR 63 serves as the northern terminus of CR 157 and the southern terminus of an extension of State Route 111 (SR 111), before curving to the northwest again and finally terminating at the Florida–Georgia state line, where US 27 continues onto SR 1.

== History ==
Historical US 27 route markers

1934 design

1948 design

1956–1993, green highway shields

US 27 first entered Florida in 1934, terminating at Tallahassee. In 1948, it was extended to its current terminus in Miami.

The southern segment of the route connecting South Bay to Miami along the Florida Everglades, the Thomas E. Will Memorial Highway, was complete in the early 1940s. It was later redesignated at part of State Road 25 after the 1945 Florida state road renumbering.

When the US 27 designation was extended to Miami in 1948, large parts of SR 25, which would carry US 27 from Ocala to Miami, was not yet built between Leesburg and Sebring. As a result, US 27 was initially routed on a temporary alignment, signed as "Temporary US 27", along SR 33 from Leesburg to Polk City, then along various state roads through Lake Alfred, Winter Haven, and Alturas. It then ran along SR 60 from Alturas to Lake Wales, and SR 17 from Waverly to Avon Park to Frostproof and from Avon Park to Sebring. By 1952, US 27 was complete from Leesburg to Haines City, with SR 17 carrying the temporary route from Haines City to Sebring. The route of US 27 along SR 25 from Haines City to Sebring was fully complete by the late 1950s.

US 27 (along with US 301 and US 441) was realigned to bypass downtown Ocala in 1952 on an expanded Pine Avenue, which included an overpass over the railroad junction. US 27 previously entered Ocala from the south along SW 1st Avenue, then along SE 1st Avenue and Magnolia Avenue. It then ran west along SR 40 and reconnected with the current route via NW 30th Avenue.

Minor realignments were also made to US 27 in Glades County in the 1950s when newer bridges over the Caloosahatchee Canal in Moore Haven and Fisheating Creek in Palmdale were built.

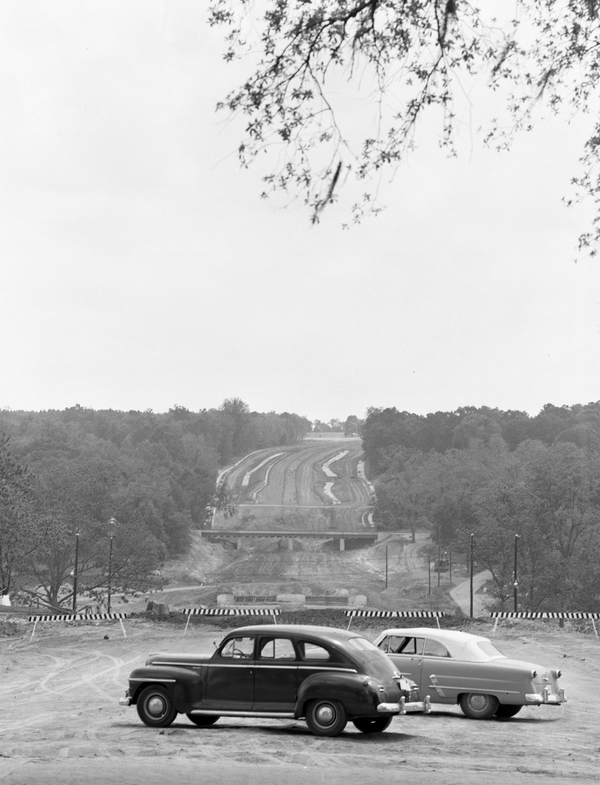
Construction of Apalachee Parkway in Tallahassee, April 1957

In 1957, the Apalachee Parkway was built as a major east–west thoroughfare in Tallahassee and designated as part of US 27 and SR 20. The parkway starts at SR 61 (Monroe Street) in front of the Florida State Capitol building. It has a short expressway section just east of the capitol then is a busy four-lane surface boulevard with service roads for the next few miles, eventually becoming Perry Highway. US 27 previously ran just to the south along Lafayette Avenue.

The current alignment of US 27 (and US 441) between Lady Lake and Belleview was built in 1960. The former alignment of US 27 and US 441 around Lake Weir was then designated as US 27/US 441 Alternate but it has since been relinquished to county control.

US 27 was realigned to its current four-lane route between South Bay and Clewiston along the Herbert Hoover Dike in the 1960s. The original alignment remains just to the south though it has been severed as a through route. The former alignment is known as "Old US Highway 27" and Corkscrew Boulevard.

From 1956 until 1993, US 27 signs in Florida featured white numbering on a green shield. The "color-coding" of U.S. Highways by the Florida Department of Transportation was stopped when the state could no longer use federal funds to replace the signs with anything but the standard black-and-white version; a few green US 27 signs remain.

Shortly after its second landfall, Hurricane Irma's eye traveled roughly along the entire course of US 27 in Florida north of Lake Placid.

In January 2021, Representative Anthony Sabatini announced he will sponsor an amendment to name the section of US 27 in Florida as the President Donald J. Trump Highway after former President Donald Trump.

== Major intersections ==
County	Location	mi	km	Destinations	Notes
Miami-Dade	Miami	0.000	0.000	US 1 (Biscayne Boulevard) to I-95 / I-195 – Miami Beach	I-195 exit 2B; southern end of SR 25 concurrency
Miami-Dade	Miami	1.138	1.831	US 441 (Northwest 7th Avenue)	
Miami-Dade	Miami	1.395	2.245	Northwest 10th Avenue to Express Lanes north	
Miami-Dade	Miami	1.651	2.657	SR 933 (Northwest 12th Avenue)	
Miami-Dade	Miami	2.660	4.281	To SR 112 / I-95 / Northwest 22nd Avenue	
Miami-Dade	Miami	3.171	5.103	SR 9 (Northwest 27th Avenue) to SR 112 / I-95 – Airport	
Miami-Dade	Hialeah	4.405	7.089	SR 948 west (Northwest 36th Street)	
Miami-Dade	Hialeah	4.43	7.13	SR 112 east to I-95 – Miami Beach	Southbound exit and northbound entrance
Miami-Dade	Hialeah	4.735	7.620	SR 953 (LeJeune Road) – Miami International Airport	
Miami-Dade	Hialeah	6.018	9.685	SR 944 east (Northwest 54th Street / Hialeah Drive) / Curtiss Parkway	
Miami-Dade	Hialeah	6.785	10.919	SR 823 north (Red Road / West 4th Avenue)	No access from US 27 south
Miami-Dade	Hialeah–Hialeah Gardens line	9.43	15.18	SR 826 – Airport	Interchange
Miami-Dade	Hialeah Gardens	10.844	17.452	SR 932 east (Northwest 103rd Street)	
Miami-Dade	Hialeah Gardens	12.159	19.568	To I-75 / Hialeah Gardens Boulevard / Northwest 116th Way	Interchange
Miami-Dade	Hialeah Gardens	14.489	23.318	Florida's Turnpike Extension – Orlando, Homestead	Turnpike exit 35
Miami-Dade		19.247	30.975	SR 997 south (Krome Avenue) – Homestead, Key West	Former SR 27 south
Broward	Pembroke Pines	23.218	37.366	SR 820 east (Pines Boulevard) to I-75	
Broward	Pembroke Pines	24.720	39.783	To SR 822 / I-75 / Sheridan Street	
Broward	Southwest Ranches	26.776	43.092	To SR 818 / I-75 / Griffin Road – Everglades Holiday Park	
Broward	Weston	32.65	52.55	I-75 (Alligator Alley) to SR 84 east – Miami, Fort Lauderdale, Naples	I-75 exit 23
Palm Beach	Okeelanta	69.691	112.157	CR 827	
Palm Beach	South Bay	73.528	118.332	SR 80 east (Main Street / West Palm Beach Road) to US 441 / SR 715 – Belle Glade, West Palm Beach	Southern end of SR 80 concurrency
Hendry		87.203	140.340	CR 835 south (Evercane Road)	
Hendry	Clewiston	89.384	143.850	W.C. Owen Avenue (CR 832)	
Hendry		95.958	154.429	CR 720 west	
Hendry	Whidden Corner	98.377	158.322	SR 80 west – LaBelle, Ft. Myers, Big Cypress Seminole Reservation	Northern end of SR 80 concurrency
Glades		102.379	164.763	CR 720 east	
Glades		103.9	167.2	Daniels Road to River Road	Interchange
Glades	Moore Haven	104.2	167.7	3rd Street to North Frontage Road	Southbound exit and northbound entrance; interchange
Glades		106.129	170.798	SR 78 east – Lakeport, Seminole Reservation, Okeechobee	Southern end of SR 78 concurrency
Glades		110.110	177.205	SR 78 west – LaBelle	Northern end of SR 78 concurrency
Glades	Harrisburg	120.599	194.085	SR 29 south – LaBelle, Immokalee	
Glades		121.677	195.820	CR 733 north (3rd Street)	
Glades	Palmdale	122.055	196.428	Broadway Street (CR 733 south)	
Glades		127.979	205.962	CR 17 north (Detjens Dairy Road)	
Highlands		130.749	210.420	CR 731 south – Venus	
Highlands	Bairs Den	140.536	226.171	SR 70 – Arcadia, Okeechobee	
Highlands		144.825	233.073	CR 29 south	
Highlands		144.946	233.268	Old State Road 8	
Highlands	Lake Placid	146.283	235.420	CR 17 north (South Main Avenue)	
Highlands	Lake Placid	147.043	236.643	CR 17A west (Interlake Boulevard) / CR 621 east – Downtown	
Highlands		148.589	239.131	CR 17 south / CR 621 west (Lake June Road) – Lake June in Winter Scrub State Park	
Highlands		150.296	241.878	CR 17 north	
Highlands		157.342	253.217	US 98 south / SR 66 west – Airport, Zolfo Springs, Sebring International Raceway, Okeechobee, Spring Lake	Southern end of US 98 concurrency
Highlands	Sebring	160.097	257.651	CR 17A north (Highlands Avenue) – Fairground, Amtrak, truck route to SR 17	
Highlands	Sebring	160.847	258.858	SR 17 north – Sebring Historic District	
Highlands	Sebring	162.830	262.049	CR 634 west – Highlands Hammock State Park	
Highlands	Sebring	163.596	263.282	CR 634 Alt. west (Flare Road / CR 634 east)	
Highlands	Sebring	165.816	266.855	Sebring Parkway (CR 634A east) - Sebring	
Highlands	Avon Park	171.572	276.118	SR 17 south / SR 64 west (Main Street) – Wauchula, Zolfo Springs, Avon Park Air Force Range, Historical District, Airport	
Highlands	Avon Park	173.074	278.536	CR 17A south / Stryker Road – Avon Park Lakes, truck route to SR 17 / CR 64	
Polk		177.968	286.412	SR 17 north (Scenic Highway) / North Avon Park Cut-Off – Frostproof	
Polk		182.234	293.277	US 98 north / CR 630 east – Ft. Meade, Frostproof, Indian Lake Estates	Northern end of US 98 concurrency
Polk		183.995	296.111	CR 630A east – Frostproof, Indian Lake Estates	
Polk		190.269	306.208	CR 640 east / Alta / Bab Cut-Off Road – Babson Park, Webber International University	
Polk	Lake Wales	192.372	309.593	CR 17B east (Hunt Brothers Road)	
Polk	Lake Wales	194.20	312.53	SR 60 – Vero Beach, Tampa, Lake Kissimmee State Park	Interchange; access to Lake Wales Medical Center
Polk	Lake Wales	196.100	315.592	Mountain Lake Cut Off Road North - Bok Tower Gardens	
Polk	Lake Wales	198.530	319.503	CR 17A east (Chalet Suzanne Road) / Thompson Nursery Road – Historic Chalet Suzanne	
Polk	Winter Haven	200.143	322.099	SR 540 west (Cypress Gardens Boulevard) / Waverly Road – Legoland, Winter Haven, Waverly	
Polk	Dundee	202.883	326.509	SR 542 west (Dundee Road) – Winter Haven, Dundee	
Polk	Lake Hamilton	205.476	330.682	CR 546 east (Kokomo Road)	
Polk	Winter Haven	207.432	333.829	SR 544 – Winter Haven, Auburndale, Grenelefe	
Polk	Haines City	209.28	336.80	US 17 / US 92 to SR 17 – Haines City, Lake Alfred	Interchange
Polk	Haines City	210.327	338.488	CR 17 (Old Polk City Road / Main Street) – Business District	
Polk	Haines City	212.866	342.575	CR 547 east / Sanders Road – Davenport	
Polk	Four Corners	218.15	351.08	I-4 – Orlando, Tampa, St. Petersburg	I-4 exit 55
Polk	Four Corners	219.750	353.653	Deen Still Road / Ronald Reagan Parkway (CR 54 east) - Loughman	
Lake	Four Corners	226.19	364.02	US 192 east / SR 530 east – Disney World, Kissimmee	Interchange
Lake	Four Corners	227.892	366.757	CR 474 west	
Lake		232.477	374.135	SR 516 east (Lake-Orange Expressway)	
Lake	Clermont	240.96	387.79	SR 50 – Clermont, Orlando	Interchange; access to South Lake Hospital
Lake	Minneola	242.972	391.026	CR Old 50 east (Washington Street)	
Lake	Minneola	243.536	391.933	Main Avenue	Former CR 561 south
Lake	Minneola	244.029	392.727	CR 561 south (Lake Minneola Shores)	Southern end of CR 561 concurrency; former CR 561A south
Lake		246.165	396.164	CR 561 north – Astatula	Northern end of CR 561 concurrency
Lake	Groveland	249.52	401.56	SR 19 – Howey-in-the-Hills, Tavares, Groveland	Interchange
Lake	Groveland	249.689	401.835	Florida's Turnpike south (SR 91) – Miami	Turnpike exit 285
Lake		252.209	405.891	CR 565 south	
Lake		253.551	408.051	Florida's Turnpike north (SR 91) – Ocala	Turnpike exit 289
Lake	Leesburg	258.824	416.537	CR 48 to Florida's Turnpike north – Okahumpka, Howey-in-the-Hills	
Lake		259.879	418.235	CR 33 south – Mascotte, Dade Battlefield Historic State Park	
Lake	Leesburg	260.907	419.889	CR 25A north (Connell Road) – Flat Island Preserve	
Lake	Leesburg	262.107	421.820	CR 25A south – Flat Island Preserve	
Lake	Leesburg	262.741	422.841	SR 44 (Dixie Avenue / South Street) to I-75 / US 441 south – Wildwood, Eustis	
Lake	Leesburg	264.329	425.396	US 441 south – Orlando	south end of US 441/SR 500 concurrency
see US 441 (mile 289.300-320.451)
Marion	Ocala	295.480	475.529	US 301 north / US 441 north (North Pine Avenue) / SR 492 east (Bonnie Heath Boulevard) to SR 40 – Gainesville, Silver Springs	Northern end of US 301/US 441 concurrency
Marion	Ocala	298.29	480.05	I-75 – Lake City, Tampa	I-75 exit 354
Marion		301.680	485.507	CR 225A	
Marion		304.972	490.805	CR 225 north	
Marion	Fellowship	305.476	491.616	CR 464B west	
Marion	Blitchton	309.361	497.868	CR 326 – Morriston, Zuber	
Marion		316.027	508.596	CR 316 east	
Levy		316.203	508.879	CR 335 north	
Levy		317.248	510.561	CR 316 (Northeast 30th Street)	
Levy		318.555	512.665	CR 318 east	
Levy	Williston	318.965	513.324	CR 323 south (Southeast 8th Street)	
Levy	Williston	319.602	514.350	US 27 Alt. north / US 41 south / SR 121 south (Noble Avenue) – Dunnellon, Tallahassee	Northern end of SR 500 concurrency; southern end of US 41/SR 121concurrency
see US 41 (mile 375.158-408.641)
Alachua	High Springs	353.085	568.235	SR 20 south (Northeast 1st Avenue) / US 41 north (North Main Street) – Alachua, Lake City	Northern end of US 41concurrency; southern end of SR 20 concurrency
Santa Fe River				Bridge over the Santa Fe River	
Columbia		356.377	573.533	CR 138 west	
Columbia		359.182	578.047	CR 778 east	
Columbia	Fort White	362.729	583.756	CR 18 east – Worthington Springs	
Columbia	Fort White	362.999	584.190	SR 47 (1st Street) – Trenton, Ichetucknee Springs, Lake City	
Ichetucknee River				Bridge over the Ichetucknee River	
Suwannee	Hildreth	369.456	594.582	CR 137 north	
Suwannee		372.470	599.432	US 129 south / CR 49 north – Bell, Live Oak	Southern end of US 129 concurrency
Suwannee	Branford	376.544	605.989	US 129 north (Southwest Suwannee Avenue) – Live Oak, Jasper	Northern end of US 129 concurrency
Suwannee River				Frank R. Norris Bridge	
Lafayette		377.889	608.153	SR 349 south – Old Town	
Lafayette		380.720	612.709	CR 405	Former SR 354
Lafayette		384.766	619.221	CR 416	Former SR 354A
Lafayette		385.435	620.298	CR 411	Former SR 251
Lafayette		385.561	620.500	CR 412	Former SR 251
Lafayette		386.785	622.470	CR 412	Former SR 251
Lafayette		389.321	626.551	CR 354 west / CR 405 – Convict Spring	Former SR 354
Lafayette	Mayo	394.061	634.180	SR 51 (Fletcher Avenue) – Steinhatchee, Live Oak	
Lafayette	Mayo	394.382	634.696	CR 300	Former SR 251A
Lafayette		395.457	636.426	CR 320	Former SR 251
Lafayette		397.779	640.163	CR 534 / CR 536	Former SR 53
Lafayette		398.874	641.925	CR 292 – Lafayette Blue Springs State Park	Former SR 251B
Lafayette		400.632	644.755	CR 251 north / CR 350 south	Former SR 251/SR 350
Lafayette	Buckville	403.058	648.659	CR 53 north / CR 534 – Day, Dowling Park, Madison	Former SR 53
Lafayette	Townsend	405.873	653.189	CR 348 east	Former SR 348
Taylor		416.660	670.549	Fenholloway Road	Former SR 356
Taylor		416.864	670.878	San Pedro Road	Former SR 356
Taylor		417.613	672.083	CR 30 west (Foley Road) – Foley	
Taylor		418.838	674.054	Foley Cut Off	Former SR 356C
Taylor		420.331	676.457	Buckeye Nursery Road	Former SR 361 north
Taylor		420.457	676.660	Plantation Road	Former SR 361 south
Taylor	Perry	421.925	679.022	US 221 (Jefferson Street)	
Taylor	Perry	422.350	679.706	US 19 south / US 27 Alt. south / US 98 / US 221 Truck south (Byron Butler Parkway / Hampton Springs Avenue) – Cross City, St. Petersburg	Southern end of US 19/US 221 Truck concurrency
Taylor	Perry	423.309	681.250	CR 356 (West Julia Street)	Former SR 356 west
Taylor	Perry	423.615	681.742	West Ash Street	Former SR 356 east
Taylor		424.399	683.004	Andrew Reams Road	Former SR 356B; southbound access only
Taylor		425.144	684.203	US 221 Truck north / CR 359A (Wright Road / Slaughter Road)	Northern end of US 221 Truck concurrency
Taylor		426.672	686.662	CR 361 (Pisgah Road / Harrison Blue Road)	
Taylor	Eridu	438.588	705.839	CR 14 east (Alton Wentworth Road)	
Madison		440.159	708.367	CR 150 east (Southwest Overstreet Avenue)	
Aucilla River				Bridge over the Aucilla River	
Jefferson	Lamont	445.162	716.419	CR 257A south (South Salt Road)	
Jefferson	Lamont	445.244	716.551	CR 257B north to I-10 – Aucilla	
Jefferson	Capps	451.558	726.712	US 19 north (Florida Georgia Parkway) to I-10 – Monticello	Northern end of US 19 concurrency
Jefferson	Waukeenah	454.072	730.758	CR 259 (Waukeenah Highway) – Wacissa	
Jefferson		458.141	737.306	SR 59 to I-10 – Wacissa, Lloyd	
Leon	Chaires Crossroads	464.329	747.265	CR 154 (Chaires Cross Road) / CR 2195 (W.W. Kelley Road) – Chaires, Capitola, Wakulla Correctional Institution	
Leon		466.679	751.047	CR 2197 south (Williams Road)	
Leon	Tallahassee	470.916	757.866	US 319 (Capital Circle Southeast) – National Guard Armory, Federal Correctional Institution, Tallahassee International Airport	
Leon	Tallahassee	472.342	760.161	CR 373 south (Blair Stone Road)	
Leon	Tallahassee	472.86	760.99	Old St. Augustine Road (CR 2196)	Eastbound access only
Leon	Tallahassee	473.144	761.451	SR 265 north / CR 265 south (Magnolia Drive)	
Leon	Tallahassee	474.1	763.0	Franklin Boulevard (CR 1555), Thomasville Road (SR 61 north) via Gadsden Street (CR 1557 north)	Northbound exit and southbound entrance; interchange
Leon	Tallahassee	474.222	763.186	CR 1559 south (Calhoun Street)	
Leon	Tallahassee	474.287	763.291	SR 61 south (Monroe Street)	Southern end of SR 61 concurrency
Leon	Tallahassee	474.388	763.453	SR 366 west (Jefferson Street)	
Leon	Tallahassee	474.740	764.020	US 90 (Tennessee Street) / SR 20 west – Florida State University, Quincy, Monticello	Northern end of SR 20 concurrency
Leon	Tallahassee	475.126	764.641	SR 61 north (Thomasville Road) – Thomasville	Northern end of SR 61 concurrency; southern end of SR 63; no left turn southbound
Leon	Tallahassee	476.073	766.165	CR 158 west (Tharpe Street)	
Leon	Tallahassee	478.17	769.54	I-10 – Lake City, Pensacola	I-10 exit 199
Leon	Tallahassee	480.070	772.598	CR 0356 west (Fred George Road) / Crowder Road – Lake Jackson Mounds Archaeological State Park	
Leon	Lake Jackson	482.951	777.234	SR 263 south / CR 0361 (Capital Circle Northwest / Old Bainbridge Road) – Tallahassee International Airport	
Ochlockonee River				Bridge over the Ochlockonee River	
Gadsden		486.065	782.246	CR 270 west (Shady Rest Road)	
Gadsden		488.750	786.567	CR 159 south (Scotland Road)	
Gadsden	Havana	489.948	788.495	SR 159 north – Quincy	
Gadsden	Havana	490.787	789.845	SR 12 west / CR 12A east (9th Avenue) – Quincy	
Gadsden	Havana	491.039	790.251	CR 12 east (5th Avenue East)	
Gadsden	Hinson	492.840	793.149	CR 159A south (Potter Woodbery Road)	
Gadsden		493.391	794.036	CR 12B east (Glade Road)	
Gadsden	Darsey	496.216	798.582	CR 157 south (Concord-Bainbridge Road) to SR 111 / Darsey-Calvary Road – Calvary, GA	
Gadsden		496.352	798.801	US 27 north / SR 1 north – Attapulgus, Bainbridge	Georgia state line
1.000 mi = 1.609 km; 1.000 km = 0.621 mi: Concurrency terminus; Incomplete access; Unopened

== Related routes ==
At least five special routes of US 27 have existed in Florida, although only one exists today:

=== Current route ===
- U.S. Highway 27 Alternate – Williston to Perry

=== Former routes ===
- U.S. Highway 27 Alternate – Sebring to Avon Park
- U.S. Highway 27 Temporary – Sebring to Leesburg
- U.S. Highway 27 Alternate – Sunray Deli Estates (north of Avon Park) to Haines City
- U.S. Highway 27 Alternate – Lady Lake to Belleview; cosigned with the former US 441 Alt.

== See also ==
U.S. Route 27
Previous state: Terminus	Florida	Next state: Georgia
