= List of county roads in Lafayette County, Florida =

- County road shields used in Florida

Highway names
- Interstates: Interstate X (I-X)
- US Highways: U.S. Highway X (US X)
- State: State Road X (SR X)
- County: County Road X (CR X)

System links
- County roads in Florida; County roads in Lafayette County

The following is a list of county roads in Lafayette County, Florida. All county roads are maintained by the county in which they reside, although not all routes are marked with standard county road shields.

== County roads in Lafayette County ==
Route	Road Name(s)	From	To	Notes
CR 53		US 27 (SR 20) / CR 534 in Buckville	CR 53 at the Madison County line north-northeast of Day	Former SR 53
CR 138A		CR 490 north-northeast of Hatchbend	Riverside Drive north-northeast of Hatchbend	Unsigned
CR 250		CR 53 north-northeast of Day	CR 250 at the Suwannee County line north-northeast of Day	Former SR 250
CR 251		US 27 (SR 20) / CR 350 southeast of Buckville	CR 250 north-northeast of Day	Former SR 251
CR 260		CR 53 north-northeast of Day	CR 251 northeast of Day	Former SR 348C
CR 270		CR 53 / NW Maine Avenue in Day	CR 251 east of Day	Former SR 348B
CR 280		CR 53 / NW Gulfwind Avenue south of Day	CR 251 southeast of Day	
CR 290		CR 53 south of Day	CR 292 / Ezell Landing Road at Allen Mill Pond Conservation Area southeast of Day	Former SR 348A
CR 292		US 27 (SR 20) southeast of Buckville	CR 290 / Ezell Landing Road at Allen Mill Pond Conservation Area southeast of Day	Former SR 251B
CR 300		CR 534 northwest of Mayo	US 27 (SR 20) / NW Bloxham Street in Mayo	Unsigned except on street signs; former SR 251 (north of CR 320) and SR 251A (south of CR 320)
CR 320		CR 300 west-northwest of Mayo	US 27 (SR 20) northwest of Mayo	Former SR 251
CR 340		CR 355 south-southeast of Mayo	Shaw Road / Parker Avenue east-southeast of Mayo	former SR 251
CR 348		US 27 (SR 20) west of Buckville	CR 53 north-northeast of Buckville	Former SR 348
CR 350		CR 534 / SW Arlington Road south of Buckville	US 27 (SR 20) / CR 251 southeast of Buckville	Former SR 350
CR 351		CR 534 south-southeast of Buckville	CR 350 / SW Dickens Road southeast of Buckville	Former SR 350
CR 353		US 27 (SR 20) / W.R. Williams Road east of Alton	CR 354 north-northeast of Alton	
CR 354		SR 51 / Savannah Road north of Mayo	US 27 (SR 20) / CR 405 east of Alton	Former SR 354
CR 355	Pine Street	CR 360 south-southeast of Mayo	SR 51 / Pine Street in Mayo	Former SR 355
CR 357		CR 357 at the Dixie County line south-southeast of Cooks Hammock	SR 51 in Cooks Hammock	former SR 357
CR 360		SR 51 south-southwest of Mayo	CR 405 south of Midway	Former SR 355 (east of CR 355) and SR 355A (west of CR 355)
CR 361		US 27 (SR 20) / CR 371 east of Alton	CR 354 / NE Pecan Avenue northeast of Alton	
CR 371		SE Koon Lake Road southeast of Alton	US 27 (SR 20) / CR 361 east of Alton	
CR 400		SR 51 north of Mayo	US 27 (SR 20) east of Mayo	
CR 405		US 27 (SR 20) west-northwest of Grady	US 27 (SR 20) / CR 354 east of Alton	Former SR 354
CR 410		US 27 (SR 20) / Walter Henderson Road east-southeast of Alton	Owen Springs Boat Ramp on the Suwannee River east-southeast of Alton	Former SR 251 (east of CR 411)
CR 411		US 27 (SR 20) southeast of Alton	CR 410 east-southeast of Alton	Former SR 251
CR 412		US 27 (SR 20 southeast of Alton	US 27 (SR 20 east-southeast of Alton	Former SR 251
CR 416		CR 405 southeast of Alton	US 27 (SR 20) east-southeast of Alton	Former SR 354A
CR 420		CR 405 west-northwest of Grady	US 27 (SR 20) / Mandarin Road west-northwest of Grady	
CR 425		US 27 (SR 20) northwest of Grady	Orchid Road / Jeff Walker Road west-northwest of Grady	
CR 450		US 27 (SR 20)	Mandarin Road / Lavender Road / C-420	
CR 475		US 27 (SR 20) west-northwest of Grady	SR 349 west-southwest of Grady	
CR 480		SR 349	Boat Ramp along the Suwannee River	Former SR 138 (east of CR 500) and SR 342 (west of CR 500)
CR 500		SR 349 west of Hatchbend	CR 480 north-northwest of Hatchbend	Former SR 342
CR 534		US 27 (SR 20) / CR 53 in Buckville	US 27 (SR 20) / CR 536 northwest of Mayo	Former SR 53
CR 536		US 27 (SR 20) / CR 534 northwest of Mayo	SR 51 / NE Suwannee Acres Lane north of Mayo	Former SR 53
