= Florida State Road 53 =

Highway in Florida, US

State Road 53
- SR 53 highlighted in red and CR 53 in blue

Route information
- Maintained by FDOT
- Length: 19.170 mi (30.851 km)

Major junctions
- South end: I-10 / CR 53 near Madison
- US 90 in Madison
- North end: SR 333 towards Quitman, GA

Location
- Country: United States
- State: Florida
- Counties: Madison

Highway system
- Florida State Highway System; Interstate; US; State; Former; Pre‑1945; Toll; Scenic
← SR 52	→ SR 54

State Road 53 (SR 53) is a 19.170-mile-long (30.851 km) north–south state highway in the panhandle of northern Florida. Its southern terminus is an interchange with Interstate 10 (I-10; which also carries the unsigned designation of SR 8) near Lee and Madison; the northern terminus is at the Georgia state line near Cherry Lake, Florida. Part of SR 53, from Harvey Greene Drive north to SR 14, is also signed SR 14 Truck, a rare special state highway in Florida.

SR 53 continues northward from the state line as State Route 333 (SR 333). A southbound continuation of SR 53 is County Road 53, which ultimately ends at an intersection with U.S. Route 27 (US 27; which also carries the unsigned designation of SR 20) in Buckville (northwest of Mayo). This is also the western terminus of CR 534.

== Major intersections ==
County	Location	mi	km	Destinations	Notes
Lafayette	Buckville	0.000	0.000	US 27 (SR 20) / CR 534 – Mayo, Perry	
Lafayette		2.0	3.2	CR 290	former SR 348A east
Lafayette		2.3	3.7	CR 348 west	
Lafayette	Day	4.5	7.2	CR 270 (Northwest Maine Avenue)	former SR 348B east
Lafayette		5.8	9.3	CR 260	former SR 348C east
Lafayette		8.1	13.0	CR 250 east – Advent Christian Village	
Madison		9.4	15.1	CR 255 north	
Madison		19.515	31.406	south end of state maintenance	
Madison		19.84	31.93	I-10 (SR 8) – Tallahassee, Lake City	I-10 exit 258
Madison		24.817	39.939	SR 14 Truck west (Harvey Greene Drive)	south end of SR 14 Truck overlap
Madison	Madison	25.531	41.088	SR 14 west (Southwest Millinor Street)	north end of SR 14 Truck overlap
Madison	Madison	26.014	41.865	US 90 east (Base Street / SR 10) / SR 145 north (Duval Street) – Live Oak, North Florida Community College	south end of US 90 / SR 10 overlap
Madison	Madison	26.306	42.335	US 90 west (Base Street / SR 10) – Tallahassee, Greenville	north end of US 90 / SR 10 overlap
Madison		28.091	45.208	CR 146 west (Northwest Little Cat Road)	
Madison	Cherry Lake	34.3	55.2	CR 150	
Madison		36.186	58.236	CR 253 east (Northeast Cherry Lake Circle) – Camp Cherry Lake 4-H Center	
Madison		36.266	58.364	CR 253 west	
Madison		38.685	62.257	SR 333 north (Madison Highway) – Quitman	Georgia state line
1.000 mi = 1.609 km; 1.000 km = 0.621 mi: Concurrency terminus; Route transition
