= Hinson, Florida =

Unincorporated community in Florida, U.S.

Coordinates: 30°38′51″N 84°25′00″W

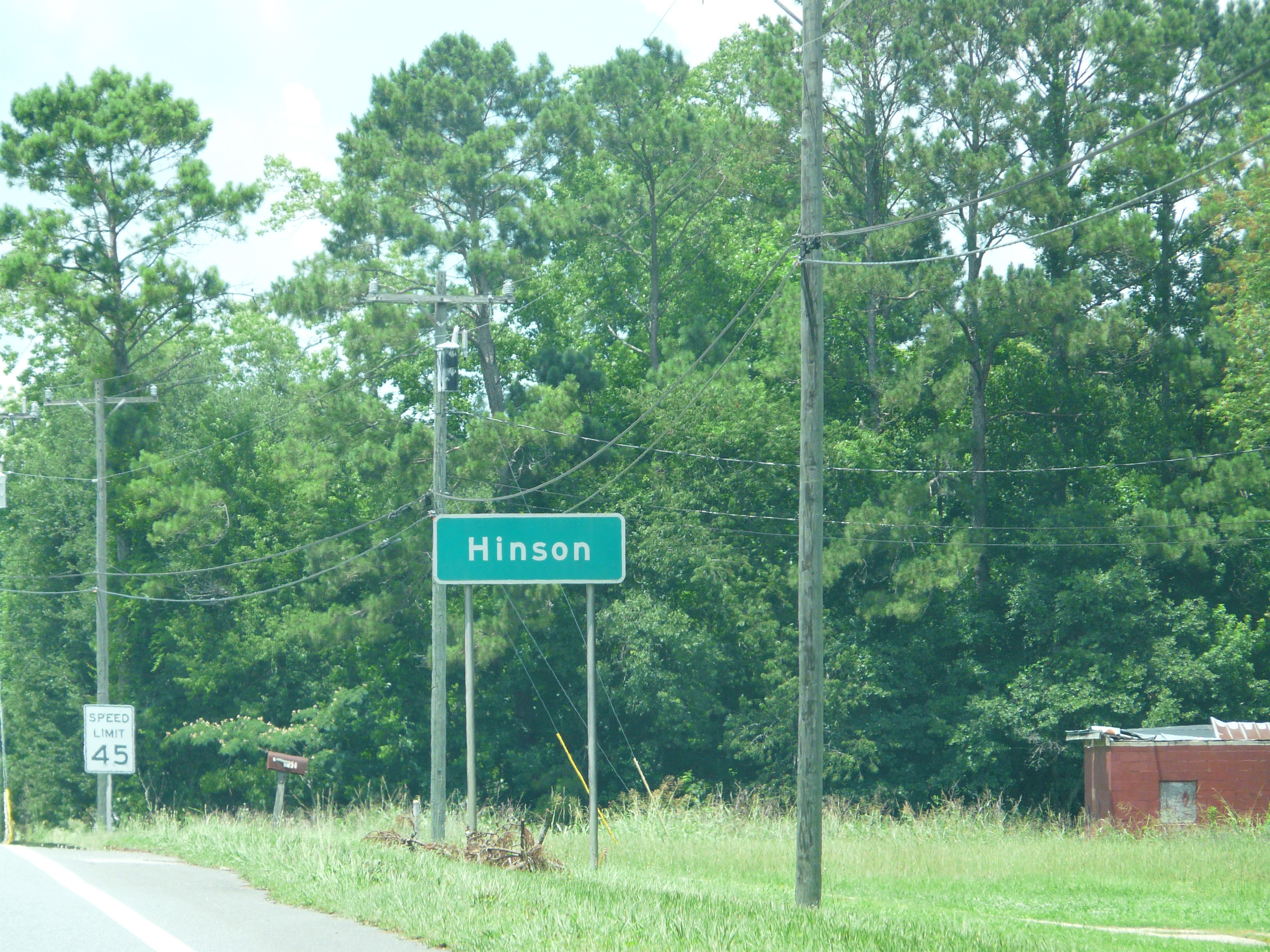
Sign for Hinson

Hinson is an unincorporated community in Gadsden County, Florida, United States. It is located along U.S. Route 27 in the vicinity of Potter-Woodbury Road north of Havana, Florida.
