= Florida State Road 145 =

State highway in Florida, United States

State Road 145
- Florida State Road 145 highlighted in red

Route information
- Maintained by FDOT

Main segment
- Length: 13.723 mi (22.085 km)
- South end: US 90 / SR 53 in Madison
- North end: SR 31 towards Valdosta, GA

Fort Walton Beach segment
- Length: 0.5 mi (800 m)
- South end: US 98 in Fort Walton Beach
- North end: SR 85 in Fort Walton Beach

Location
- Country: United States
- State: Florida
- Counties: Madison, Okaloosa

Highway system
- Florida State Highway System; Interstate; US; State; Former; Pre‑1945; Toll; Scenic
← SR 143	→ SR 152

State Road 145 (SR 145) runs north from US 90 and State Road 53 in Madison to the Georgia border, where it becomes State Route 31. It is also a short route in Fort Walton Beach between US 98 and State Road 85.

== Route description ==
=== Madison County ===
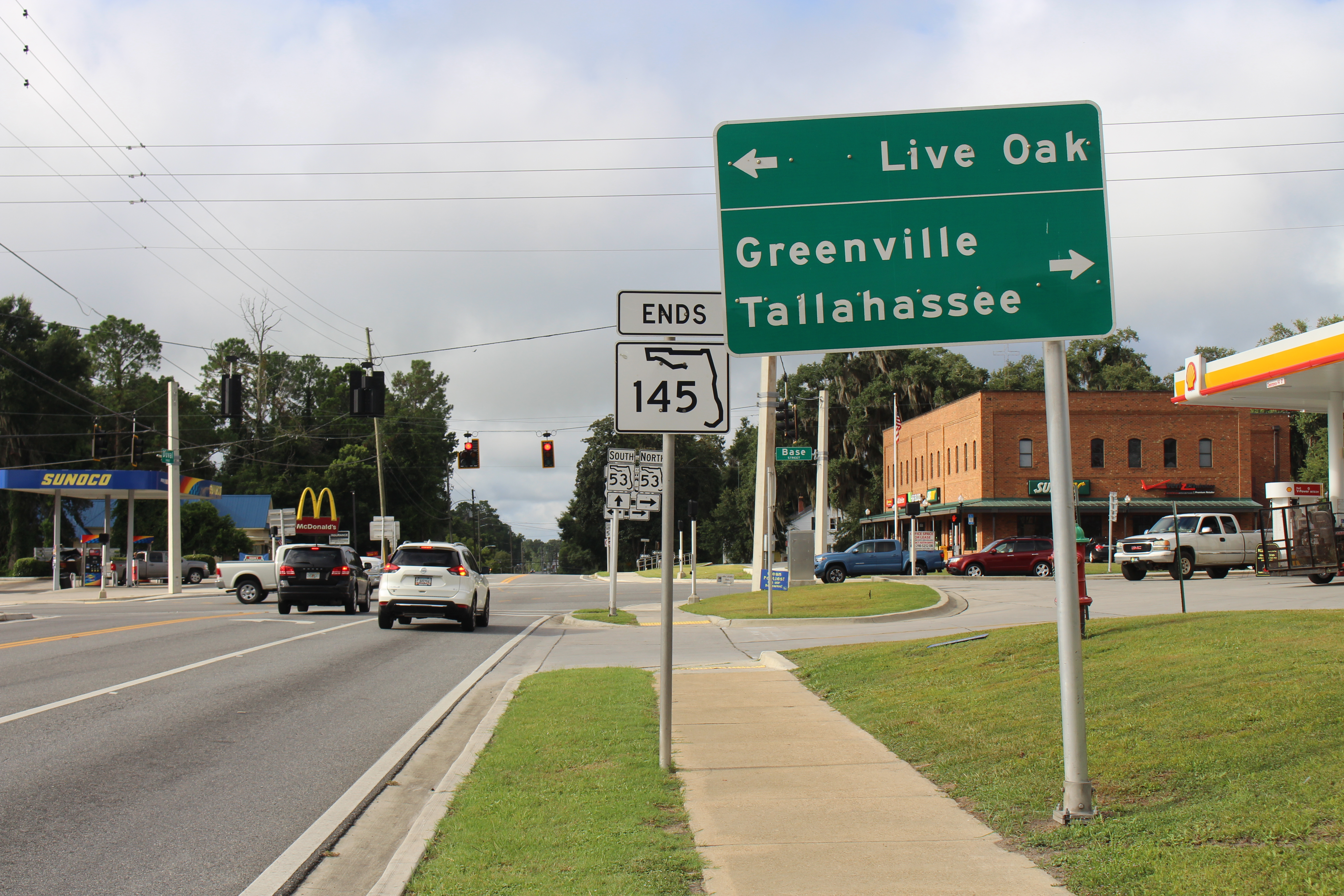
Southern terminus

State Road 145 begins in Madison at the southeastern terminus of the US 90/SR 53 overlap as Duval Street. It runs for four blocks until the intersection of East Livingston Street, where it makes a sharp turn to the right. After intersecting the southern terminus of County Road 591 (Rocky Ford Road), the Madison County Four Freedoms Trail begins along the southeast side of the road, which begins to curve toward the north and the street name is changed to Colin Kelly Highway. The surroundings along SR 145 north of Madison are typical of most state and county two-lane roads along the Florida Panhandle, consisting of random farms and forests with occasional embankments over wetlands. The road runs mostly northeast from the city, but straightens out briefly around the intersection of Rocky Springs Church Road. It curves back to the northeast after the intersection of two dirt roads named Northeast 113th and 115th Avenues. where the Four Freedoms Trail crosses from the east side to the west side. The closest resemblance to a major intersection at this point is with County Road 150, where a concurrency begins just before the road enters the unincorporated community of Pinetta. Within Pinetta, the trail moves away from SR 145/CR 150 just south of the intersection of Poppy Trail and runs along the parallel Northeast Persimmon Drive, while SR 145/CR 150 continues north through the town. The SR 145/CR 150 concurrency ends at Northeast Belleville Road where CR 150 turns east, and after this SR 145 curves even more toward the northeast than it was since leaving Madison. Eventually, that eastern trajectory begins to wane. As the road curves back toward the north, the last intersection in the state is with Northeast Oak Hill Road and the street name of SR 145 changes from Colin Kelly Highway to Madison Highway. State Road 145 ends at the Florida-Georgia State Line, becoming Georgia State Route 31 as it crosses a bridge over the Withlacoochee River.

=== Fort Walton Beach ===
The other State Road 145 can be found in Fort Walton Beach, and has no connection to the SR 145 in Madison County. Known locally as Perry Avenue Southeast, it has two northbound lanes and one southbound lane, although provisions for left turn lanes can be found in either direction. The route begins at US 98 east of the wye intersection with SR 85 and west of the John T. Brooks Bridge. It runs straight north and south until the intersection with Southeast Ferry Road Southeast which it joins running northeast. At the intersection of Chestnut Avenue Southeast, Perry Avenue breaks away from Ferry Road and joins that street until halfway between Third and Fourth Streets where it branches off to the northwest to terminate at State Road 85.

== Major intersections ==
The entire route is in Madison County.

Location	mi	km	Destinations	Notes
Madison	0.000	0.000	US 90 / SR 53 (Base Street / Duval Street / SR 10) to I-10 – Live Oak, Greenville	
Madison	0.218	0.351	East Livingston Street - Downtown Madison	
Madison	0.477	0.768	CR 591 north (Northeast Rocky Ford Road)	
	3.581	5.763	CR 254 east (Northeast Dusty Miller Avenue)	
	9.016	14.510	CR 150 west	
Pinetta	10.013	16.114	CR 150 east (Northeast Bellville Road)	
	13.723	22.085	SR 31 north – Valdosta	Georgia state line
1.000 mi = 1.609 km; 1.000 km = 0.621 mi
