= Griffin Road =

Highway in Broward County, Florida, US

Griffin Road
- State Road 818 and County Road 818
- SR 818 in red, CR 818 in blue

Route information
- Maintained by FDOT and Broward Public Works
- Length: 18.245 mi (29.362 km)

Major junctions
- West end: US 27 in Southwest Ranches
- I-75 in Davie; Florida's Turnpike in Davie; US 441 in Hollywood; I-95 in Dania Beach
- East end: US 1 near Dania Beach

Location
- Country: United States
- State: Florida
- County: Broward

Highway system
- Florida State Highway System; Interstate; US; State; Former; Pre‑1945; Toll; Scenic
← SR 817	→ SR 820

Griffin Road is a boulevard extending 18.2 miles (29.3 km) in Broward County, mostly designated State Road 818 (SR 818). It begins at Orange Drive (U.S. Route 27 or US 27) in Southwest Ranches and continues east to Federal Highway (US 1) in Dania Beach. The westernmost 7.5 miles (12.1 km) of Griffin Road are designated as County Road 818 (CR 818).

Griffin Road serves as a major commuter road for Cooper City, Davie, Hollywood, and Dania Beach in central Broward County, paralleling the South New River Canal for much of its route, and is a primary access road for Fort Lauderdale-Hollywood International Airport.

== Route description ==
=== CR 818 ===
Griffin Road originates as a locally maintained road, beginning in Everglades Holiday Park in the Everglades Wildlife Management Area adjacent to Weston. providing interchanges with US 27 and Interstate 75 (I-75 and SR 93) in Southwest Ranches

Despite the county designation, some state route shields seem to exist west of SR 823, likely because this segment of Griffin Road was formerly part of the state route. In September 2008, the most recent version of the online FDOT county highway map, State Road 818 formerly extended further west, terminating just west of the I-75 interchange. At the US 27 intersection, Griffin Road is signed as "TO SR 818."

=== SR 818 ===
State Road 818 begins at the Flamingo Road (SR 823) intersection, paralleling the South New River Canal and heading east into a residential suburban area, forming the border between Davie to the north and Cooper City to the south. At this point, Griffin Road fully enters Davie, and intersects with University Drive (SR 817) a half mile east of Pine Island Road. Griffin Road continues east through Davie, having an interchange with Florida's Turnpike (SR 91) before a curve dips slightly south and away from the paralleling canal. The road leaves Davie at the intersection with US 441/SR 7, entering a dense residential area of Hollywood. Griffin Road then enters Dania Beach, retaining the dense residential areas until the interchange with I-95. East of I-95, it forms the southern border of the Fort Lauderdale-Hollywood International Airport, with residential areas lining the road to the south as it approaches its eastern terminus at Federal Highway (US 1) at the southeastern end of the airport.

== Major intersections ==
The entire route is in Broward County.

Location	mi	km	Destinations	Notes
Southwest Ranches	0.0	0.0	US 27 – Everglades Holiday Park	
Southwest Ranches	5.0	8.0	I-75 – Miami, Naples	Exits 13A-B on I-75 (unsigned SR 93)
Cooper City	7.5 0.000	12.1 0.000	SR 823 (Flamingo Road) to I-595 – Flamingo Gardens	Transition from CR 818 to SR 818
Davie	3.817	6.143	SR 817 (University Drive) to I-595	
Davie	6.11	9.83	Florida's Turnpike – Orlando, Miami	Exit 53 on Turnpike (unsigned SR 91)
Davie–Hollywood line	6.663	10.723	US 441 / SR 7 to I-595	
Dania Beach	9.41	15.14	I-95 – West Palm Beach, Miami	Exit 23 on I-95 (unsigned SR 9)
Dania Beach	9.587	15.429	Old Griffin Road	Grade-separated interchange
	10.745	17.292	US 1 / NE 10th Street east – Fort Lauderdale-Hollywood International Airport	Road is unsigned SR 5
1.000 mi = 1.609 km; 1.000 km = 0.621 mi: Electronic toll collection; Route transition
