= Hildreth, Florida =

- Unincorporated community
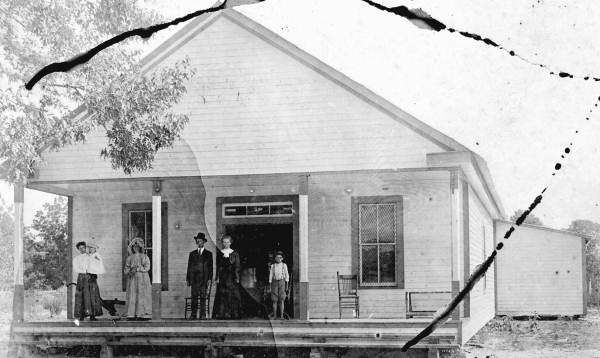
- Post office and store, 1920s

- Location within Florida
- Coordinates: 29°57′10″N 82°48′19″W
- Country: United States
- State: Florida
- County: Suwannee
- Elevation: 49 ft (15 m)
- Time zone: UTC-5 (Eastern (EST))
  - Summer (DST): UTC-4 (EDT)
- ZIP code: 32008
- Area code: 386
- GNIS feature ID: 294805

Hildreth is an unincorporated community in Suwannee County, Florida, United States. Hildreth is located on U.S. Route 27, 8 miles (13 km) east of Branford near Ichetucknee Springs State Park.
