= Everglades Holiday Park =

- Logo of Everglades Holiday Park, an Everglades airboat tour attraction

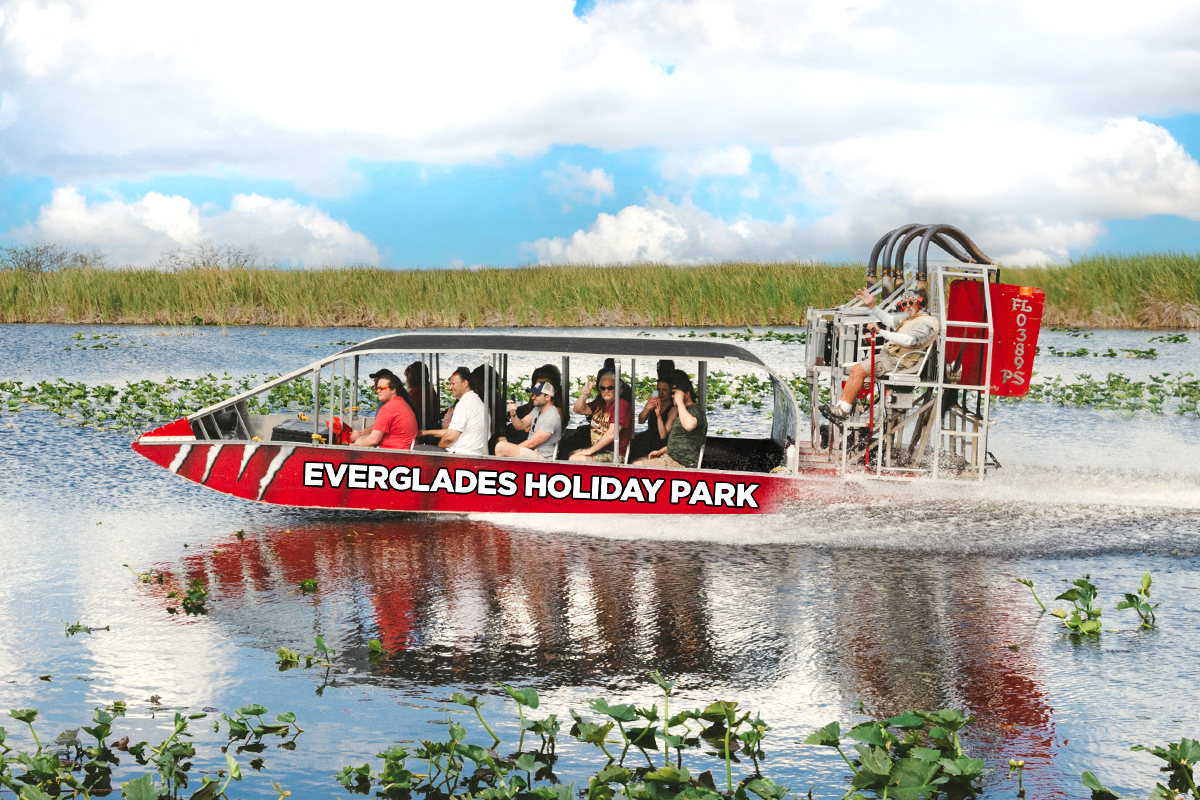
- Everglades Holiday Park airboat on a speed trail in the Everglades

[[Fort Lauderdale, Florida, United States]]
- Coordinates: 26.0604°N 80.4447°W
- Status: Operating
- Opening date: 1982

Ride statistics
- Attraction type: Airboat tours in the Everglades
- Website: www.evergladesholidaypark.com

Replacement history text:

Everglades Holiday Park opened on January 23, 1966, as a Game and Fresh Water Fish Commission concession on the edge of Water Conservation Area 3. The Miami News reported on April 1, 1965, that George McLean was the apparent high bidder for a recreation facility on the Route 27 canal near Hollywood. A dedication advertisement named Attorney General Earl Faircloth as speaker and placed the park on U.S. 27, three miles north of Hollywood Boulevard. Vic Dunaway reported on January 25, 1966, that the park had opened the previous Sunday under a long-term lease to George MacLean of North Miami Beach, at Pumping Station 9 near the site of Verne King’s earlier fishing camp. The column’s map labels the site Holiday Park Camp, beside Sawgrass Camp and Loxahatchee Camp. MacLean’s 2010 Miami Herald obituary lists Everglades Holiday Park among the venues he built and operated.

The land had been deeded by Davie Farm Lands, Inc. to Broward County in 1964 for public recreation, and the county leased it to the commission in 1965. Linda and Mitchell Bridges began managing the existing fishing camp in 1982. Bridges Enterprises, Inc. was assigned the concession on August 7, 1984. The commission returned the park to Broward County in June 2012.

Other editors may ask for a library copy of the 1965 and 1966 clippings, because a family PDF is harder to check than NewsBank or Newspapers.com. If you can find those articles there, add those links. The obituary, the December 30, 1990 Sun-Sentinel feature, and the Broward concession memorandum are already online and should be cited with them.

Replace the unsourced info of the start date 1982 with the actual dedication date of January 23, 1966 and name the original concessionaire as George J. MacLean. 1982 date was Mitch Bridges subsequent concessionaire.

Everglades Holiday Park offers everglades airboat tours situated on 29 acres of wetlands in the Everglades in Fort Lauderdale, Florida. The park is located on the western end of Griffin Road, off U.S. 27 in Fort Lauderdale, Florida. Everglades Holiday Park is not affiliated with Everglades National Park.

== History ==
George M. Bridges was a tobacco farmer with a background in construction. In 1982, he decided to pursue a new career and built his own airboat in the backyard. Mortgaging his house, Bridges invested all his money and time into building more airboats and starting an educational and recreational park ground. Bridges began offering narrated airboat tours through the Everglades and by June 1982, Everglades Holiday Park was officially operating. The park is family run, with George's son, Clint, overseeing the day-to-day operations.

The land now occupied by Everglades Holiday Park was originally owned by domestic profit corporation Davie Farm Lands, Inc and deeded to Broward County in 1964. The deed stipulated that the land's sole use be for "public recreation purposes." Broward County entered into a long-term lease agreement with the Florida Fish and Wildlife Conservation Commission (FWC) in 1965. The property was then subleased until June 2012 when the FWC returned the park to Broward County. It has since operated through the county's Parks and Recreation Division.

== Attractions ==
=== Everglades Airboat Tours ===
Everglades Holiday Park has been offering airboat tours and rides in the Miami/Fort Lauderdale area since 1982. An airboat tour from this company typically consists of a 60 minute guided experience, during which a captain can point out alligators and other wildlife in the Everglades. Airboat rides can reach speeds of up to 35-45 miles per hour.

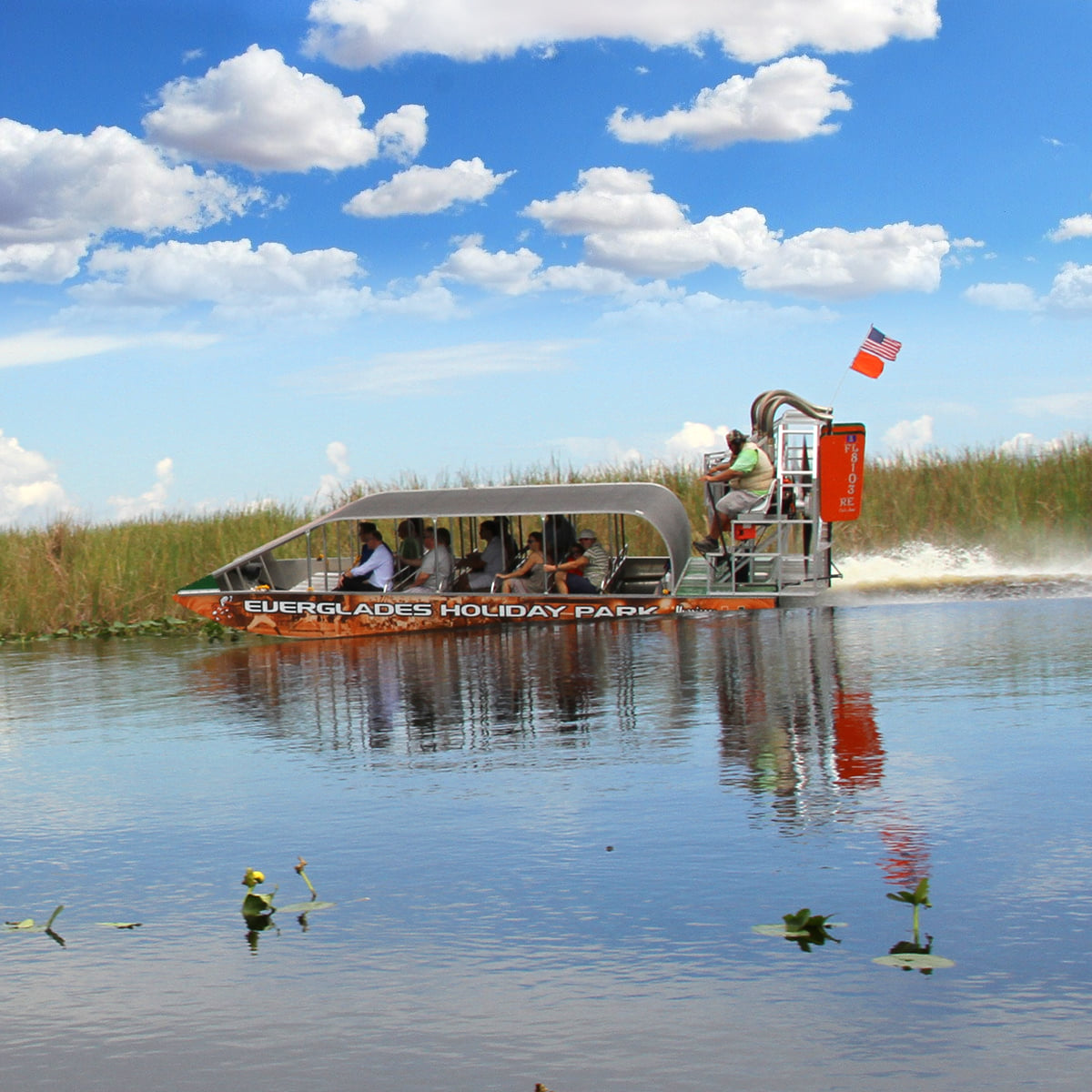
An airboat tour in Everglades Holiday Park

=== Gator Boys Alligator Rescue ===
Everglades Holiday Park is the home of the Gator Boys Alligator Rescue and educates the public about the ongoing conservation and preservation efforts in the Everglades. The team of gator trappers capture and rescue nuisance alligators from residential areas surrounding the Everglades and release them at the park. The park provides a protected habitat for gators which could otherwise be killed for their skin or meat. The rescue members were part of a TV show on Animal Planet called Gator Boys and filmed many of their episodes at the park.

== Renovations ==
In March 2022, Everglades Holiday Park unveiled the results of a major renovation project worth nearly $16 million. Many public areas were redesigned to help prevent chronic flooding. The project also included the addition of new restrooms, picnic areas, and public boat ramps.
