= Cherry Lake, Florida =

- Unincorporated community
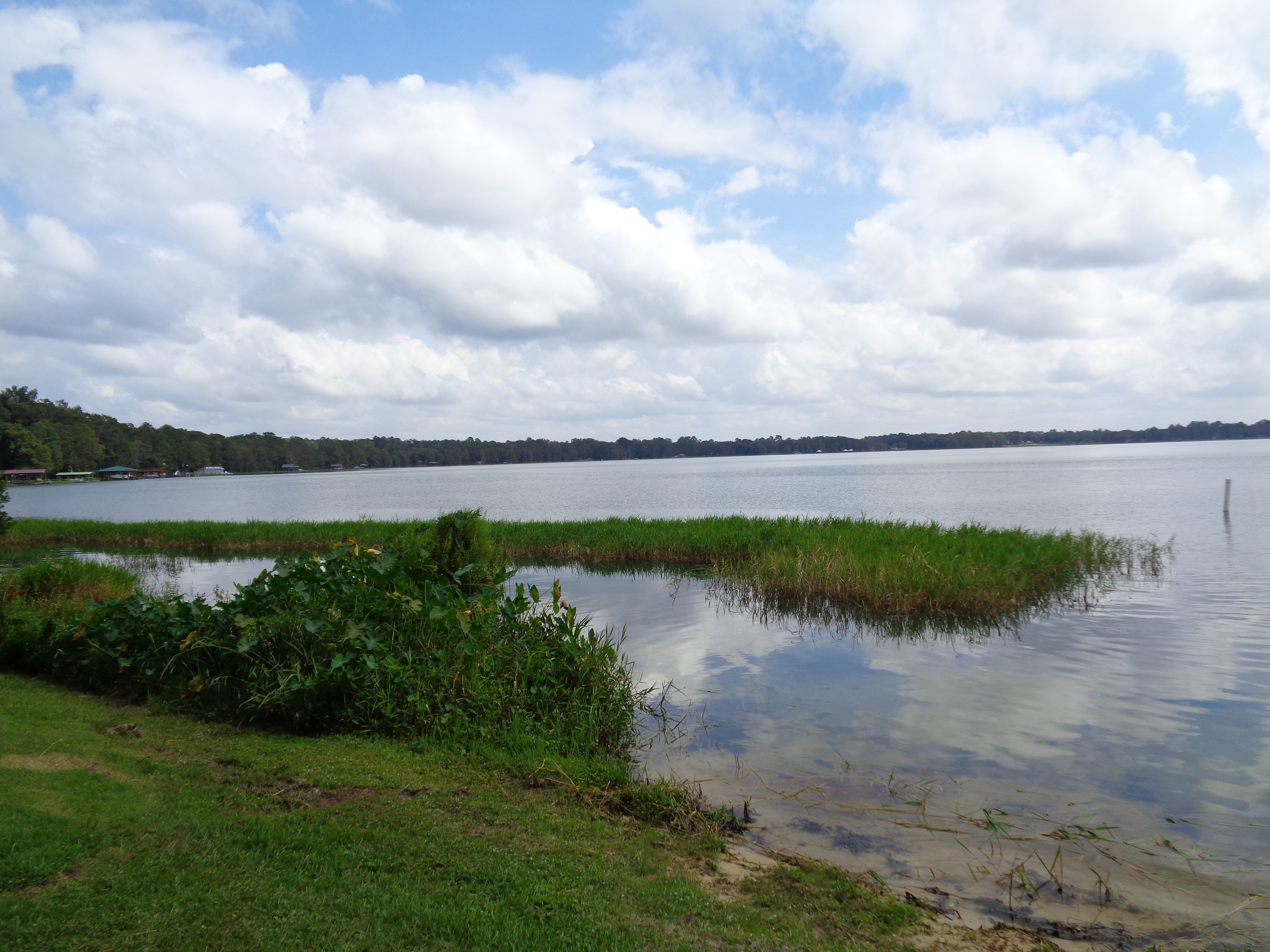
- Cherry Lake

- Location within Florida Location within the United States
- Country: United States
- State: Florida
- County: Madison
- ZIP code: 32340

Cherry Lake is an unincorporated community in Madison County, Florida, United States.

== History ==
The area was originally known by the indigenous Americans as Ocklawaha, and was first settled in the early 1830s, when Lucius A. Church purchased 2,000 acres (809 ha) for a plantation. The name of the area was formally changed to Cherry Lake in 1837, reflecting the name of the body of water it borders. The lake covers 405 acres (164 ha) and its name is derived from the native cherry trees that can be found along the lake's edge.

In the early 1930s the Federal Resettlement Administration, established as part of President Franklin D. Roosevelt's 'New Deal' program, acquired 12,420 acres (5,026 ha) of land at Cherry Lake to house families relocated from Tampa, Miami and Jacksonville. The settlement was originally called the Cherry Lake Rehabilitation Project, which was later changed to Cherry Lake Farm. This name was adopted by the local post office in December 1935. Only 132 of the planned 500 homesteads were built, each on a 10 acres (4 ha) plot of land. Residents attempted, unsuccessfully, to cultivate sugar cane and grapes, whilst others manufactured furniture. With the advent of World War II federal government support for the settlement was withdrawn and the majority of residents returned to their former homes or elsewhere.

In 1937 4-H youth organization purchased 12 acres (5 ha) of land adjacent to the lake and established a camp there.

== Geography ==
Cherry Lake is at Latitude 30°37'06", Longitude 83°25'20".

== Gallery ==
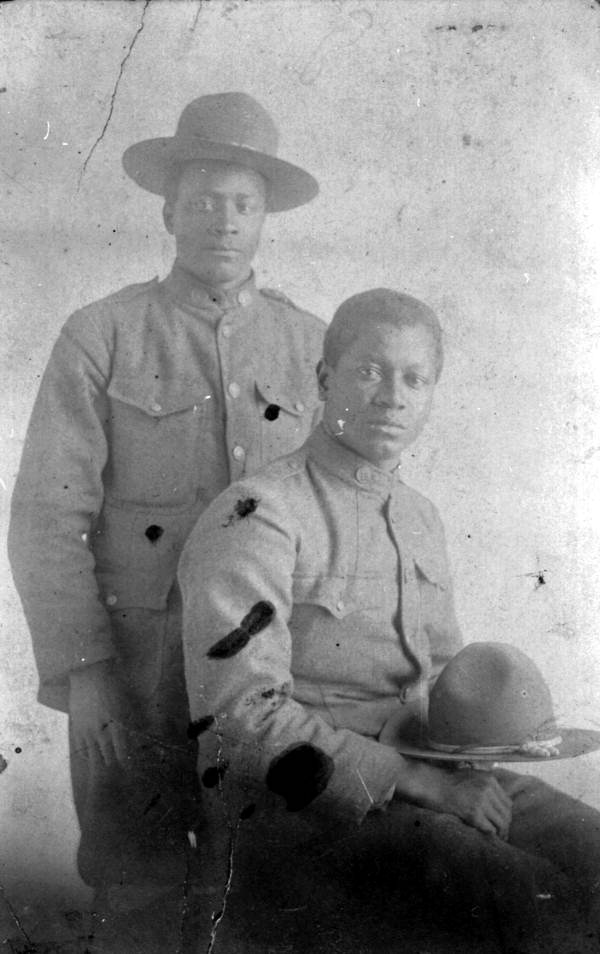
Augustus Aikens and friend in Cherry Lake

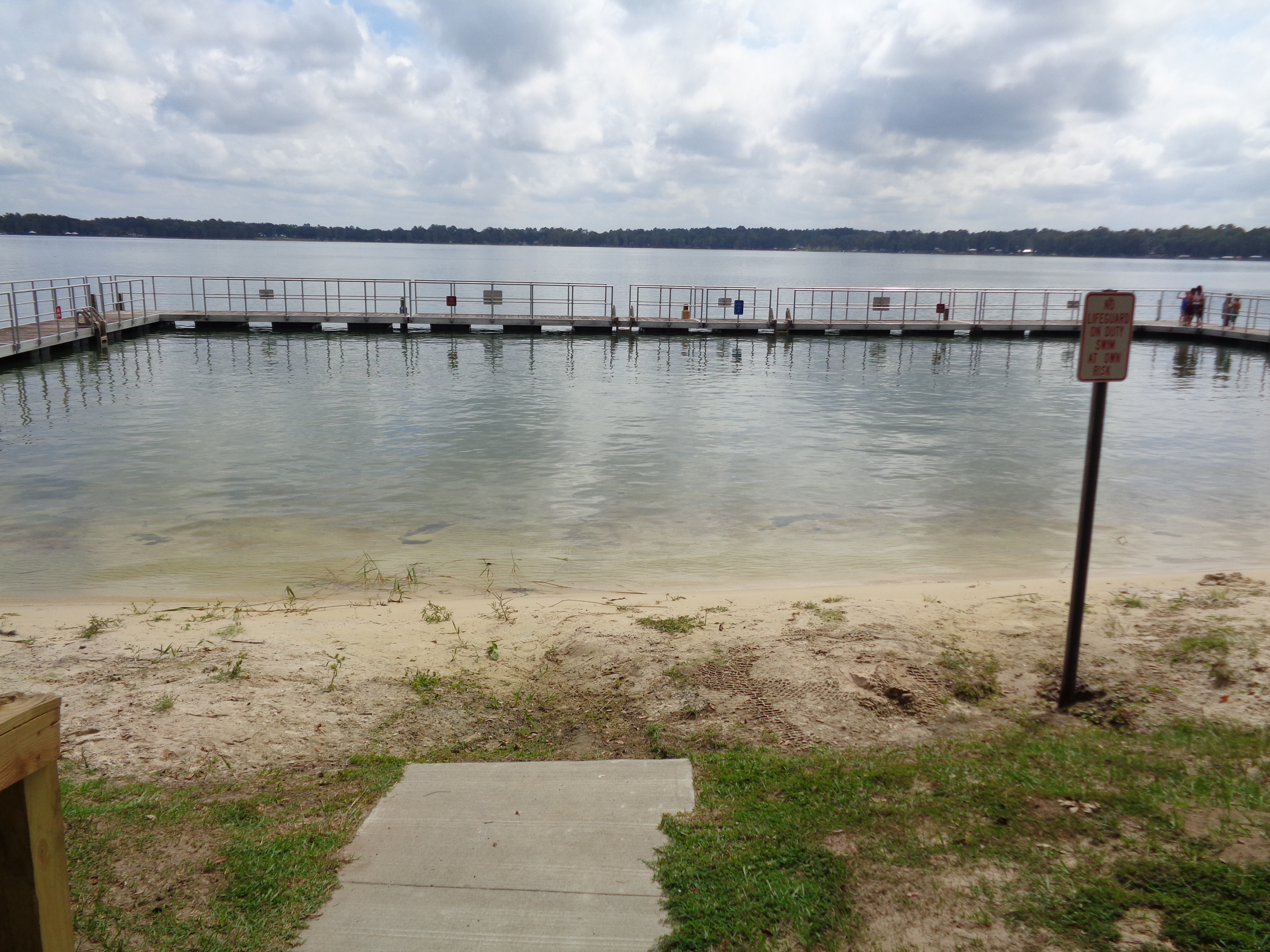
Cherry lake Public Beach

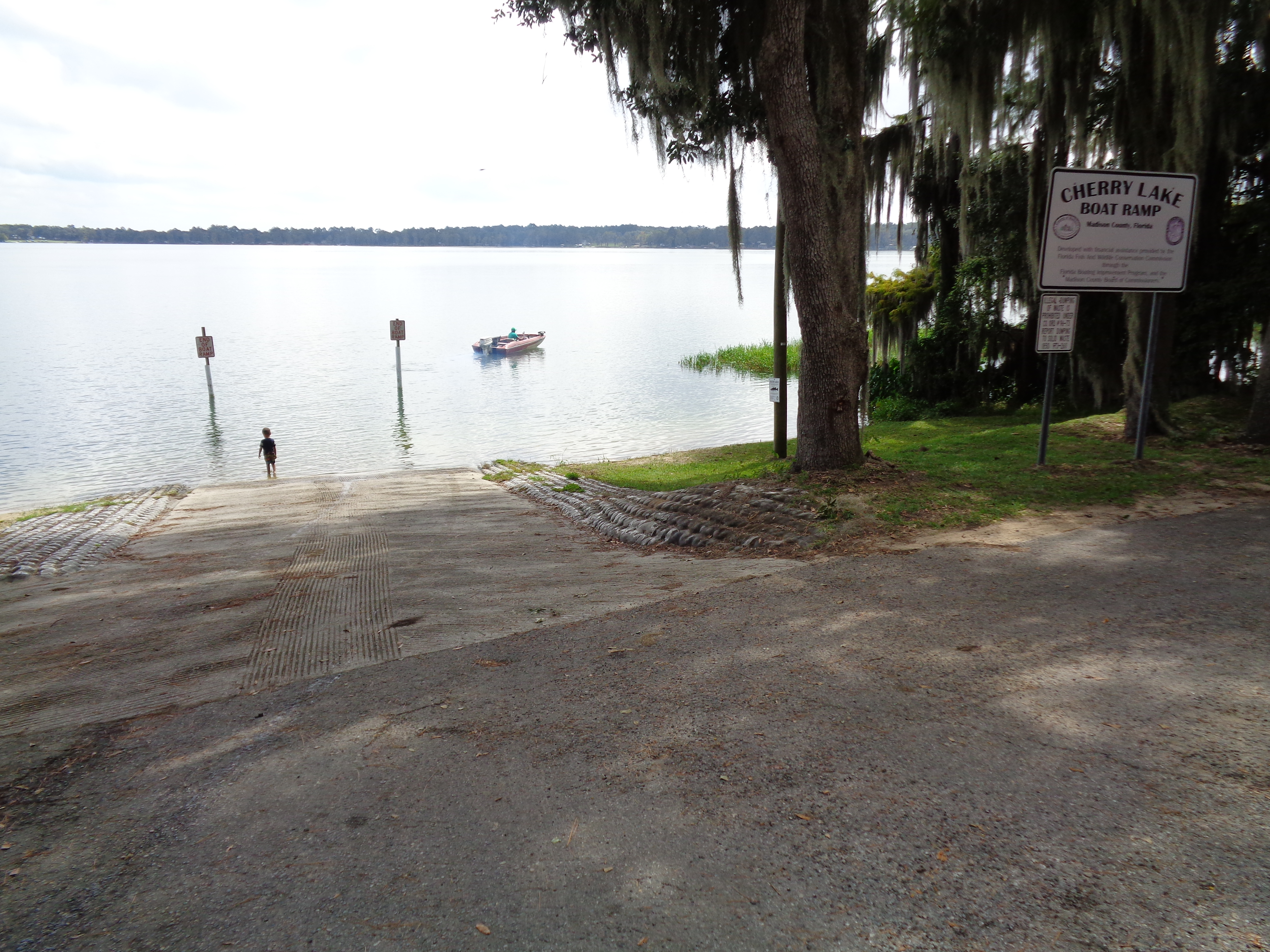
Cherry Lake Boat Ramp

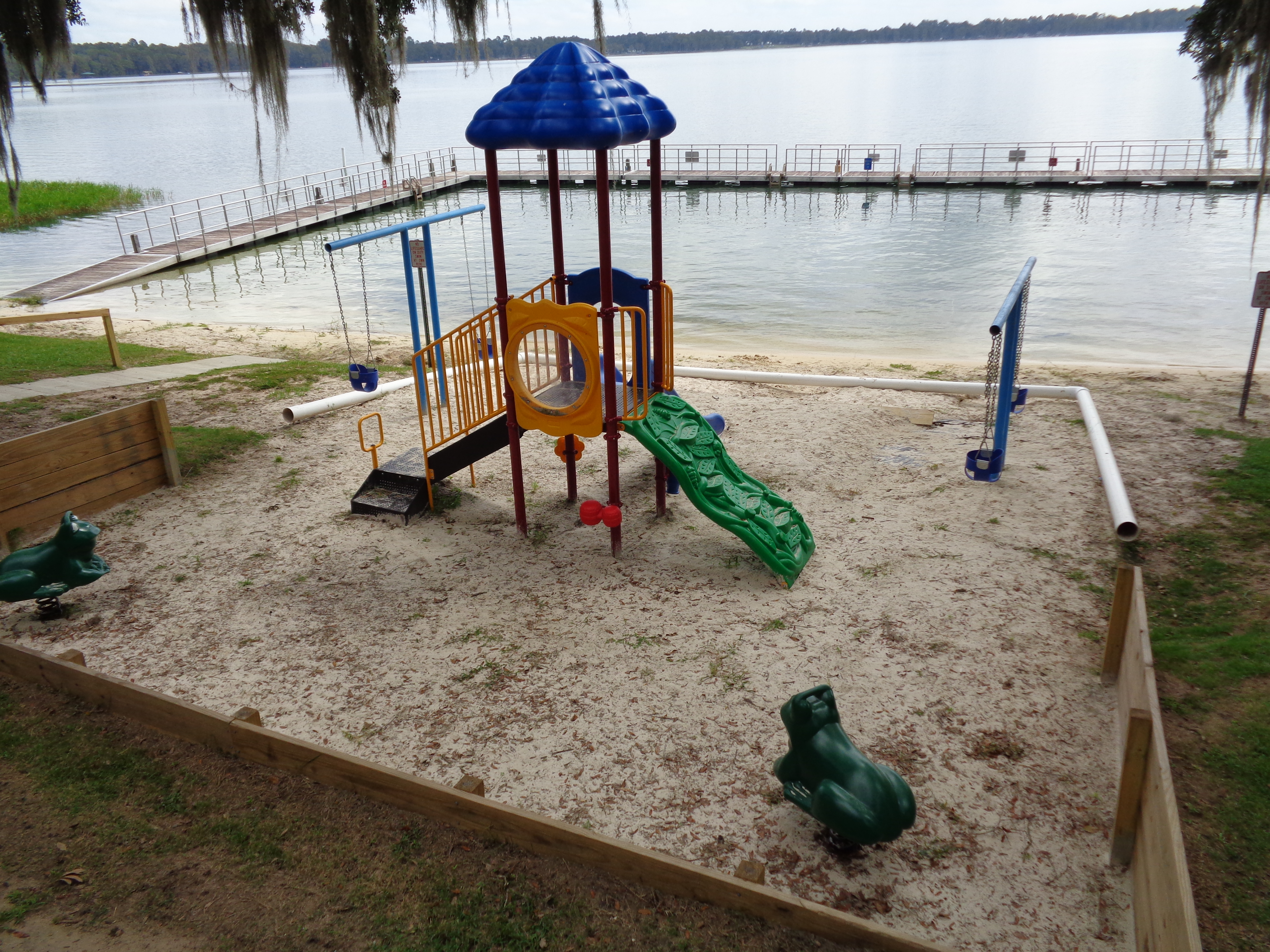
Public beach and playground

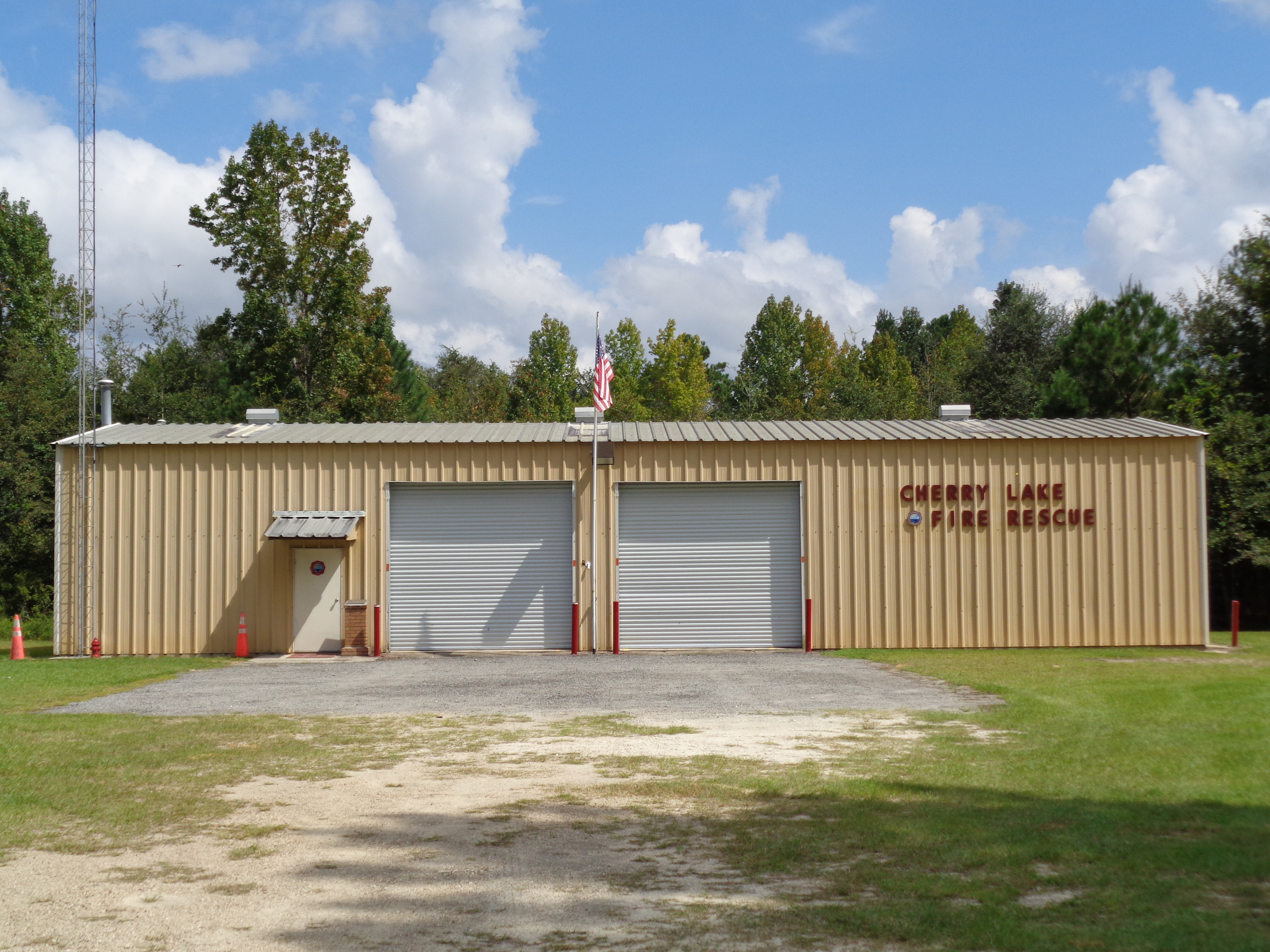
Cherry Lake Fire Rescue

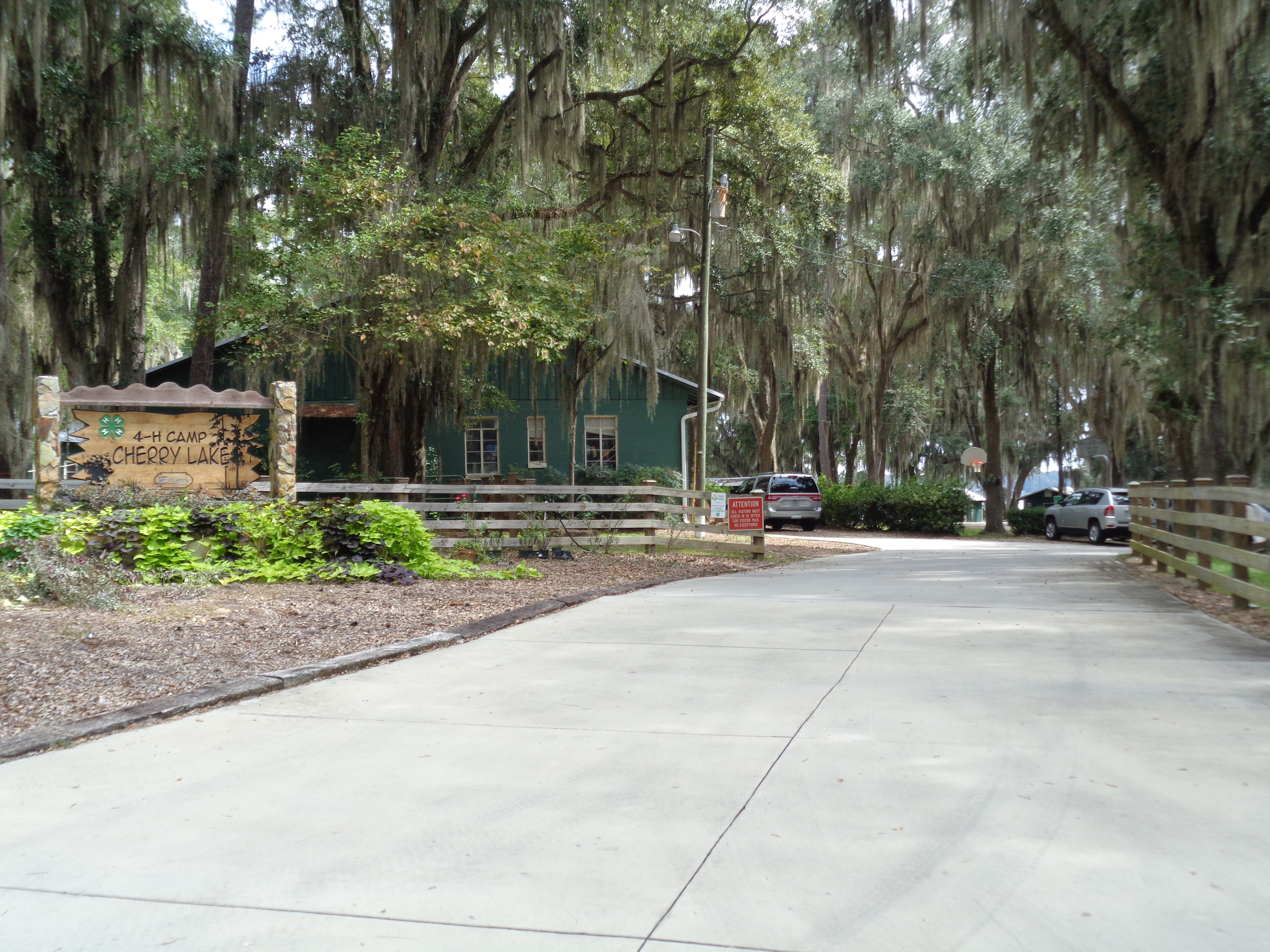
4-H camp

== See also ==
- Ocklawaha, Florida
