= Alton, Florida =

Unincorporated community in Florida, U.S.

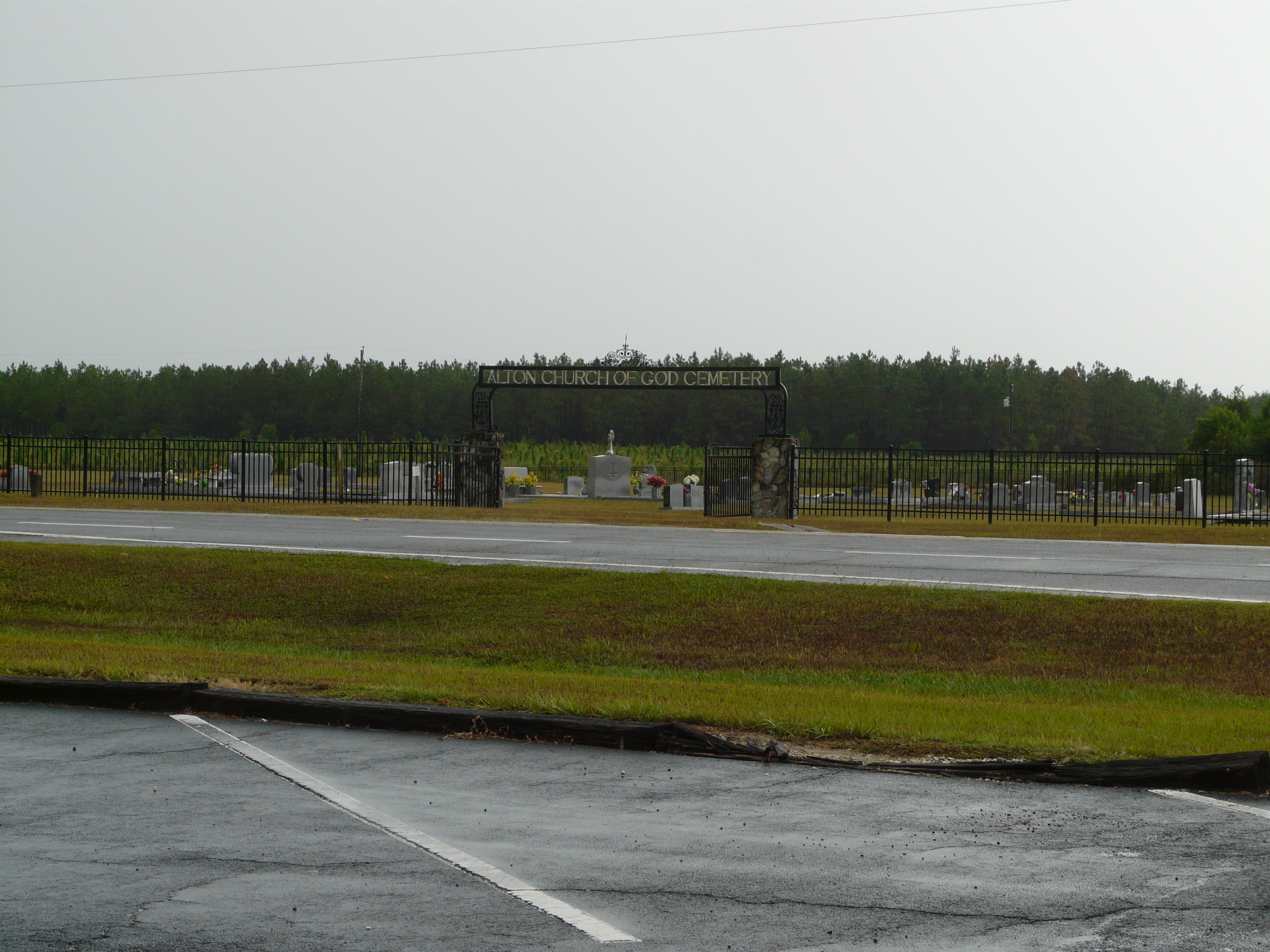
Alton Church of God Cemetery

Alton is an unincorporated community in Lafayette County, Florida, United States. Its elevation is 72 feet and it is located at 30°03′11″N 83°08′16″W.
