= Day, Florida =

- Census-designated place (CDP) & Unincorporated community
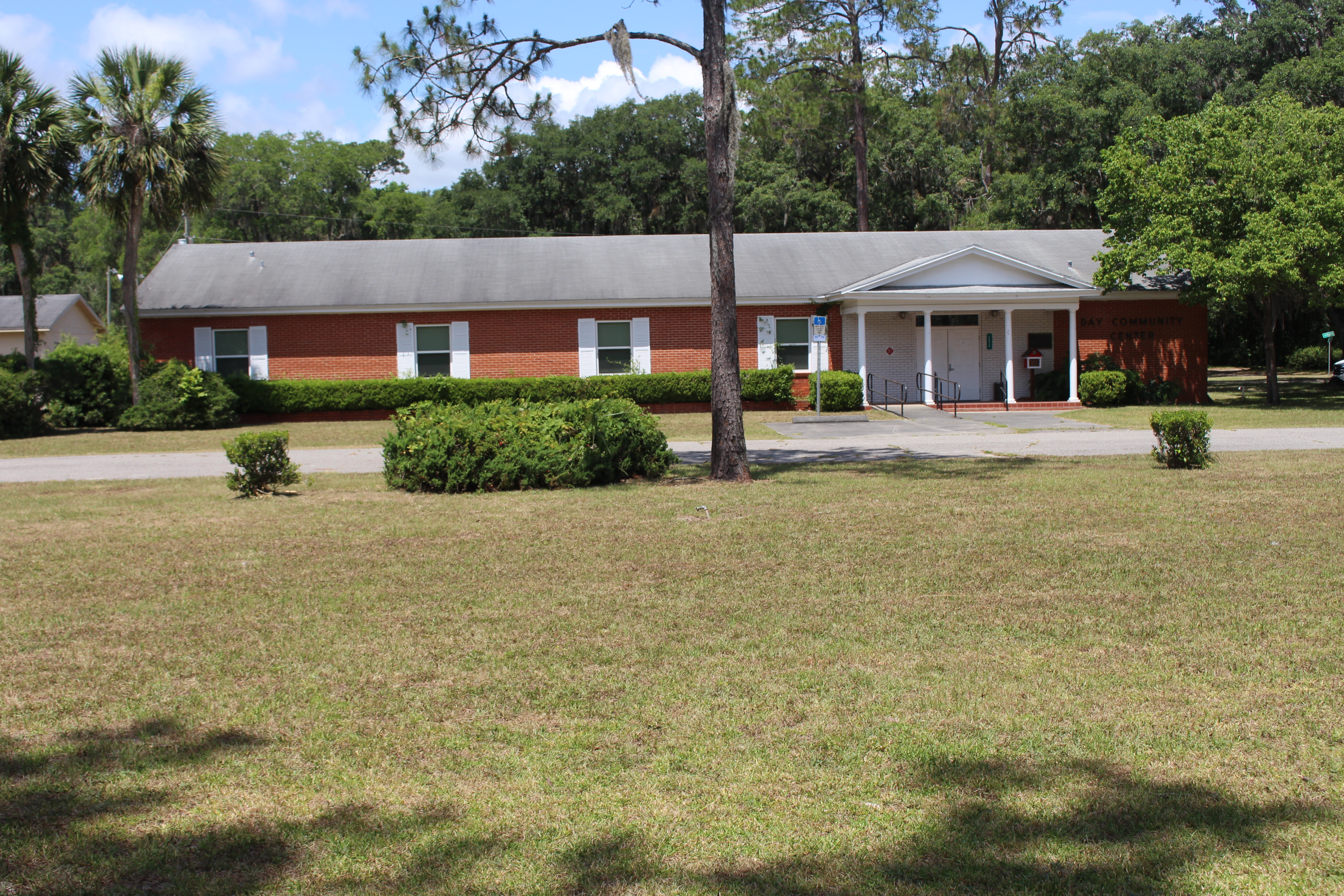
- Day Community Center

- Location within Florida
- Coordinates: 30°11′42″N 83°17′27″W
- Country: United States
- State: Florida
- County: Lafayette

Area
  - Total: 0.92 sq mi (2.39 km^{2})
  - Land: 0.91 sq mi (2.35 km^{2})
  - Water: 0.015 sq mi (0.04 km^{2})
- Elevation: 85 ft (26 m)

Population (2020)
  - Total: 89
  - Density: 98.2/sq mi (37.92/km^{2})
- Time zone: UTC-5 (Eastern (EST))
  - Summer (DST): UTC-4 (EDT)
- ZIP code: 32013
- Area code: 386
- GNIS feature ID: 2628520

Day is an unincorporated community and census-designated place in Lafayette County, Florida, United States. Its population was 89 as of the 2020 census. Day has a post office with ZIP code 32013.

== Demographics ==
Historical population
Census	Pop.	Note	%±
2020	89		—
U.S. Decennial Census

Day first appeared as a census designated place in the 2010 U.S. census.
