= Homer Putnal =

American politician

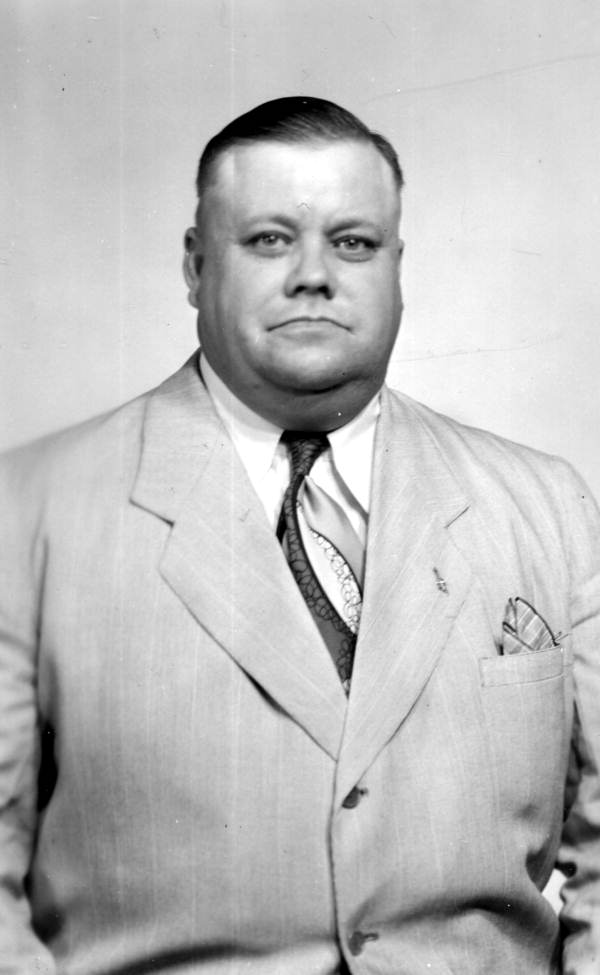

Member of the Florida House of Representatives
- In office 1951–1966

Personal details
- Born: September 25, 1907 Lafayette County, Florida
- Died: April 29, 1987 (aged 79) Mayo, Florida
- Party: Democratic

Homer T. Putnal (September 25, 1907 – April 29, 1987) was an American politician in the state of Florida. He served in the Florida House of Representatives from 1951 to 1966.
