= Lafayette County Courthouse =

Lafayette County Courthouse may refer to:

- Lafayette County Courthouse (Arkansas), Lewisville, Arkansas
- Lafayette County Courthouse (Florida), Mayo, Florida
- Old Lafayette County Courthouse, Mayo, Florida
- Lafayette County Courthouse (Mississippi), Oxford, Mississippi
- Lafayette County Courthouse (Missouri), Lexington, Missouri
- Lafayette County Courthouse (Wisconsin), Darlington, Wisconsin
