= Hal W. Adams Bridge =

Historic bridge in Florida, United States

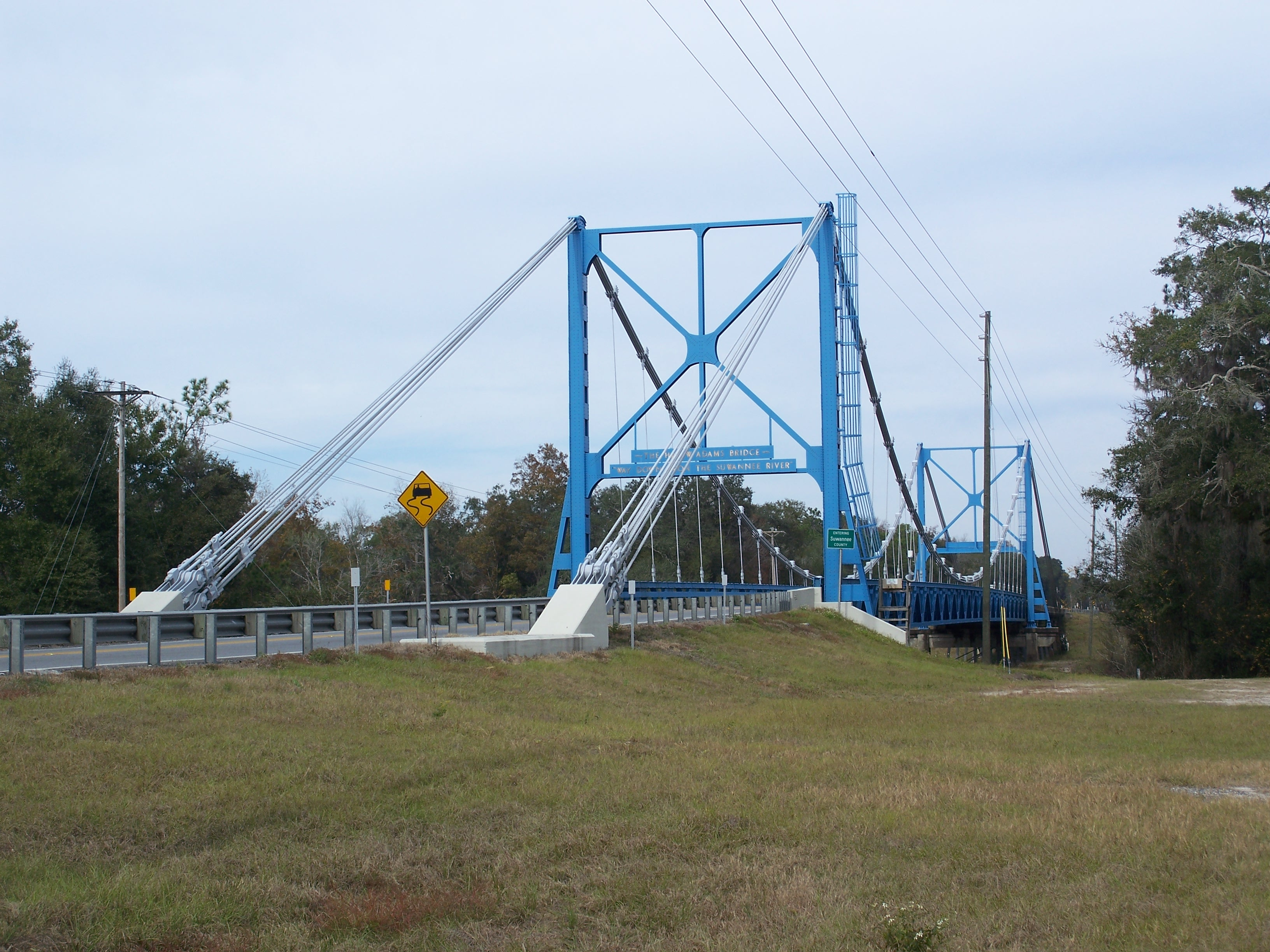
- Hal W. Adams Bridge in 2009
- Coordinates: 30°05′57″N 83°10′18″W
- Carries: 2 lanes of SR 51
- Crosses: Suwannee River
- Locale: Between Lafayette and Suwannee countries, U.S.
- Maintained by: Florida Department of Transportation
- ID number: 330009

Characteristics
- Design: Suspension bridge
- Longest span: 423 ft.

History
- Opened: July 4, 1947

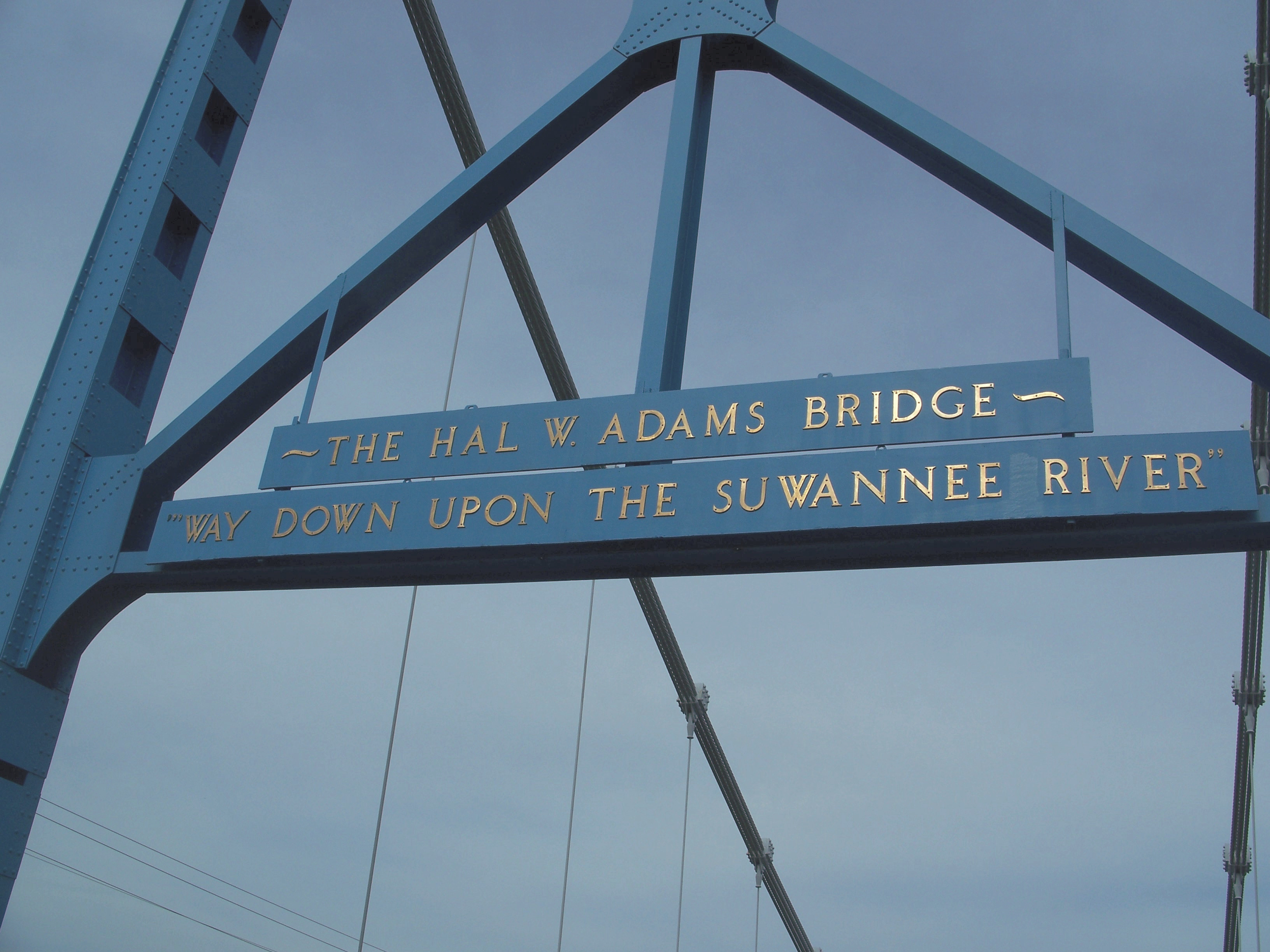
"Way down upon the Suwannee River"

The Hal W. Adams Bridge, built in 1947, is a historic bridge that carries State Road 51 across the Suwannee River between Lafayette and Suwannee counties, Florida in the United States. Located 3 miles north of Mayo, it was the first suspension bridge built in Florida, and the only one to carry highway traffic. At its opening on July 4, 1947, it was named for Hal W. Adams of Mayo, former county judge of Lafayette County and then longtime circuit judge for the circuit encompassing Lafayette and Suwannee counties.

In 1989, the Hal W. Adams Bridge was listed in A Guide to Florida's Historic Architecture, published by the University of Florida Press.

== Gallery ==
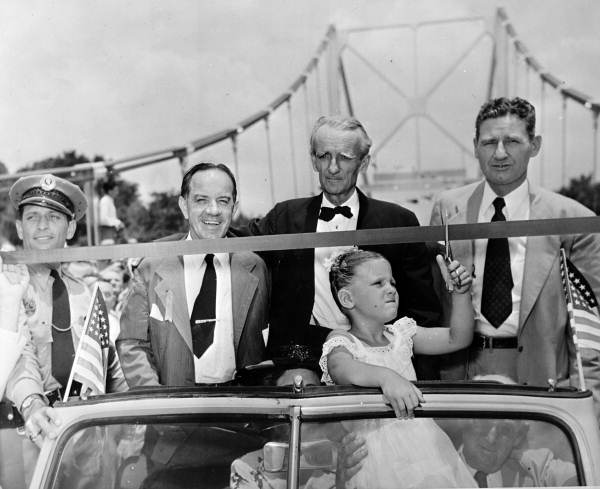
Opening of bridge 1947

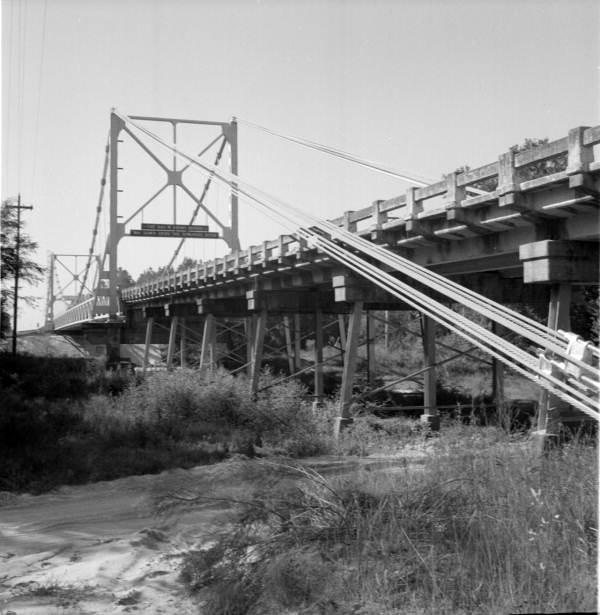
Side view 1981

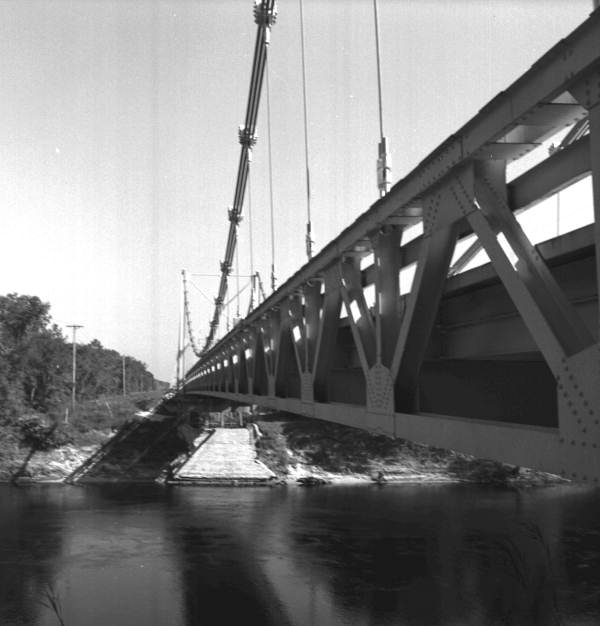
Another view 1981

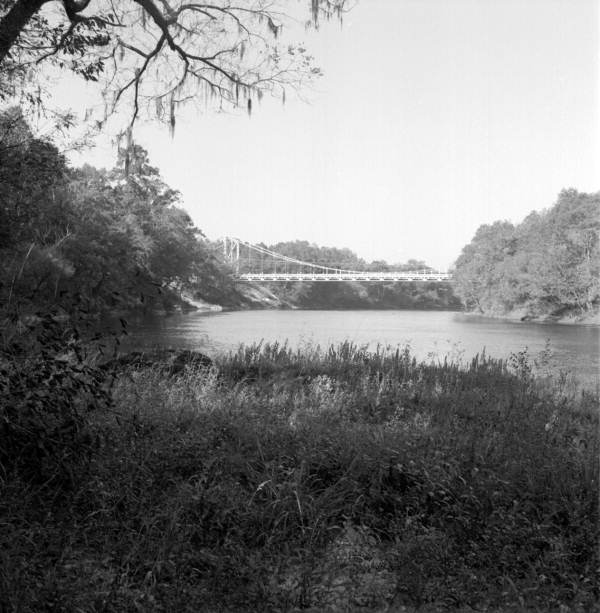
Another view 1981

== See also ==
- List of crossings of the Suwannee River
