= The House of the Seven Gables (disambiguation) =

The House of the Seven Gables or House of the Seven Gables refer primarily to:

- House of the Seven Gables, a 1668 colonial mansion in Salem, Massachusetts made famous by the Hawthorne novel
- The House of the Seven Gables (1851), a novel by Nathaniel Hawthorne, inspired by the house and its history

The terms may also refer to:

- House of the Seven Gables (Mayo, Florida), an octagonal house inspired by the novel
- The House of the Seven Gables (1910 film), the first film adaptation of the novel, starring Mary Fuller
- The House of the Seven Gables (film), the 1940 adaption of the novel
