= M. Pico Building =

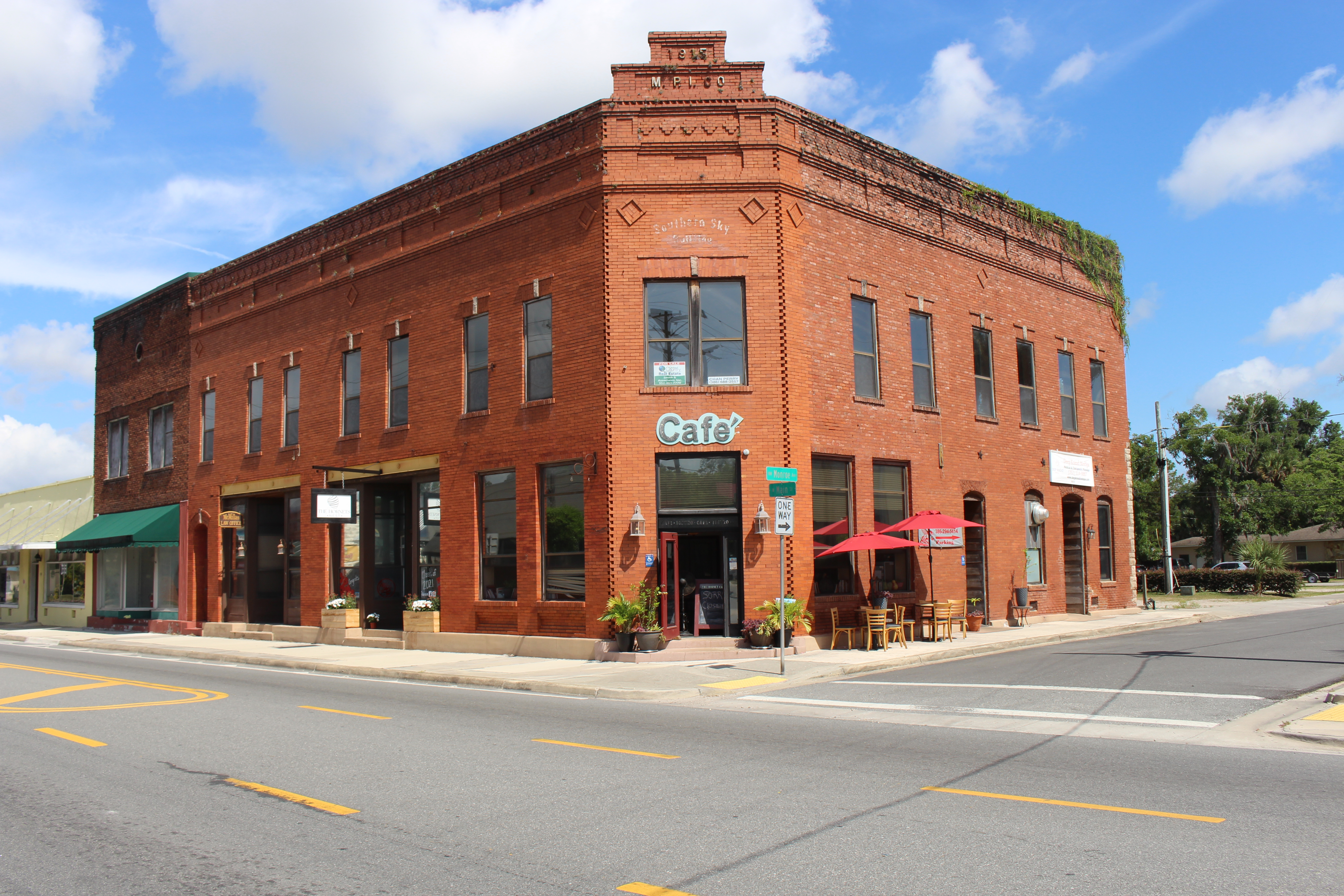
- Interactive map of the M. Pico Building area

General information
- Location: Mayo, Florida, United States
- Coordinates: 30.053175°N 83.176238°W
- Completed: 1915

The M. Pico Building, built in 1915 on the site of a wooden lodge hall that had burned down, is an historic 2-story redbrick building located on the corner of Monroe and Main streets, N.W., across the street from the Lafayette County Courthouse in Mayo, Florida. In 1989, it was listed in A Guide to Florida's Historic Architecture prepared by the Florida Association of the American Institute of Architects and published by the University of Florida Press.

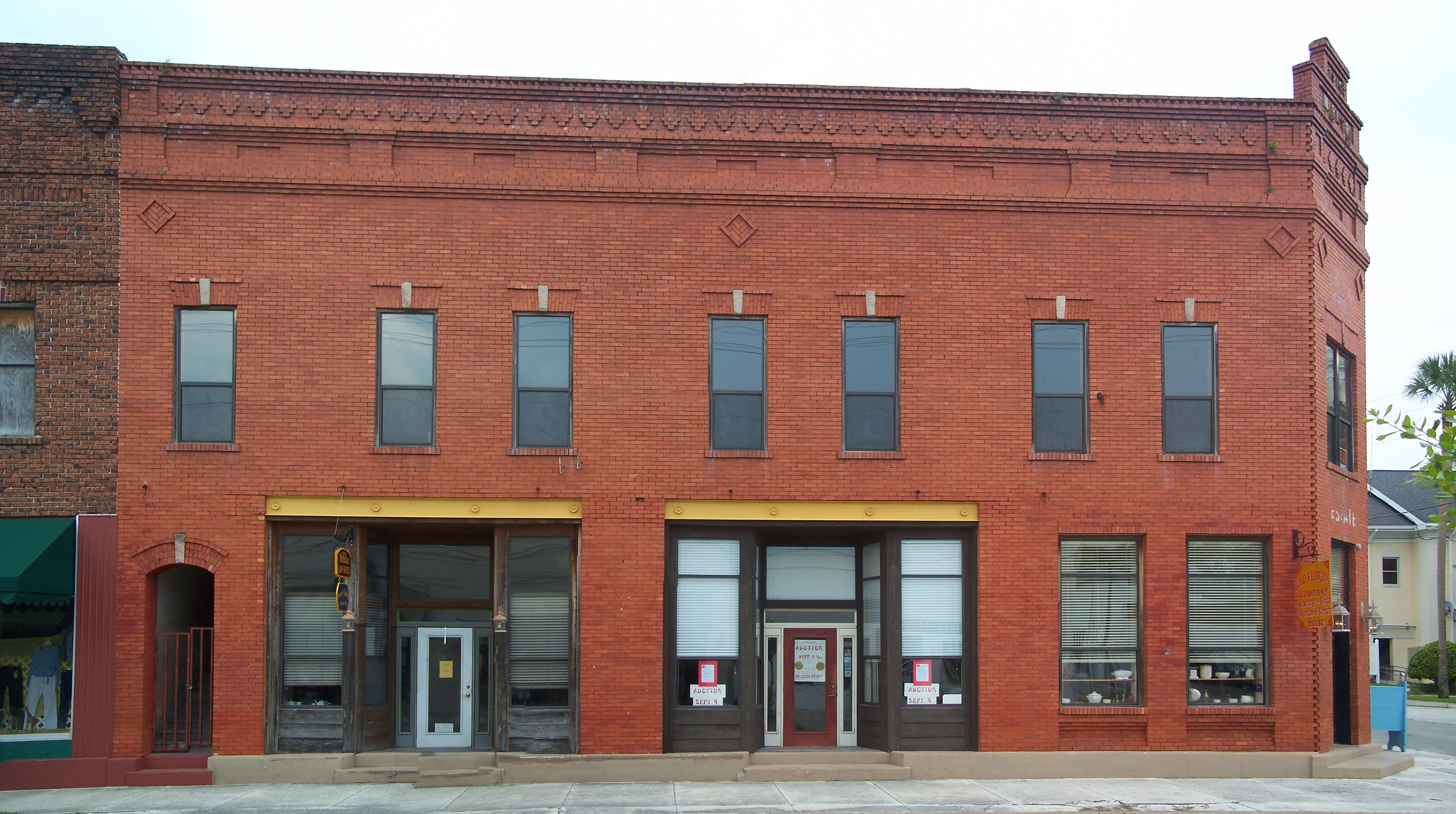
Another view of the building

The M. Pico Building has been called the "Focal point for [Mayo's] central business district." It is a good example of an early 20th Century small-town Florida brick retail/office building.
