= Old Mayo Free Press Building =

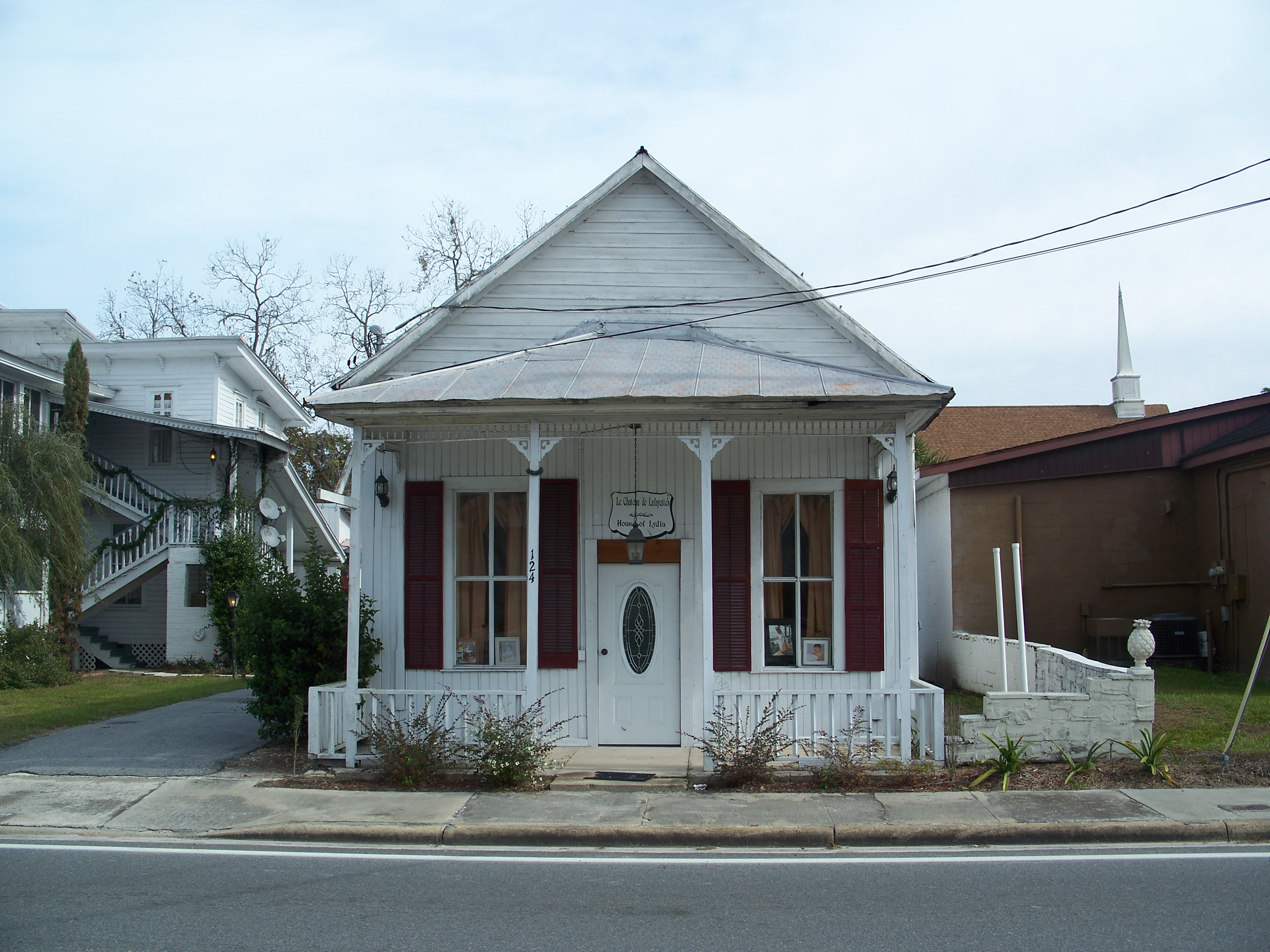
- Interactive map of the Old Mayo Free Press Building area

General information
- Location: Mayo, Florida, United States
- Coordinates: 30.053359°N 83.175165°W
- Completed: 1888

The Old Mayo Free Press Building, built in 1888 to house the Mayo Free Press newspaper, is an historic 20x40-foot wooden frame building located at 124 Fletcher Street, North (State Road 51) in Mayo, Florida. In 1989, it was listed in A Guide to Florida's Historic Architecture prepared by the Florida Association of the American Institute of Architects and published by the University of Florida Press.

The Mayo Free Press later moved to a brick office building on the corner of San Pedro and Main street, which had been built in 1916 to house a drug store. The Mayo Free Press is now part of the Suwannee Democrat.

In the 1980s the Old Mayo Free Press Building housed Granny's Country Store'. Today a sign on its front door proclaims that it is Le Chateau de Lafayette's House of Lydia. It is just south of the Old Lafayette County Courthouse which was moved to its present site around 1908 and now houses a bed and breakfast called Le Chateau de Lafayette.
