= Lafayette Blue Springs State Park =

State park in Florida, USA

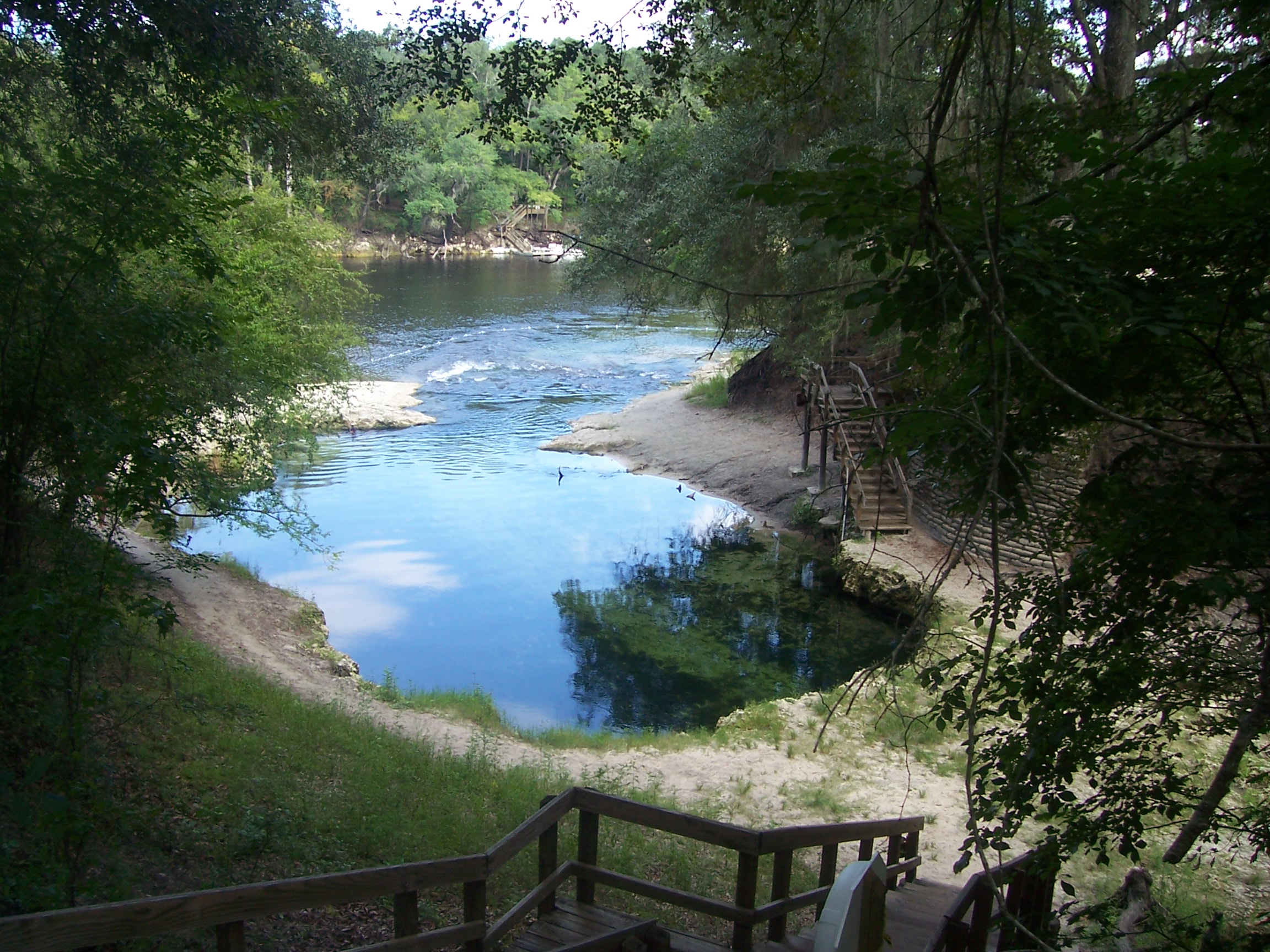
- View of the karst spring

- Location within Florida Location within the United States
- Interactive map of Lafayette Blue Springs State Park
- Location: Lafayette County, Florida, USA
- Nearest city: Mayo, Florida
- Coordinates: 30°7′35″N 83°13′34″W
- Governing body: Florida Department of Environmental Protection

Lafayette Blue Springs State Park is a Florida State Park, located on the west side of the Suwannee River, seven miles northwest of Mayo, off US 27. It contains one of the state's 33 first magnitude springs, with a daily discharge of up to 168 million gallons.

== Springs ==
The park has two main spring runs, Lafayette Blue and Allen Millpond, which flow into the Suwannee River. Allen Millpond is a second-magnitude spring and the former site of a mill; remnants of its timbers are visible where the spring run meets the river.

== Fauna ==
Many animals live in and around the park. Among the mammals found there are white-tailed deer and gray squirrel. Reptiles that have been seen are the, alligator, eastern glass lizard, as well as gulf hammock rat, red-bellied, rough green and coral snakes.

Bird sightings in the park have included barred owls, cardinals, doves, eagles, flycatchers, red-shouldered hawks, kites, sparrows, swifts, thrushes, warblers, waxwings, pileated woodpeckers, and wrens.

== Recreational Activities ==
The park has such amenities as boating, canoeing, fishing, hiking, kayaking, picnicking areas, scuba diving, snorkeling, swimming, and wildlife viewing. It also has primitive camping and restroom facilities.

== Hours ==
Florida state parks are open between 8 a.m. and sundown every day of the year (including holidays).

== Gallery ==
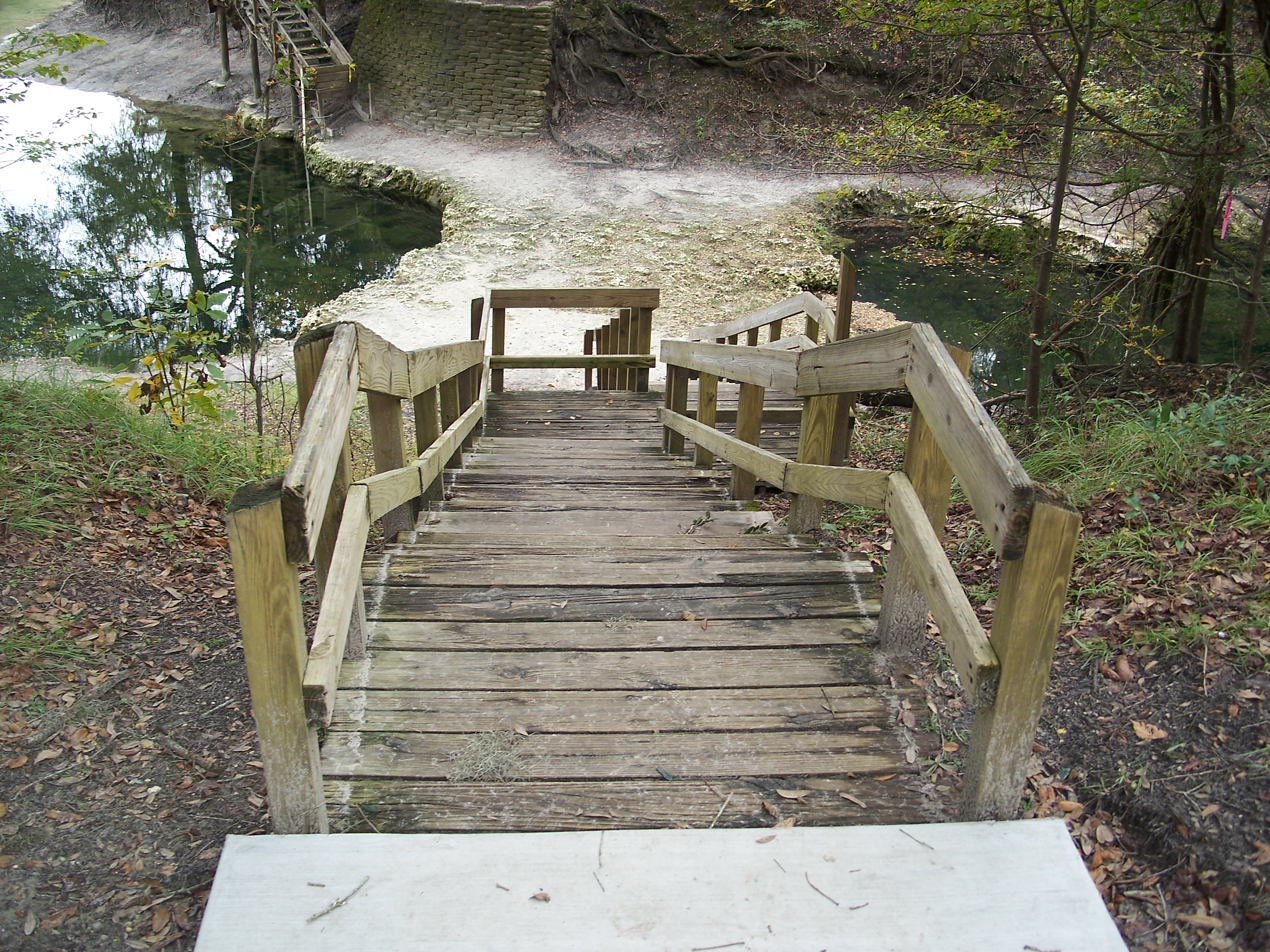
Stairs

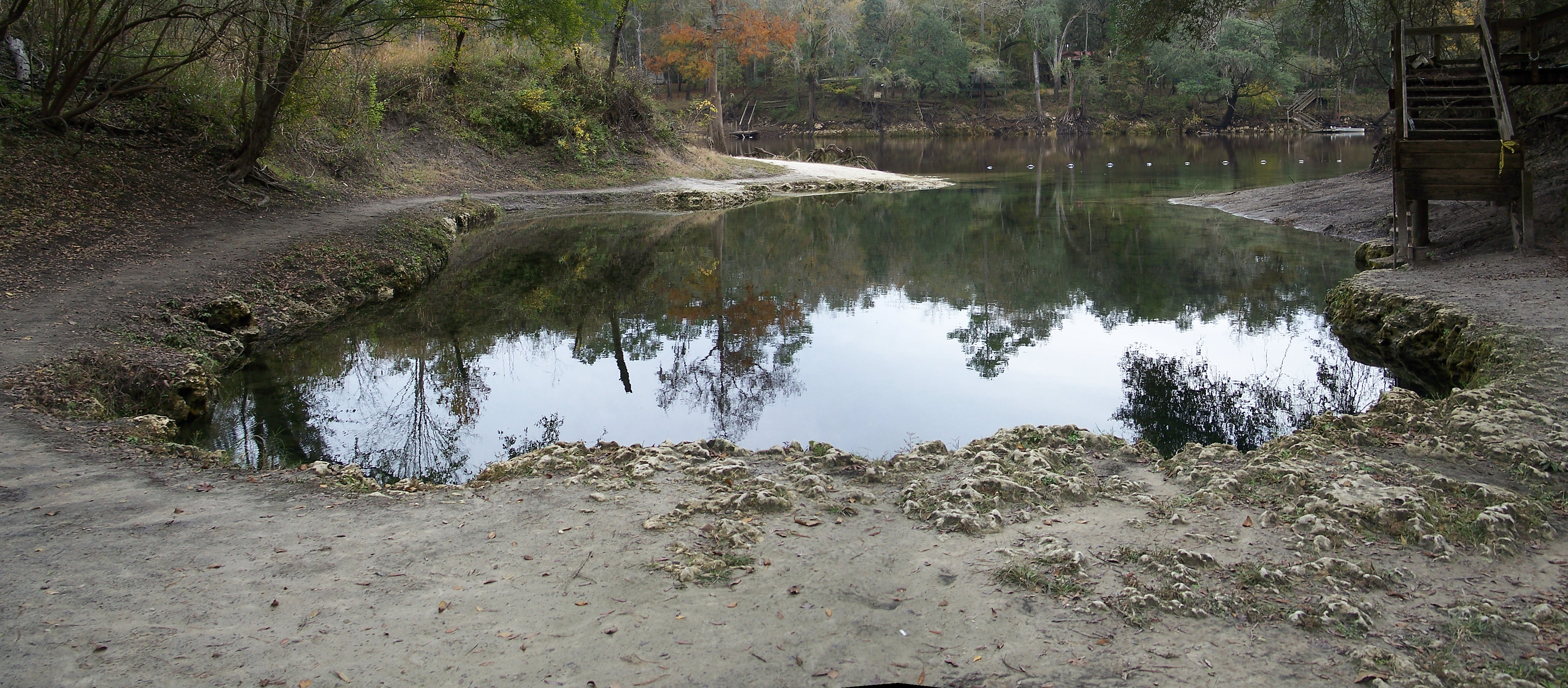
Panoramic view of karst spring

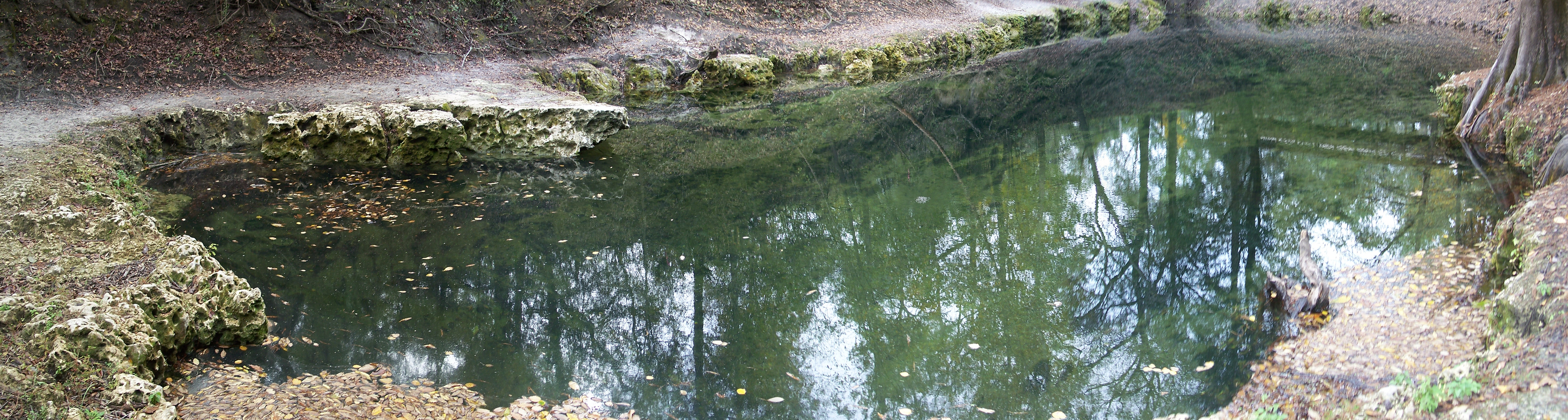
A similar view of the spring

== References and external links ==
- Lafayette Blue Springs State Park at Florida State Parks
