= Lafayette County, Florida =

County in Florida, United States

- County
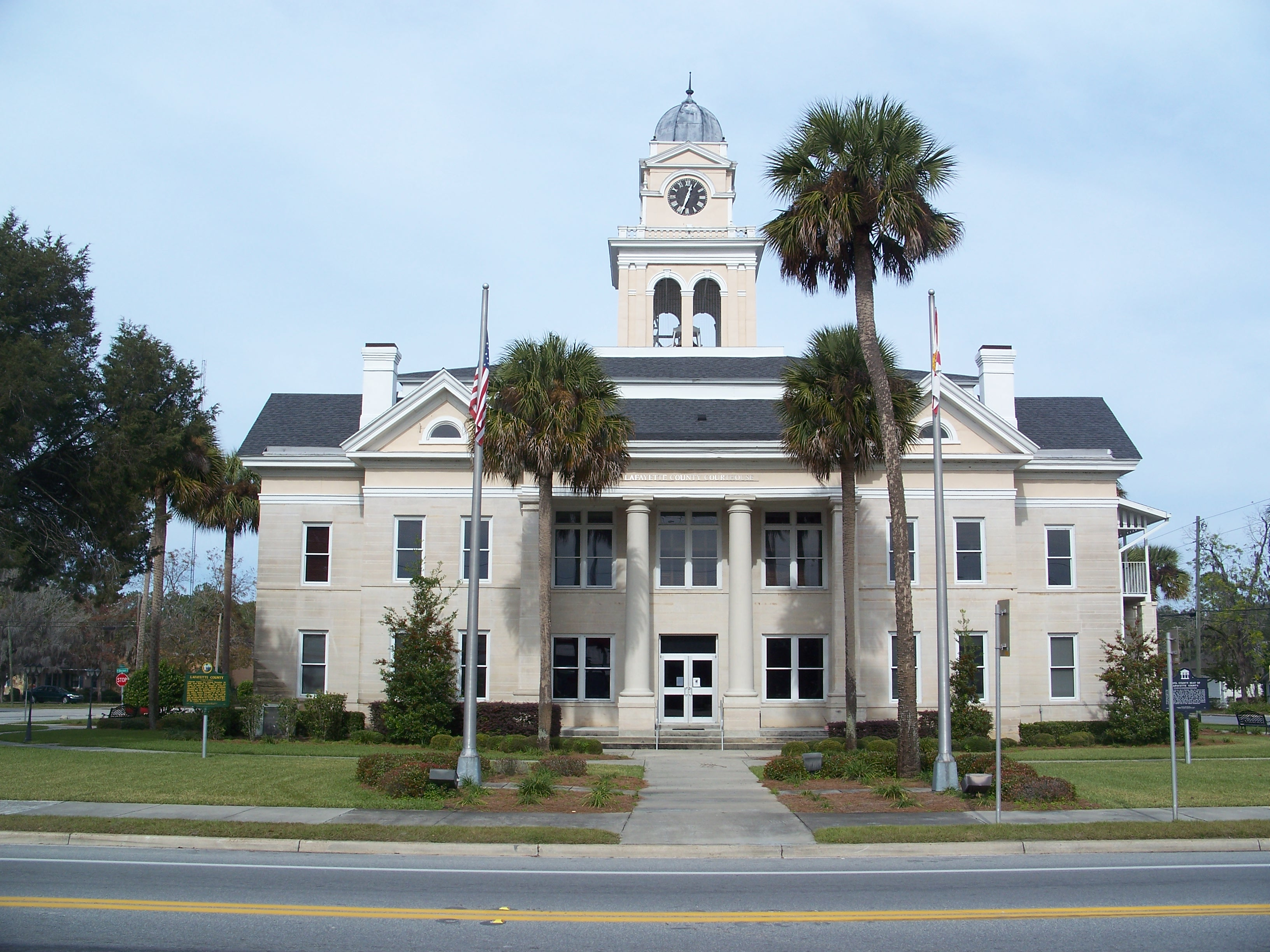
- Lafayette County Courthouse

- Location within the U.S. state of Florida
- Coordinates: 29°59′N 83°11′W
- Country: United States
- State: Florida
- Founded: December 23, 1853
- Named for: Marquis de Lafayette
- Seat: Mayo
- Largest town: Mayo

Area
  - Total: 548 sq mi (1,420 km^{2})
  - Land: 543 sq mi (1,410 km^{2})
  - Water: 4.5 sq mi (12 km^{2}) 0.8%

Population (2020)
  - Total: 8,226
  - Estimate (2025): 8,792 ▲
  - Density: 15.1/sq mi (5.85/km^{2})
- Time zone: UTC−5 (Eastern)
  - Summer (DST): UTC−4 (EDT)
- Congressional districts: 2nd, 3rd
- Website: lafayettecountyfl.org

Lafayette County is a county located in the north central portion of the state of Florida. As of the 2020 census, the population was 8,226, making it the second-least populous county in Florida. The county seat is Mayo. Lafayette County is a prohibition or partially dry county, allowing retail sales of beer.

== History ==
Lafayette County was created on December 23, 1856, from part of Madison County on the same day as Taylor County was also split off from Madison County. At the time it comprised all the area of present-day Lafayette and Dixie counties. The county was named in honor of the Marquis de Lafayette, the French general who rendered assistance to the Continental Army in the American Revolutionary War. The famed Suwannee River forms the entire eastern boundary. The county courts first met at the home of Ariel Jones near Fayetteville. The county seat was New Troy until the court house burned down on New Year's Eve, 1892. It was moved to Mayo in 1893, and Mayo is currently Lafayette's only incorporated town. The moving of the courthouse was the end for New Troy. The Gainesville Sun states that houses were dismantled for their timber and bricks, hardwoods replaced the fields, steamboat traffic ended in 1899, and the ferry closed in 1917. In 1921 the lower part of the county was removed to create Dixie County.

=== Historic sites ===
Historic sites in Lafayette County include:

- The Hal W. Adams Bridge built in 1947 across the Suwannee River 3 mi (4.8 km) north of Mayo. It was Florida's first suspension bridge.
- The (second) Old Lafayette County Courthouse, built in 1893–1894, now an inn.
- The current Lafayette County Courthouse built in 1908.

== Geography ==
According to the U.S. Census Bureau, the county has a total area of 548 square miles (1,420 km^{2}), of which 543 square miles (1,410 km^{2}) is land and 4.5 square miles (12 km^{2}) (0.8%) is water.

=== Adjacent counties ===
- Suwannee County - east
- Gilchrist County - southeast
- Dixie County - south
- Taylor County - west
- Madison County - northwest

== Demographics ==
Historical population
Census	Pop.	Note	%±
1860	2,068		—
1870	1,783		−13.8%
1880	2,441		36.9%
1890	3,686		51.0%
1900	4,987		35.3%
1910	6,710		34.5%
1920	6,242		−7.0%
1930	4,361		−30.1%
1940	4,405		1.0%
1950	3,440		−21.9%
1960	2,889		−16.0%
1970	2,892		0.1%
1980	4,035		39.5%
1990	5,578		38.2%
2000	7,022		25.9%
2010	8,870		26.3%
2020	8,226		−7.3%
2025 (est.)	8,792	▲	6.9%
U.S. Decennial Census; 1790-1960 1900-1990; 1990-2000 2010-2019

=== Racial and ethnic composition ===
Lafayette County, Florida – Racial and ethnic composition Note: the US Census treats Hispanic/Latino as an ethnic category. This table excludes Latinos from the racial categories and assigns them to a separate category. Hispanics/Latinos may be of any race.
Race / Ethnicity (NH = Non-Hispanic)	Pop 1980	Pop 1990	Pop 2000	Pop 2010	Pop 2020	% 1980	% 1990	% 2000	% 2010	% 2020
White alone (NH)	3,700	4,554	5,286	6,266	6,074	91.70%	81.64%	75.28%	70.64%	73.84%
Black or African American alone (NH)	288	772	989	1,396	1,024	7.14%	13.84%	14.08%	15.74%	12.45%
Native American or Alaska Native alone (NH)	6	17	33	20	16	0.15%	0.30%	0.47%	0.23%	0.19%
Asian alone (NH)	5	9	8	13	10	0.12%	0.16%	0.11%	0.15%	0.12%
Native Hawaiian or Pacific Islander alone (NH)	x	x	1	2	1	x	x	0.01%	0.02%	0.01%
Other race alone (NH)	5	0	7	7	18	0.12%	0.00%	0.10%	0.08%	0.22%
Mixed race or Multiracial (NH)	x	x	56	90	145	x	x	0.80%	1.01%	1.76%
Hispanic or Latino (any race)	31	226	642	1,076	938	0.77%	4.05%	9.14%	12.13%	11.40%
Total	4,035	5,578	7,022	8,870	8,226	100.00%	100.00%	100.00%	100.00%	100.00%

=== 2020 census ===
As of the 2020 census, the county had a population of 8,226, 2,727 households, and 1,891 families. The population density was 15.1 per square mile (5.8/km^{2}). The median age was 44.3 years; 17.1% of residents were under the age of 18, 7.5% were between 18 and 24, 26.5% were between 25 and 44, 28.3% were between 45 and 64, and 20.6% were 65 years of age or older. For every 100 females there were 137.3 males, and for every 100 females age 18 and over there were 147.7 males age 18 and over.

The racial makeup of the county was 77.4% White, 12.7% Black or African American, 0.3% American Indian and Alaska Native, 0.1% Asian, 0.1% Native Hawaiian and Pacific Islander, 5.1% from some other race, and 4.3% from two or more races. Hispanic or Latino residents of any race comprised 11.4% of the population.

<0.1% of residents lived in urban areas, while 100.0% lived in rural areas.

There were 2,727 households in the county, of which 28.7% had children under the age of 18 living in them. Of all households, 53.4% were married-couple households, 19.3% were households with a male householder and no spouse or partner present, and 22.3% were households with a female householder and no spouse or partner present. About 25.5% of all households were made up of individuals and 14.6% had someone living alone who was 65 years of age or older.

There were 3,284 housing units, of which 17.0% were vacant. Among occupied housing units, 77.9% were owner-occupied and 22.1% were renter-occupied. The homeowner vacancy rate was 1.7% and the rental vacancy rate was 11.4%.

=== 2020 American Community Survey ===
The average household size was 3.1 and the average family size was 3.8. The percent of those with a bachelor’s degree or higher was estimated to be 8.7% of the population.

The 2016–2020 5-year American Community Survey estimates show that the median household income was $51,734 (with a margin of error of +/- $6,662). The median family income was $53,625 (+/- $15,651). Males had a median income of $37,939 (+/- $8,513) versus $25,085 (+/- $8,177) for females. The median income for those above 16 years old was $35,009 (+/- $11,623). Approximately, 16.7% of families and 17.9% of the population were below the poverty line, including 16.9% of those under the age of 18 and 19.5% of those ages 65 or over.

=== 2000 census ===
As of the census of 2000, there were 7,022 people, 2,142 households and 1,591 families residing in the county. The population density was 13 people per square mile (5.0 people/km^{2}). There were 2,660 housing units at an average density of 5 per square mile (1.9/km^{2}). The racial makeup of the county was 79.27% White, 14.37% Black or African American, 0.71% Native American, 0.13% Asian, 0.01% Pacific Islander, 4.30% from other races, and 1.21% from two or more races. 9.14% of the population were Hispanic or Latino of any race. In terms of ancestry, 41.1% were English, 8.0% were Irish, 7.1% were American, and 5.3% were German.

There were 2,142 households, out of which 34.00% had children under the age of 18 living with them, 59.20% were married couples living together, 9.20% had a female householder with no husband present, and 25.70% were non-families. 22.00% of all households were made up of individuals, and 10.10% had someone living alone who was 65 years of age or older. The average household size was 2.66 and the average family size was 3.06.

In the county, the population was spread out, with 21.70% under the age of 18, 10.70% from 18 to 24, 34.00% from 25 to 44, 21.30% from 45 to 64, and 12.40% who were 65 years of age or older. The median age was 35 years. For every 100 females there were 148.80 males. For every 100 females age 18 and over, there were 157.80 males.

The median income for a household in the county was $30,651, and the median income for a family was $35,020. Males had a median income of $25,030 versus $22,007 for females. The per capita income for the county was $13,087. About 12.90% of families and 17.50% of the population were below the poverty line, including 23.70% of those under age 18 and 17.30% of those age 65 or over.

== Politics ==
A very rural and landlocked county, Lafayette historically supported the Democratic Party. It has voted Republican for decades now, and recently by wide margins. In the 2024 presidential election, it was the second-most Republican county in Florida.

United States presidential election results for Lafayette County, Florida
Year	Republican		Democratic		Third party(ies)	
Year	No.	%	No.	%	No.	%
1904	122	28.11%	275	63.36%	37	8.53%
1908	90	13.95%	487	75.50%	68	10.54%
1912	73	11.85%	473	76.79%	70	11.36%
1916	45	4.73%	849	89.27%	57	5.99%
1920	69	9.66%	618	86.55%	27	3.78%
1924	33	8.13%	358	88.18%	15	3.69%
1928	135	23.48%	435	75.65%	5	0.87%
1932	27	2.82%	929	97.18%	0	0.00%
1936	80	6.87%	1,084	93.13%	0	0.00%
1940	122	10.07%	1,090	89.93%	0	0.00%
1944	140	14.51%	825	85.49%	0	0.00%
1948	52	4.54%	975	85.15%	118	10.31%
1952	269	21.52%	981	78.48%	0	0.00%
1956	187	15.07%	1,054	84.93%	0	0.00%
1960	297	27.25%	793	72.75%	0	0.00%
1964	648	54.32%	545	45.68%	0	0.00%
1968	137	9.28%	215	14.56%	1,125	76.17%
1972	1,060	85.69%	173	13.99%	4	0.32%
1976	523	31.41%	1,126	67.63%	16	0.96%
1980	795	42.67%	1,034	55.50%	34	1.83%
1984	1,513	63.71%	862	36.29%	0	0.00%
1988	1,451	66.41%	722	33.04%	12	0.55%
1992	1,039	41.15%	867	34.34%	619	24.51%
1996	1,166	50.22%	829	35.70%	327	14.08%
2000	1,670	66.67%	789	31.50%	46	1.84%
2004	2,460	73.98%	845	25.41%	20	0.60%
2008	2,679	79.33%	642	19.01%	56	1.66%
2012	2,668	78.33%	687	20.17%	51	1.50%
2016	2,809	82.35%	518	15.19%	84	2.46%
2020	3,128	85.42%	510	13.93%	24	0.66%
2024	3,296	87.50%	441	11.71%	30	0.80%

== Parks ==
Parks in the county include Lafayette Blue Springs State Park and Troy Spring State Park, both accessible to the Suwannee River.

== Library ==
The Lafayette County Public Library is part of the Three Rivers Regional Library System, which also serves Gilchrist, Dixie, and Taylor counties.

== Communities ==
=== Town ===
- Mayo

=== Census-designated place ===
- Day

=== Other unincorporated communities ===
- Airline
- Alton
- Buckville
- Cooks Hammock
- Hatchbend
- Midway

== Transportation ==
=== Major highways ===
- US 27 (SR 20)
- SR 51
- SR 349

== See also ==
- Dry counties
