= House of the Seven Gables (Mayo, Florida) =

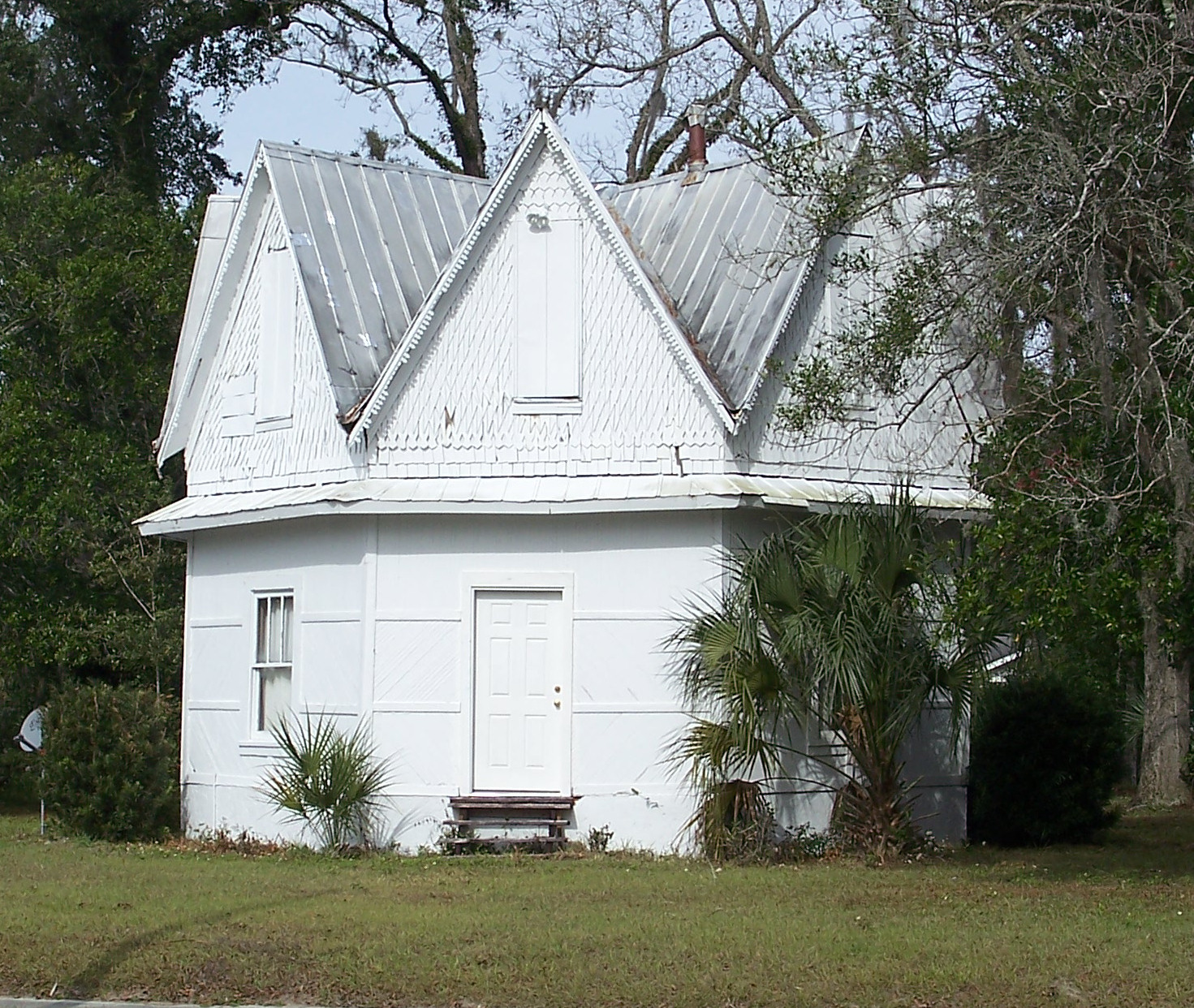
- Interactive map of the House of the Seven Gables area

General information
- Architectural style: Octagon mode
- Location: Mayo, Florida, United States
- Coordinates: 30.053951°N 83.17715°W
- Completed: 1880s
- Demolished: 2021-2022
- Client: James Mitchell

Design and construction
- Architect: James Mitchell
- Engineer: Mack Koon, builder

The House of the Seven Gables built in the 1880s was an historic octagonal house located on the corner of Clark and Bloxham streets, North West, in Mayo, Florida, USA. After reading The House of the Seven Gables by Nathaniel Hawthorne, James Mitchell designed this house and had it built by Mack Koon. Seven of the eight sides are gabled, while the eighth side opens into a rear wing. As built, the house had three bedrooms and a parlor in the octagon section and cooking and dining areas in the wing. Dr. Charles Hailey of the University of Florida cites it as an example of the adaptation of "Florida's small-town vernacular structures, 'minor monuments'", which are worthy of research.

In 1989, it was listed in A Guide to Florida's Historic Architecture prepared by the Florida Association of the American Institute of Architects and published by the University of Florida Press.

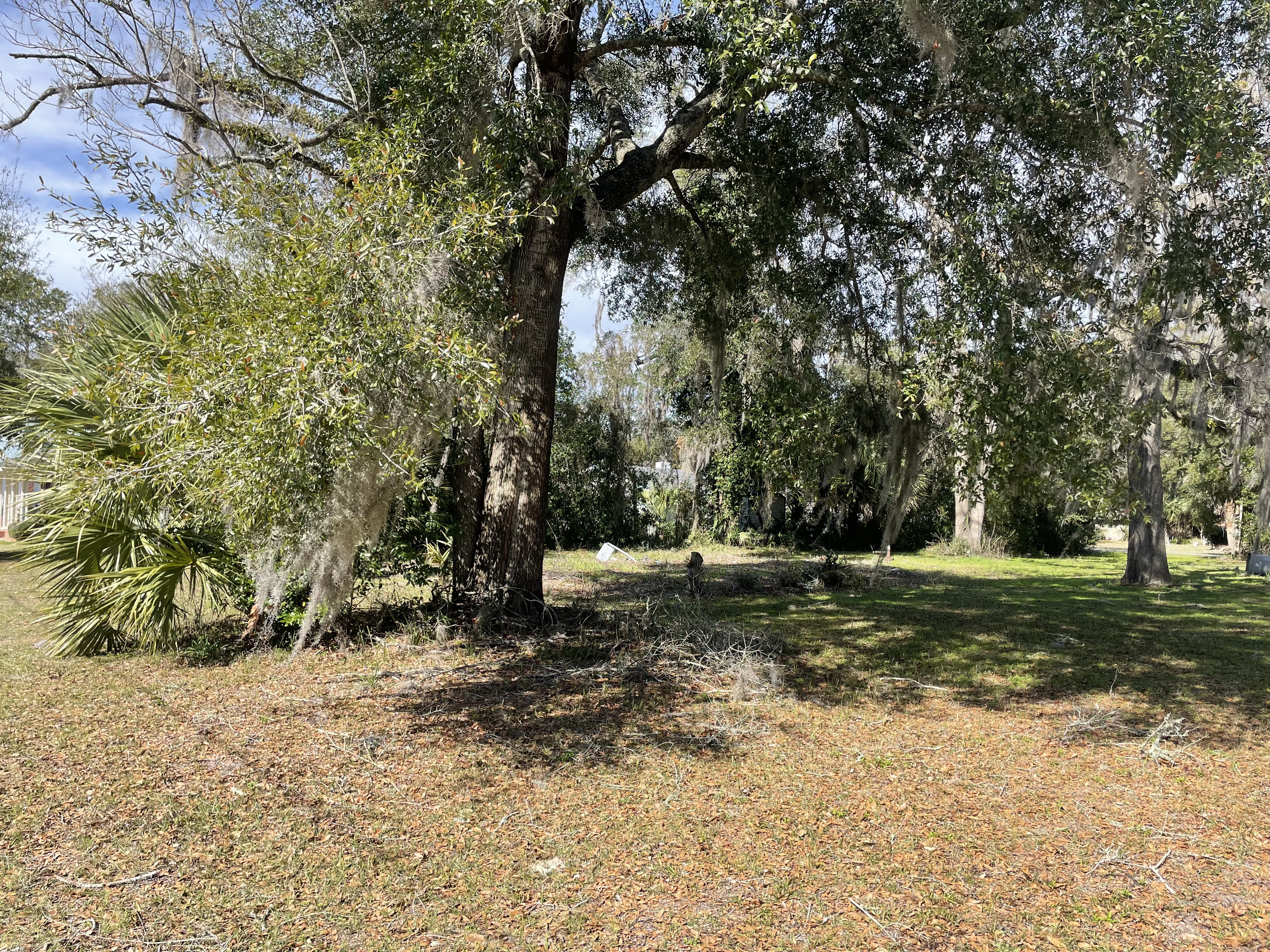
The lot on the corner of Clark and Bloxham streets Feb 5 2023

Recently, a storm nearly demolished the house. No plans are known for any restoration and the house, which had appeared to be beyond repair, has since been dismantled and the lot cleared.

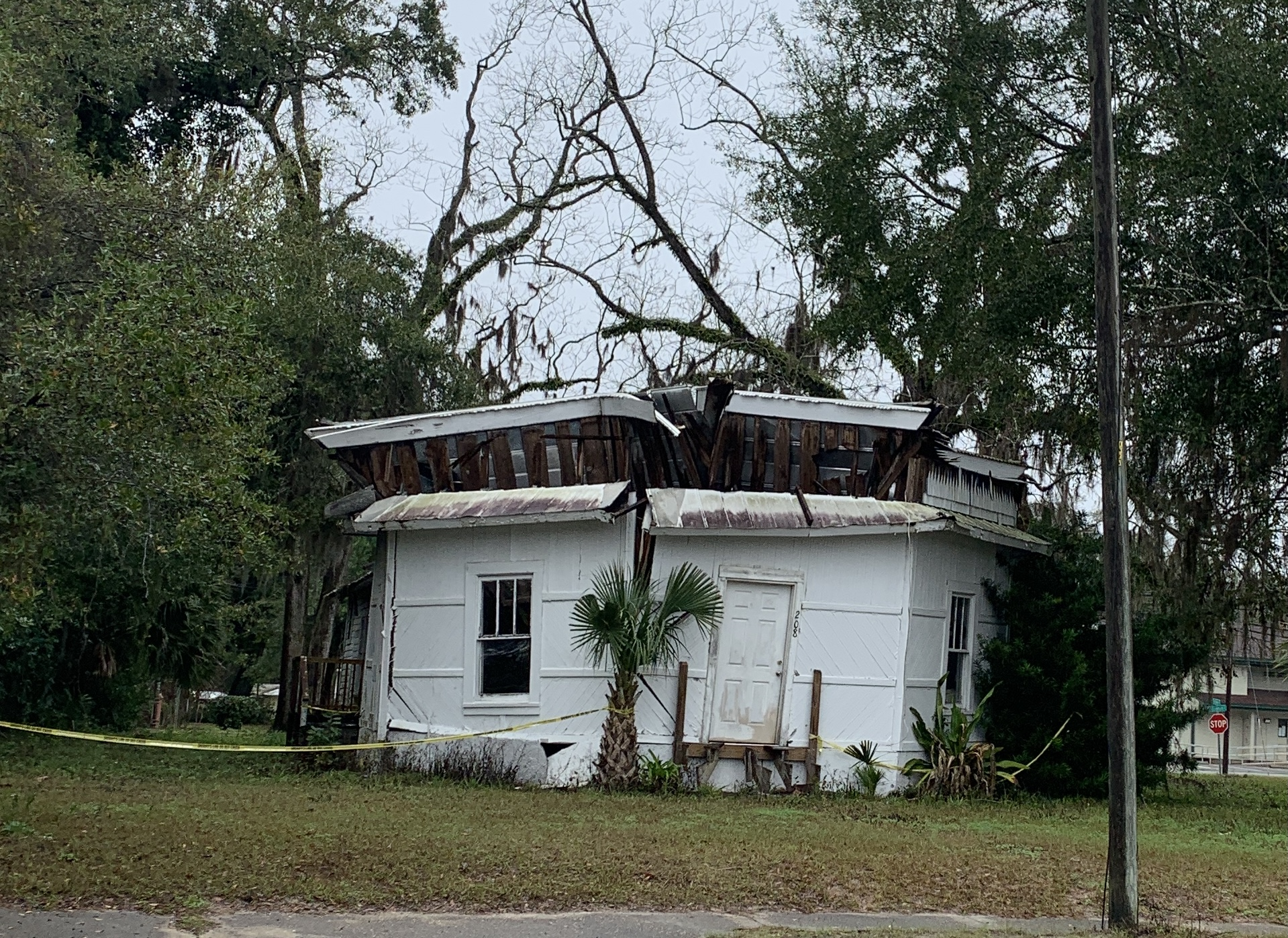
The House of the Seven Gables on Feb 14 2021

== Gallery ==
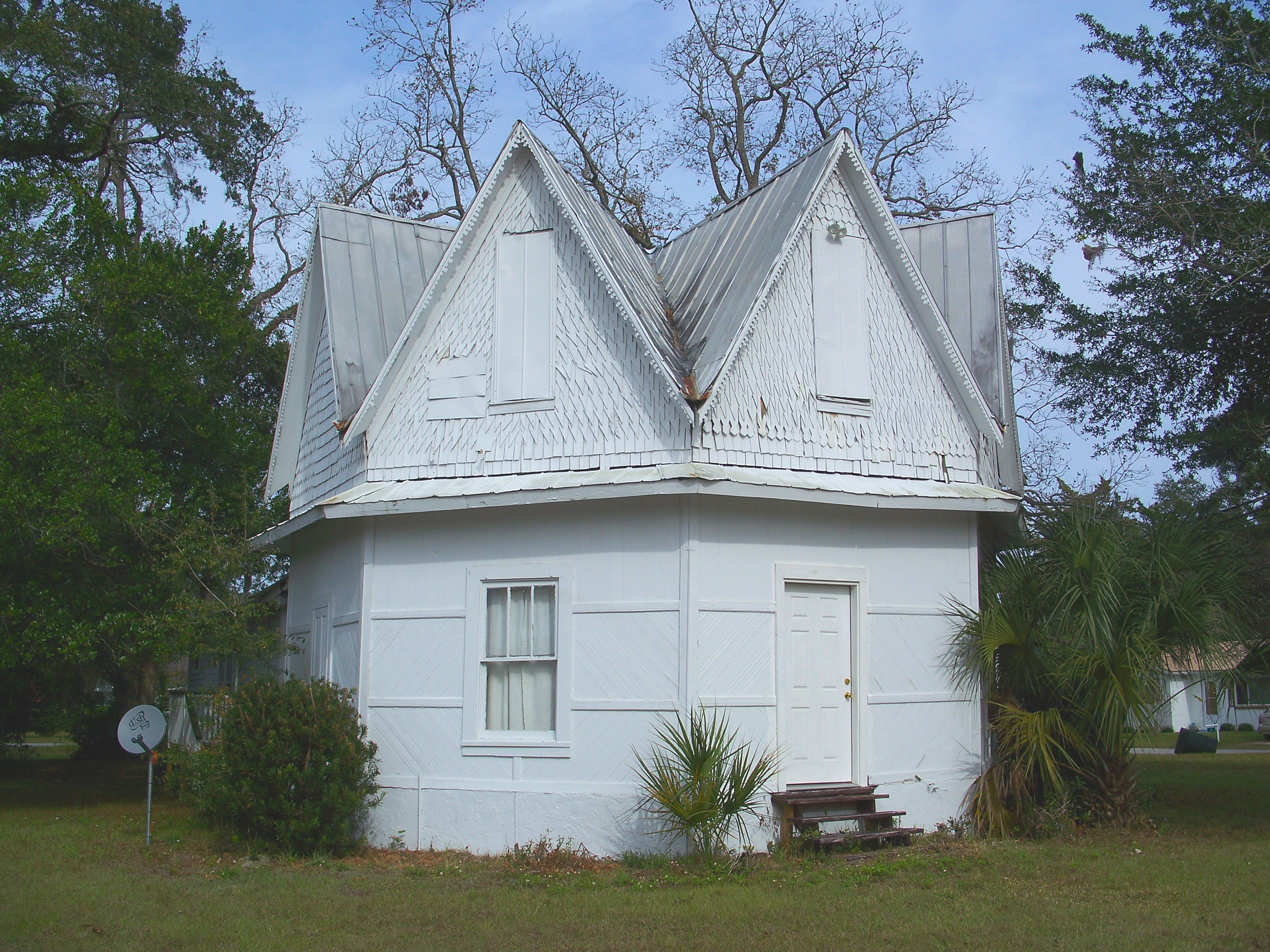

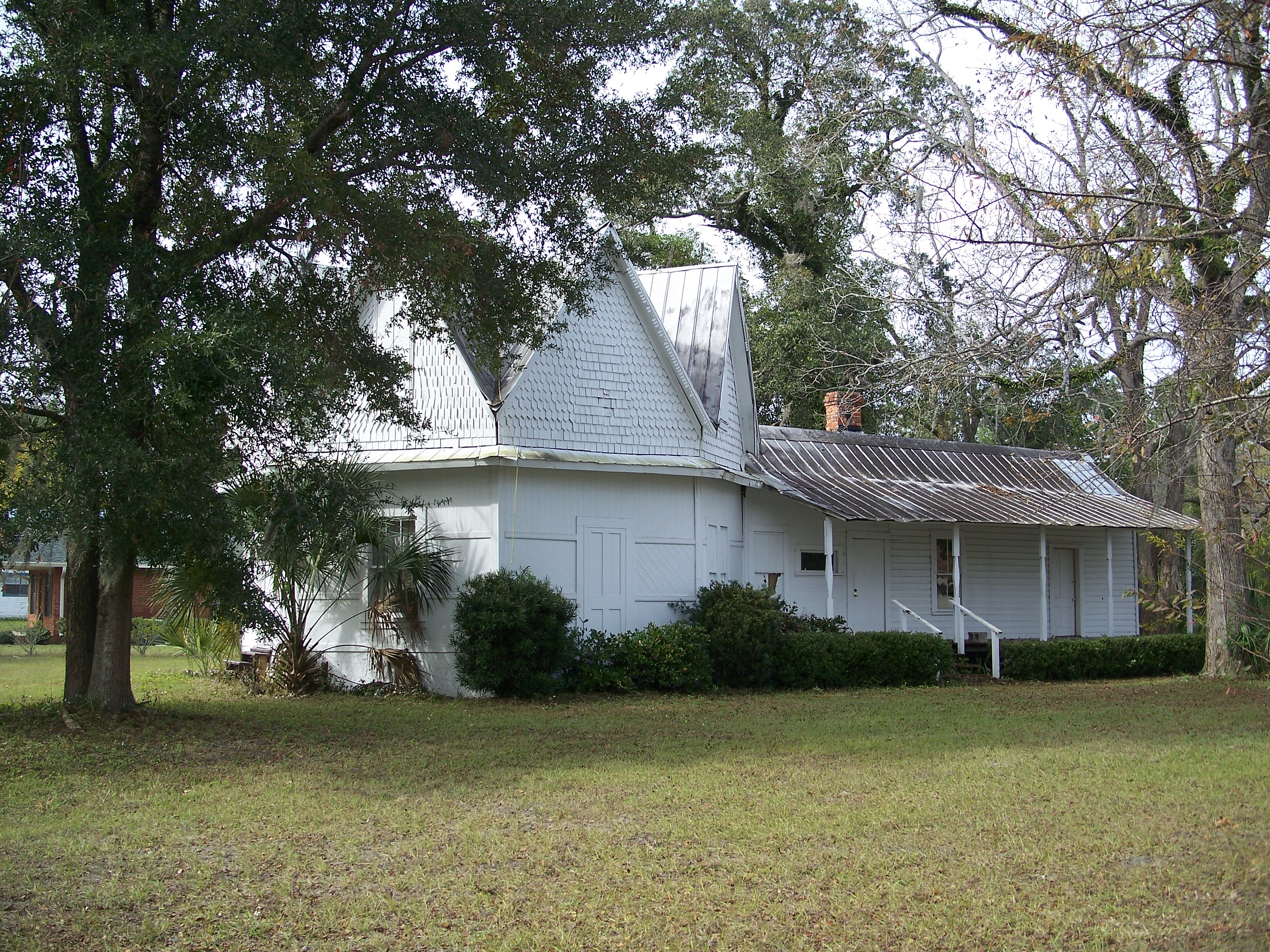

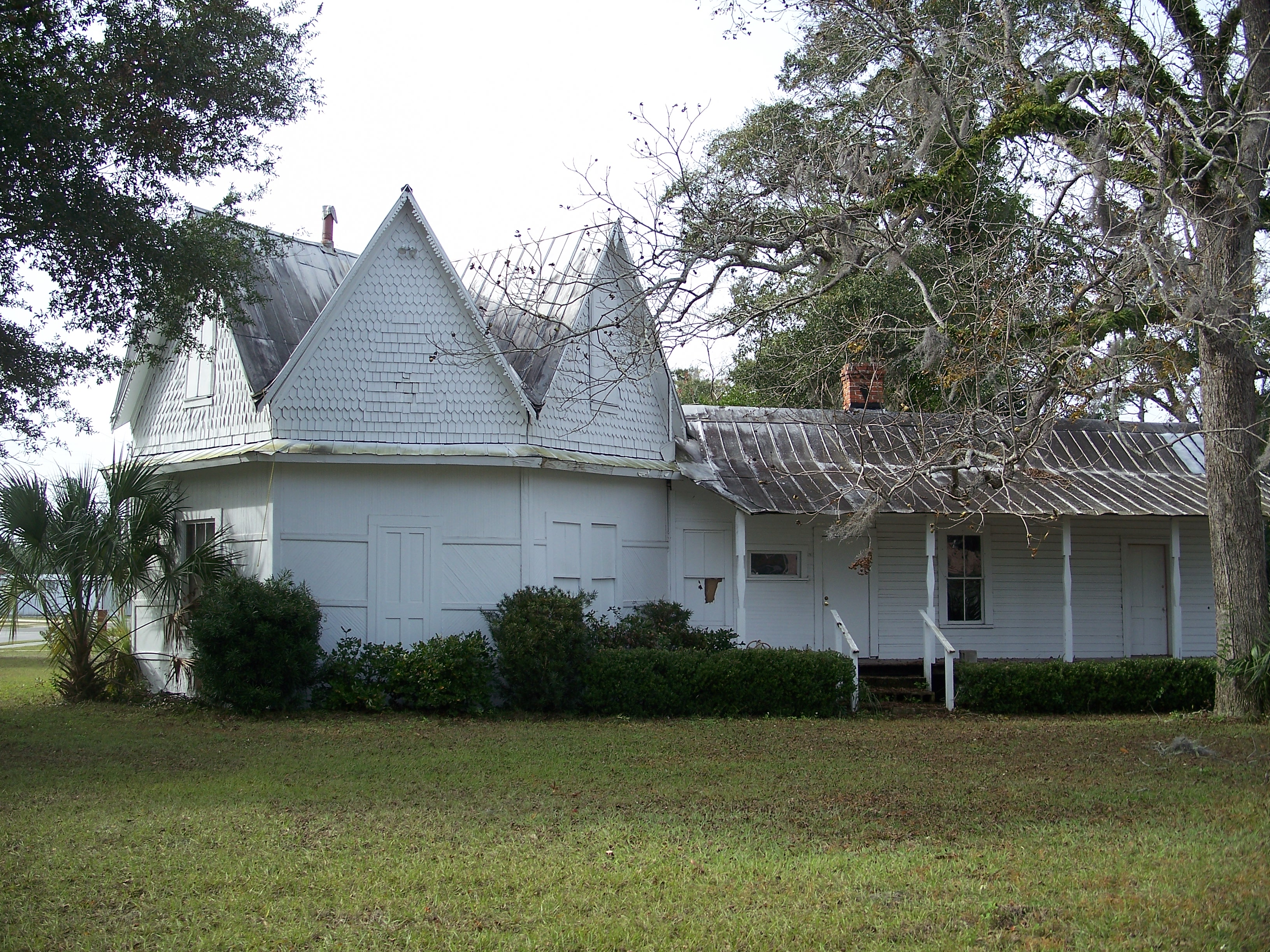

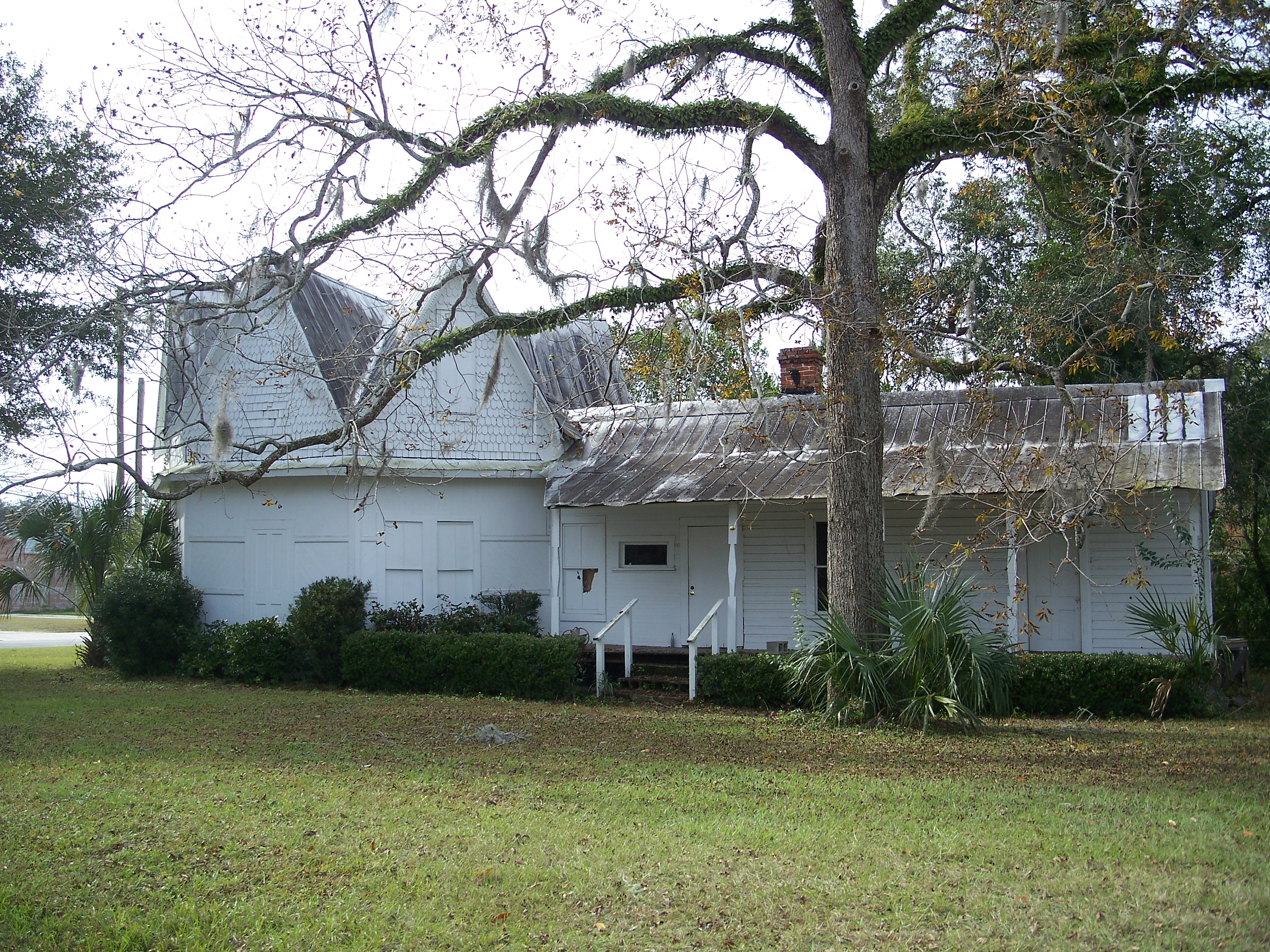

== See also ==
- List of octagon houses
- House of the Seven Gables in Salem, Massachusetts
