= Old Lafayette County Courthouse =

Historic former courthouse in Mayo, Florida

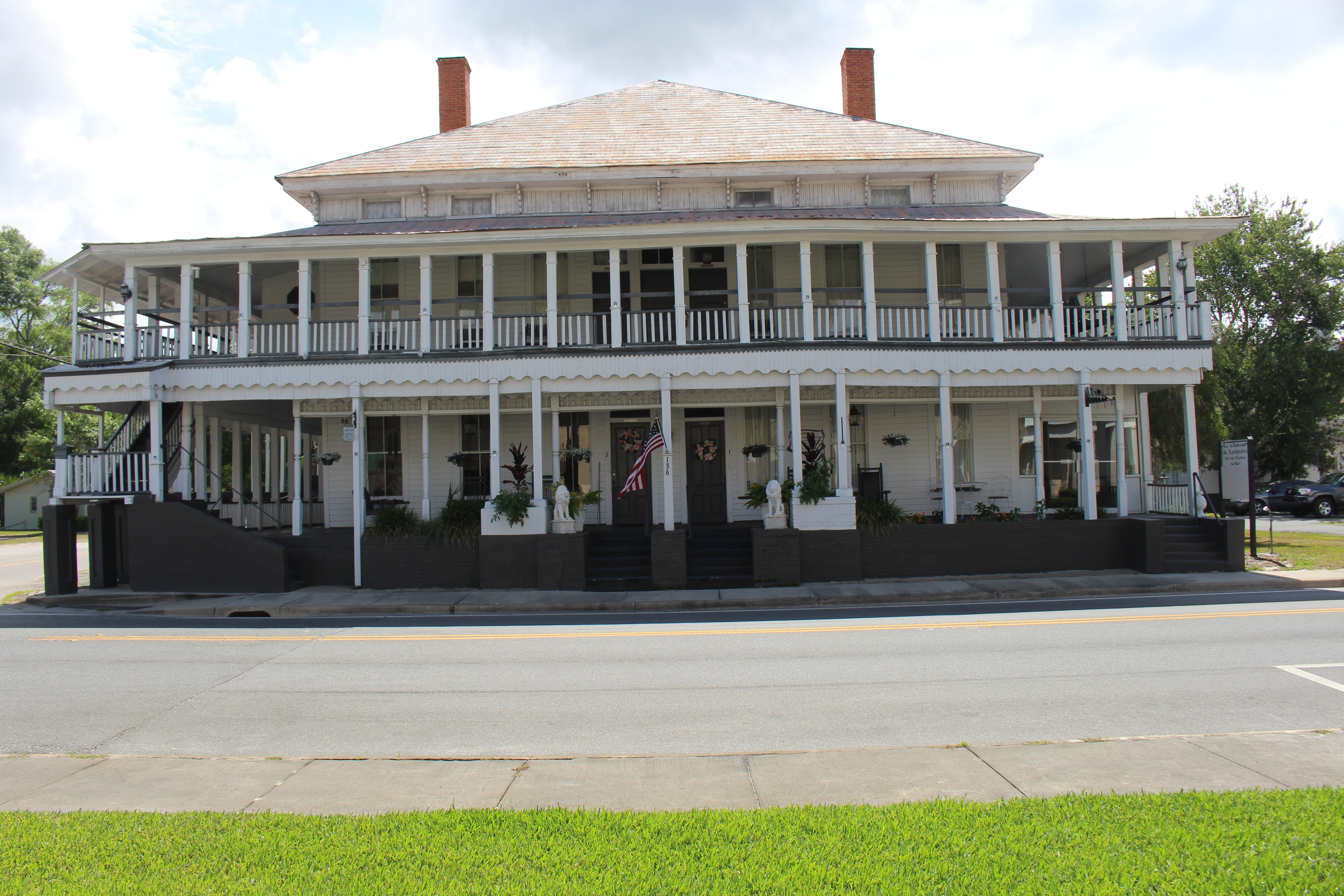
- Interactive map of the Old Lafayette County Courthouse area

General information
- Location: Mayo, Florida, United States
- Coordinates: 30.053575°N 83.175213°W
- Construction started: 1893
- Completed: 1894
- Client: Lafayette County

Technical details
- Structural system: wooden

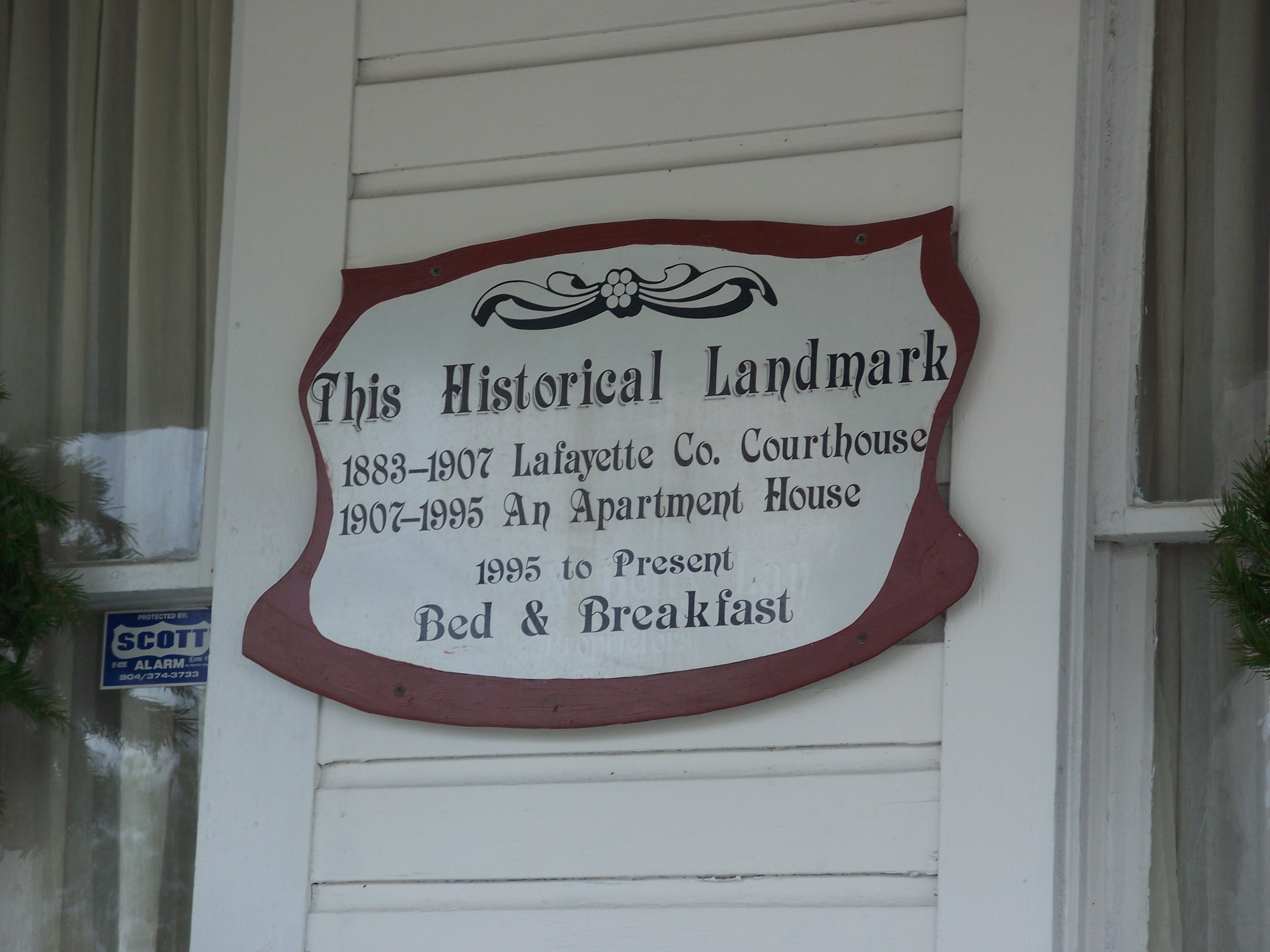
Old Courthouse Sign

The Old Lafayette County Courthouse, built 1893–1894, is an historic former courthouse building located on State Road 51 at 136 Fletcher Avenue, North, corner of Bloxham Street in Mayo, Florida, It was Lafayette County's second courthouse, the first at New Troy having burned down New Year's Eve 1892. It was built on the courthouse square in Mayo but was moved across the street to make way for a fireproof building, the present Lafayette County Courthouse. A two-story verandah was added on 3 sides after it was moved. In 1989, the Old Lafayette County Courthouse was listed in A Guide to Florida's Historic Architecture, published by the University of Florida Press. Today it is an inn called the Chateau.
