= Lafayette County Courthouse (Florida) =

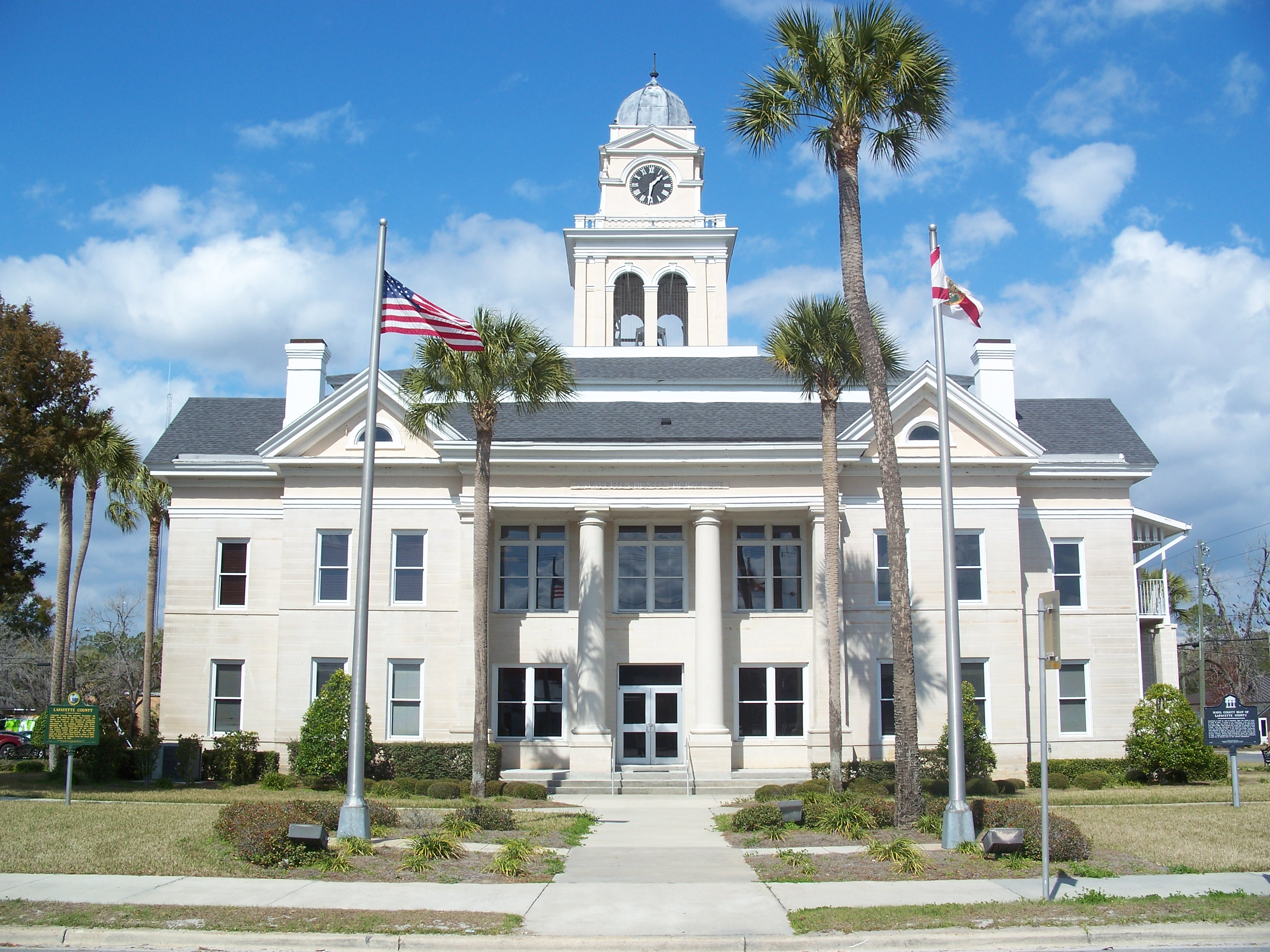
- Lafayette County Courthouse
- Interactive map of the Lafayette County Courthouse area

General information
- Architectural style: Neo-Classical
- Location: Mayo, Florida, United States
- Coordinates: 30.05302°N 83.175599°W
- Completed: 1908
- Cost: $47,000
- Client: Lafayette County

Design and construction
- Architect: Edward Columbus Hosford of Atlanta
- Engineer: Builder: Mutual Construction Company of Louisville, Kentucky

The Lafayette County Courthouse, built in 1908, is an historic courthouse building located in Mayo, Florida. It was designed by Atlanta-based architect Edward Columbus Hosford in the Classical Revival style, who designed other courthouses in Florida and other states. It was built of Indiana limestone by the Mutual Construction Company of Louisville, Kentucky. Because there was no railroad into Lafayette County, the limestone and other materials were shipped by rail to O'Brien in Suwannee, County and then transported by wagon to Mayo, crossing the Suwannee River via Grant's Ferry north of Troy Springs. It is Lafayette County's third courthouse, the first at New Troy having burned down New Year's Eve 1892 and the second wooden structure in Mayo having been moved across the street to make way for a fireproof building. In 1989, the Lafayette County Courthouse was listed in A Guide to Florida's Historic Architecture, published by the University of Florida Press.

== See also ==
- Old Lafayette County Courthouse
