= Mayo, Florida =

Town in the state of Florida, United States

- Town
- Town of Mayo
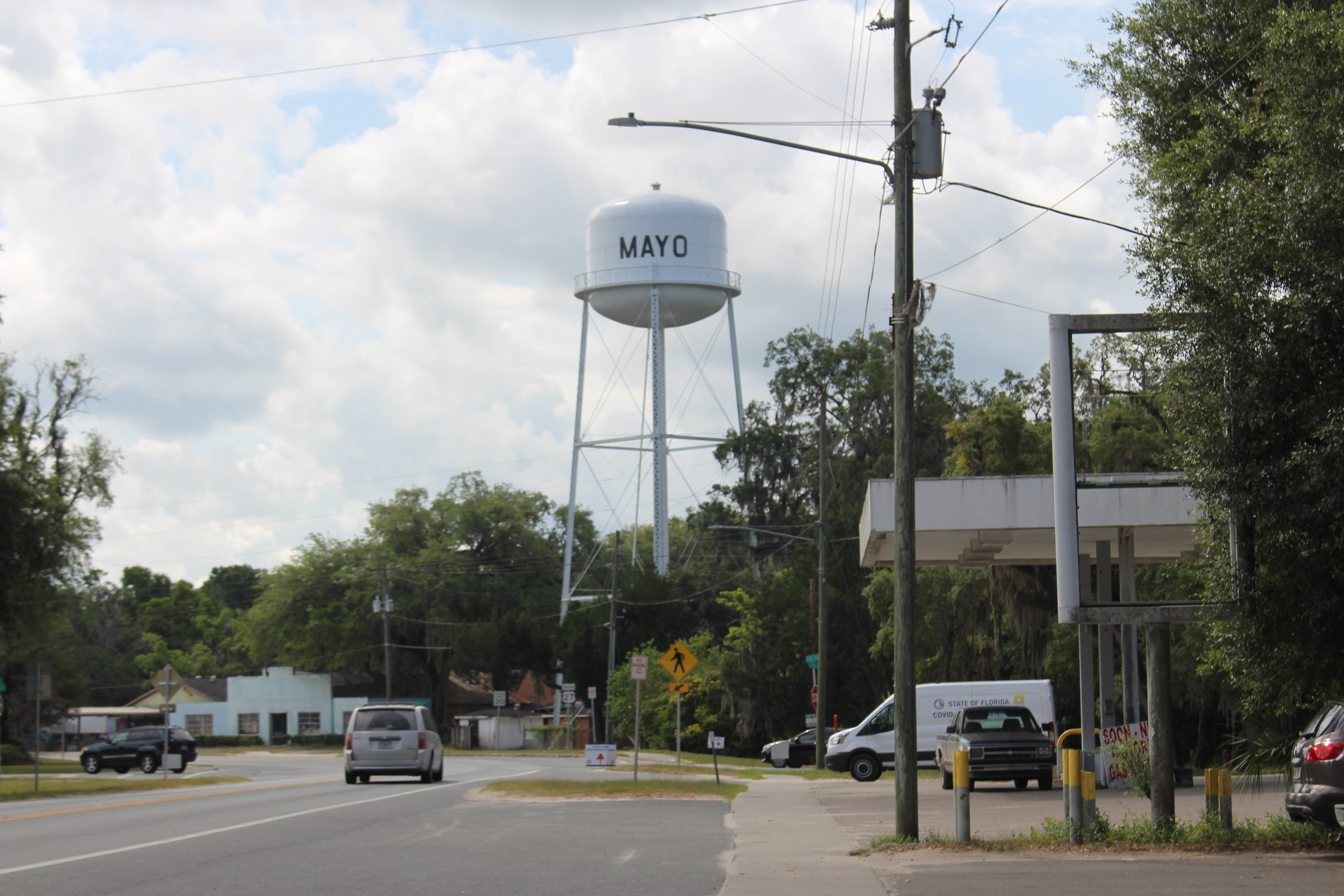
- Mayo water tower

- Location in Lafayette County and the state of Florida
- Coordinates: 30°03′04″N 83°10′37″W
- Country: United States
- State: Florida
- County: Lafayette
- Settled: 1874
- Incorporated: 1903

Government
  - Type: Mayor-Council
  - Mayor: Ann Murphy
  - Vice Mayor: Virginia McCray
  - Councilors: Wayne Hamlin, Mamie A. Thomas, and Jessica Lawson
  - Town Clerk: Janet Putnel
  - Town Attorney: Angela Ball

Area
  - Total: 0.90 sq mi (2.33 km^{2})
  - Land: 0.90 sq mi (2.33 km^{2})
  - Water: 0 sq mi (0.00 km^{2})
- Elevation: 75 ft (23 m)

Population (2020)
  - Total: 1,055
  - Density: 1,173.5/sq mi (453.08/km^{2})
- Time zone: UTC-5 (Eastern (EST))
  - Summer (DST): UTC-4 (EDT)
- ZIP code: 32066
- Area code: 386
- FIPS code: 12-43575
- GNIS feature ID: 2406115

Mayo, Florida is a town and the only municipality in Lafayette County, Florida, United States. It is the county seat of Lafayette County. The population was 1,055 at the 2020 census.

== History ==
Although the current Town of Mayo was settled and established in 1874 by John B. Whitfield, the town was not officially incorporated as a municipality until 1903. Whitfield decided to name the town after James M. Mayo, who was a colonel in the Confederate States Army.

An African American man named Charles Strong was lynched on January 17, 1922.

In August 2018, Mayo temporarily changed the town's name to "Miracle Whip" as an advertisement publicity stunt for the Kraft Heinz brand.

== Geography ==
According to the United States Census Bureau, the town has a total area of 2.1 km^{2} (0.81 sq mi), all land.

=== Climate ===
The climate in this area is characterized by hot, humid summers and generally mild winters. According to the Köppen climate classification, the Town of Mayo has a humid subtropical climate zone (Cfa).

Climate data for Mayo, Florida, 1991–2020 normals, extremes 1949–present
Month	Jan	Feb	Mar	Apr	May	Jun	Jul	Aug	Sep	Oct	Nov	Dec	Year
Record high °F (°C)	88 (31)	93 (34)	92 (33)	96 (36)	101 (38)	104 (40)	103 (39)	103 (39)	99 (37)	96 (36)	92 (33)	88 (31)	104 (40)
Mean maximum °F (°C)	80.3 (26.8)	82.7 (28.2)	85.8 (29.9)	89.4 (31.9)	94.5 (34.7)	97.1 (36.2)	97.6 (36.4)	96.8 (36.0)	94.9 (34.9)	90.6 (32.6)	85.9 (29.9)	81.8 (27.7)	98.7 (37.1)
Mean daily maximum °F (°C)	67.7 (19.8)	72.0 (22.2)	77.7 (25.4)	81.6 (27.6)	87.8 (31.0)	90.9 (32.7)	91.8 (33.2)	91.6 (33.1)	88.8 (31.6)	83.1 (28.4)	76.9 (24.9)	71.0 (21.7)	81.7 (27.6)
Daily mean °F (°C)	54.5 (12.5)	58.2 (14.6)	63.5 (17.5)	67.5 (19.7)	74.7 (23.7)	79.9 (26.6)	81.6 (27.6)	81.5 (27.5)	78.2 (25.7)	70.3 (21.3)	63.0 (17.2)	57.4 (14.1)	69.2 (20.7)
Mean daily minimum °F (°C)	41.3 (5.2)	44.4 (6.9)	49.4 (9.7)	53.3 (11.8)	61.6 (16.4)	68.9 (20.5)	71.4 (21.9)	71.4 (21.9)	67.7 (19.8)	57.6 (14.2)	49.1 (9.5)	43.8 (6.6)	56.7 (13.7)
Mean minimum °F (°C)	22.2 (−5.4)	25.3 (−3.7)	29.9 (−1.2)	39.2 (4.0)	48.4 (9.1)	60.6 (15.9)	66.0 (18.9)	66.2 (19.0)	58.4 (14.7)	40.5 (4.7)	29.8 (−1.2)	25.7 (−3.5)	20.4 (−6.4)
Record low °F (°C)	7 (−14)	12 (−11)	19 (−7)	31 (−1)	41 (5)	47 (8)	58 (14)	58 (14)	40 (4)	27 (−3)	19 (−7)	10 (−12)	7 (−14)
Average precipitation inches (mm)	4.66 (118)	3.40 (86)	4.24 (108)	3.09 (78)	3.11 (79)	7.58 (193)	7.56 (192)	8.11 (206)	5.39 (137)	3.07 (78)	2.04 (52)	3.33 (85)	55.58 (1,412)
Average precipitation days (≥ 0.01 in)	8.3	7.8	7.4	6.1	6.6	13.7	13.8	15.5	9.9	5.9	5.4	7.6	108.0
Source: NOAA

== Demographics ==
Historical population
Census	Pop.	Note	%±
1910	578		—
1920	531		−8.1%
1930	555		4.5%
1940	915		64.9%
1950	679		−25.8%
1960	687		1.2%
1970	793		15.4%
1980	891		12.4%
1990	917		2.9%
2000	988		7.7%
2010	1,237		25.2%
2020	1,055		−14.7%
U.S. Decennial Census

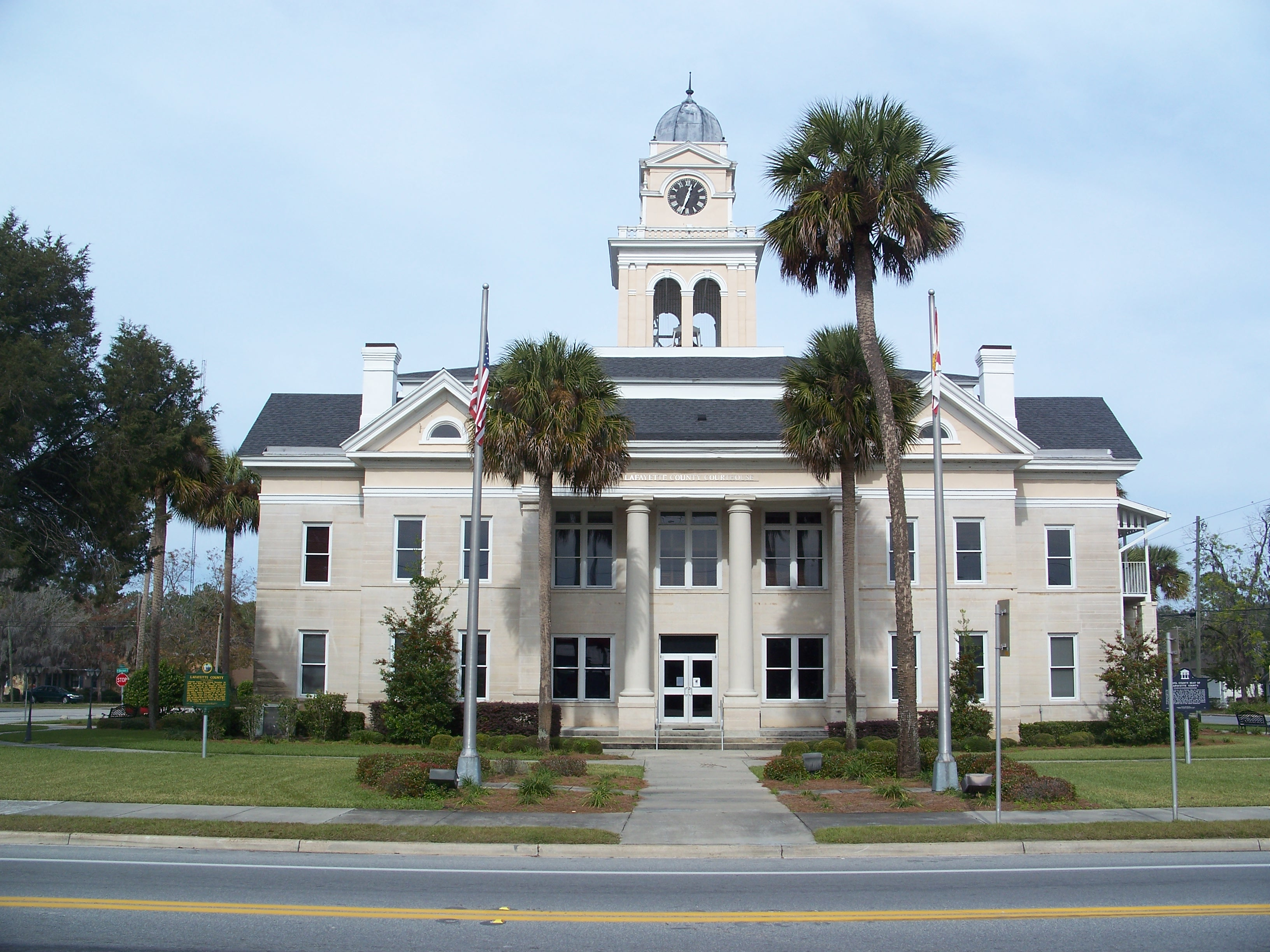
Lafayette County Courthouse

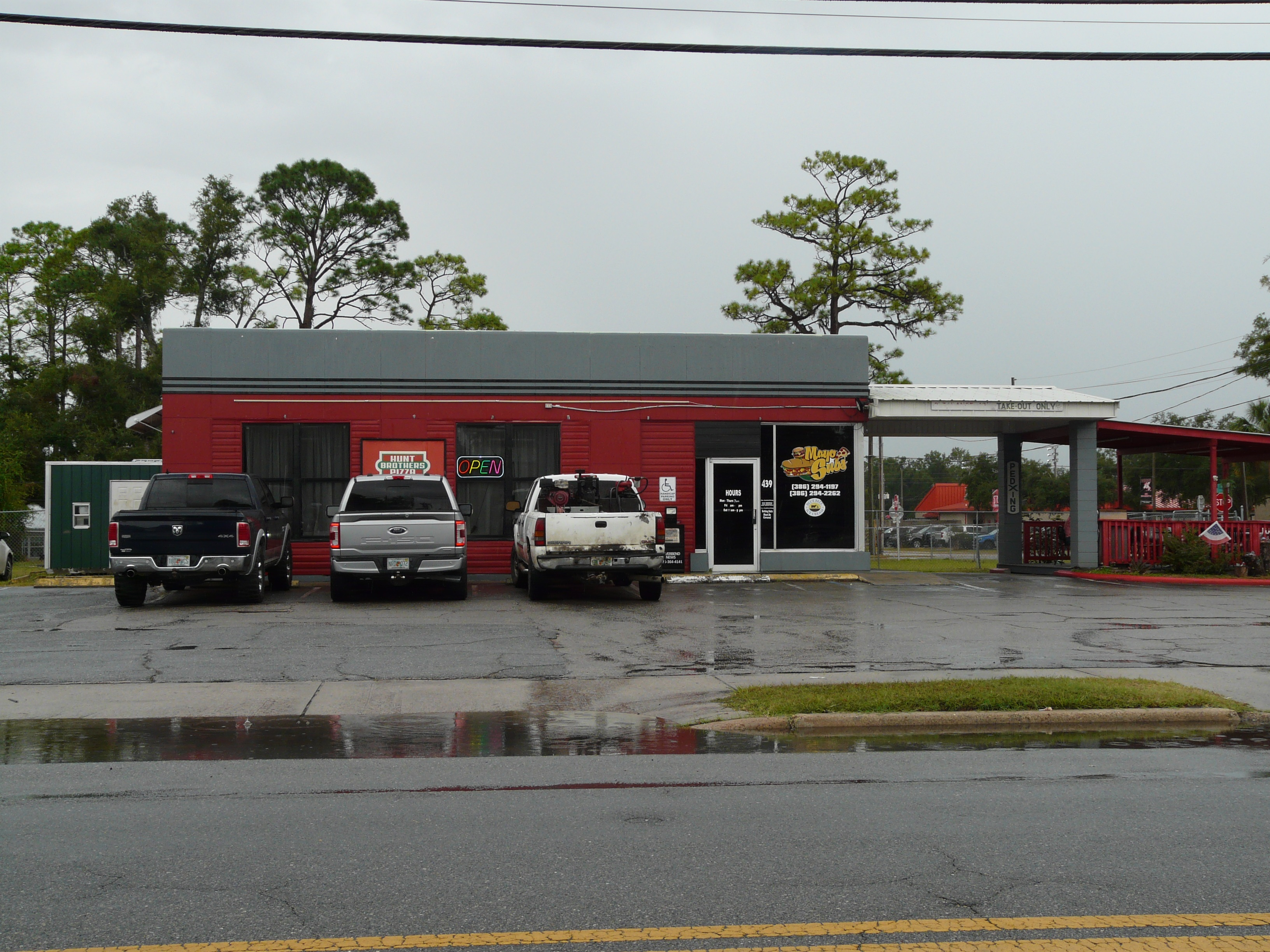
Mayo Subs restaurant

=== Racial and ethnic composition ===
Mayo racial composition (Hispanics excluded from racial categories) (NH = Non-Hispanic)
Race	Pop 2010	Pop 2020	% 2010	% 2020
White (NH)	687	583	55.54%	55.26%
Black or African American (NH)	303	266	24.49%	25.21%
Native American or Alaska Native (NH)	0	3	0.00%	0.28%
Asian (NH)	7	7	0.57%	0.66%
Pacific Islander or Native Hawaiian (NH)	0	1	0.00%	0.09%
Some other race (NH)	2	2	0.16%	0.19%
Two or more races/Multiracial (NH)	27	23	2.18%	2.18%
Hispanic or Latino (any race)	211	170	17.06%	16.11%
Total	1,237	1,055		

=== 2020 census ===
As of the 2020 census, Mayo had a population of 1,055. The median age was 47.1 years. 22.0% of residents were under the age of 18 and 27.2% of residents were 65 years of age or older. For every 100 females there were 85.4 males, and for every 100 females age 18 and over there were 79.7 males age 18 and over.

0.0% of residents lived in urban areas, while 100.0% lived in rural areas.

There were 359 households in Mayo, of which 33.1% had children under the age of 18 living in them. Of all households, 42.3% were married-couple households, 20.6% were households with a male householder and no spouse or partner present, and 32.6% were households with a female householder and no spouse or partner present. About 27.0% of all households were made up of individuals and 15.1% had someone living alone who was 65 years of age or older.

There were 406 housing units, of which 11.6% were vacant. The homeowner vacancy rate was 1.7% and the rental vacancy rate was 10.2%.

According to the American Community Survey 2020 five-year estimates, there were 211 families residing in the town.

=== 2010 census ===
As of the 2010 United States census, there were 1,237 people, 376 households, and 254 families residing in the town.

=== 2000 census ===
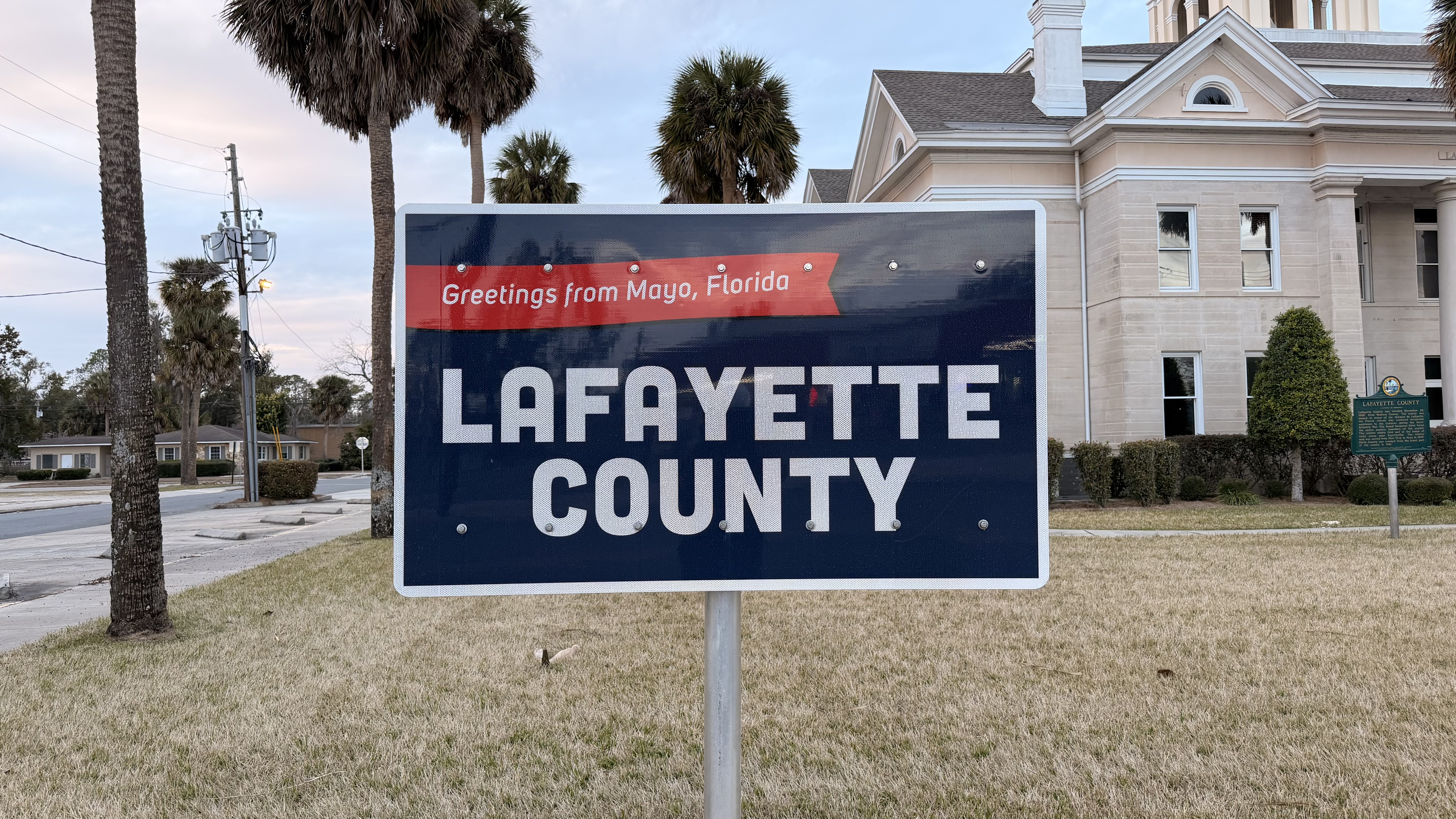
The front of the America250FL commemorative sign

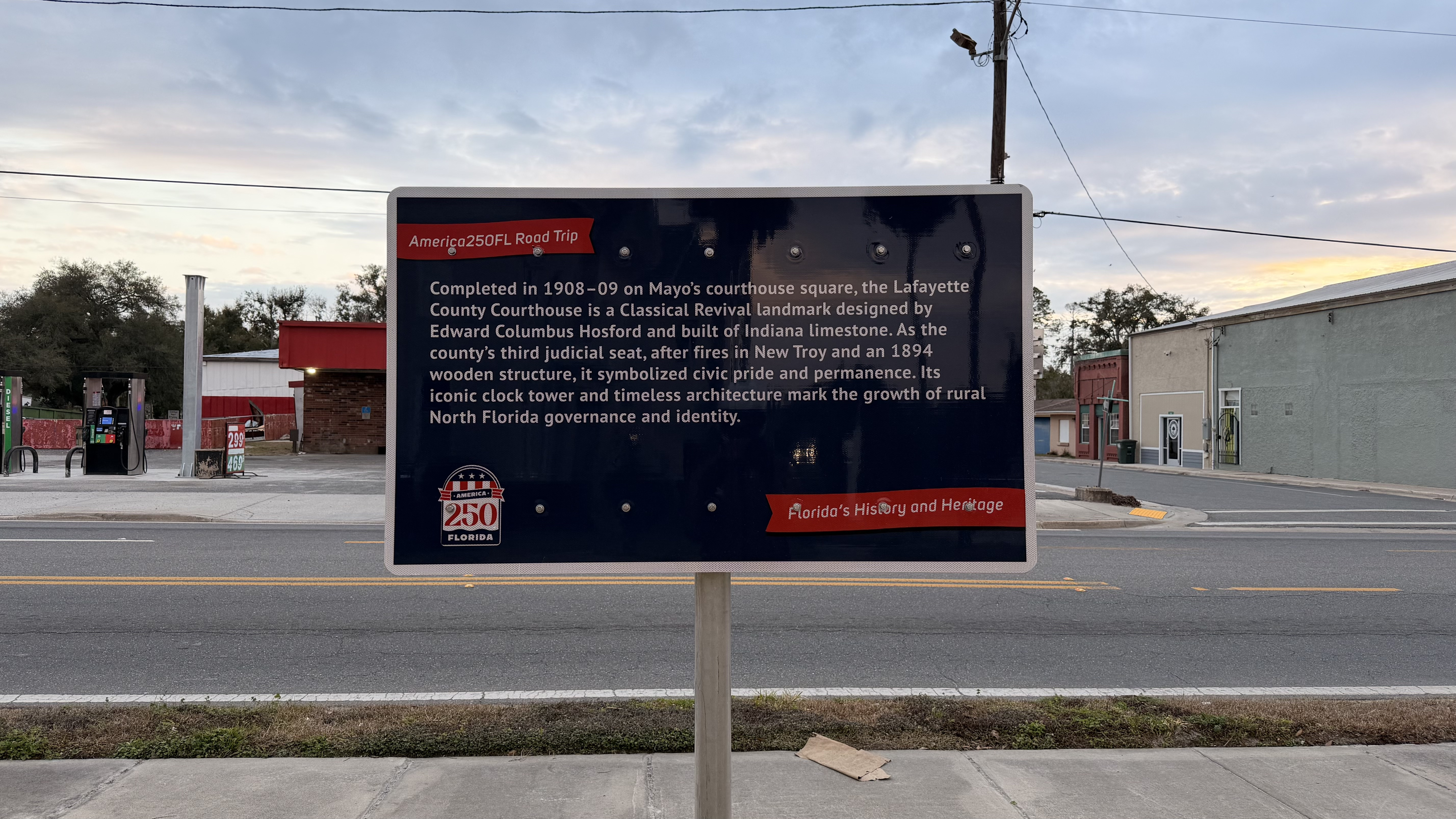
The back of the America250FL commemorative sign

As of the census of 2000, there were 988 people, 338 households, and 228 families residing in the town. The population density was 1,209.1 inhabitants per square mile (466.8/km^{2}). There were 365 housing units at an average density of 446.7 per square mile (172.5/km^{2}). The racial makeup of the town was 61.23% White, 27.43% African American, 0.40% Native American, 0.10% Pacific Islander, 9.62% from other races, and 1.21% from two or more races. Hispanic or Latino of any race were 16.80% of the population.

In 2000, there were 338 households, out of which 33.1% had children under the age of 18 living with them, 42.3% were married couples living together, 19.2% had a female householder with no husband present, and 32.5% were non-families. 28.4% of all households were made up of individuals, and 13.3% had someone living alone who was 65 years of age or older. The average household size was 2.70 and the average family size was 3.23.

In 2000, in the town, the population was spread out, with 28.2% under the age of 18, 11.1% from 18 to 24, 24.8% from 25 to 44, 21.7% from 45 to 64, and 14.2% who were 65 years of age or older. The median age was 33 years. For every 100 females, there were 96.0 males. For every 100 females age 18 and over, there were 92.1 males.

In 2000, the median income for a household in the town was $25,398, and the median income for a family was $28,438. Males had a median income of $21,802 versus $17,697 for females. The per capita income for the town was $13,298. About 30.6% of families and 34.6% of the population were below the poverty line, including 42.5% of those under age 18 and 54.7% of those age 65 or over.

== Education ==
Lafayette High School is in Mayo. Hornets are the mascot.

== Historic buildings and structures ==
Historic buildings and structures in Mayo include:

- The 1883 Old Lafayette County Courthouse, now a bed and breakfast;
- The 1888 Old Mayo Free Press Building, just south of the Old Courthouse;
- The 1908 Lafayette County Courthouse;
- The 1880s House of the Seven Gables and
- The 1915 M. Pico Building on the corner of Monroe and Main streets.

== Notable people ==
- Kerwin Bell, former NFL quarterback
- Bill Birchfield, lawyer, Florida state representative
- Reggie McGrew, former NFL defensive linesman
- Ricky Nattiel, former football player for the University of Florida and the Denver Broncos
- Herbert Perry, former college football player and MLB baseball player
- Charles Strong, was lynched on January 17, 1922, in Mayo
- Dan White, American actor

== Notes ==
- "Victim killed W.R. Taylor, son of a well known Naval Stores Operator last Saturday Night". The Pensacola Journal. Pensacola, Escambia, Florida: Mayes & Co. January 18, 1922. pp. 1–8. ISSN 1941-109X. OCLC 16280864.
