= National Register of Historic Places listings in Hamilton County, Florida =

Location of Hamilton County in Florida

This is a list of the National Register of Historic Places listings in Hamilton County, Florida.

This is intended to be a complete list of the properties and districts on the National Register of Historic Places in Hamilton County, Florida, United States. The locations of National Register properties and districts for which the latitude and longitude coordinates are included below, may be seen in a map.

There are 5 properties and districts listed on the National Register in the county.

This National Park Service list is complete through NPS recent listings posted March 21, 2025.

Contents: Counties in Florida (non-linked contain no National Register listings)
Alachua - Baker - Bay - Bradford - Brevard - Broward - Calhoun - Charlotte - Citrus - Clay - Collier - Columbia - DeSoto - Dixie - Duval - Escambia - Flagler - Franklin - Gadsden - Gilchrist - Glades - Gulf - Hamilton - Hardee - Hendry - Hernando - Highlands - Hillsborough (Tampa) - Holmes - Indian River - Jackson - Jefferson - Lafayette - Lake - Lee - Leon - Levy - Liberty - Madison - Manatee - Marion - Martin - Miami-Dade (Miami) - Monroe - Nassau - Okaloosa - Okeechobee - Orange - Osceola - Palm Beach - Pasco - Pinellas - Polk - Putnam - St. Johns - St. Lucie - Santa Rosa - Sarasota - Seminole - Sumter - Suwannee - Taylor - Union - Volusia - Wakulla - Walton - Washington

== Current listings ==
	Name on the Register	Image	Date listed	Location	City or town	Description
1	Jennings High School	Jennings High School	January 10, 2008 (#07001357)	1291 Florida Street; 30°36′01″N 83°05′58″W	Jennings	
2	Johns House	Johns House	July 9, 1998 (#98000835)	Junction of State Road 135 and Adams Memorial Drive; 30°19′59″N 82°44′54″W	White Springs	
3	Old Hamilton County Jail	Old Hamilton County Jail	July 7, 1983 (#83001423)	501 Northeast 1st Avenue; 30°31′16″N 82°56′46″W	Jasper	
4	United Methodist Church	United Methodist Church	September 29, 1978 (#78000943)	Central Avenue and 5th Street; 30°30′53″N 82°56′52″W	Jasper	
5	White Springs Historic District	White Springs Historic District	September 19, 1997 (#97001143)	Roughly bounded by River, First, Suwannee, and Hewitt Streets, State Road 25A, U.S. Route 41, and the Suwannee River; 30°19′59″N 82°45′45″W	White Springs	

== Former listing ==
	Name on the Register	Image	Date listed	Date removed	Location	City or town	Description
1	Spring House	Spring House	May 3, 1974 (#74002325)	1974	Suwannee River at Spring St.	White Springs	Demolished in 1973.

== See also ==
- List of National Historic Landmarks in Florida
- National Register of Historic Places listings in Florida
