= Jennings High School =

Jennings High School may refer to:

- Jennings High School (Jennings, Florida) in Jennings, Florida
- Jennings High School (Kansas) in Jennings, Kansas
- Jennings High School (Louisiana) in Jennings, Louisiana
- Jennings High School (Missouri) in Jennings, Missouri
