= Florida State Road 143 =

State highway in Florida, United States

State Road 143
- Florida State Road 143 highlighted in red

Route information
- Maintained by FDOT
- Length: 1.569 mi (2.525 km)

Major junctions
- South end: I-75 in Jennings
- North end: US 41 / CR 141 in Jennings

Location
- Country: United States
- State: Florida

Highway system
- Florida State Highway System; Interstate; US; State; Former; Pre‑1945; Toll; Scenic
← SR 139	→ SR 145

State Road 143 (SR 143) is a north–south route in Jennings, Hamilton County, Florida, running from I-75 to US 41.

South of I-75, County Road 143 continues through SR 6 at Blue Springs toward CR 141 near Twin Rivers State Forest.

At its northern terminus with US 41, SR 143 connects with County Road 141, which goes north to the Georgia border, becoming State Route 135.

== Major intersections ==
The entire route is in Jennings, Hamilton County.

mi	km	Destinations	Notes
0.000	0.000	west end of state maintenance	
0.21	0.34	I-75 (SR 93) – Valdosta, Lake City	I-75 exit 467
1.569	2.525	US 41 (Plum Street / Scenic Route / SR 25) / CR 141 north (Hamilton Avenue)	
1.000 mi = 1.609 km; 1.000 km = 0.621 mi
