= Hamilton County, Florida =

County in Florida, United States

- County
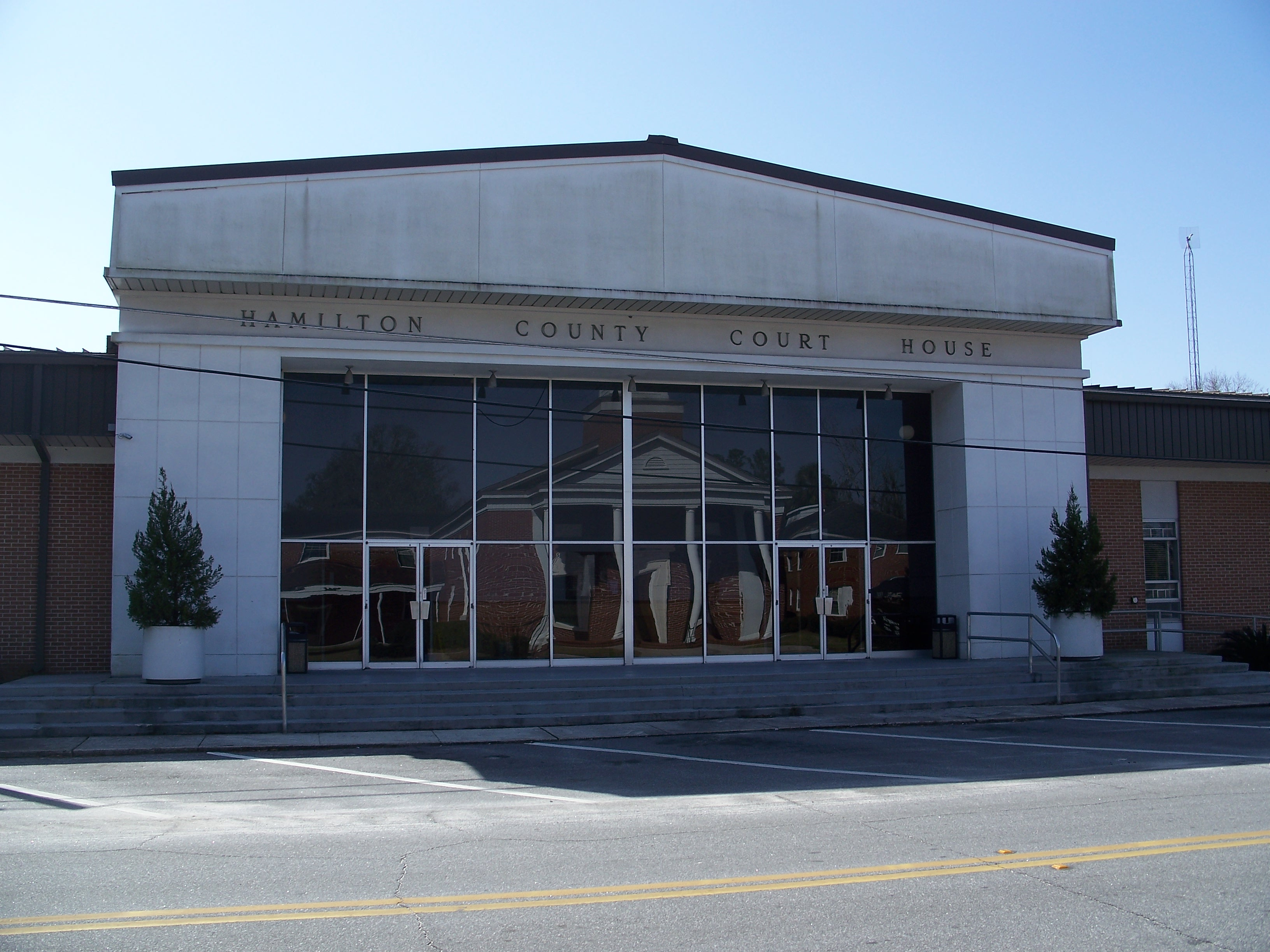
- Hamilton County Courthouse in Jasper

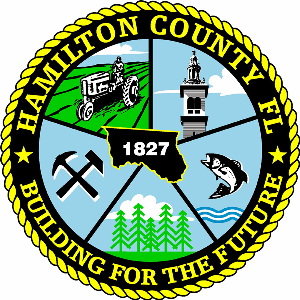
- Seal

- Location within the U.S. state of Florida
- Coordinates: 30°29′N 82°57′W
- Country: United States
- State: Florida
- Founded: December 26, 1827
- Named for: Alexander Hamilton
- Seat: Jasper
- Largest city: Jasper

Area
  - Total: 519 sq mi (1,340 km^{2})
  - Land: 514 sq mi (1,330 km^{2})
  - Water: 5.3 sq mi (14 km^{2}) 1.0%

Population (2020)
  - Total: 14,004
  - Estimate (2025): 14,180 ▲
  - Density: 27.2/sq mi (10.5/km^{2})
- Time zone: UTC−5 (Eastern)
  - Summer (DST): UTC−4 (EDT)
- Congressional district: 3rd
- Website: www.hamiltoncountyfl.com

Hamilton County is a county located in the north central portion of the U.S. state of Florida. As of the 2020 census, the population was 14,004, down from 14,799 at the 2010 census. Its county seat is Jasper.

== History ==
Hamilton County was created in 1827 from portions of Jefferson County. It was named for Alexander Hamilton, first United States Secretary of the Treasury.

== Geography ==
According to the U.S. Census Bureau, the county has a total area of 519 square miles (1,340 km^{2}), of which 514 square miles (1,330 km^{2}) is land and 5.3 square miles (14 km^{2}) (1.0%) is water. It is the only county in Florida entirely north of Interstate 10.

Hamilton County is the only county in Florida that is not connected to Florida by land. This is due to it being separated from neighboring Florida counties by river (the Suwannee and the Withlacoochee rivers). It does, however, touch Georgia via land.

=== Adjacent counties ===
- Echols County, Georgia - north
- Columbia County - east
- Suwannee County - south
- Madison County - west
- Lowndes County, Georgia - northwest

=== Major Highway ===
- I-75 (Interstate 75 / SR 93)
- US 41 (SR 25)
- US 129 (SRs 51 / 100)
- SR 6
- SR 100
- SR 136
- CR 143 / SR 143 (Hamilton Avenue)

=== Railroads ===
The main railroad line through Hamilton County is the Norfolk Southern Railway's Navair District (originally the Georgia Southern and Florida Railway), which runs mostly in close proximity to US 41 from Lake City across a bridge over the Suwannee River and the Columbia-Hamilton County Line southeast of White Plains to the Florida-Georgia State Line northwest of Jennings. A former section of the Atlantic Coast Line Railroad's DuPont—Lakeland Line survives as a rail trail in Jasper.

== Demographics ==
Historical population
Census	Pop.	Note	%±
1830	553		—
1840	1,464		164.7%
1850	2,511		71.5%
1860	4,154		65.4%
1870	5,749		38.4%
1880	6,790		18.1%
1890	8,507		25.3%
1900	11,881		39.7%
1910	11,825		−0.5%
1920	9,873		−16.5%
1930	9,454		−4.2%
1940	9,778		3.4%
1950	8,981		−8.2%
1960	7,705		−14.2%
1970	7,787		1.1%
1980	8,761		12.5%
1990	10,930		24.8%
2000	13,327		21.9%
2010	14,799		11.0%
2020	14,004		−5.4%
2025 (est.)	14,180	▲	1.3%
U.S. Decennial Census; 1790-1960 1900-1990; 1990-2000 2010-2019

=== 2020 census ===
As of the 2020 census, the Hamilton County had a population of 14,004. There were 4,690 households and 3,072 families. The population density was 27.2 per square mile (10.5/km^{2}). There were 5,596 housing units at an average density of 10.9 per square mile (4.2/km^{2}).

The median age was 43.0 years; 19.1% of residents were under the age of 18, 7.0% were from 18 to 24, 26.4% were from 25 to 44, 28.6% were from 45 to 64, and 18.9% were 65 years of age or older. For every 100 females there were 136.2 males, and for every 100 females age 18 and over there were 143.2 males age 18 and over.

The racial makeup was 57.33% (8,028) white or European American (54.51% non-Hispanic white), 31.97% (4,477) black or African-American, 0.41% (58) Native American or Alaska Native, 0.31% (43) Asian, 0.0% (0) Pacific Islander or Native Hawaiian, 5.06% (709) from other races, and 4.92% (689) from two or more races. Hispanic or Latino of any race was 10.39% (1,455) of the population.

<0.1% of residents lived in urban areas, while 100.0% lived in rural areas.

Of the 4,690 households, 29.1% had children under the age of 18 living in them, 41.2% were married-couple households, 21.4% were households with a male householder and no spouse or partner present, and 31.2% were households with a female householder and no spouse or partner present. About 29.3% of all households were made up of individuals and 14.7% had someone living alone who was 65 years of age or older.

There were 5,596 housing units, of which 16.2% were vacant. Among occupied housing units, 72.9% were owner-occupied and 27.1% were renter-occupied. The homeowner vacancy rate was 1.8% and the rental vacancy rate was 8.1%.

=== Racial and ethnic composition ===
Hamilton County, Florida – Racial and ethnic composition Note: the US Census treats Hispanic/Latino as an ethnic category. This table excludes Latinos from the racial categories and assigns them to a separate category. Hispanics/Latinos may be of any race.
Race / Ethnicity (NH = Non-Hispanic)	Pop 1980	Pop 1990	Pop 2000	Pop 2010	Pop 2020	% 1980	% 1990	% 2000	% 2010	% 2020
White alone (NH)	5,398	6,356	7,336	8,124	7,633	61.61%	58.15%	55.05%	54.90%	54.51%
Black or African American alone (NH)	3,271	4,219	4,967	5,038	4,422	37.34%	38.60%	37.27%	34.04%	31.58%
Native American or Alaska Native alone (NH)	16	42	43	70	43	0.18%	0.38%	0.32%	0.47%	0.31%
Asian alone (NH)	15	17	26	73	43	0.17%	0.16%	0.20%	0.49%	0.31%
Native Hawaiian or Pacific Islander alone (NH)	x	x	1	0	0	x	x	0.01%	0.00%	0.00%
Other race alone (NH)	0	1	7	13	26	0.00%	0.01%	0.05%	0.09%	0.19%
Mixed race or Multiracial (NH)	x	x	100	175	382	x	x	0.75%	1.18%	2.73%
Hispanic or Latino (any race)	61	295	847	1,306	1,455	0.70%	2.70%	6.36%	8.82%	10.39%
Total	8,761	10,930	13,327	14,799	14,004	100.00%	100.00%	100.00%	100.00%	100.00%

A map of racial demographics in Hamilton County by Census tract Legend: Non-Hispanic White 40–50% 60–70% 70–80% 80–90% Black or African American 50–60%

=== 2020 ACS estimates ===
The average household size was 2.5 and the average family size was 2.9. The percent of those with a bachelor's degree or higher was estimated to be 6.4% of the population.

The 2016–2020 5-year American Community Survey estimates show that the median household income was $38,300 (with a margin of error of +/- $6,178). The median family income was $44,231 (+/- $6,593). Males had a median income of $24,556 (+/- $4,009) versus $22,406 (+/- $1,882) for females. The median income for those above 16 years old was $23,110 (+/- $2,444). Approximately, 20.3% of families and 25.7% of the population were below the poverty line, including 33.2% of those under the age of 18 and 19.0% of those ages 65 or over.

=== 2000 census ===
As of the census of 2000, there were 13,327 people, 4,161 households, and 2,995 families residing in the county. The population density was 26 people per square mile (10 people/km^{2}). There were 4,966 housing units at an average density of 10 per square mile (3.9/km^{2}). The racial makeup of the county was 58.79% White, 37.72% Black or African American, 0.42% Native American, 0.20% Asian, 0.02% Pacific Islander, 1.69% from other races, and 1.17% from two or more races. 6.36% of the population were Hispanic or Latino of any race.

There were 4,161 households, out of which 32.90% had children under the age of 18 living with them, 50.30% were married couples living together, 16.80% had a female householder with no husband present, and 28.00% were non-families. 24.10% of all households were made up of individuals, and 9.10% had someone living alone who was 65 years of age or older. The average household size was 2.60 and the average family size was 3.07.

In the county, the population was spread out, with 23.50% under the age of 18, 10.80% from 18 to 24, 31.80% from 25 to 44, 22.80% from 45 to 64, and 11.20% who were 65 years of age or older. The median age was 35 years. For every 100 females there were 135.00 males. For every 100 females age 18 and over, there were 145.40 males.

The median income for a household in the county was $25,638, and the median income for a family was $30,677. Males had a median income of $26,999 versus $20,552 for females. The per capita income for the county was $10,562. About 21.70% of families and 26.00% of the population were below the poverty line, including 35.70% of those under age 18 and 16.10% of those age 65 or over.

== Education ==
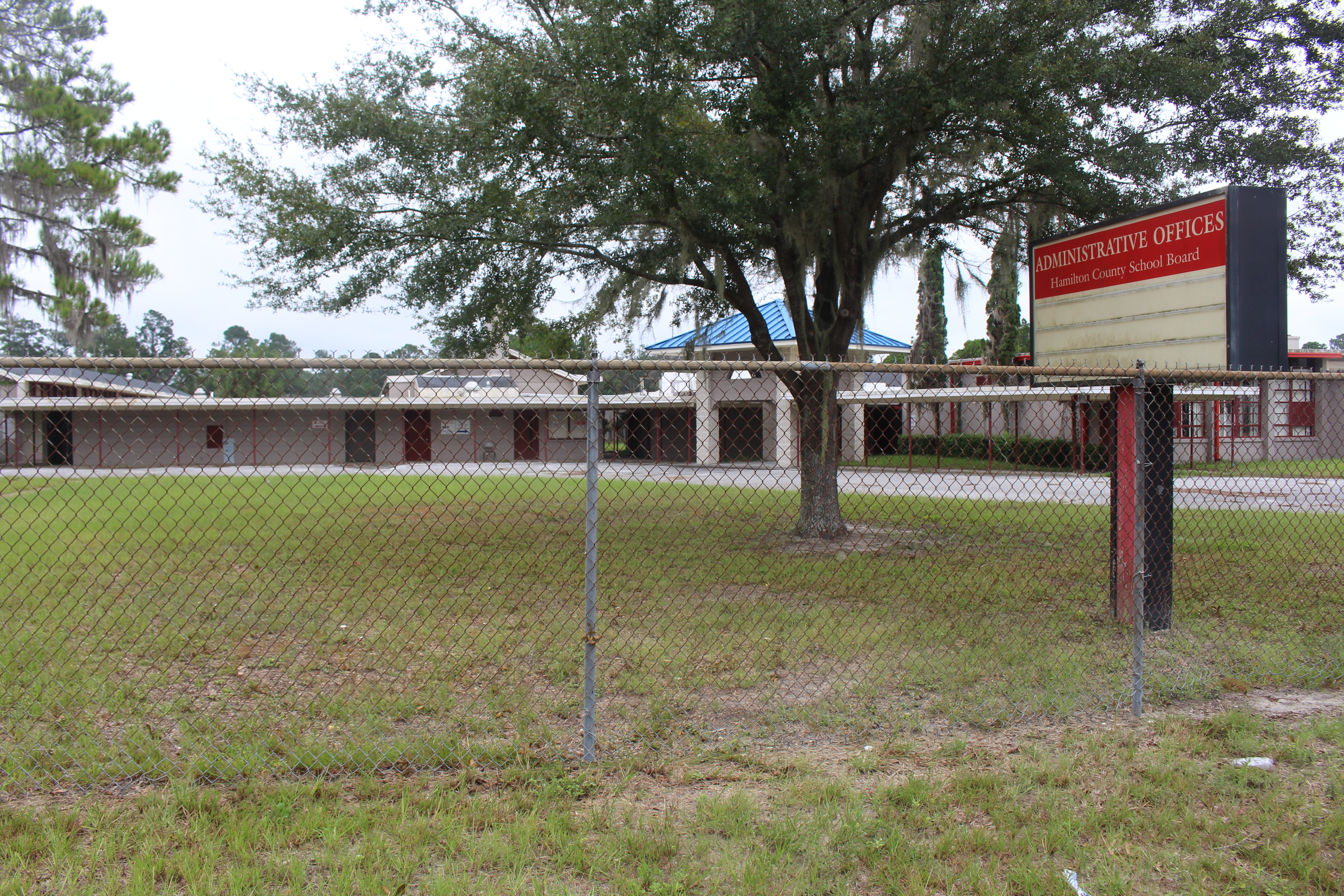
Hamilton County School District administrative offices

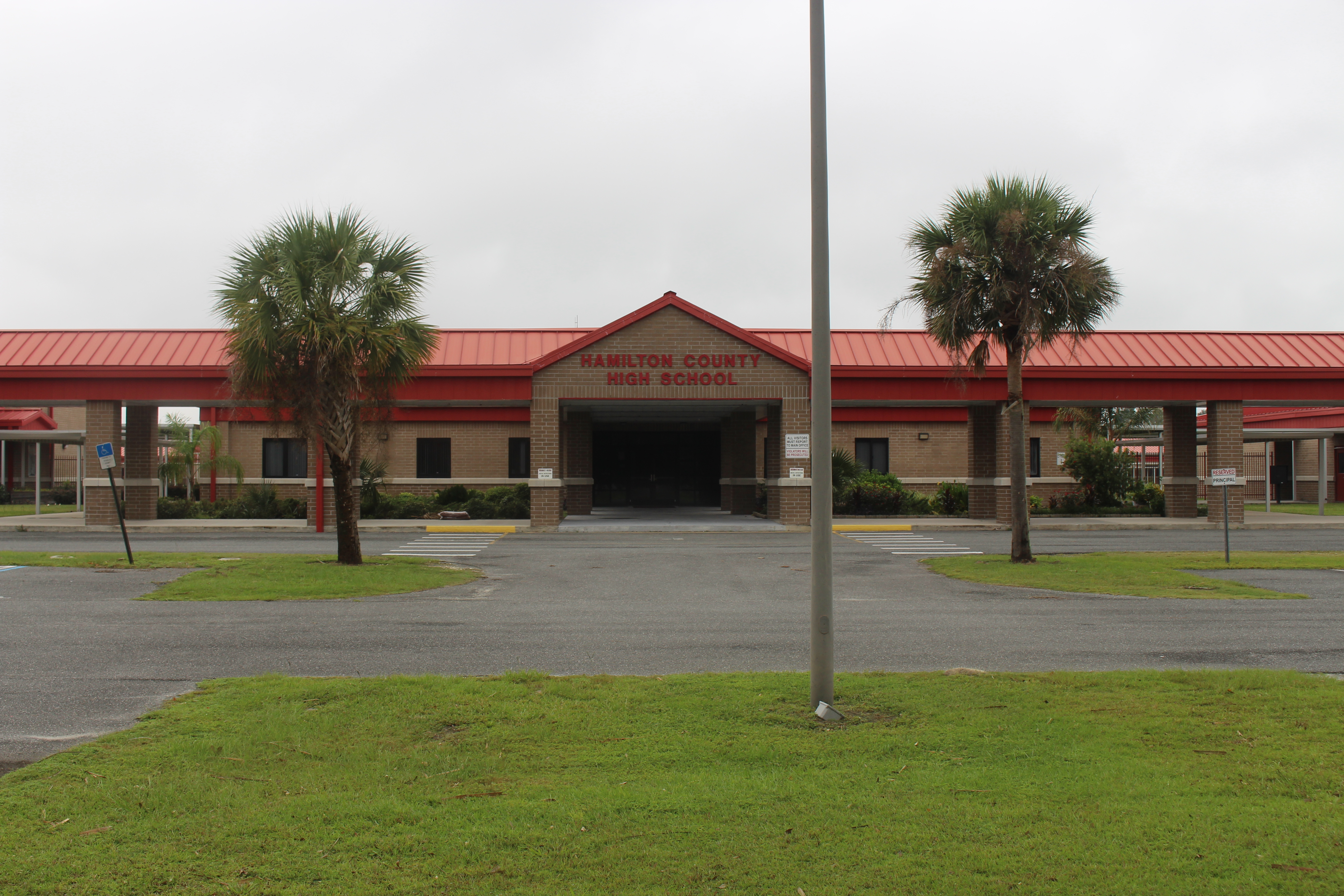
Hamilton County High School

Hamilton County School District operates public schools in the county. The sole elementary school is Hamilton County Elementary School, and the sole high school is Hamilton County High School.

Hamilton County is served by the Suwannee River Regional Library System, which contains eight branches and also serves Madison and Suwannee counties.

Libraries in Hamilton County include:

- Jasper
- Jennings
- White Springs

== Communities ==
=== City ===
- Jasper

=== Towns ===
- Jennings
- White Springs

=== Unincorporated communities ===
- Avoca
- Bakers Mill
- Bellville
- Blue Springs
- Crossroads
- Hillcoat
- Marion
- Rawls
- Watson
- West Lake

== Politics ==
=== Voter registration ===
United States presidential election results for Hamilton County, Florida
Year	Republican		Democratic		Third party(ies)	
Year	No.	%	No.	%	No.	%
1904	155	24.53%	455	71.99%	22	3.48%
1908	116	16.38%	452	63.84%	140	19.77%
1912	46	8.26%	405	72.71%	106	19.03%
1916	113	13.92%	675	83.13%	24	2.96%
1920	151	15.91%	706	74.39%	92	9.69%
1924	143	17.40%	619	75.30%	60	7.30%
1928	167	16.83%	741	74.70%	84	8.47%
1932	110	8.65%	1,161	91.35%	0	0.00%
1936	73	4.49%	1,554	95.51%	0	0.00%
1940	185	11.50%	1,424	88.50%	0	0.00%
1944	262	17.92%	1,200	82.08%	0	0.00%
1948	202	12.53%	1,071	66.44%	339	21.03%
1952	658	31.18%	1,452	68.82%	0	0.00%
1956	464	23.71%	1,493	76.29%	0	0.00%
1960	656	33.01%	1,331	66.99%	0	0.00%
1964	1,158	47.07%	1,302	52.93%	0	0.00%
1968	337	12.34%	820	30.03%	1,574	57.63%
1972	1,741	73.34%	626	26.37%	7	0.29%
1976	794	26.91%	2,053	69.57%	104	3.52%
1980	1,301	39.66%	1,923	58.63%	56	1.71%
1984	1,921	57.83%	1,401	42.17%	0	0.00%
1988	2,062	60.72%	1,318	38.81%	16	0.47%
1992	1,402	37.64%	1,622	43.54%	701	18.82%
1996	1,520	41.38%	1,735	47.24%	418	11.38%
2000	2,147	54.14%	1,723	43.44%	96	2.42%
2004	2,792	54.97%	2,260	44.50%	27	0.53%
2008	3,179	56.81%	2,364	42.24%	53	0.95%
2012	3,138	57.90%	2,228	41.11%	54	1.00%
2016	3,443	62.70%	1,904	34.67%	144	2.62%
2020	3,815	65.33%	1,963	33.61%	62	1.06%
2024	3,964	68.92%	1,727	30.02%	61	1.06%

United States Senate election results for Hamilton County, Florida1
Year	Republican		Democratic		Third party(ies)	
Year	No.	%	No.	%	No.	%
2024	3,945	69.70%	1,602	28.30%	113	2.00%

United States Senate election results for Hamilton County, Florida3
Year	Republican		Democratic		Third party(ies)	
Year	No.	%	No.	%	No.	%
2022	3,030	70.73%	1,215	28.36%	39	0.91%

Florida Gubernatorial election results for Hamilton County
Year	Republican		Democratic		Third party(ies)	
Year	No.	%	No.	%	No.	%
2022	3,145	73.26%	1,120	26.09%	28	0.65%

According to the Secretary of State's Office, as of February 28, 2023, Republicans hold a plurality of registered voters in Hamilton County for the first time in over a century. The county has radically shifted from being a Democratic stronghold to becoming a Republican one during the 21st century.

Hamilton County Voter Registration & Party Enrollment as of February 28, 2023
Political Party	Total Voters	Percentage
Republican	3,305	42.25%
Democratic	3,298	42.16%
Independent	1,108	14.17%
Third Parties	111	1.42%
Total	7,822	100%

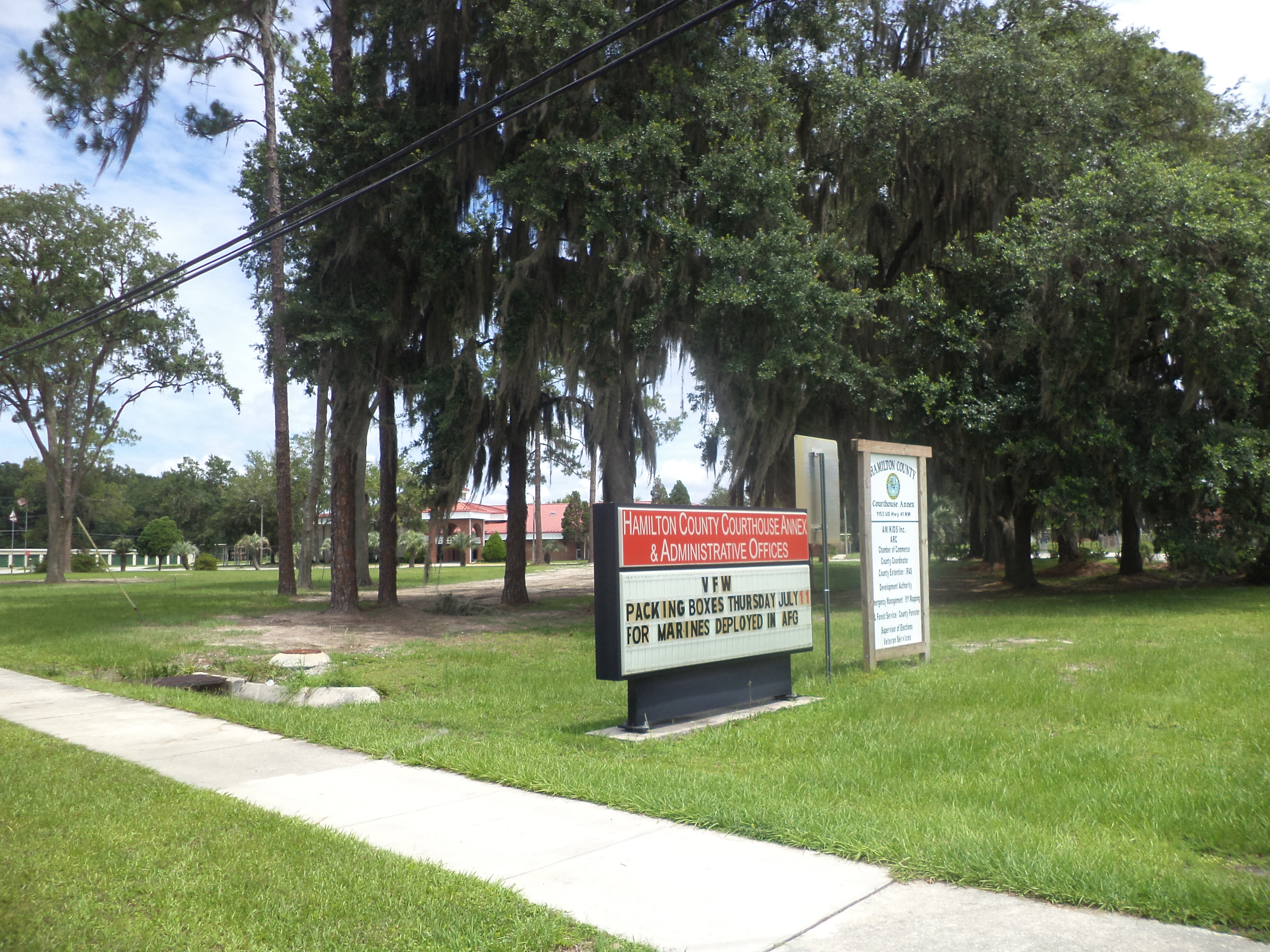
Hamilton County Courthouse Annex and Administrative Offices

== See also ==
- National Register of Historic Places listings in Hamilton County, Florida
