= Hamilton County School District =

School district in Florida, United States

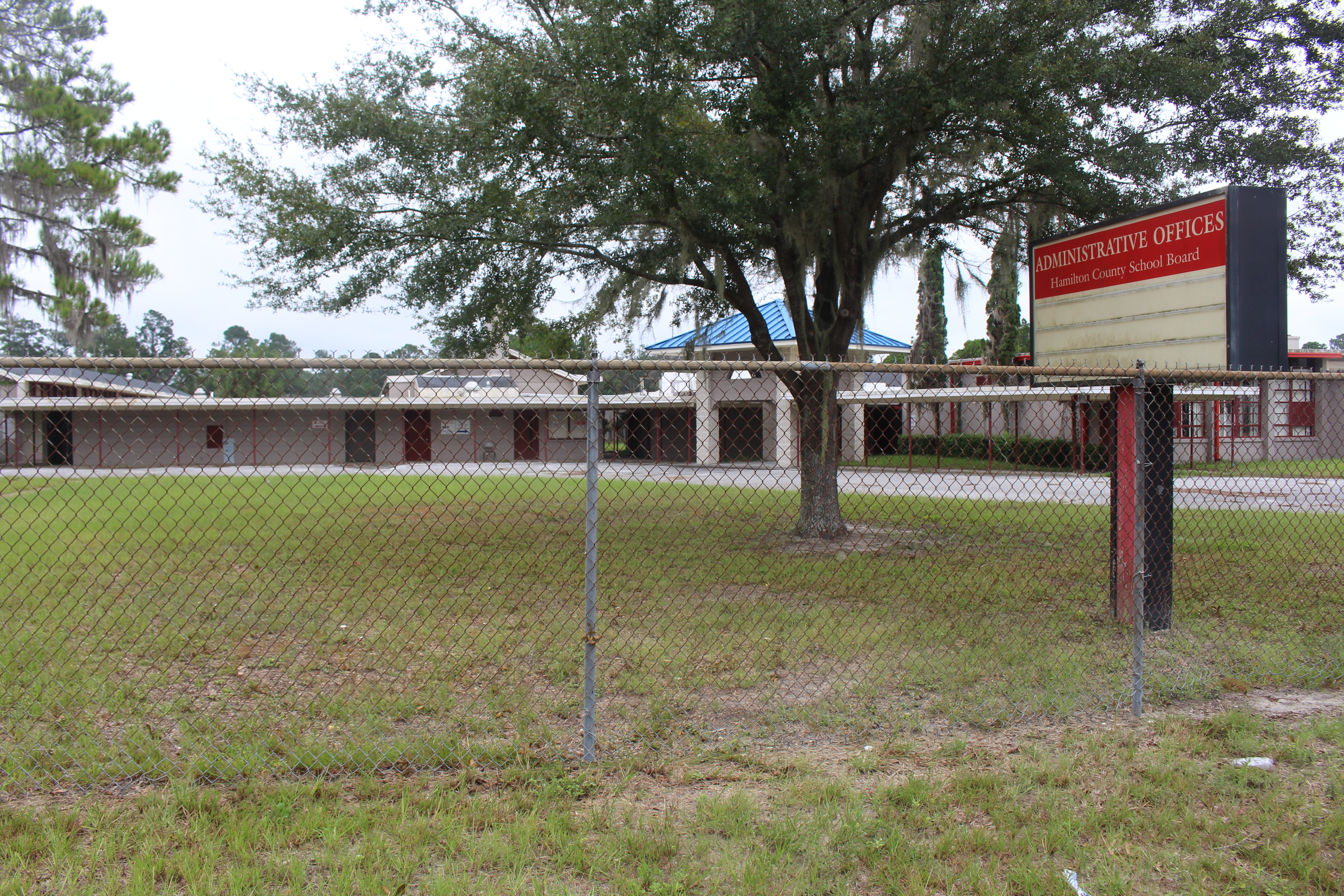
- District administrative offices

Address
- 5683 U.S. Highway 129 South Jasper, Florida, 32052; United States

District information
- Type: Public
- Grades: PreK–12
- Superintendent: Dorothy Lee Wetherington-Zamora
- NCES District ID: 1200720

Students and staff
- Students: 1,590
- Teachers: 92.59
- Staff: 235.03
- Student–teacher ratio: 17.17

Other information
- Website: www.hamiltonfl.com

Hamilton County School District (HCSD) is a school district headquartered on the grounds of Hamilton County High School in unincorporated Hamilton County, Florida, south of Jasper. It serves the entire county.

== History ==
Hamilton County School District is a small rural school district serving Hamilton County in northern Florida, near the Georgia border. The district is headquartered on the grounds of Hamilton County High School in unincorporated Hamilton County, south of Jasper, Florida. The district serves students from Pre-Kindergarten through 12th grade across the county. As of the 2024-25 school year, the district serves approximately 1,590 students with 92 teachers, maintaining a student-teacher ratio of approximately 17 to 1. The current superintendent is Dorothy Lee Wethering Zamora.

Circa 2003 the school district had about 2,100 students. It previously had its headquarters in another unincorporated area in the county.

== Schools ==
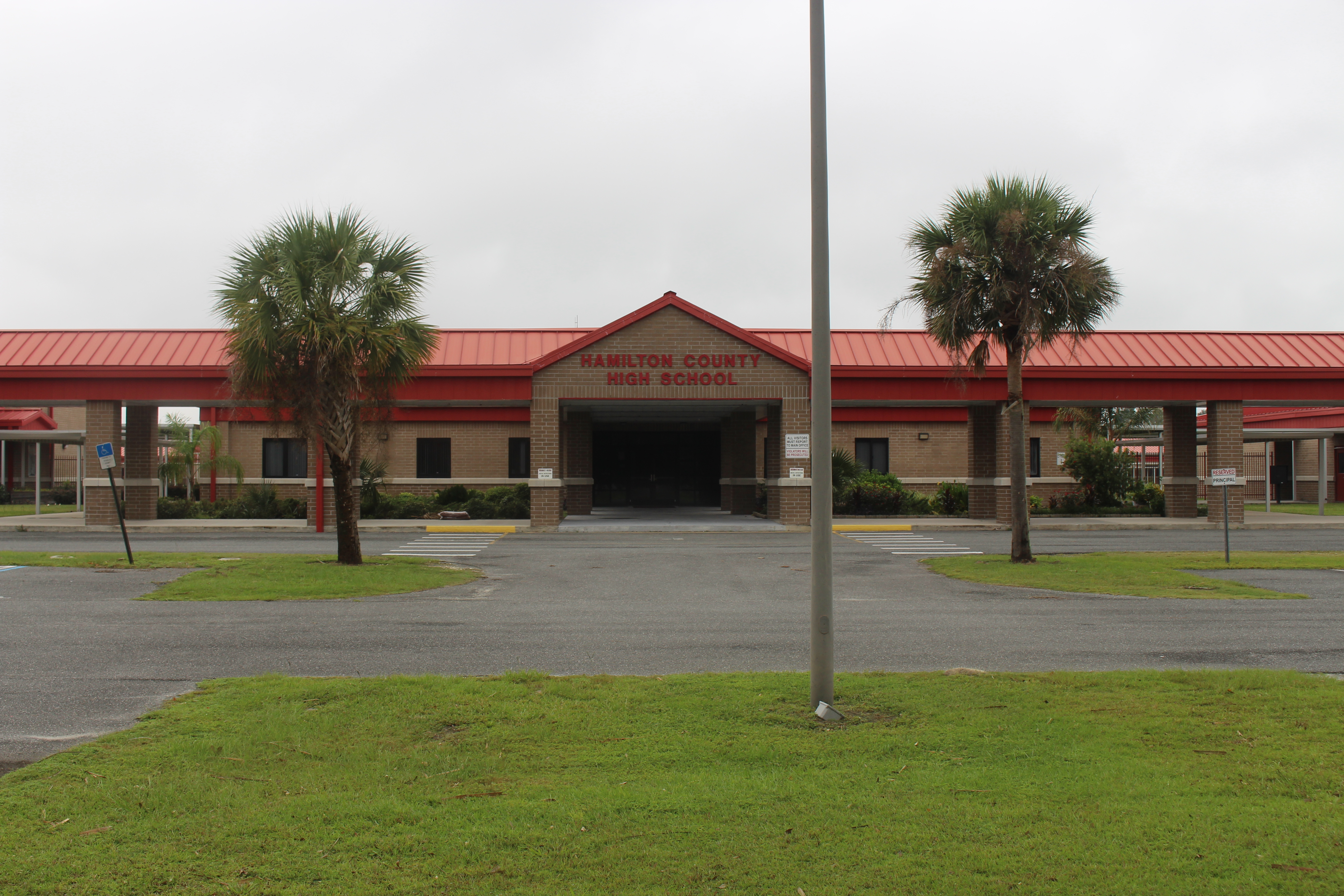
Hamilton County High School

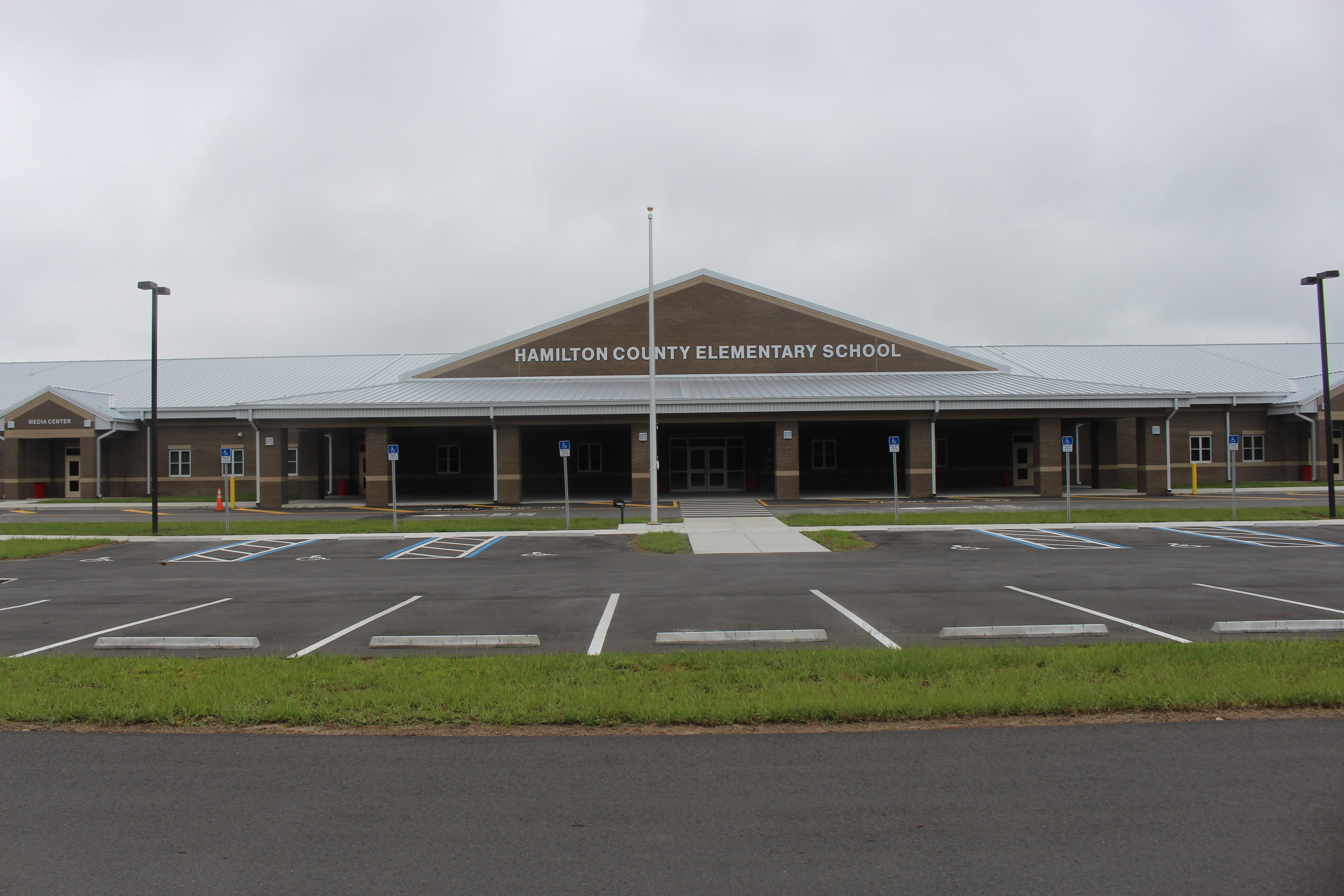
Hamilton County Elementary School

- Hamilton County High School (Unincorporated area) - serves middle school and high school
- Hamilton County Elementary School (Unincorporated area) - serves pre-kindergarten through 5th grade

Former schools:

- Greenwood School (K-12)
- Elementary schools:
  - Central Hamilton Elementary School (Jasper)
  - North Hamilton Elementary School (Jennings)
  - South Hamilton Elementary School (White Springs)
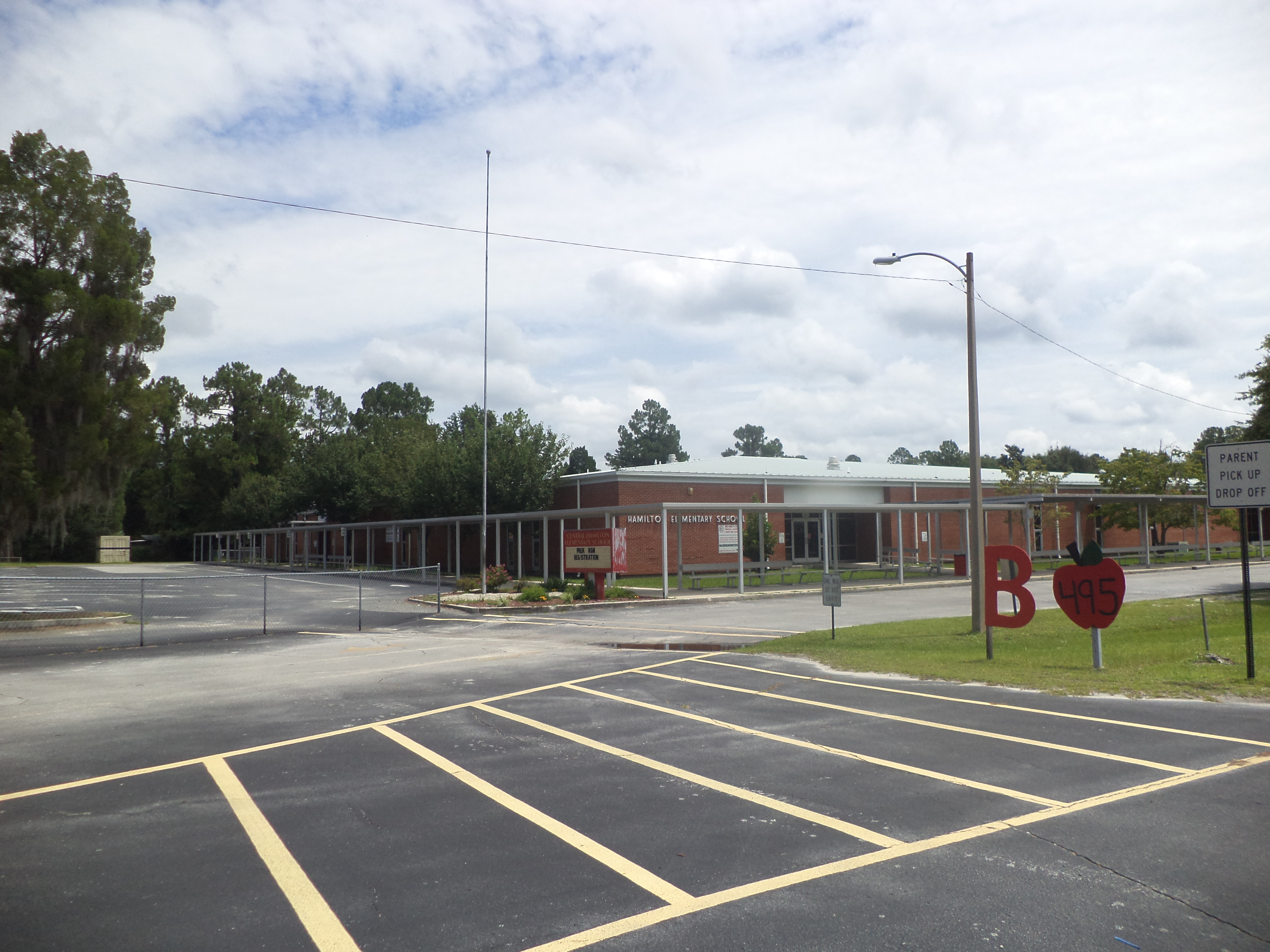
Central Hamilton Elementary School in Jasper

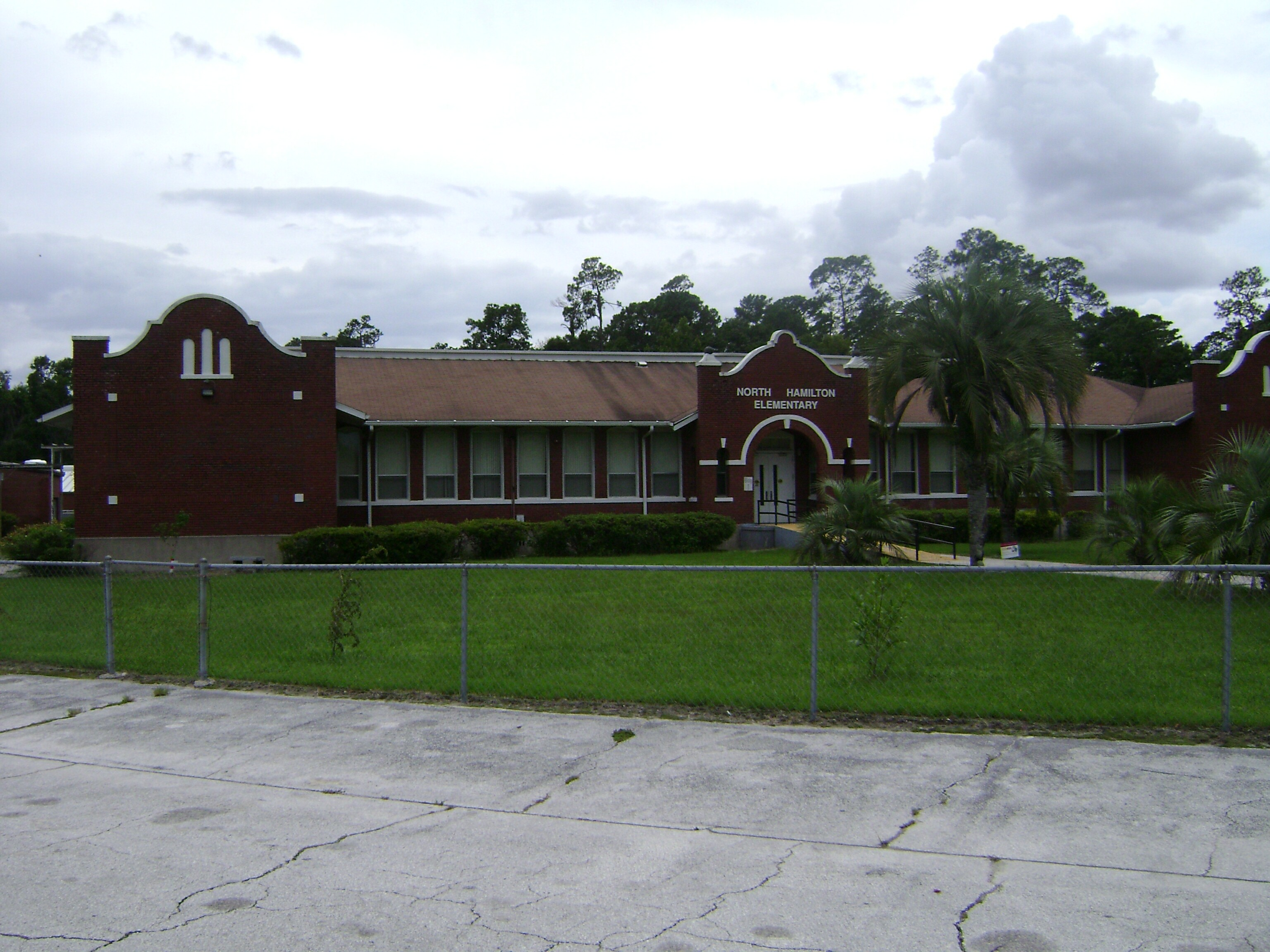
North Hamilton Elementary School in Jennings

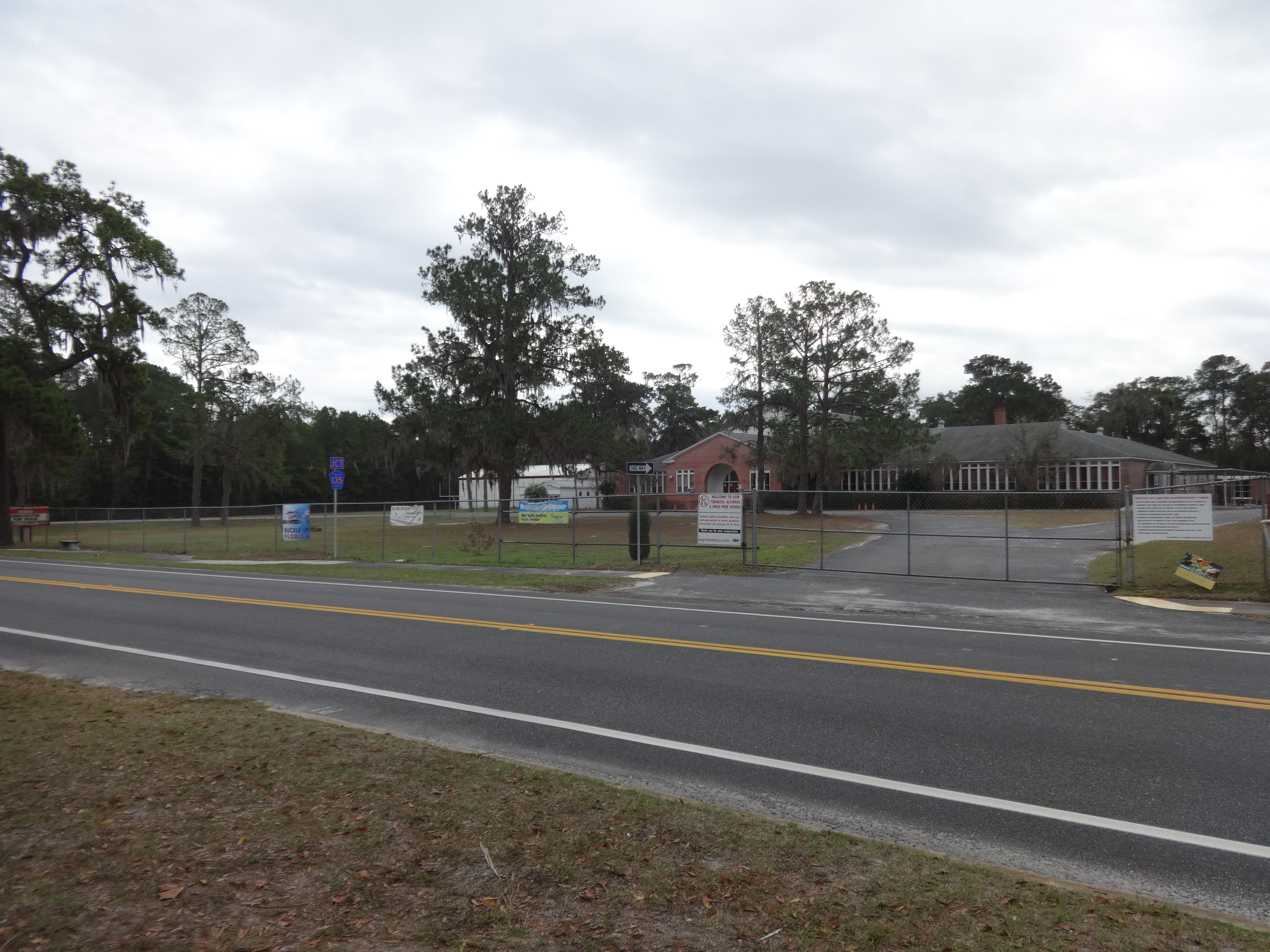
South Hamilton Elementary School in White Springs

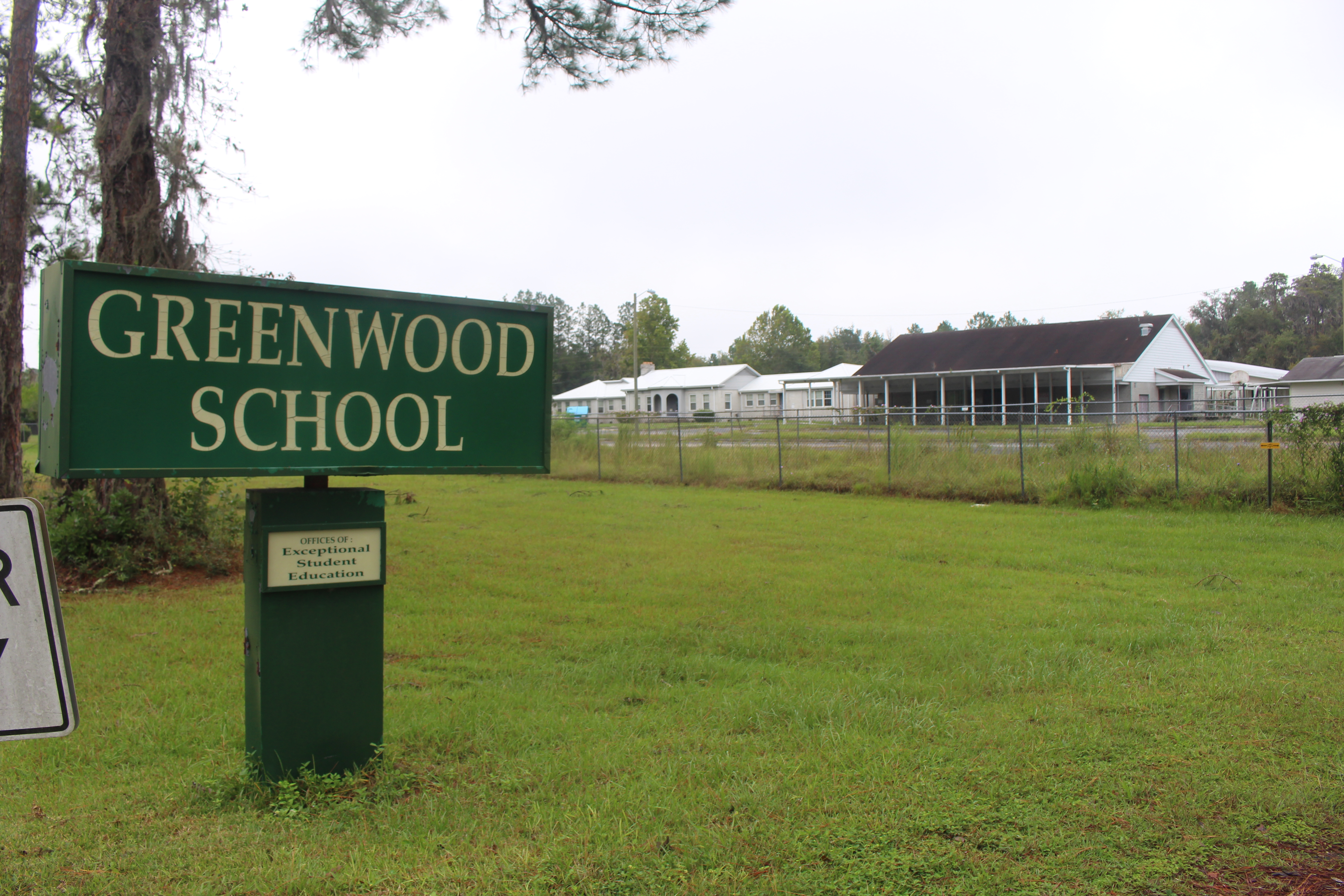
Greenwood School

=== Hamilton County Elementary School ===
The district consolidated three elementary schools into the new Hamilton County Elementary School, located at the high school site. Four of the five school board members agreed to the consolidation during an April 14, 2014 vote. The district originally planned to build it at the JRE Lee Complex, but on June 9, 2014 the district decided to change the location of the school. The Florida Legislature approved the school's funding, and groundbreaking was held on July 11, 2016. Culpeper/Gray is the architect. The opening was scheduled for August 2017.
