= Johns House =

Historic house in Florida, United States

- U.S. National Register of Historic Places
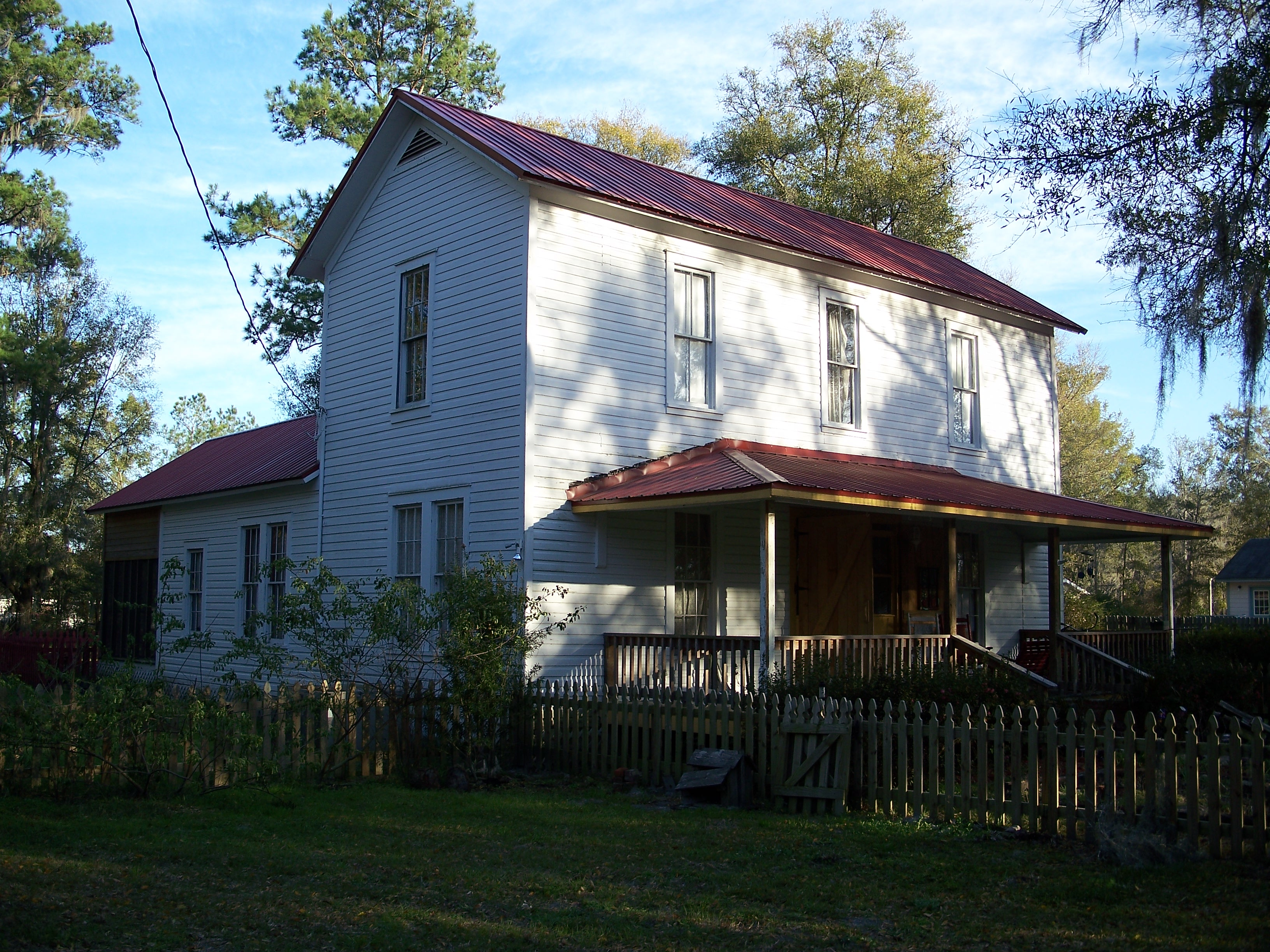

- Location within Florida Location within the United States
- Location: Jct. of CR 135 and Adams Memorial Dr., White Springs, Florida
- Coordinates: 30°19′59″N 82°44′54″W
- Built: 1928
- Architect: John Lee Johns
- Architectural style: Frame Vernacular
- NRHP reference No.: 98000835
- Added to NRHP: July 9, 1998

The Johns House is a historic house in White Springs, Florida. It is located at the junction of CR 135 and Adams Memorial Drive. On July 10, 1998, it was added to the U.S. National Register of Historic Places.
