= Thomas Albert Jennings =

American politician (1865–1917)

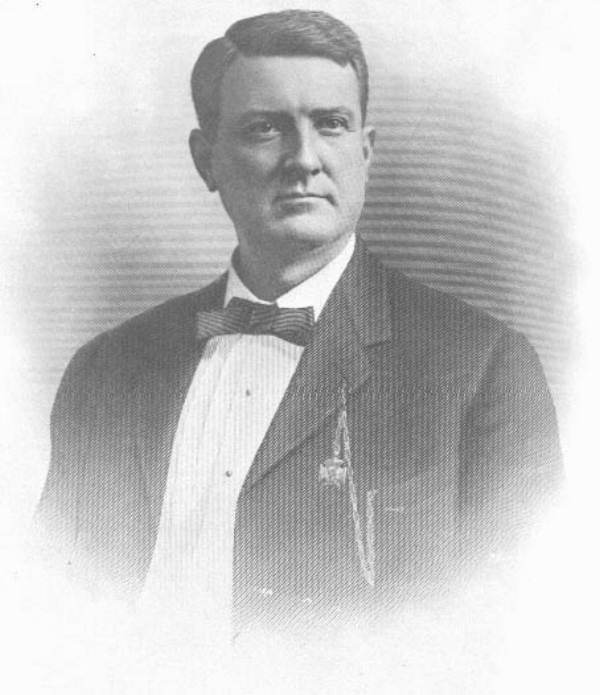
- Born: January 8, 1865; Jennings, Florida
- Died: March 16, 1917 (aged 52)
- Occupation: Politician
- Political party: Democrat

Thomas Albert Jennings (January 8, 1865 – March 16, 1917) was an American banker, businessman, and politician. He served as Speaker of the Florida House of Representatives.

== Biography ==
Jennings was born on January 8, 1865 Jennings, Florida. He attended Emory College. He was president of the Bank of Jennings. He moved to Pensacola, Florida. He ran the Jennings Naval Stores Company.

Jennings was a delegate to the Democratic National Convention in 1888, 1892, 1908 and 1912 and an elector in 1904. He was chair of the Pensacola Board of Public Works in 1909. In 1910, he was elected to represent Escambia County, Florida in the Florida House of Representatives and was Speaker of the Florida House of Representatives in 1911. He opened the Globe Naval Stores Company in 1913 and was a director of the Gulf, Florida, and Alabama Railway.
