= List of county roads in Hamilton County, Florida =

- County road shields used in Florida

Highway names
- Interstates: Interstate X (I-X)
- US Highways: U.S. Highway X (US X)
- State: State Road X (SR X)
- County: County Road X (CR-X)

System links
- County roads in Florida; County roads in Hamilton County

The following is a list of county roads in Hamilton County, Florida. All county roads are maintained by the county in which they reside, however not all of them are marked with standard MUTCD approved county road shields.

== County Roads in Hamilton County, Florida ==
Route	Road Name(s)	From	To	Notes
CR 6		US 41 / US 129 / SR 6 (SR 25 / SR 51 / SR 100) / 2nd Ave NE in Jasper	CR 6 at the Columbia County line northeast of Blacks Still	Former SR 6
CR 25A	Jackson Street; Camp Street	US 41 (SR 25 / SR 100) in White Springs	CR 132 southwest of Camps Still	
CR 51	1st Avenue NE; 2nd Street NE; Palmetto Avenue	US 41 / US 129 (SR 25 / SR 51 / SR 100) / 1st Avenue SE in Jasper	Flaline Break Road at the Georgia state line north of Bakers Mill	Former SR 51
CR 132		US 129 (SR 51) west-northwest of Genoa	US 41 (SR 25 / SR 100) / SE 142 Boulevard in Genoa	Former SR 132
CR 135	Third Street	US 41 (SR 25 / SR 100) in White Springs	CR 6 / NE 180 Boulevard northeast of Blacks Still	Former SR 135
CR 137		US 41 (SR 25 / SR 100) in Facil	US 41 (SR 25 / SR 100) in Hillcoat	Former SR 137
CR 137A	78th Street	CR 137	Dead End	Former SR 137 Leads to mines surrounding Occidental Wildlife Management Area
CR 141	Hamilton Avenue	CR 141 at the Madison county line at a bridge over the Withlacoochee River south-southeast of Blue Springs US 41 (SR 25) / SR 143 in Jennings	US 41 (SR 25) in Jennings SR 135 at the Georgia state line north of Jennings	Former SR 141; FDOT's Hamilton County map indicates that the northern segment begins on Hamilton Avenue at Hewitt Street in Jennings, just southwest of its signed southern terminus, but this is signed as part of SR 143.
CR 143		CR 141 / SW 74 Street south-southeast of Blue Springs SR 6 / SW 28 Lane in Blue Springs	SR 6 east of Blue Springs I-75 (SR 93) / SR 143	Former SR 143
CR 145		CR 152 west-southwest of Jennings	Bellville Road at the Georgia state line west-northwest of Jennings	
CR 146		CR 143 southwest of Jennings	SR 6 north-northwest of Adams	Former SR 146
CR 148	Northwest 86th Boulevard; Southwest 59th Drive	US 41 (SR 25) / SW 86 Boulevard southwest of Rawls	US 129 (SR 100) in Rawls	Unsigned
CR 150	Cherry Street	CR 141 / Cherry Street in Jennings	US 129 (SR 100) east-southeast of Jennings	Former SR 150
CR 152	SW 15th Street	CR 150 at the Madison County line at a bridge over the Withlacoochee River west-southwest of Jennings 8th Street SW in Jasper	US 41 (SR 25) south-southeast of Jennings US 41 / US 129 (SR 25 / SR 100) / Chanbridge Drive in Jasper	Former SR 152
CR 158		CR 249 / SW 79 Drive south-southwest of Jasper	US 129 (SR 51) / SE 113 Boulevard south-southwest of Hillcoat	Former SR 158
CR 249	Martin Luther King Drive	CR 751 at Gibson County Park southwest of Adams	US 41 / US 129 (SR 25 / SR 51 / SR 100) / Martin Luther King Drive in Jasper	Former SR 249
CR 751	Northwest 63rd Avenue	CR 249 at the Suwannee County line at a bridge over the Suwannee River southwest of Adams	CR 141 north-northeast of West Lake	
