= First United Methodist Church (Jasper, Florida) =

Historic church in Florida, United States

- United Methodist Church
- U.S. National Register of Historic Places
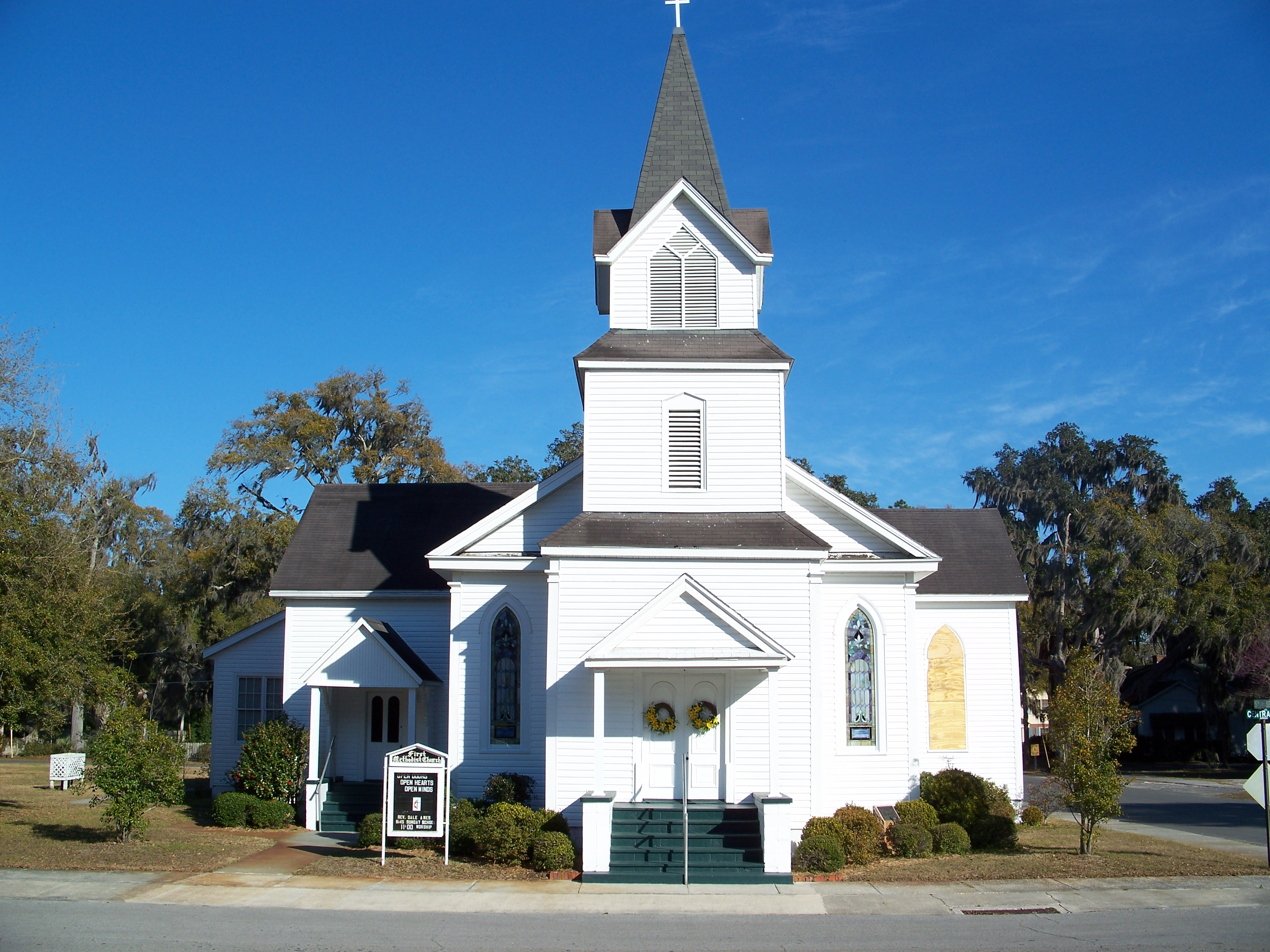
- First United Methodist Church, Jasper, Florida
- Location: 405 Central Avenue, S.W. Jasper, Florida
- Coordinates: 30°30′53″N 82°56′52″W
- Built: 1878
- Architectural style: Carpenter Gothic
- NRHP reference No.: 78000943
- Added to NRHP: September 29, 1978

The First United Methodist Church is a historic Carpenter Gothic church in Jasper, Florida. It is located at 405 Central Avenue, S.W. On September 29, 1978, it was added to the National Register of Historic Places as United Methodist Church.

== See also ==
- National Register of Historic Places listings in Florida
