= North Hamilton Elementary School =

- Jennings High School
- U.S. National Register of Historic Places
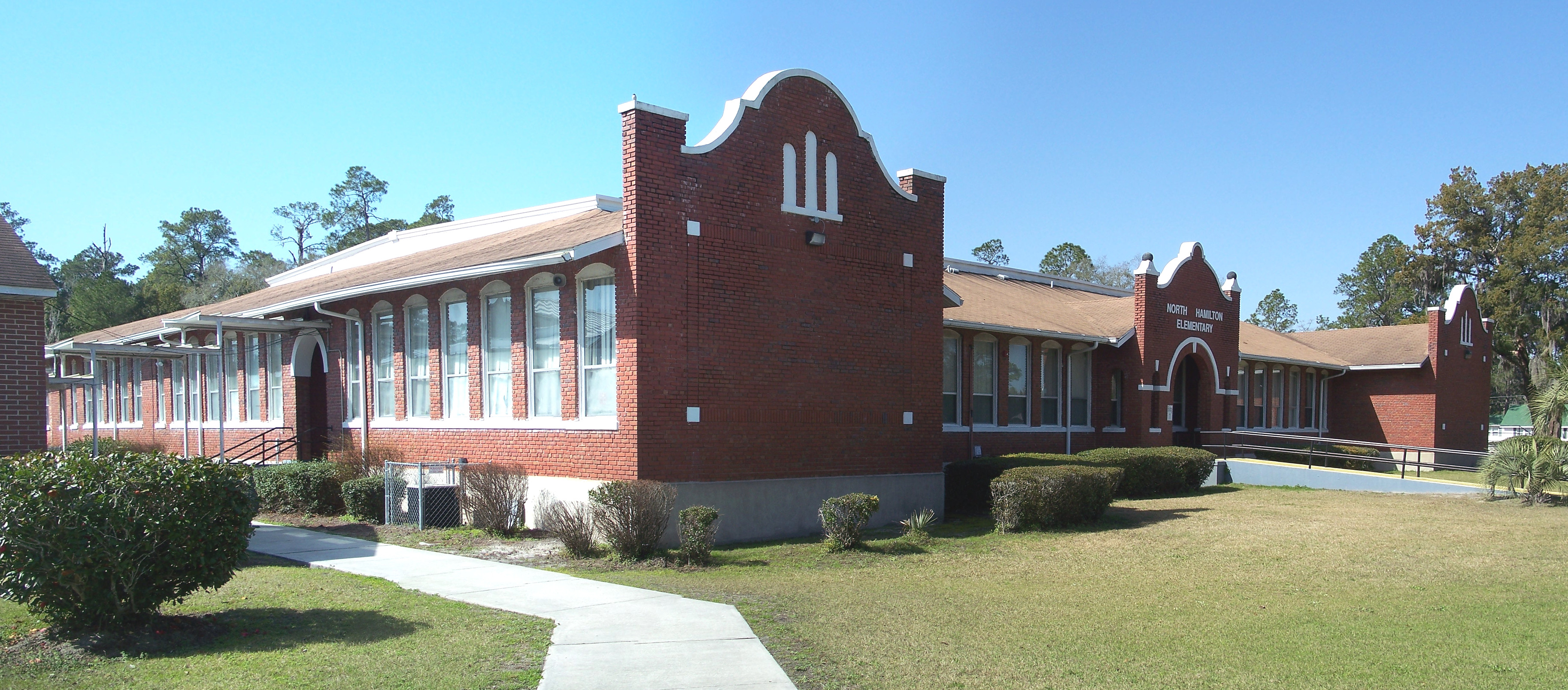

- Location within Florida Location within the United States
- Location: 1291 Florida St., Jennings, Florida
- Coordinates: 30°36′11″N 83°05′34″W
- Area: 4 acres (1.6 ha)
- Built: 1927
- Architectural style: Mission/spanish Revival
- NRHP reference No.: 07001357
- Added to NRHP: January 10, 2008

North Hamilton Elementary School, formerly the Jennings High School, is a historic school in Jennings, Florida. The high school was built in 1927 and converted to an elementary school in 1965. On January 10, 2008, it was added to the U.S. National Register of Historic Places. It is a part of the Hamilton County School District.

North Hamilton Elementary was consolidated into a new elementary school, Hamilton County Elementary School, located in an unincorporated area south of Jasper. Its opening was scheduled for August 2017.
