= Hamilton County High School =

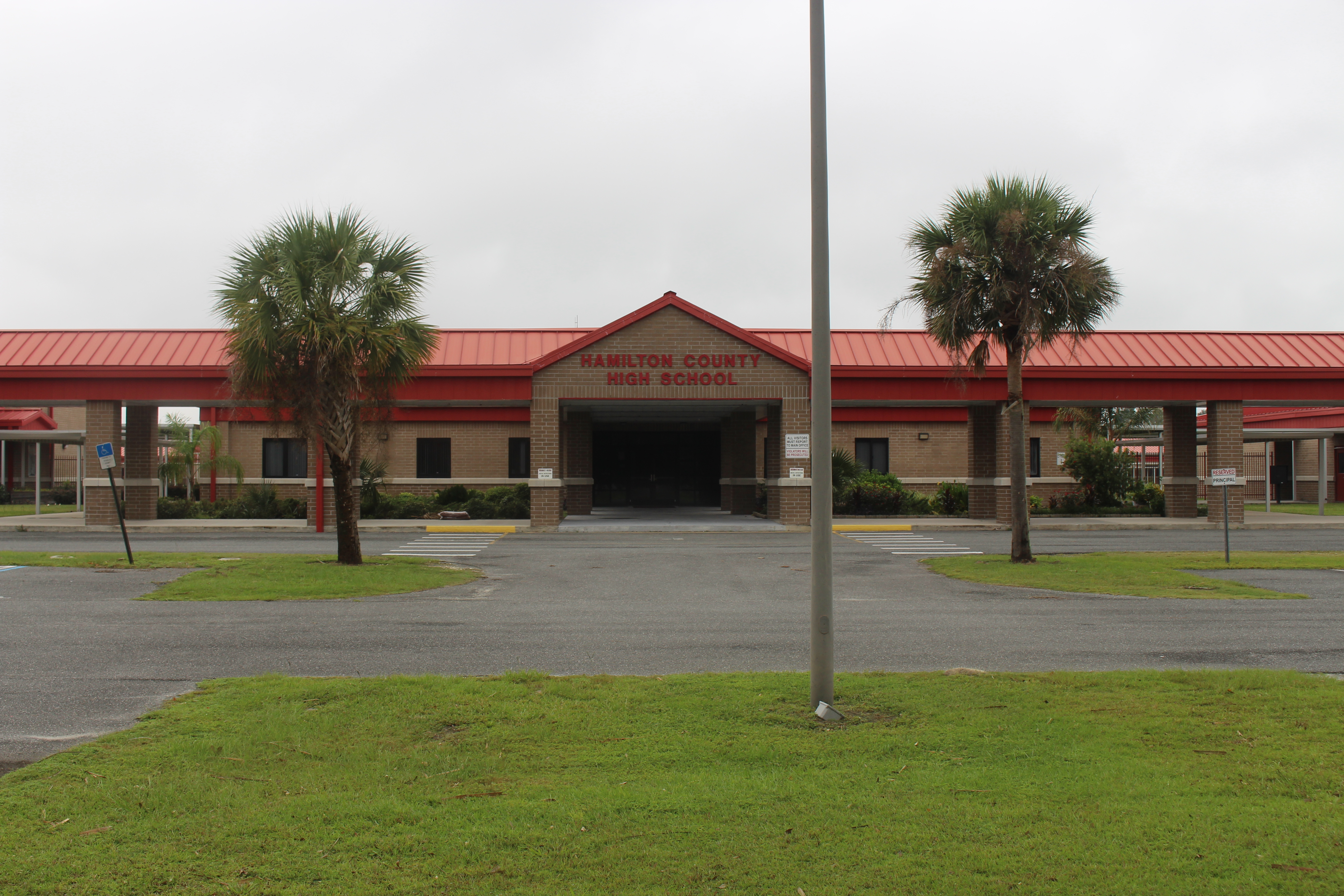

Location
- 5683 US Highway 129 S Jasper, Florida; United States
- Coordinates: 30.4770°N 82.9360°W

Information
- Type: Public
- School district: Hamilton County School District
- NCES School ID: 120072000872
- Principal: Ryan Mitchell
- Teaching staff: 50.00 (on an FTE basis)
- Grades: 6 to 12
- Enrollment: 849 (2023-2024)
- Student to teacher ratio: 16.98
- Color
- Mascot: Trojan
- Website: http://hch.hamiltonfl.com/

Hamilton County High School (HCHS) is a public high school located at 5683 US Highway 129 in unincorporated Hamilton County, Florida, south of Jasper. A part of the Hamilton County School District (HCSD), its sports teams are nicknamed the "Fighting Trojans".

The school grounds houses the HCSD administrative offices. Serving middle school and high school levels, it was formerly at 1153 US Highway 41 N.W. in Jasper. The current building was scheduled to open in December 2003 or January 2004.

== Gallery ==
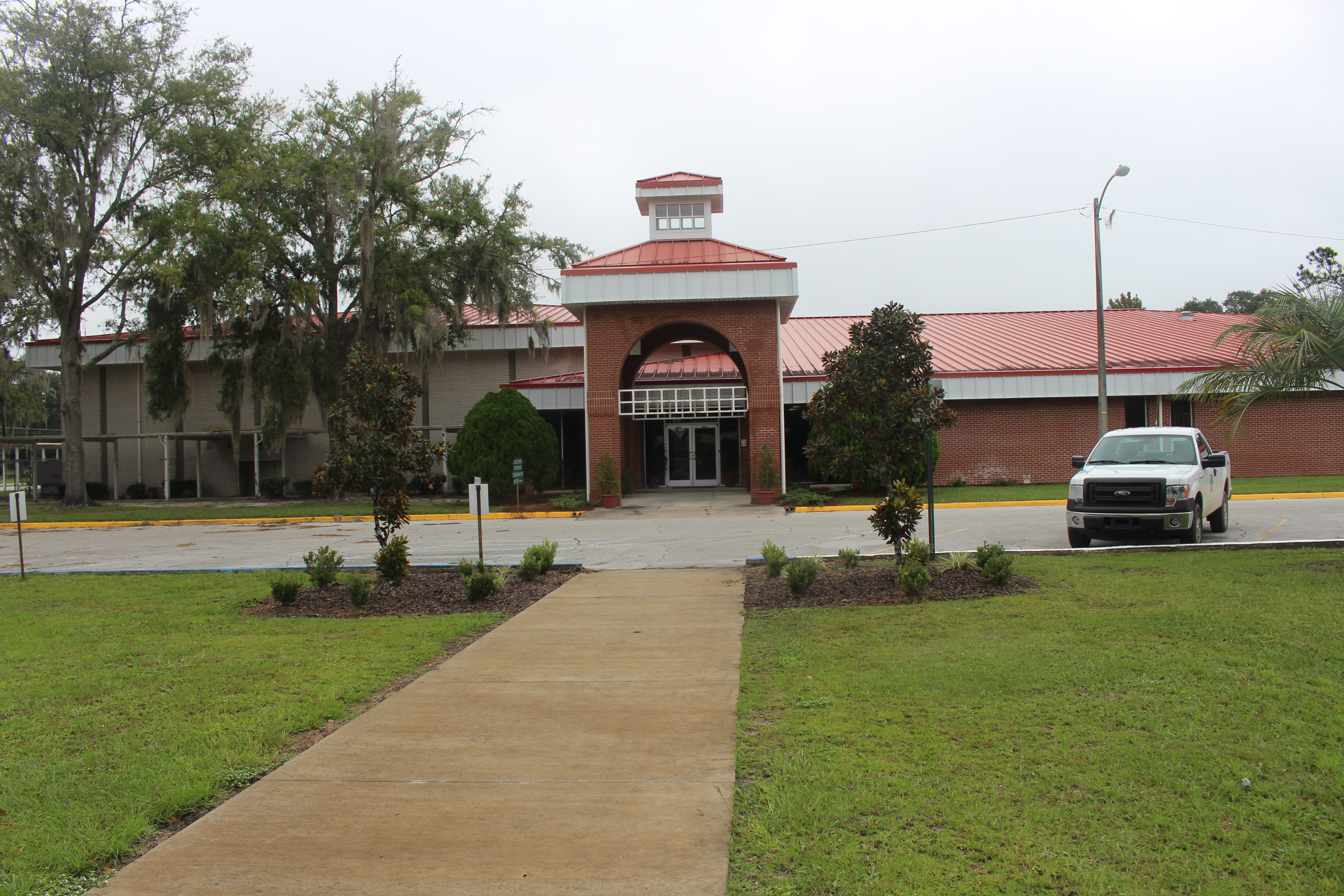
Former building, now houses the Chamber of Commerce
