= Old Hamilton County Jail =

- U.S. National Register of Historic Places
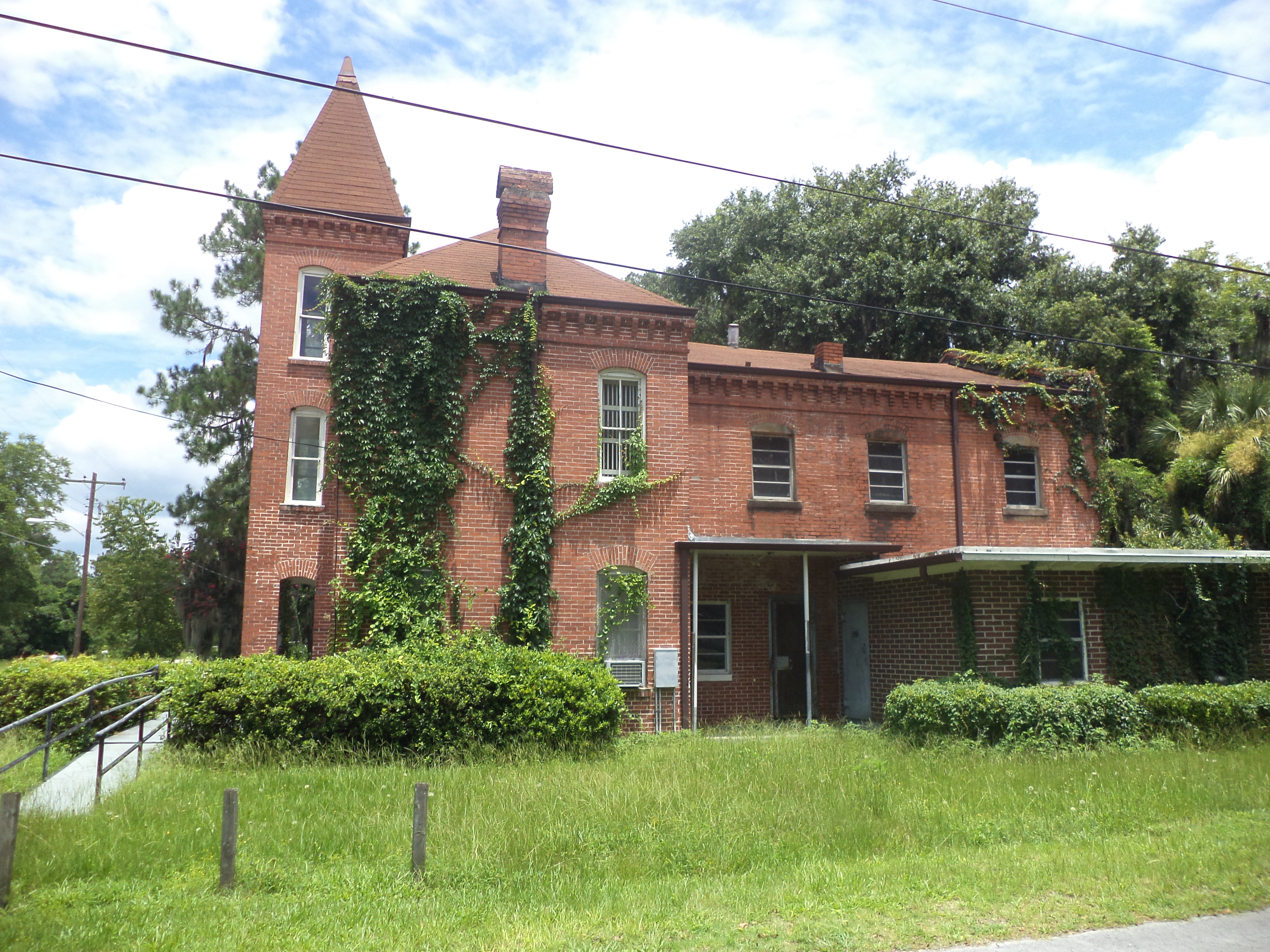

- Location within Florida Location within the United States
- Location: Jasper, Florida
- Coordinates: 30°31′16″N 82°56′46″W
- Area: less than one acre
- Built: 1893
- Architect: P. J. Pauly
- Architectural style: Romanesque Revival
- NRHP reference No.: 83001423
- Added to NRHP: July 7, 1983

The Old Hamilton County Jail is a historic building at 501 Northeast 1st Avenue, Jasper, Florida, United States. It was added to the National Register of Historic Places in 1983. The Old Hamilton County Jail now serves as the Hamilton County Historical Museum.

== Hamilton County Historical Museum ==
The Hamilton County Historical Museum consists of a jail.

== See also ==
Jails and prisons listed on the National Register of Historic Places
