= Jennings, Florida =

Town in the state of Florida, United States

- Town
- Town of Jennings
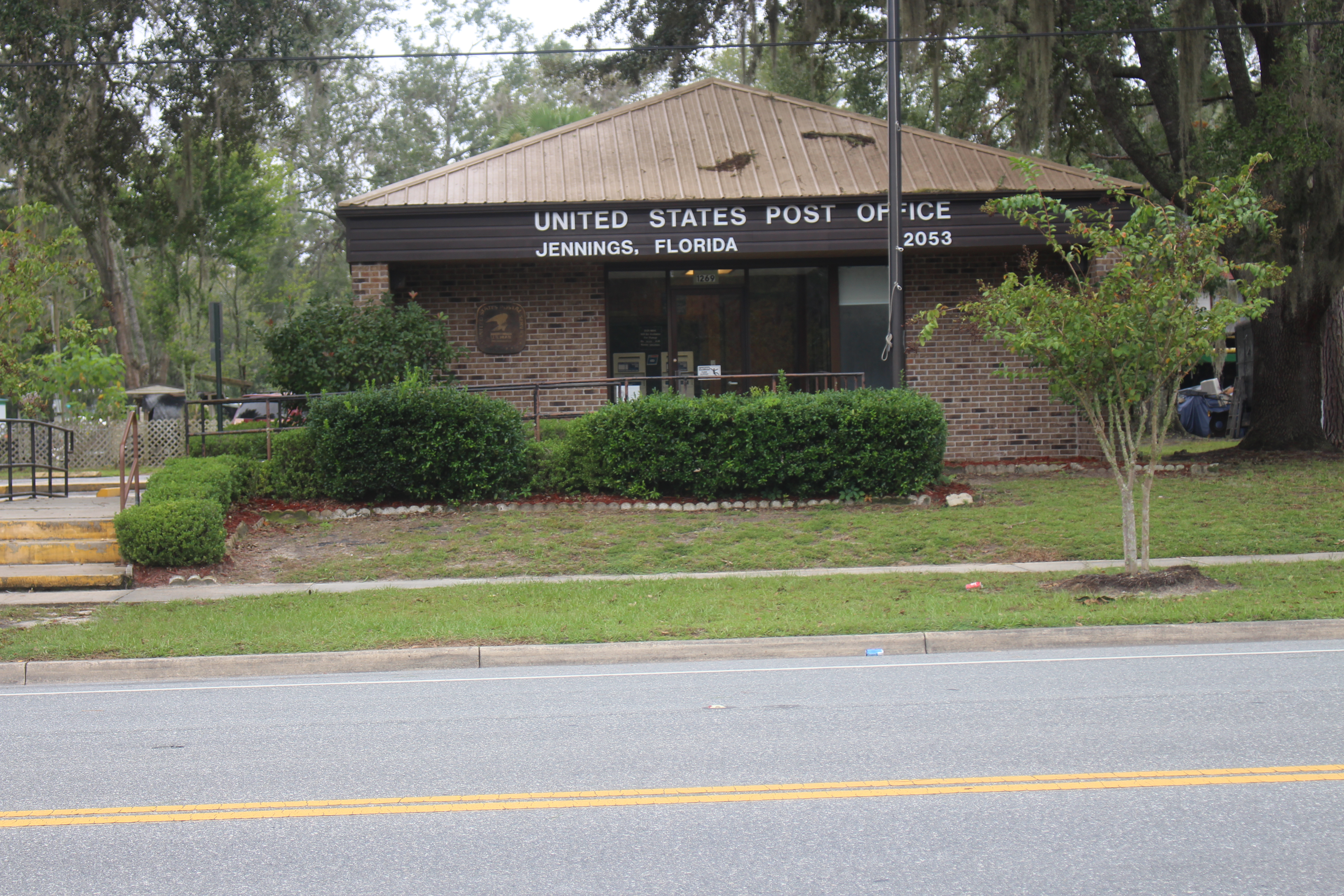
- Jennings United States Post Office
- Motto: "In God We Trust"
- Location in Hamilton County and the state of Florida
- Coordinates: 30°35′44″N 83°07′10″W
- Country: United States
- State: Florida
- County: Hamilton
- Settled (Jennnings Station): c. 1825-1860
- Incorporated (Town of Jennings): 1900

Government
  - Type: Council-Manager
  - Mayor: Charles Barrett
  - Vice Mayor: Antonette Crumedy
  - Councilors: Philip Jackson, John Prine, and Cynthia Daniels
  - Town Manager: Jennifer Hightower
  - Town Clerk: Leslie Crews

Area
  - Total: 2.91 sq mi (7.54 km^{2})
  - Land: 2.91 sq mi (7.54 km^{2})
  - Water: 0 sq mi (0.00 km^{2})
- Elevation: 148 ft (45 m)

Population (2020)
  - Total: 749
  - Density: 299.7/sq mi (115.73/km^{2})
- Time zone: UTC-5 (Eastern (EST))
  - Summer (DST): UTC-4 (EDT)
- ZIP code: 32053
- Area code: 386
- FIPS code: 12-35525
- GNIS feature ID: 2405914

Jennings is a town in Hamilton County, Florida, United States. The population was 749 at the 2020 census, down from 878 at the 2010 census.

== Geography ==
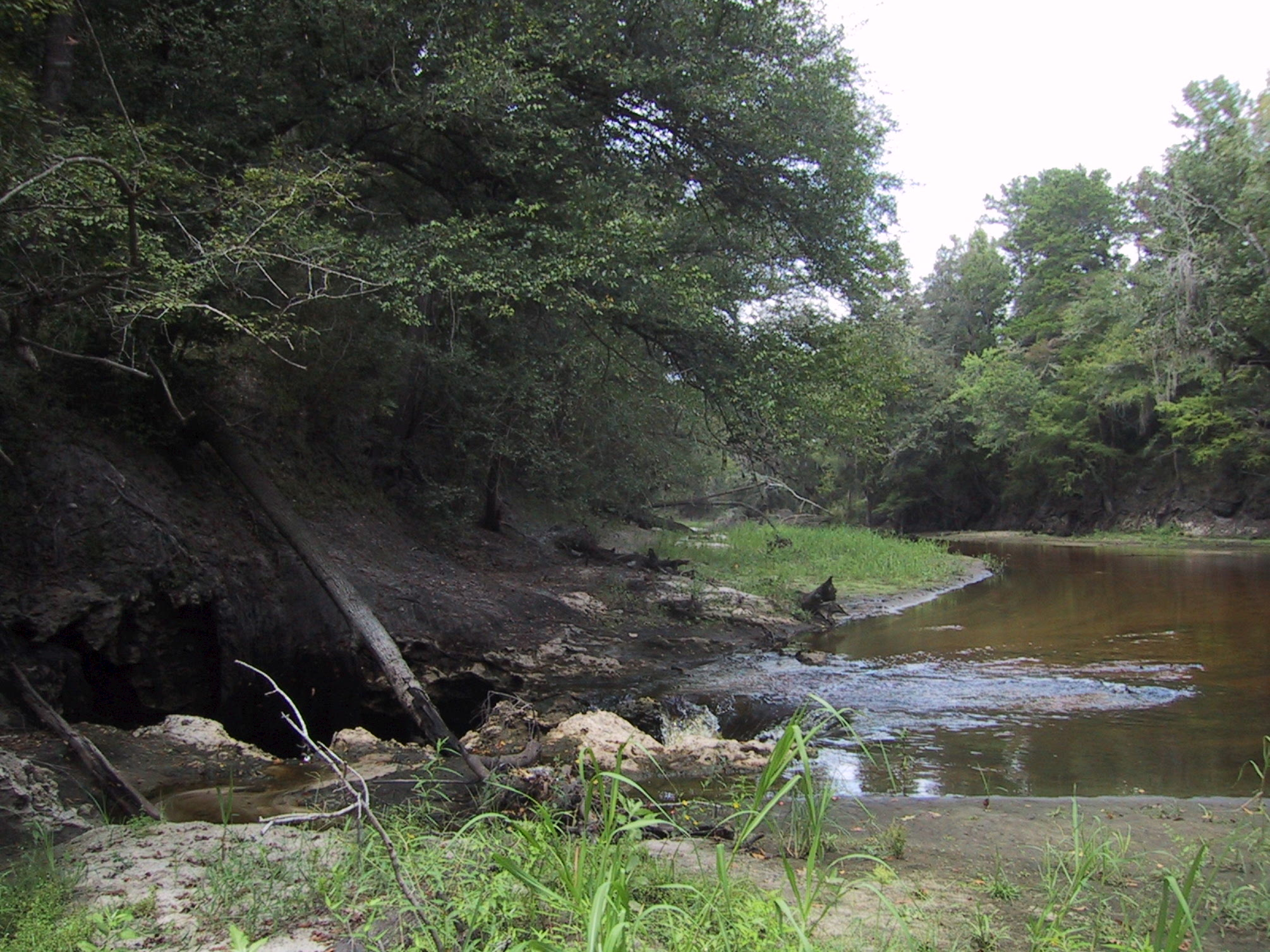
The entire surface water flow of the Alapaha River near Jennings, Florida going into a sinkhole leading to the Floridan Aquifer groundwater

The approximate coordinates for Town of Jennings is located in northwestern Hamilton County. U.S. Route 41 passes through the town as Plum Street, leading southeast 12 miles (19 km) to Jasper, the county seat, and northwest 8 miles (13 km) to Lake Park, Georgia. Interstate 75 runs along the southwest border of the town, with access from Exit 467 (Hamilton Avenue). I-75 leads southeast 32 miles (51 km) to Interstate 10 near Lake City, Florida, and northwest 20 miles (32 km) to Valdosta, Georgia.

It is the largest settlement in Hamilton County west of the Alapaha River, a tributary of the Suwannee River.

According to the United States Census Bureau, the town of Jennings has a total area of 2.9 square miles (7.5 km^{2}), all land.

=== Climate ===
The climate in this area is characterized by hot, humid summers and generally mild winters. According to the Köppen climate classification, the Town of Jennings has a humid subtropical climate zone (Cfa).

== Demographics ==
Historical population
Census	Pop.	Note	%±
1910	480		—
1920	628		30.8%
1930	561		−10.7%
1940	499		−11.1%
1950	549		10.0%
1960	516		−6.0%
1970	582		12.8%
1980	749		28.7%
1990	712		−4.9%
2000	833		17.0%
2010	878		5.4%
2020	749		−14.7%
U.S. Decennial Census

=== 2010 and 2020 census ===
Jennings racial composition (Hispanics excluded from racial categories) (NH = Non-Hispanic)
Race	Pop 2010	Pop 2020	% 2010	% 2020
White (NH)	201	182	22.89%	24.30%
Black or African American (NH)	269	213	30.64%	28.44%
Native American or Alaska Native (NH)	8	2	0.91%	0.27%
Asian (NH)	2	2	0.23%	0.27%
Pacific Islander or Native Hawaiian (NH)	0	0	0.00%	0.00%
Some other race (NH)	0	1	0.00%	0.13%
Two or more races/Multiracial (NH)	5	23	0.57%	3.07%
Hispanic or Latino (any race)	393	326	44.76%	43.52%
Total	878	749	100.00%	100.00%

As of the 2020 United States census, there were 749 people, 289 households, and 183 families residing in the town.

As of the 2010 United States census, there were 878 people, 275 households, and 213 families residing in the town.

=== 2000 census ===
As of the census of 2000, there were 833 people, 282 households, and 205 families residing in the town. The population density was 461.3 inhabitants per square mile (178.1/km^{2}). There were 321 housing units at an average density of 177.8 per square mile (68.6/km^{2}). The racial makeup of the town was 43.70% White, 43.10% African American, 0.60% Native American, 0.60% Asian, 10.08% from other races, and 1.92% from two or more races. Hispanic or Latino of any race were 22.69% of the population.

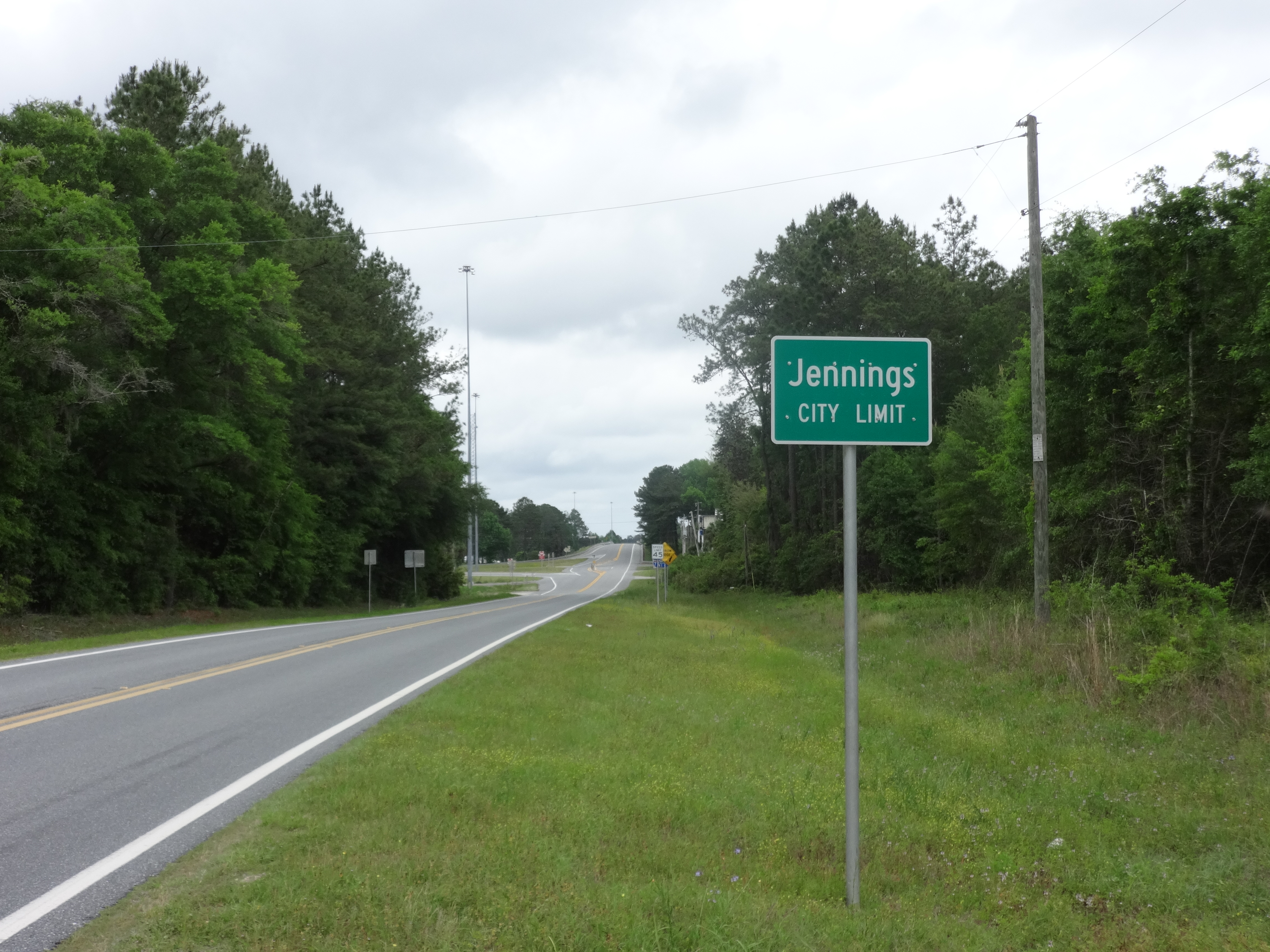
Jennings city limit sign

In 2000, there were 282 households out of which 33.3% had children under the age of 18 living with them, 44.7% were married couples living together, 20.2% had a female householder with no husband present, and 27.3% were non-families. 23.0% of all households were made up of individuals and 11.7% had someone living alone who was 65 years of age or older. The average household size was 2.89 and the average family size was 3.34.

In 2000, in the town, the population was spread out with 30.6% under the age of 18, 9.0% from 18 to 24, 25.7% from 25 to 44, 22.4% from 45 to 64, and 12.2% who were 65 years of age or older. The median age was 32 years. For every 100 females, there were 98.8 males. For every 100 females age 18 and over, there were 99.3 males.

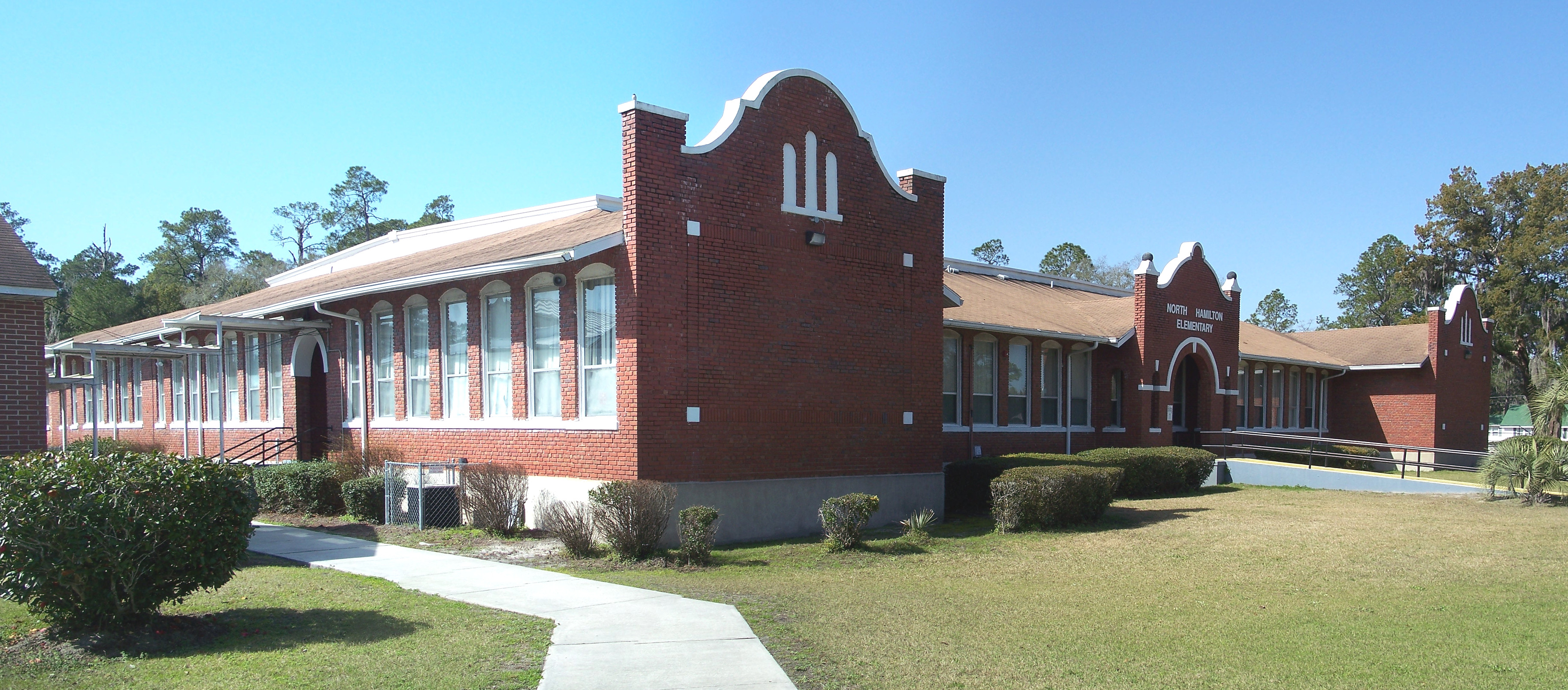
North Hamilton Elementary School (now closed)

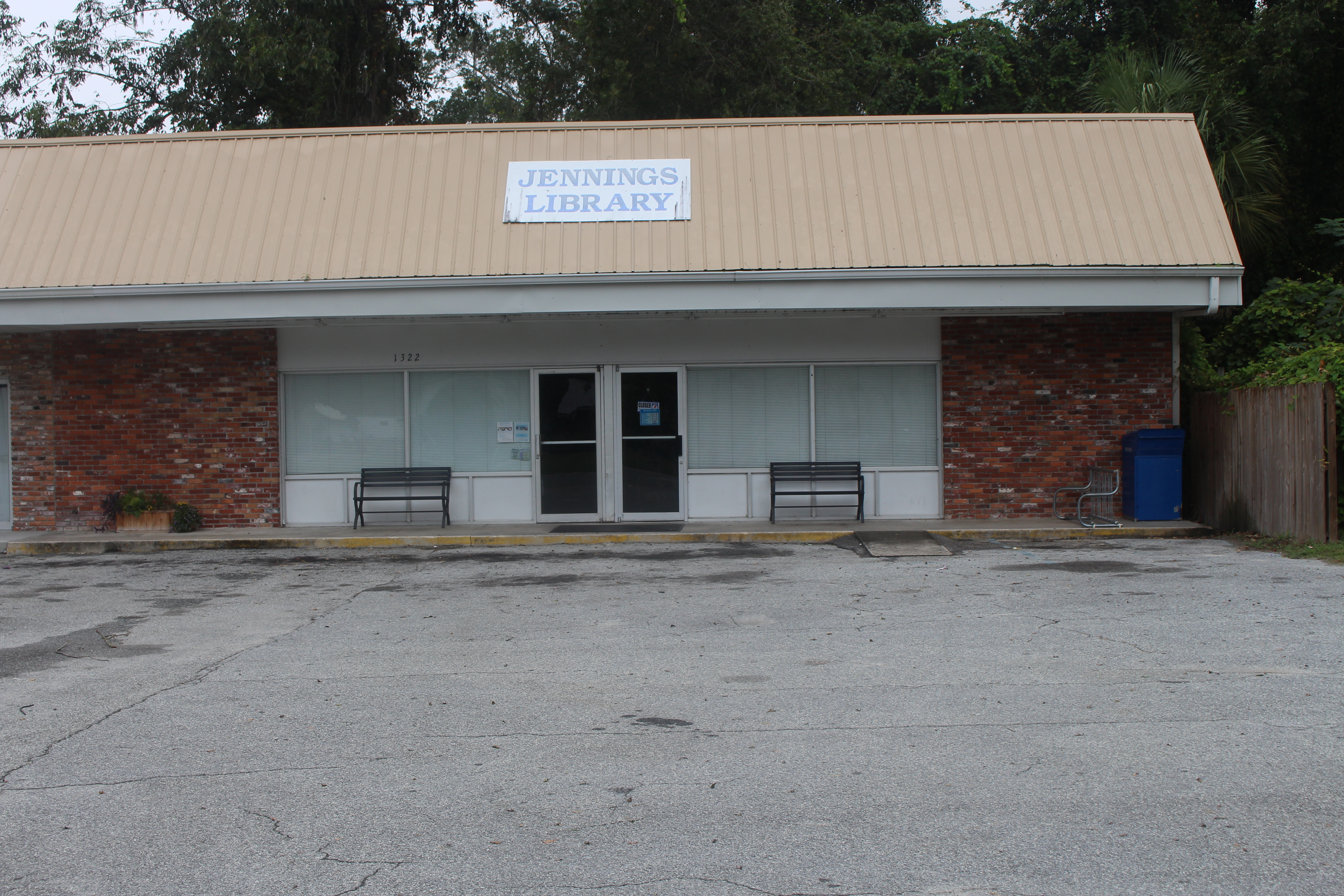
Jennings Public Library

In 2000, the median income for a household in the town was $25,714, and the median income for a family was $25,938. Males had a median income of $25,577 versus $15,982 for females. The per capita income for the town was $12,195. About 23.8% of families and 30.8% of the population were below the poverty line, including 42.9% of those under age 18 and 20.0% of those age 65 or over.

== Education ==
The Hamilton County School District operates the public schools serving Jennings; Hamilton County Elementary School and Hamilton County High School in an unincorporated area of the county. Until August 2017, North Hamilton Elementary School in Jennings served the community.

North Hamilton Elementary was consolidated into a new elementary school, Hamilton County Elementary School, located in an unincorporated area south of Jasper. Its opening was scheduled for August 2017.

The Suwannee River Regional Library System operates the Jennings Public Library.

== Notable people ==
- Andrew Prine, actor
- Thomas Albert Jennings, businessman and politician
