= Jasper, Florida =

- City
- City of Jasper
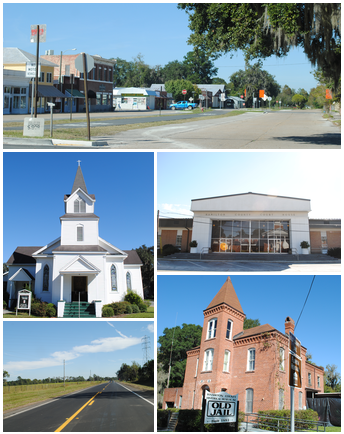
- Images top, left to right: Downtown Jasper, First United Methodist Church, Hamilton County Courthouse, U.S. Route 129, Old Hamilton County Jail
- Motto: "Florida's Front Porch"
- Location in Hamilton County and the state of Florida
- Coordinates: 30°31′8″N 82°57′4″W
- Country: United States
- State: Florida
- County: Hamilton
- Settled (Pulaski/Wall): 1827-1839
- Settled (Jasper): 1839-1840s
- Settled (Town of Jasper): 1850
- Incorporated (City of Jasper): March 2, 1858
- Named for: William Jasper

Government
  - Type: Council-Manager
  - Mayor: Williams S. Mitchell, V
  - Vice Mayor: Carlton Garrett Selph
  - Council Members: Vanessa Smith, Jhelechia Hawkins, and Chairperson; Jay Daigle, III
  - City Manager: Mark Meyers
  - City Clerk: Loretta Taylor

Area
  - Total: 2.42 sq mi (6.26 km^{2})
  - Land: 2.42 sq mi (6.26 km^{2})
  - Water: 0 sq mi (0.00 km^{2})
- Elevation: 151 ft (46 m)

Population (2020)
  - Total: 3,621
  - Density: 1,498.7/sq mi (578.66/km^{2})
- Time zone: UTC-5 (Eastern (EST))
  - Summer (DST): UTC-4 (EDT)
- ZIP code: 32052
- Area code: 386
- FIPS code: 12-35375
- GNIS feature ID: 0284730
- Website: jasper-fl.com

Jasper is a city in and the county seat of Hamilton County, Florida, United States. The population was 3,621 at the 2020 census.

The Old Hamilton County Jail and the First United Methodist Church in Jasper are on the National Register of Historic Places. One of the largest industries is phosphate mining.

== History ==
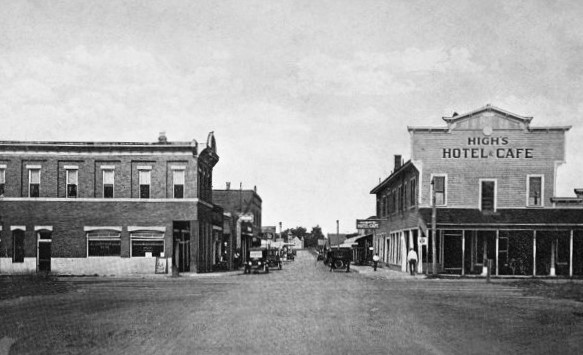
Downtown Jasper around 1928.

Jasper is believed to rest on land originally thought to be the site of the Miccosukee (Mikasuki) people, a subtribe of the Seminole nation. The 1823 Treaty of Moultrie bought the Native American lands, and the population was required to move southeast of the Suwannee River. This allowed white settlers to move into the area. A suspected Native burial mound is located at Baisden Swamp, (named after Josiah Baisden,) just on the outskirts of Jasper. Six miles north of Jasper along the Alapaha River an established Native village called Micco Town, or more accurately, Halata-Micco (Hala-at-a-Micco), and named for Chief Billy Bowlegs of the Seminoles, (who may have resided there,) once stood. Chief Bowlegs signed the 1832 Treaty of Paynes Landing at Hola-at-a-Micco, his "X" mark (aka Billy Bowlegs) establishing the type of Native inhabiting the area where artifacts of pottery, fishing spear points, and arrowheads are often found.

Soon after the Treaty of Moultrie in 1823 was delivered, Hamilton County was established as part of the original 15 counties in Florida. White settlers mostly from Georgia and South Carolina moved into the area in earnest between 1827 through the 1840s during the Florida Territory era. In 1840, the inhabitants were calling the settlement "Pulaski"; others called it "Wall". Daniel Bell, living just outside the settlement in 1824, was county judge in 1828, appointed under the authority of the Acting Territorial Governor McCarty in Tallahassee. In 1839, he was a member of the Territorial Legislative Council. Legend has it that Bell, also considered to be the first settler of the county, disagreed with the names that were coming into use for places in the area. He met with locals (one of them named Simon Whitehurst, one of the few Revolutionary War veterans in Florida, buried in Jasper) and other friends, and decided to submit the name of "Jasper", in honor of Revolutionary War veteran William Jasper, to the territorial capitol in Tallahassee. There the name was registered and incorporated as documented in the Territorial Legislative Journal. In 1841, the Jasper Post Office was established, ending any discussion on names for the community. Florida became a U.S. state in 1845, incorporated as the Town of Jasper in 1850, and thirteen years later, on March 2, 1858, the City of Jasper was officially incorporated as a municipality.

The early history and specific makeup of Jasper is rather vague except for scant records that survived several courthouse fires in the late 1800s. What we do know is that the original community was built about a mile south of its current location, near the site of the present day Hamilton Correctional Institution. The original courthouse and a stockade stood where Evergreen Cemetery is located. The citizens fought Seminole raiding parties throughout the early periods, the last Seminole War ending in 1858. In 1861, the Civil War came to Jasper. The Jasper Blues ("I" Company 2nd Infantry CSA) was created from Jasper and county citizens. The unit rendezvoused west of Jacksonville and were shipped by train to Virginia, arriving on the day of the First Battle of Manassas. They were eventually made a part of the First Corps (Stonewall Jackson's) of the Army of Northern Virginia led by General Robert E. Lee. A school in Jasper was named in Lee's honor and is occupied today by the County School Board Offices.

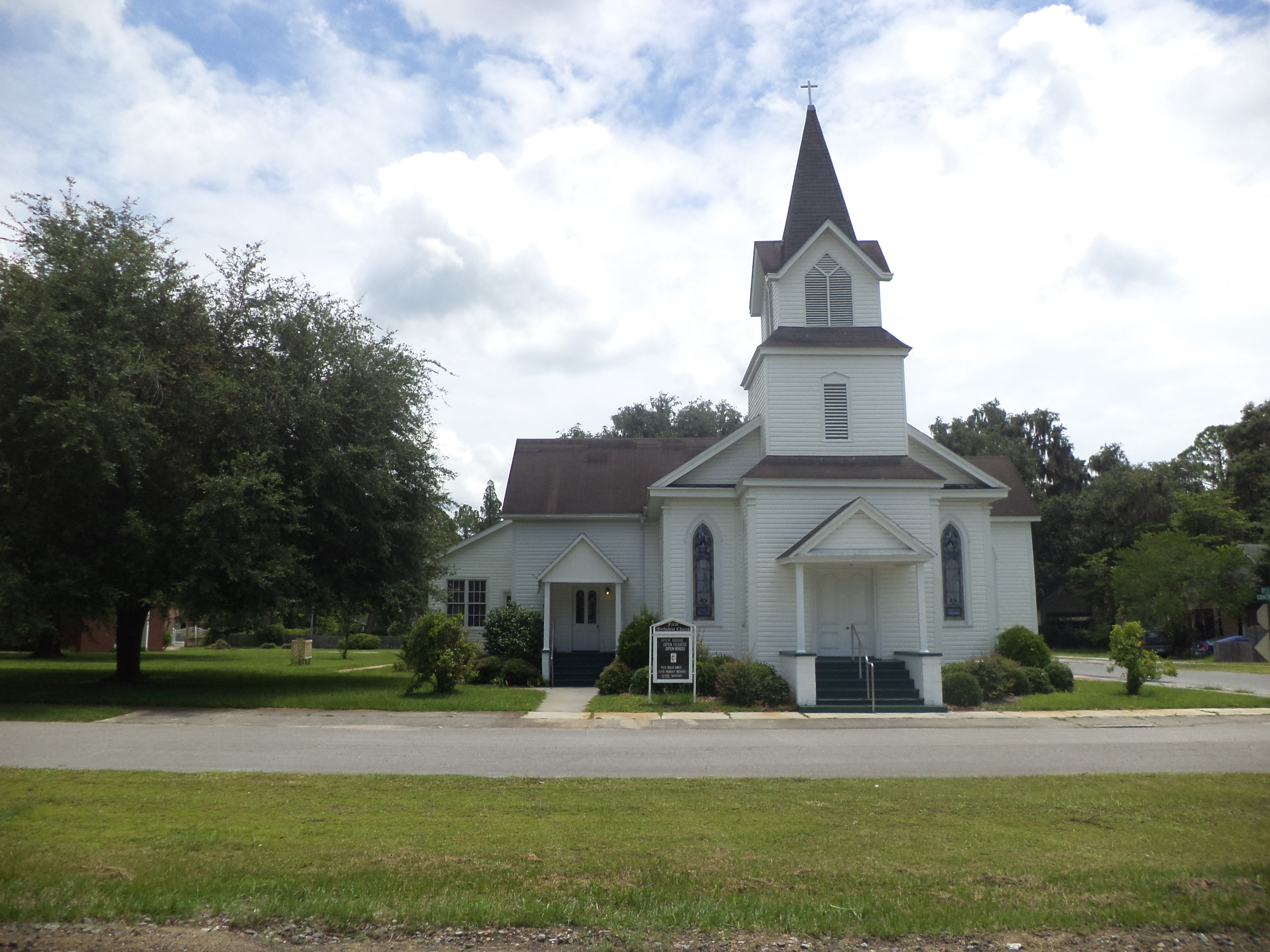
First United Methodist Church

In 1865, the Savannah, Florida and Western Railway was completed, and a depot was built about a mile north of the city center. Businesses and homes migrated toward the railroad, and eventually the current city was established along that line. The city grew in earnest between 1890 and 1930, with a rich trade in turpentine, tobacco, cotton, and pine lumber. Jasper reached its pinnacle in the 1920s, with a booming population of over 2,000. Most of Jasper's present buildings were built during this 40-year period.

Since the 1920s, Jasper has seen many economic changes. The leading cotton industry gave way to the turpentine industry, turpentine to lumber, lumber to tobacco, and finally tobacco to phosphate mining. The completion of Interstate 75 in the late 1950s caused further decline as tourists and shipping bypassed the city.

In 2002, city officials extended the city limits and infrastructure to the intersection of US 129 and Interstate 75, and built infrastructure (water and sewer) with the help of county officials to the Hamilton County Industrial Park along US 41 in order to encourage economic growth and development. Since that time several new businesses have moved into the area, and the new high school has been built along the route.

The large jump in population between 2000 (1,780) and 2010 (4,546) was due to the incorporation of land containing the Hamilton County Correctional Facility into the city limits.

== Geography ==
Jasper is located in central Hamilton County at 30°31′08″N 82°57′04″W. It is set in the North Florida lowlands 90 miles (140 km) west of Jacksonville, 85 miles (137 km) east of Tallahassee, 32 miles (51 km) southeast of Valdosta, Georgia, and 30 miles (48 km) northwest of Lake City. The city is sits on a slightly higher elevated area surrounded by lowland.

U.S. Routes 41 and 129 run concurrently through the center of Jasper. US 41 continues northwest to Jennings and then into Georgia, and southeast to White Springs, while US 129 runs north to Statenville, Georgia and south to Live Oak. Interstate 75 passes close to Jasper, with access from Exit 451 (US 129) 5 miles (8 km) south of the city, and from Exit 460 (Florida State Road 6) 7 miles (11 km) west of city.

According to the U.S. Census Bureau, Jasper has an area of 2.3 square miles (5.9 km^{2}), all of it land.

=== Climate ===
The City of Jasper is part of the humid subtropical climate zone with a Köppen Climate Classification of "Cfa" (C = mild temperate, f = fully humid, and a = hot summer).

Climate data for Jasper, Florida, 1991–2020 normals, extremes 1898–present
Month	Jan	Feb	Mar	Apr	May	Jun	Jul	Aug	Sep	Oct	Nov	Dec	Year
Record high °F (°C)	84 (29)	89 (32)	92 (33)	95 (35)	102 (39)	104 (40)	104 (40)	103 (39)	102 (39)	99 (37)	90 (32)	86 (30)	104 (40)
Mean maximum °F (°C)	78.6 (25.9)	80.7 (27.1)	84.6 (29.2)	87.9 (31.1)	92.9 (33.8)	95.9 (35.5)	96.5 (35.8)	96.0 (35.6)	94.0 (34.4)	89.8 (32.1)	84.2 (29.0)	80.2 (26.8)	97.8 (36.6)
Mean daily maximum °F (°C)	63.0 (17.2)	66.4 (19.1)	72.2 (22.3)	78.0 (25.6)	84.5 (29.2)	88.3 (31.3)	90.2 (32.3)	89.3 (31.8)	86.6 (30.3)	79.9 (26.6)	71.5 (21.9)	65.3 (18.5)	77.9 (25.5)
Daily mean °F (°C)	50.7 (10.4)	53.9 (12.2)	59.0 (15.0)	65.1 (18.4)	72.3 (22.4)	78.0 (25.6)	80.2 (26.8)	79.7 (26.5)	76.5 (24.7)	68.1 (20.1)	58.8 (14.9)	53.1 (11.7)	66.3 (19.1)
Mean daily minimum °F (°C)	38.4 (3.6)	41.3 (5.2)	45.8 (7.7)	52.2 (11.2)	60.2 (15.7)	67.7 (19.8)	70.2 (21.2)	70.1 (21.2)	66.4 (19.1)	56.4 (13.6)	46.0 (7.8)	41.0 (5.0)	54.6 (12.6)
Mean minimum °F (°C)	22.4 (−5.3)	25.6 (−3.6)	30.0 (−1.1)	39.3 (4.1)	48.1 (8.9)	60.0 (15.6)	65.5 (18.6)	64.8 (18.2)	56.8 (13.8)	41.4 (5.2)	30.7 (−0.7)	26.6 (−3.0)	20.9 (−6.2)
Record low °F (°C)	4 (−16)	5 (−15)	19 (−7)	27 (−3)	39 (4)	47 (8)	55 (13)	58 (14)	38 (3)	29 (−2)	15 (−9)	9 (−13)	4 (−16)
Average precipitation inches (mm)	4.60 (117)	4.00 (102)	4.58 (116)	3.77 (96)	3.17 (81)	6.78 (172)	5.88 (149)	6.30 (160)	4.94 (125)	2.87 (73)	2.38 (60)	3.37 (86)	52.64 (1,337)
Average precipitation days (≥ 0.01 in)	8.1	7.6	7.7	5.9	5.7	12.6	13.1	13.7	9.0	5.3	5.4	7.1	101.2
Source: NOAA

== Demographics ==
Historical population
Census	Pop.	Note	%±
1870	138		—
1880	311		125.4%
1900	993		—
1910	1,730		74.2%
1920	1,260		−27.2%
1930	1,748		38.7%
1940	1,722		−1.5%
1950	2,327		35.1%
1960	2,103		−9.6%
1970	2,221		5.6%
1980	2,093		−5.8%
1990	2,099		0.3%
2000	1,780		−15.2%
2010	4,546		155.4%
2020	3,621		−20.3%
U.S. Decennial Census; 1990 2000

=== Racial and ethnic composition ===
Jasper, Florida – Racial and ethnic composition Note: the US Census treats Hispanic/Latino as an ethnic category. This table excludes Latinos from the racial categories and assigns them to a separate category. Hispanics/Latinos may be of any race.
Race / Ethnicity (NH = Non-Hispanic)	Pop 2000	Pop 2010	Pop 2020	% 2000	% 2010	% 2020
White alone (NH)	896	1,809	1,412	50.34%	39.79%	38.99%
Black or African American alone (NH)	811	2,280	1,787	45.56%	50.15%	49.35%
Native American or Alaska Native alone (NH)	1	13	5	0.06%	0.29%	0.14%
Asian alone (NH)	5	23	10	0.28%	0.51%	0.28%
Pacific Islander or Native Hawaiian alone (NH)	0	0	0	0.00%	0.00%	0.00%
Other race alone (NH)	0	4	7	0.00%	0.09%	0.19%
Mixed race or Multiracial (NH)	12	29	64	0.67%	0.64%	1.77%
Hispanic or Latino (any race)	55	388	336	3.09%	8.53%	9.28%
Total	1,780	4,546	3,621	100.00%	100.00%	100.00%

=== 2020 census ===
As of the 2020 census, Jasper had a population of 3,621. The median age was 39.7 years. 11.6% of residents were under the age of 18 and 11.6% were 65 years of age or older. For every 100 females, there were 319.1 males, and for every 100 females age 18 and over, there were 363.4 males.

As of 2020, 0.0% of residents lived in urban areas, while 100.0% lived in rural areas.

In 2020, there were 658 households in Jasper, of which 35.0% had children under the age of 18. Of all households, 28.4% were married-couple households, 21.6% were households with a male householder and no spouse or partner present, and 43.8% were households with a female householder and no spouse or partner present. About 34.0% of all households were made up of individuals, and 18.5% had someone living alone who was 65 years of age or older.

In 2020, there were 799 housing units, of which 17.6% were vacant. The homeowner vacancy rate was 4.2%, and the rental vacancy rate was 8.6%.

=== 2010 census ===
As of the 2010 United States census, there were 4,546 people, 1,208 households, and 679 families residing in the city.

=== 2000 census ===
As of the census of 2000, there were 1,780 people, 742 households, and 488 families residing in the city. The population density was 911.2 inhabitants per square mile (351.8/km^{2}). There were 878 housing units at an average density of 449.4 per square mile (173.5/km^{2}). The racial makeup of the city was 52.25% White, 45.67% African American, 0.06% Native American, 0.28% Asian, 0.73% from other races, and 1.01% from two or more races. Hispanic or Latino of any race were 3.09% of the population.

In 2000, there were 742 households, out of which 28.4% had children under the age of 18 living with them, 37.7% were married couples living together, 23.5% had a female householder with no husband present, and 34.2% were non-families. 31.5% of all households were made up of individuals, and 15.0% had someone living alone who was 65 years of age or older. The average household size was 2.40 and the average family size was 3.01.

In 2000, in the city, the population was spread out, with 29.3% under the age of 18, 8.3% from 18 to 24, 23.3% from 25 to 44, 22.5% from 45 to 64, and 16.6% who were 65 years of age or older. The median age was 35 years. For every 100 females, there were 74.3 males. For every 100 females age 18 and over, there were 69.5 males.

In 2000, the median income for a household in the city was $19,018, and the median income for a family was $23,664. Males had a median income of $30,938 versus $17,244 for females. The per capita income for the city was $12,844. About 30.5% of families and 37.4% of the population were below the poverty line, including 56.5% of those under age 18 and 18.7% of those age 65 or over.

== Education ==
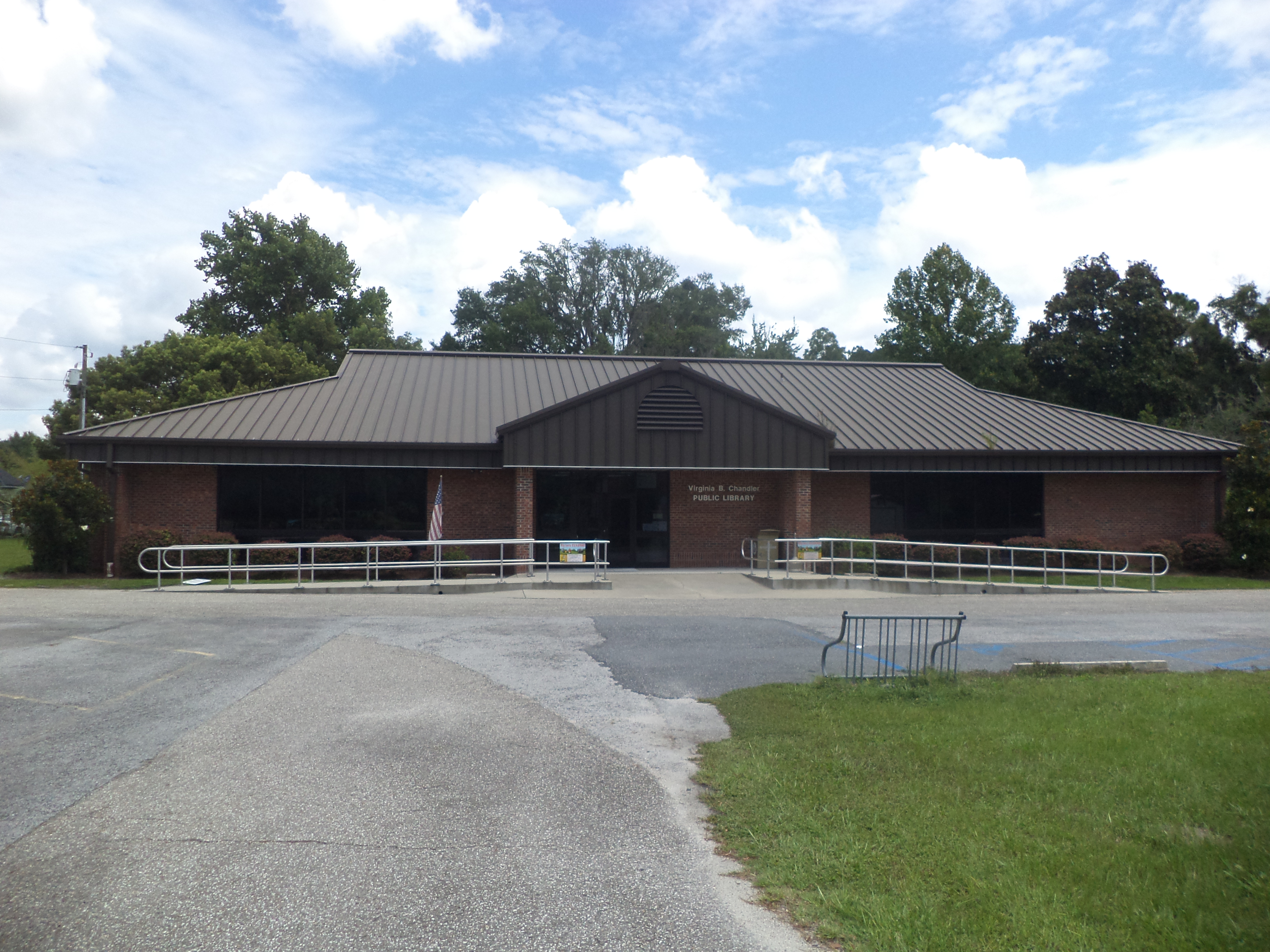
Virginia B. Chandler Public Library

The Hamilton County School District operates the public schools serving Jasper, Hamilton County Elementary School and Hamilton County High School, both in an unincorporated area of the county.

Central Hamilton Elementary School in Jasper previously served the city. It was consolidated into a new elementary school, Hamilton County Elementary School, located in an unincorporated area south of Jasper. Its opening is scheduled for August 2017.

The Suwannee River Regional Library System operates the Jasper Public Library (Virginia B. Chandler Public Library) in Jasper.

== Notable people ==
- Alex J. Brown, former NFL football player for the Chicago Bears and New Orleans Saints
- Don Bryant, former MLB player and bullpen coach
- Marquis Daniels, former NBA guard/forward for the Milwaukee Bucks
- Art Smith, chef of Southern cuisine, frequent guest on The Today Show
- Lillian Smith, author of the 1944 best-seller Strange Fruit, born in Jasper
- Kylie Williams, Miss Florida 2007 and top 15 Miss America

== Local publications ==
- Jasper News – local newspaper for Jasper
