= 1972 United States presidential election in Florida =

- November 7, 1972
- Turnout: ▼72%

Nominee	Richard Nixon	George McGovern
Party	Republican	Democratic
Home state	California	South Dakota
Running mate	Spiro Agnew	Sargent Shriver
Electoral vote	17	0
Popular vote	1,857,759	718,117
Percentage	71.91%	27.80%

Nixon
50–60%
60–70%
70–80%
80–90%
90–100%
President before election
Richard Nixon
Republican
Elected President
Richard Nixon
Republican

The 1972 United States presidential election in Florida was held on November 7, 1972, as part of the concurrent United States presidential election. Florida voters chose seventeen electors, or representatives to the Electoral College, who voted for president and vice president. Incumbent Republican President Richard Nixon won the state over the Democratic nominee, South Dakota Senator George McGovern, by a landslide margin of 44.11% and over one million votes.

After having been among the strongest parts of the Democratic "Solid South" between 1892 and 1944 – except when vehement anti-Catholicism in the Panhandle and urban Republican support gave the state's electoral votes to Herbert Hoover in 1928 – Florida turned into a Republican-leaning state at the presidential level from 1948 due to the growth of a strongly business-oriented society in, and influx of conservative Northern retirees to, newly-developed South Florida following World War II. Aided by this vote, the Republicans carried Florida in all three presidential elections from 1952 to 1960, though North Florida remained Democratic-leaning.

The civil rights movement of the 1960s saw a dramatic change in the next two elections. The classically Deep Southern north of the state, affected by turmoil over school and university desegregation, went powerfully to the staunchly conservative Republican Barry Goldwater in 1964 and then to the segregationist third-party candidacy of George Wallace in 1968. The southern urban areas that had supported the Republicans between 1948 and 1960, meanwhile, contained huge numbers of former Northern retirees hostile to Goldwater's proposed privatization of Social Security, and turned first to Lyndon Johnson before Nixon recaptured most of them for the Republicans in 1968.

The 1972 Democratic presidential primary in Florida saw Wallace easily carry the state (including every county but highly urbanized Dade) in a ballot that also featured a referendum on court-ordered busing, in which more than three-fourths of voters supported a constitutional ban on the practice. McGovern and John Lindsay were supporters of busing who accused even their rivals Hubert Humphrey and Henry M. Jackson of being covert racists for their opposition thereto, while Wallace openly campaigned against it. Wallace, the opponent most feared by Nixon, was paralyzed by an attempted assassination in May, and McGovern won the nomination from powerful support in the Midwestern and Pacific states. Once McGovern won the nomination, he offered Florida Governor Reubin Askew the vice-presidential slot, but Askew turned the position down.

As of 2024, this is the last election in which majority-Black Gadsden County voted for a Republican presidential candidate, and the only election in which a Republican won all of the state's counties. Among white voters, 78% supported Nixon while 22% supported McGovern.

== Primary elections ==
=== Democratic ===
George Wallace would win a plurality of the Democratic Primary vote in all of the counties in the state.

Democratic Primary – March 14, 1972
Party	Candidate	Votes	%
Democratic	George C. Wallace	526,651	41.65%
Democratic	Hubert Humphrey	243,658	18.56%
Democratic	Henry M. Jackson	170,156	13.46%
Democratic	Edmund Muskie	112,523	8.90%
Democratic	John Lindsay	82,386	6.52%
Democratic	George S. McGovern	78,232	6.19%
Democratic	Shirley Chisholm	43,989	3.48%
Democratic	Eugene McCarthy	5,847	0.46%
Democratic	Wilbur Mills	4,539	0.36%
Democratic	Vance Hartke	3,009	0.24%
Democratic	Sam Yorty	2,564	0.20%
Total votes		1,264,554	100

=== Republican ===
Richard Nixon would end up winning a majority of the vote in all counties except for Desoto County.

Republican Primary – March 14, 1972
Party	Candidate	Votes	%
Republican	Richard Nixon (incumbent)	360,278	86.98%
Republican	John M. Ashbrook	36,617	8.84%
Republican	Pete McCloskey	17,312	4.18%
Total votes		414,207	100

== Results ==
Electoral results
Presidential candidate	Party	Home state	Popular vote		Electoral vote	Running mate		
Presidential candidate	Party	Home state	Count	Percentage	Electoral vote	Vice-presidential candidate	Home state	Electoral vote
Richard Nixon (incumbent)	Republican	California	1,857,759	71.91%	17	Spiro Agnew (incumbent)	Maryland	17
George McGovern	Democratic	South Dakota	718,117	27.80%	0	Sargent Shriver	Maryland	0
Various candidates	Write-ins	—	7,407	0.29%	0	—	—	0
Total			2,583,283	100%	17			17
Needed to win					270			270

=== Results by county ===
County	Richard Nixon Republican		George McGovern Democratic		Various candidates Write-ins		Margin		Total votes cast
County	#	%	#	%	#	%	#	%	Total votes cast
Alachua	22,536	56.54%	17,245	43.26%	80	0.20%	5,291	13.28%	39,861
Baker	1,943	83.64%	379	16.32%	1	0.04%	1,564	67.32%	2,323
Bay	20,245	83.80%	3,914	16.20%			16,331	67.60%	24,159
Bradford	3,652	73.67%	1,217	24.55%	88	1.78%	2,435	49.12%	4,957
Brevard	62,773	78.73%	16,854	21.14%	106	0.13%	45,919	57.59%	79,733
Broward	196,528	72.41%	74,127	27.31%	754	0.28%	122,401	45.10%	271,409
Calhoun	2,069	81.68%	461	18.20%	3	0.12%	1,608	63.48%	2,533
Charlotte	12,888	76.64%	3,874	23.04%	55	0.33%	9,014	53.60%	16,817
Citrus	8,848	77.22%	2,607	22.75%	3	0.03%	6,241	54.47%	11,458
Clay	10,467	85.53%	1,748	14.28%	23	0.19%	8,719	71.25%	12,238
Collier	13,501	80.63%	3,201	19.12%	42	0.25%	10,300	61.51%	16,744
Columbia	6,723	80.16%	1,664	19.84%			5,059	60.32%	8,387
Dade	256,529	58.87%	177,693	40.78%	1,541	0.35%	78,836	18.09%	435,763
DeSoto	2,958	77.58%	852	22.34%	3	0.08%	2,106	55.24%	3,813
Dixie	1,628	81.52%	367	18.38%	2	0.10%	1,261	63.14%	1,997
Duval	122,154	72.19%	46,530	27.50%	520	0.31%	75,624	44.69%	169,204
Escambia	56,071	79.57%	14,078	19.98%	315	0.45%	41,993	59.59%	70,464
Flagler	1,409	74.08%	493	25.92%			916	48.16%	1,902
Franklin	2,277	82.14%	490	17.68%	5	0.18%	1,787	64.46%	2,772
Gadsden	5,995	61.01%	3,829	38.97%	2	0.02%	2,166	22.04%	9,826
Gilchrist	1,306	83.45%	247	15.78%	12	0.77%	1,059	67.67%	1,565
Glades	1,019	78.81%	253	19.57%	21	1.62%	766	59.24%	1,293
Gulf	2,628	78.54%	713	21.31%	5	0.15%	1,915	57.23%	3,346
Hamilton	1,741	73.34%	626	26.37%	7	0.29%	1,115	46.97%	2,374
Hardee	3,563	84.57%	647	15.36%	3	0.07%	2,916	69.21%	4,213
Hendry	2,763	78.85%	739	21.09%	2	0.06%	2,024	57.76%	3,504
Hernando	6,296	74.87%	2,110	25.09%	3	0.04%	4,186	49.78%	8,409
Highlands	9,645	79.49%	2,458	20.26%	30	0.25%	7,187	59.23%	12,133
Hillsborough	106,956	70.13%	45,305	29.71%	249	0.16%	61,651	40.42%	152,510
Holmes	3,819	92.51%	309	7.49%			3,510	85.02%	4,128
Indian River	11,741	77.85%	3,316	21.99%	25	0.17%	8,425	55.86%	15,082
Jackson	8,904	79.99%	2,220	19.94%	8	0.07%	6,684	60.05%	11,132
Jefferson	2,108	66.04%	1,049	32.86%	35	1.10%	1,059	33.18%	3,192
Lafayette	1,060	85.69%	173	13.99%	4	0.32%	887	71.70%	1,237
Lake	23,079	82.63%	4,803	17.20%	48	0.17%	18,276	65.43%	27,930
Lee	36,738	79.46%	9,404	20.34%	93	0.20%	27,334	59.12%	46,235
Leon	27,479	63.72%	15,555	36.07%	92	0.21%	11,924	27.65%	43,126
Levy	3,273	79.12%	862	20.84%	2	0.05%	2,411	58.28%	4,137
Liberty	1,199	84.38%	222	15.62%			977	68.76%	1,421
Madison	3,236	72.92%	1,187	26.75%	15	0.34%	2,049	46.17%	4,438
Manatee	32,664	79.79%	8,058	19.68%	218	0.53%	24,606	60.11%	40,940
Marion	19,505	78.18%	5,397	21.63%	46	0.18%	14,108	56.55%	24,948
Martin	11,296	78.83%	2,946	20.56%	88	0.61%	8,350	58.27%	14,330
Monroe	11,688	72.18%	4,469	27.60%	36	0.22%	7,219	44.58%	16,193
Nassau	5,078	79.44%	1,293	20.23%	21	0.33%	3,785	59.21%	6,392
Okaloosa	23,303	88.64%	2,843	10.81%	144	0.55%	20,460	77.83%	26,290
Okeechobee	2,581	80.58%	621	19.39%	1	0.03%	1,960	61.19%	3,203
Orange	94,516	79.57%	23,840	20.07%	421	0.35%	70,676	59.50%	118,777
Osceola	9,320	82.94%	1,875	16.69%	42	0.37%	7,445	66.25%	11,237
Palm Beach	108,670	72.35%	40,825	27.18%	708	0.47%	67,845	45.17%	150,203
Pasco	29,249	71.91%	11,330	27.85%	97	0.24%	17,919	44.06%	40,676
Pinellas	179,541	69.83%	77,197	30.02%	378	0.15%	102,344	39.81%	257,116
Polk	60,748	78.42%	16,419	21.20%	293	0.38%	44,329	57.22%	77,460
Putnam	8,741	74.61%	2,901	24.76%	74	0.63%	5,840	49.85%	11,716
St. John's	8,919	77.48%	2,549	22.14%	43	0.37%	6,370	55.34%	11,511
St. Lucie	14,258	75.40%	4,593	24.29%	59	0.31%	9,665	51.11%	18,910
Santa Rosa	12,669	88.94%	1,491	10.47%	85	0.60%	11,178	78.47%	14,245
Sarasota	48,939	79.95%	12,235	19.99%	36	0.06%	36,704	59.96%	61,210
Seminole	27,658	80.84%	6,503	19.01%	51	0.15%	21,155	61.83%	34,212
Sumter	3,695	76.71%	1,107	22.98%	15	0.31%	2,588	53.73%	4,817
Suwannee	4,435	80.77%	1,027	18.70%	29	0.53%	3,408	62.07%	5,491
Taylor	4,109	84.50%	754	15.50%			3,355	69.00%	4,863
Union	1,314	83.85%	253	16.15%			1,061	67.70%	1,567
Volusia	52,656	70.60%	21,637	29.01%	290	0.39%	31,019	41.59%	74,583
Wakulla	2,466	82.01%	539	17.92%	2	0.07%	1,927	64.09%	3,007
Walton	6,217	85.93%	988	13.66%	30	0.41%	5,229	72.27%	7,235
Washington	3,777	86.11%	606	13.82%	3	0.07%	3,171	72.29%	4,386
Totals	1,857,759	71.91%	718,117	27.80%	7,407	0.29%	1,139,642	44.11%	2,583,283

=== By congressional district ===
Nixon won all 15 congressional districts, including 11 held by Democrats.

District	Nixon	McGovern
1st	83.7%	16.3%
2nd	68.6%	31.4%
3rd	69.8%	30.2%
4th	76.5%	23.5%
5th	76.3%	23.7%
6th	69.4%	30.6%
7th	69.7%	30.3%
8th	79.4%	20.6%
9th	80.5%	19.5%
10th	79.2%	20.8%
11th	74.2%	25.8%
12th	72%	28%
13th	55.5%	44.5%
14th	58.1%	41.9%
15th	63.4%	36.6%

== Analysis ==
Incumbent President Nixon overwhelmingly won the state of Florida with 71.91% of the vote, carrying all of Florida's 67 counties (the last time any presidential candidate has won every single county in the state) and seventeen electoral votes. This made Florida about 21% more Republican than the nation-at-large, the farthest to the right of the nation it has ever voted. Nixon's victory in Florida made it his fifth strongest state after Mississippi, Georgia, Oklahoma and Alabama. McGovern reached 40% of the vote only in Dade County with its substantial Jewish and Latin populations, plus Alachua County with its large population of liberal college students who were a major base for his candidacy – and the Democratic candidate only reached thirty percent of the vote in four other counties. Nixon's message enabled him to capture virtually all of the Wallace vote from 1968, as shown by the fact that pineywoods Holmes County, which had been Wallace's fifth-strongest county in 1968, was to be Nixon's fourth-best county in 1972 with over 92% of the vote.

In addition to hostility towards busing and the "acid, amnesty and abortion" policies which Nixon consistently accused McGovern of despite eventual running mate Sargent Shriver being firmly opposed to abortion, the Democratic campaign in Florida was also crippled by McGovern's policy of normalizing relationships with Fidel Castro's Cuba. Relationships with Cuba were a hotbed issue in the most liberal and least Southern region of the state around Miami, and drove even many voters who had supported Humphrey in 1968 to Nixon and the Republican Party. This allowed the GOP to carry Monroe County, which had consistently voted Democratic since 1888.

== Works cited ==
- Black, Earl; Black, Merle (1992). The Vital South: How Presidents Are Elected. Harvard University Press. ISBN 0674941306.
