= 1980 United States presidential election in Florida =

- November 4, 1980
- Turnout: 77%

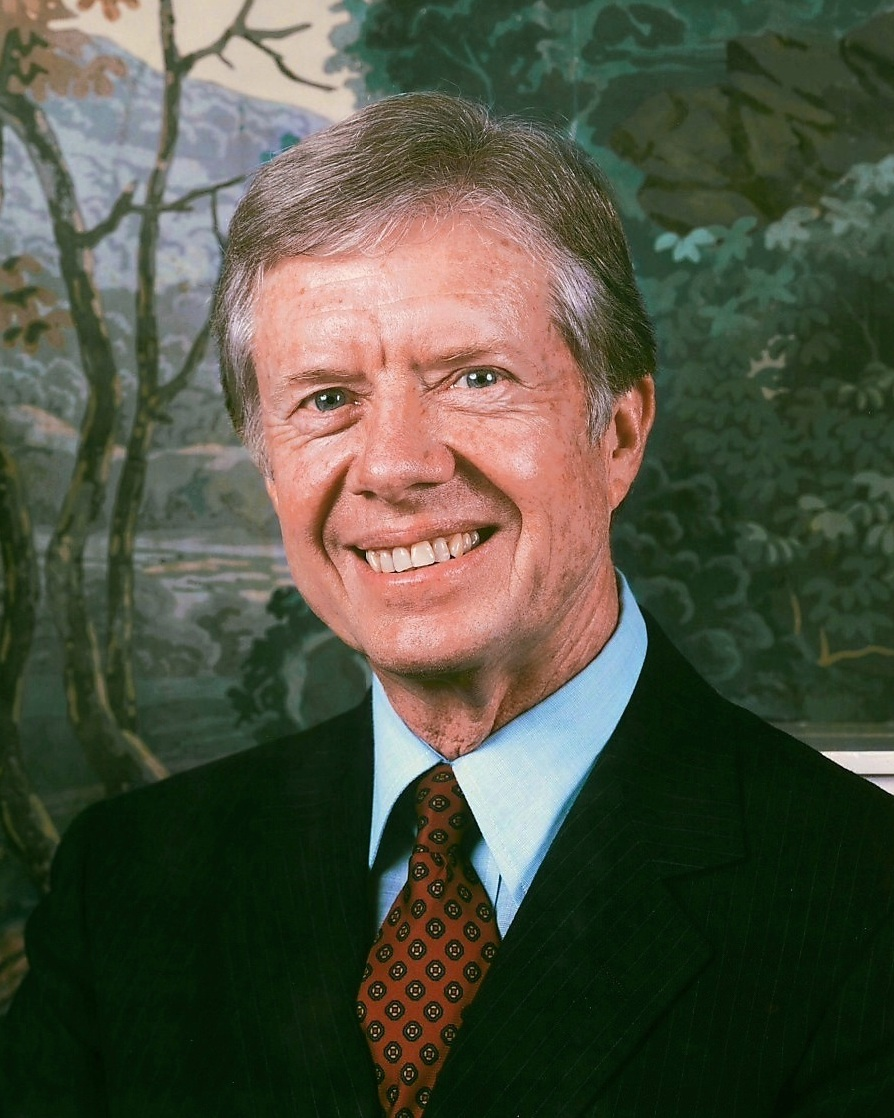

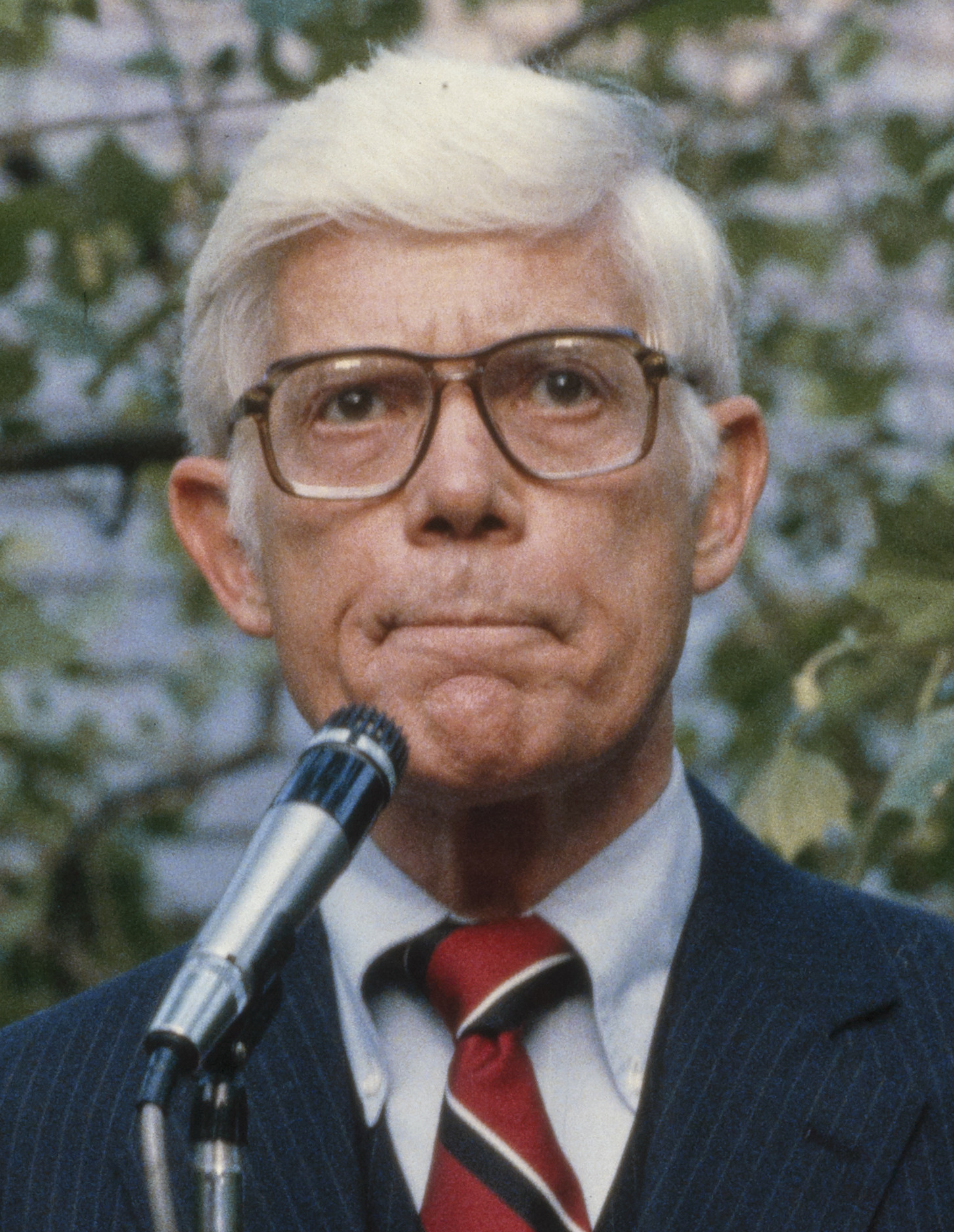
Nominee	Ronald Reagan	Jimmy Carter	John B. Anderson
Party	Republican	Democratic	Independent
Home state	California	Georgia	Illinois
Running mate	George H. W. Bush	Walter Mondale	Patrick Lucey
Electoral vote	17	0	0
Popular vote	2,046,951	1,419,475	189,692
Percentage	55.52%	38.50%	5.14%
County results
Reagan
40–50%
50–60%
60–70%
70–80%
Carter
40–50%
50–60%
60–70%
President before election
Jimmy Carter
Democratic
Elected President
Ronald Reagan
Republican

The 1980 United States presidential election in Florida took place on Tuesday, November 4, 1980, as part of the 1980 United States presidential election in which all 50 states plus the District of Columbia participated. Florida voters chose 17 electors to represent them in the Electoral College via a popular vote pitting incumbent Democratic President Jimmy Carter and his running mate, Vice President Walter Mondale, against Republican challenger and former California Governor Ronald Reagan and his running mate and former Director of the CIA, George H. W. Bush.

The Republican ticket won Florida by a wide 17.02% margin, a particularly strong performance in this conservative leaning state that voted for Carter in 1976 by a 5.29% margin. John B. Anderson, a liberal Republican Congressman from Illinois who ran as an independent with former U.S. Ambassador to Mexico Patrick Lucey, received his strongest performance of any former Confederate state in Florida, where he won 5.14% of the vote. Florida, along with Virginia, were one of only two southern states to give Anderson over 5% of the vote. Although Carter lost Florida, he is the last Democrat to win a majority of counties in the state's northern region. As of the 2024 presidential election, this is also the last time for a Democrat to win the counties of Baker, Bradford, Columbia, Jackson, Lafayette, Liberty, Suwannee, and Union. This cycle also marks the most recent time that an incumbent president standing for re-election would fail to carry Florida, irrespective of the national outcome.

Reagan's victory was the first of four consecutive Republican victories in the state, as Florida would not vote Democratic again until Bill Clinton won the state in his re-election bid in 1996. Whether Florida is a swing state or a Republican-leaning state today is disputed among political observers.

Among white voters, 62% supported Reagan while 31% supported Carter.

== Results ==
=== Primary election results ===
==== Republican ====
The Republican primary was held on March 11, 1980. Ronald Reagan won the Florida primary.

1980 Florida Republican presidential primary results
Candidate	Votes received	
Candidate	#	%
Ronald Reagan	345,093	56.2%
George H. W. Bush	185,527	30.2%
John B. Anderson	56,447	9.2%
Phil Crane	11,974	2.0%
Howard H. Baker, Jr.	6,294	1.0%
John B. Connally	4,909	0.8%
Harold Stassen	1,365	0.2%
Bob Dole	1,081	0.2%

==== Democratic ====
The Democratic presidential primary was also held on March 11, 1980. Incumbent president Jimmy Carter won the Florida primary.

1980 Florida Democratic presidential primary results
Candidate	Votes received	
Candidate	#	%
Jimmy Carter	665,683	60.6%
Ted Kennedy	256,564	23.3%
Jerry Brown	53,422	4.9%
Richard B. Kay	19,148	1.7%
No preference	104,252	9.5%

=== General election results ===
Electoral results
Presidential candidate	Party	Home state	Popular vote		Electoral vote	Running mate		
Presidential candidate	Party	Home state	Count	Percentage	Electoral vote	Vice-presidential candidate	Home state	Electoral vote
Ronald Reagan	Republican	California	2,046,951	55.52%	17	George H. W. Bush	Texas	17
Jimmy Carter (incumbent)	Democrat	Georgia	1,419,475	38.50%	0	Walter Mondale (incumbent)	Minnesota	0
John B. Anderson	Independent	Illinois	189,692	5.14%	0	Patrick Lucey	Wisconsin	0
Ed Clark	Libertarian	California	30,524	0.83%	0	David Koch	New York	0
David McReynolds	Socialist	New York	212	0.01%	0	Diane Drufenbrock	Wisconsin	0
Gus Hall	Communist	New York	123	0.00%	0	Angela Davis	California	0
Clifton DeBerry	Socialist Workers	California	41	0.00%	0	Matilde Zimmermann	—	0
Deirdre Griswold	Workers World	New York	8	0.00%	0	Larry Holmes	Illinois	0
Total			3,687,026	100%	17			17
Needed to win					270			270

==== Results by county ====
County	Ronald Reagan Republican		Jimmy Carter Democratic		John B. Anderson Independent		Various candidates Other parties		Margin		Total votes cast
County	#	%	#	%	#	%	#	%	#	%	Total votes cast
Alachua	19,804	38.56%	26,849	52.27%	4,178	8.13%	533	1.04%	-7,045	-13.71%	51,364
Baker	2,283	45.88%	2,611	52.47%	56	1.13%	26	0.52%	-328	-6.59%	4,976
Bay	20,948	60.61%	12,389	35.85%	740	2.14%	484	1.40%	8,559	24.76%	34,561
Bradford	2,778	44.50%	3,347	53.61%	90	1.44%	28	0.45%	-569	-9.11%	6,243
Brevard	69,460	60.07%	39,007	33.73%	5,866	5.07%	1,303	1.13%	30,453	26.34%	115,636
Broward	229,693	55.95%	146,323	35.64%	31,554	7.69%	2,991	0.73%	83,370	20.31%	410,561
Calhoun	1,504	38.72%	2,300	59.22%	52	1.34%	28	0.72%	-796	-20.50%	3,884
Charlotte	20,486	64.62%	9,769	30.82%	1,210	3.82%	235	0.74%	10,717	33.80%	31,700
Citrus	14,286	58.48%	9,162	37.50%	787	3.22%	195	0.80%	5,124	20.98%	24,430
Clay	15,643	64.85%	7,630	31.63%	692	2.87%	157	0.65%	8,013	33.22%	24,122
Collier	23,900	71.10%	7,739	23.02%	1,678	4.99%	296	0.88%	16,161	48.08%	33,613
Columbia	5,643	48.45%	5,680	48.76%	248	2.13%	77	0.66%	-37	-0.31%	11,648
Dade	265,888	50.65%	210,868	40.17%	44,799	8.53%	3,350	0.64%	55,020	10.48%	524,905
DeSoto	3,356	53.40%	2,713	43.17%	155	2.47%	61	0.97%	643	10.23%	6,285
Dixie	1,101	34.70%	2,010	63.35%	45	1.42%	17	0.54%	-909	-28.65%	3,173
Duval	98,664	50.45%	90,466	46.26%	5,184	2.65%	1,240	0.63%	8,198	4.19%	195,554
Escambia	51,794	58.49%	33,513	37.84%	2,634	2.97%	618	0.70%	18,281	20.65%	88,559
Flagler	2,895	51.70%	2,503	44.70%	154	2.75%	48	0.86%	392	7.00%	5,600
Franklin	1,508	44.59%	1,775	52.48%	54	1.60%	45	1.33%	-267	-7.89%	3,382
Gadsden	3,718	30.41%	8,222	67.26%	201	1.64%	84	0.69%	-4,504	-36.85%	12,225
Gilchrist	1,093	39.13%	1,627	58.25%	56	2.01%	17	0.61%	-534	-19.12%	2,793
Glades	1,098	45.96%	1,203	50.36%	61	2.55%	27	1.13%	-105	-4.40%	2,389
Gulf	2,127	43.18%	2,700	54.81%	61	1.24%	38	0.77%	-573	-11.63%	4,926
Hamilton	1,301	39.66%	1,923	58.63%	40	1.22%	16	0.49%	-622	-18.97%	3,280
Hardee	2,603	48.82%	2,599	48.74%	83	1.56%	47	0.88%	4	0.08%	5,332
Hendry	2,703	49.93%	2,543	46.97%	131	2.42%	37	0.68%	160	2.96%	5,414
Hernando	12,115	54.99%	8,858	40.21%	852	3.87%	207	0.94%	3,257	14.78%	22,032
Highlands	11,925	61.95%	6,688	34.74%	531	2.76%	105	0.55%	5,237	27.21%	19,249
Hillsborough	106,160	51.71%	88,271	42.99%	8,965	4.37%	1,918	0.93%	17,889	8.72%	205,314
Holmes	3,221	52.41%	2,767	45.02%	69	1.12%	89	1.45%	454	7.39%	6,146
Indian River	15,568	62.98%	7,759	31.39%	1,185	4.79%	205	0.83%	7,809	31.59%	24,717
Jackson	6,348	44.76%	7,567	53.36%	159	1.12%	107	0.75%	-1,219	-8.60%	14,181
Jefferson	1,623	39.19%	2,367	57.16%	96	2.32%	55	1.33%	-744	-17.97%	4,141
Lafayette	795	42.67%	1,034	55.50%	22	1.18%	12	0.64%	-239	-12.83%	1,863
Lake	26,798	64.53%	13,128	31.61%	1,244	3.00%	358	0.86%	13,670	32.92%	41,528
Lee	61,033	64.51%	28,125	29.73%	4,229	4.47%	1,226	1.30%	32,908	34.78%	94,613
Leon	24,919	43.47%	28,450	49.63%	3,193	5.57%	764	1.33%	-3,531	-6.16%	57,326
Levy	3,210	42.26%	4,170	54.90%	175	2.30%	41	0.54%	-960	-12.64%	7,596
Liberty	899	43.81%	1,114	54.29%	25	1.22%	14	0.68%	-215	-10.48%	2,052
Madison	2,280	41.39%	3,134	56.89%	65	1.18%	30	0.54%	-854	-15.50%	5,509
Manatee	40,535	61.81%	21,679	33.06%	2,928	4.47%	434	0.66%	18,856	28.75%	65,576
Marion	23,743	58.49%	15,400	37.94%	1,187	2.92%	262	0.65%	8,343	20.55%	40,592
Martin	20,521	68.05%	8,087	26.82%	1,321	4.38%	225	0.75%	12,434	41.23%	30,154
Monroe	11,644	53.40%	7,920	36.32%	1,932	8.86%	310	1.42%	3,724	17.08%	21,806
Nassau	5,440	50.60%	5,074	47.20%	183	1.70%	54	0.50%	366	3.40%	10,751
Okaloosa	28,072	69.62%	10,845	26.90%	1,116	2.77%	290	0.72%	17,227	42.72%	40,323
Okeechobee	2,783	44.81%	3,228	51.98%	156	2.51%	43	0.69%	-445	-7.17%	6,210
Orange	87,454	61.06%	48,767	34.05%	5,403	3.77%	1,595	1.11%	38,687	27.01%	143,219
Osceola	10,863	59.67%	6,603	36.27%	564	3.10%	175	0.96%	4,260	23.40%	18,205
Palm Beach	143,639	56.79%	91,991	36.37%	15,193	6.01%	2,107	0.83%	51,648	20.42%	252,930
Pasco	50,120	56.67%	34,054	38.50%	3,569	4.04%	699	0.79%	16,066	18.17%	88,442
Pinellas	185,728	53.83%	138,428	40.12%	17,839	5.17%	3,008	0.87%	47,300	13.71%	345,003
Polk	59,651	56.11%	43,327	40.75%	2,627	2.47%	710	0.67%	16,324	15.36%	106,315
Putnam	8,273	46.67%	8,906	50.24%	414	2.34%	134	0.76%	-633	-3.57%	17,727
St. Johns	11,234	59.67%	6,898	36.64%	554	2.94%	140	0.74%	4,336	23.03%	18,826
St. Lucie	18,126	60.76%	10,347	34.69%	1,113	3.73%	244	0.82%	7,779	26.07%	29,830
Santa Rosa	13,802	63.93%	6,964	32.26%	606	2.81%	218	1.01%	6,838	31.67%	21,590
Sarasota	68,065	68.57%	25,621	25.81%	4,796	4.83%	783	0.79%	42,444	42.76%	99,265
Seminole	39,989	66.16%	17,443	28.86%	2,459	4.07%	548	0.91%	22,546	37.30%	60,439
Sumter	3,671	44.41%	4,380	52.98%	141	1.71%	75	0.91%	-709	-8.57%	8,267
Suwannee	3,899	46.22%	4,345	51.51%	135	1.60%	57	0.68%	-446	-5.29%	8,436
Taylor	2,776	47.31%	2,963	50.49%	78	1.33%	51	0.87%	-187	-3.18%	5,868
Union	1,123	46.35%	1,237	51.05%	45	1.86%	18	0.74%	-114	-4.70%	2,423
Volusia	52,663	51.69%	44,513	43.69%	3,310	3.25%	1,396	1.37%	8,150	8.00%	101,882
Wakulla	2,021	47.26%	2,082	48.69%	112	2.62%	61	1.43%	-61	-1.43%	4,276
Walton	4,694	50.28%	4,360	46.70%	199	2.13%	83	0.89%	334	3.58%	9,336
Washington	3,251	49.92%	3,110	47.75%	93	1.43%	59	0.91%	141	2.17%	6,513
Totals	2,046,951	55.52%	1,419,475	38.50%	189,692	5.14%	30,908	0.84%	627,476	17.02%	3,687,026

==== Results by congressional district ====
Ronald Reagan won a majority of the vote in the majority of the congressional districts. Source:

District	Reagan	Carter	Representative
1st	54.7%	43.2%	Earl Hutto
2nd	42.2%	53.6%	Don Fuqua
3rd	46.6%	51.1%	Charles E. Bennett
4th	57.1%	39.8%	Bill Chappell
5th	59.2%	36.9%	Richard Kelly (96th Congress)
5th	59.2%	36.9%	Bill McCollum (97th Congress)
6th	53.3%	41.5%	Bill Young
7th	52.5%	43.0%	Sam Gibbons
8th	59.9%	36.4%	Andy Ireland
9th	62.6%	32.8%	Bill Nelson
10th	64.8%	30.9%	Skip Bafalis
11th	57.1%	36.3%	Dan Mica
12th	56.1%	36.3%	Edward J. Stack (96th Congress)
12th	56.1%	36.3%	Clay Shaw (97th Congress)
13th	41.8%	50.2%	William Lehman
14th	55.2%	37.9%	Claude Pepper
15th	55.7%	34.2%	Dante Fascell

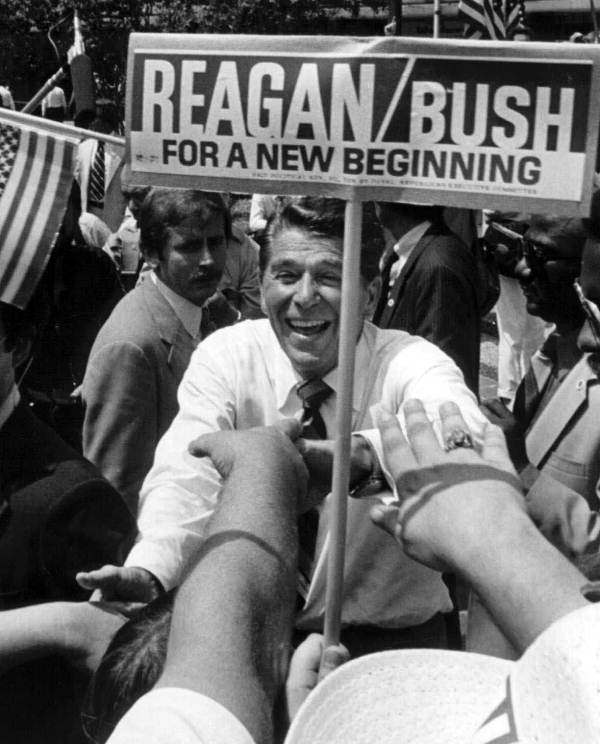
Ronald Reagan campaigning in Florida.

== Works cited ==
- Black, Earl; Black, Merle (1992). The Vital South: How Presidents Are Elected. Harvard University Press. ISBN 0674941306.
