= Whispering Pines =

Whispering Pines may refer to:

== Places in the United States ==
- Whispering Pines, Arizona
- Whispering Pines, California
- Whispering Pines, Florida
- Whispering Pines, North Carolina

== Other uses ==
- Whispering Pines: Live at the Getaway, an album by Richard Manuel
- Whispering Pines/Clinton Indian Band, a member of the Secwepemc (Shuswap) Nation in British Columbia, Canada
- "Whispering Pines," a late 1950s song by Johnny Horton
- "Whispering Pines" (The Band song), a song by Richard Manuel and Robbie Robertson of The Band
- Whispering Pines, a video exhibition by Shana Moulton
