= Okeechobee County, Florida =

County in Florida, United States

County of Okeechobee
- County
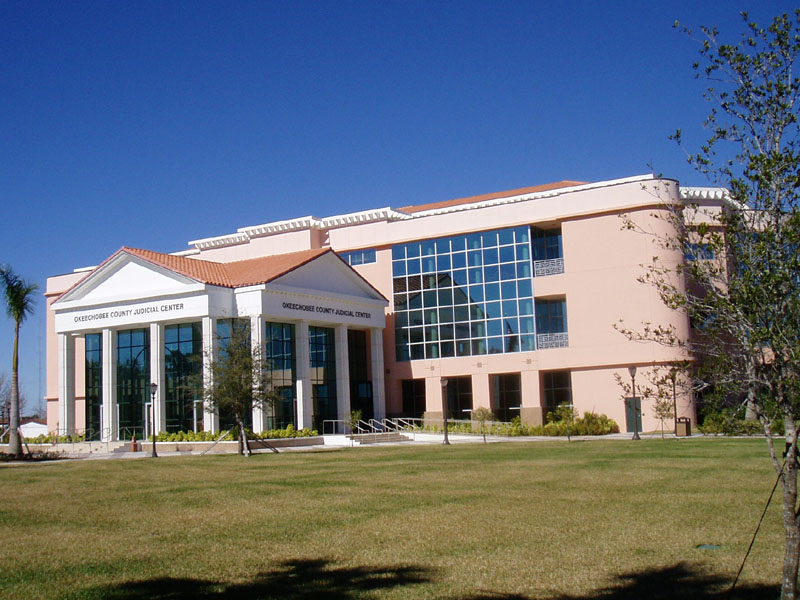
- The Okeechobee County Judicial Center, in Okeechobee

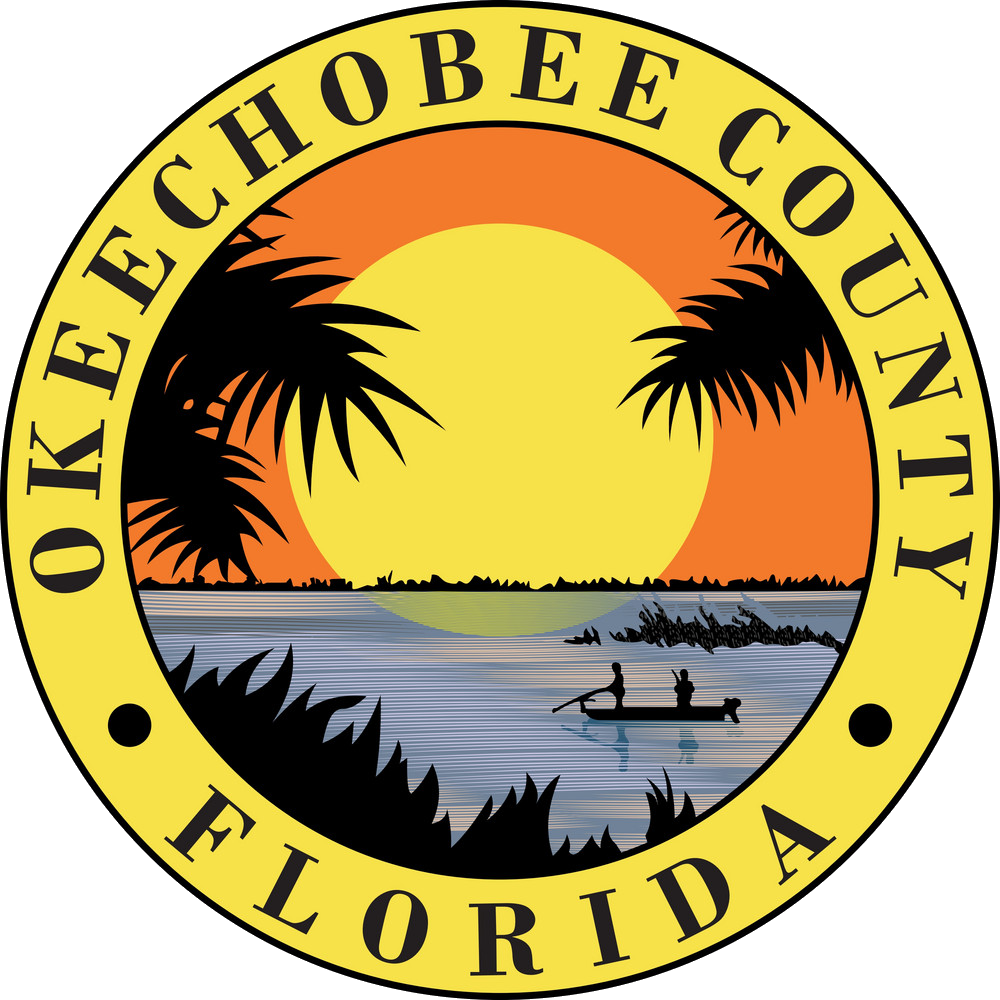
- Seal

- Location within the U.S. state of Florida
- Coordinates: 27°23′N 80°53′W
- Country: United States
- State: Florida
- Founded: May 8, 1917
- Named for: Lake Okeechobee
- Seat: Okeechobee
- Largest city: Okeechobee

Area
  - Total: 892 sq mi (2,310 km^{2})
  - Land: 769 sq mi (1,990 km^{2})
  - Water: 123 sq mi (320 km^{2}) 13.8%

Population (2020)
  - Total: 39,644
  - Estimate (2025): 42,608 ▲
  - Density: 51.6/sq mi (19.9/km^{2})
- Time zone: UTC−5 (Eastern)
  - Summer (DST): UTC−4 (EDT)
- ZIP Codes: 34972, 34973, 34974
- Area code: 863
- Congressional district: 18th
- Website: www.okeechobeecountyfl.gov

Okeechobee County (US: /oʊkiˈtʃoʊbi/) is a county located in the Florida Heartland region of the state of Florida. As of the 2020 census, the population was 39,644. The county seat is Okeechobee.

== History ==
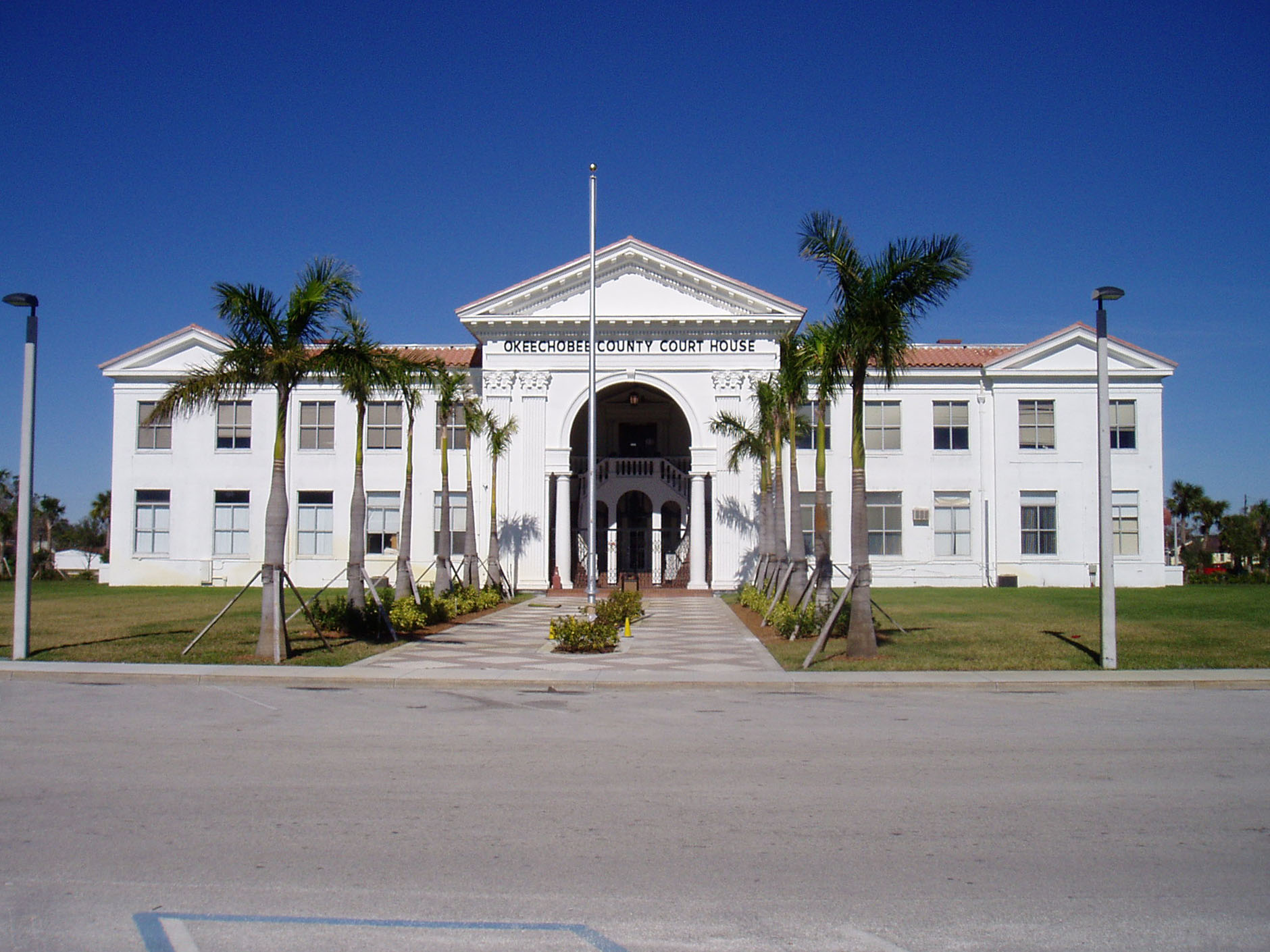
The Okeechobee County Courthouse, constructed in 1926, is located in the county seat, Okeechobee.

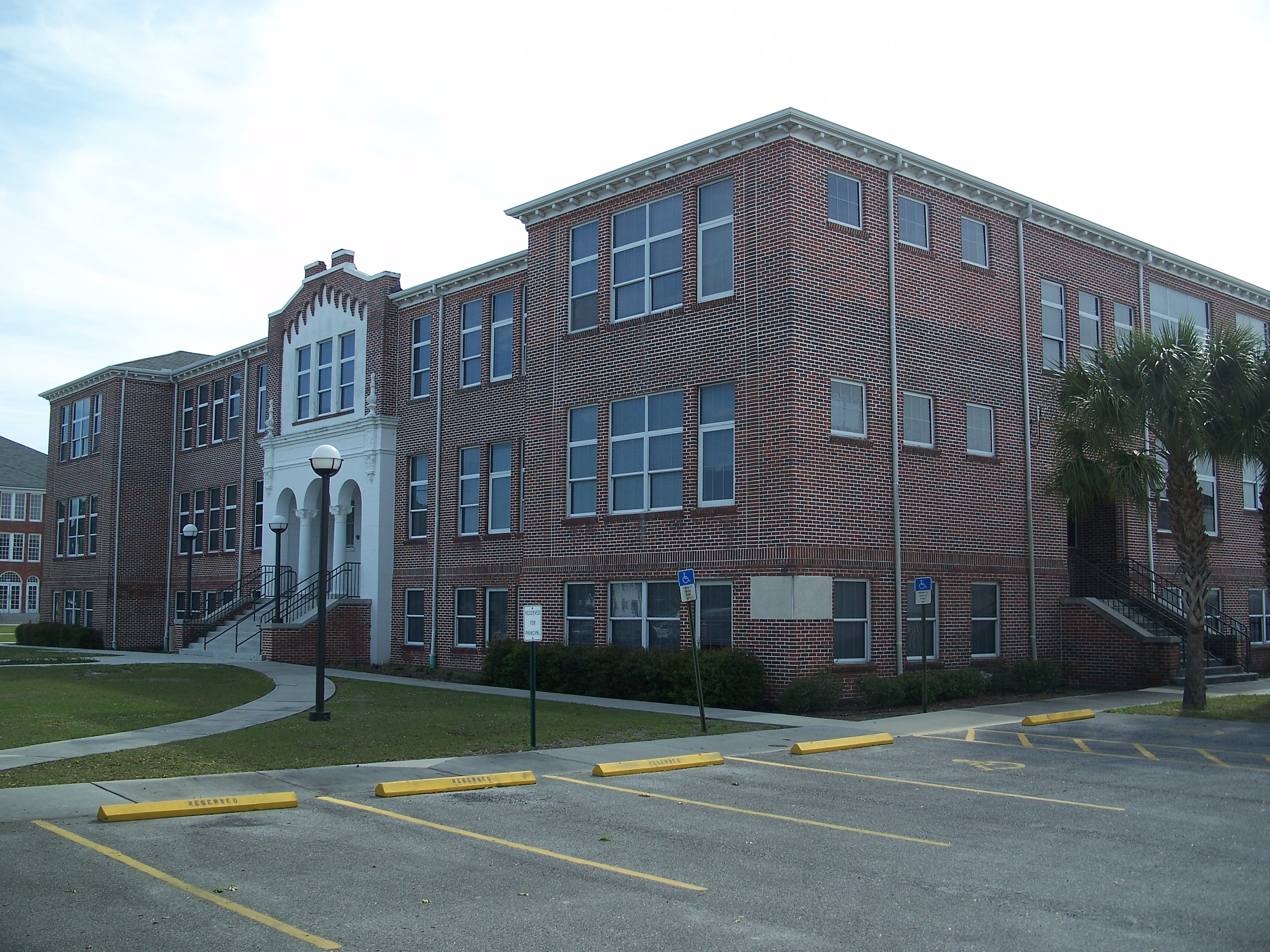
The Old Okeechobee High School, now the Freshman Campus, built 1925

Okeechobee County was incorporated in 1917. It was named for Lake Okeechobee, which was itself named for the Seminole Indian words okee (water) and chobee (big).

=== Historic buildings ===
Historic buildings in Okeechobee County include:

- First United Methodist Church, 1924
- Freedman-Raulerson House, 1923
- Okeechobee County Courthouse, 1926

== Geography ==
According to the U.S. Census Bureau, the county has a total area of 892 square miles (2,310 km^{2}), of which 769 square miles (1,990 km^{2}) is land and 123 square miles (320 km^{2}) (13.8%) is water.

Okeechobee County comprises the Okeechobee, FL Micropolitan Statistical Area (μSA), which is included in the Miami-Fort Lauderdale-Port St. Lucie, FL Combined Statistical Area. The μSA was first designated by the U.S. Office of Management and Budget in 2003.

=== Adjacent counties ===
- Indian River County - northeast
- Martin County - east
- St. Lucie County - east
- Glades County - southwest
- Hendry County - southwest via 5 county intersection in middle of Lake Okeechobee
- Highlands County - west
- Palm Beach County- Southeast via 5 county intersection in middle of Lake Okeechobee
- Polk County - northwest
- Osceola County - northwest

== Points of interest ==
The Lake Okeechobee Scenic Trail, part of the Florida National Scenic Trail, runs along the Herbert Hoover Dike around the Lake.

== Transportation ==
=== Airports ===
- Okeechobee County Airport

=== Major highways ===
- Florida's Turnpike
- US 98
- US 441
- CR 68
- SR 70
- SR 78
- SR 710

== Demographics ==
Historical population
Census	Pop.	Note	%±
1920	2,132		—
1930	4,129		93.7%
1940	3,000		−27.3%
1950	3,454		15.1%
1960	6,424		86.0%
1970	11,233		74.9%
1980	20,264		80.4%
1990	29,627		46.2%
2000	35,910		21.2%
2010	39,996		11.4%
2020	39,644		−0.9%
2025 (est.)	42,608	▲	7.5%
U.S. Decennial Census; 1790-1960 1900-1990; 1990-2000 2010-2019

=== 2020 census ===
As of the 2020 census, the county had a population of 39,644 across 14,433 households and 9,837 families. The median age was 42.2 years. 22.0% of residents were under the age of 18 and 20.7% of residents were 65 years of age or older. For every 100 females there were 113.2 males, and for every 100 females age 18 and over there were 113.9 males age 18 and over.

The racial makeup of the county was 68.9% White, 8.6% Black or African American, 1.0% American Indian and Alaska Native, 0.8% Asian, <0.1% Native Hawaiian and Pacific Islander, 10.1% from some other race, and 10.4% from two or more races. Hispanic or Latino residents of any race comprised 24.9% of the population.

63.6% of residents lived in urban areas, while 36.4% lived in rural areas.

Of the 14,433 households in the county, 30.5% had children under the age of 18 living in them. Of all households, 45.8% were married-couple households, 20.4% were households with a male householder and no spouse or partner present, and 25.6% were households with a female householder and no spouse or partner present. About 26.8% of all households were made up of individuals and 14.3% had someone living alone who was 65 years of age or older.

There were 18,484 housing units, of which 21.9% were vacant. Among occupied housing units, 73.4% were owner-occupied and 26.6% were renter-occupied. The homeowner vacancy rate was 2.5% and the rental vacancy rate was 10.6%.

=== Racial and ethnic composition ===
Okeechobee County, Florida – Racial and ethnic composition Note: the US Census treats Hispanic/Latino as an ethnic category. This table excludes Latinos from the racial categories and assigns them to a separate category. Hispanics/Latinos may be of any race.
Race / Ethnicity (NH = Non-Hispanic)	Pop 1980	Pop 1990	Pop 2000	Pop 2010	Pop 2020	% 1980	% 1990	% 2000	% 2010	% 2020
White alone (NH)	17,448	23,940	25,699	26,258	24,671	86.10%	80.80%	71.57%	65.65%	62.23%
Black or African American alone (NH)	1,696	1,875	2,796	3,117	3,318	8.37%	6.33%	7.79%	7.79%	8.37%
Native American or Alaska Native alone (NH)	79	127	148	287	263	0.39%	0.43%	0.41%	0.72%	0.66%
Asian alone (NH)	63	148	228	345	332	0.31%	0.50%	0.63%	0.86%	0.84%
Native Hawaiian or Pacific Islander alone (NH)	x	x	14	25	14	x	x	0.04%	0.06%	0.04%
Other race alone (NH)	16	44	24	28	146	0.08%	0.15%	0.07%	0.07%	0.37%
Mixed race or Multiracial (NH)	x	x	317	375	1,043	x	x	0.88%	0.94%	2.63%
Hispanic or Latino (any race)	962	3,493	6,684	9,561	9,857	4.75%	11.79%	18.61%	23.90%	24.86%
Total	20,264	29,627	35,910	39,996	39,644	100.00%	100.00%	100.00%	100.00%	100.00%

=== 2010 census ===
As of the census of 2010, there were 39,996 people, 13,857 households, and 9,016 families residing in the county. The population density was 46 inhabitants per square mile (18/km^{2}). There were 15,504 housing units at an average density of 52 per square mile (8/km^{2}). The racial makeup of the county was 87.9% White, 8.6% Black or African American, 1.3% Native American, 0.9% Asian, 0.1% Pacific Islander, and 1.2% from two or more races. 24.5% of the population were Hispanic or Latino of any race.

=== 2005 estimate ===
In 2005 68.5% of the county population was White non-Hispanic, 21.6% of the population was Latino, 8.0% was African-American and both Native Americans and Asians constituted 0.9% of the population.

=== 2000 census ===
In 2000 there were 12,593 households, out of which 30.40% had children under the age of 18 living with them, 55.50% were married couples living together, 10.70% had a female householder with no husband present, and 28.40% were non-families. 21.50% of all households were made up of individuals, and 10.10% had someone living alone who was 65 years of age or older. The average household size was 2.69 and the average family size was 3.07.

In the county in 2000 the population was spread out, with 25.20% under the age of 18, 9.50% from 18 to 24, 27.10% from 25 to 44, 21.90% from 45 to 64, and 16.30% who were 65 years of age or older. The median age was 37 years. For every 100 females, there were 115.50 males. For every 100 females age 18 and over, there were 115.20 males.

== Education ==
The sole school district in the county is Okeechobee County School District.

Okeechobee County is part of the Heartland Library Cooperative which serves Okeechobee County and some of the surrounding counties, including Glades, Highlands, Hardee, and DeSoto. The seven-branch library system has one branch in the city of Okeechobee and is also affiliated with Indian River State College through its Dixon Hendry campus. The Okeechobee County Public Library opened in 1968.

== Communities ==
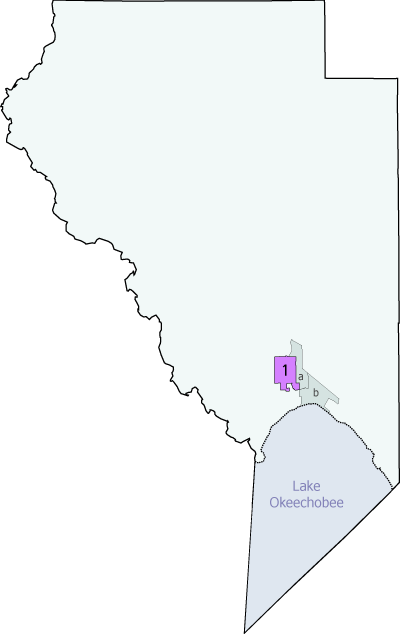

=== City ===
- Okeechobee

=== Census-designated places ===
- Cypress Quarters
- Taylor Creek

=== Other unincorporated communities ===
- Ancient Oaks
- Barber Quarters
- Basinger
- Basswood Estates
- Country Hills Estates
- Deans Court
- Dixie Ranch Acres
- Duberry Gardens
- Echo Estates
- Everglades
- Fort Drum
- Four Seasons
- Hilolo
- Mildred
- Oak Park
- Okeechobee Little Farms
- Quail Acres
- Rookerville
- Sherman
- Taylor Creek Isle
- Treasure Island
- Viking Estates
- Upthegrove Beach
- Whispering Pines

== Politics ==
Prior to the Civil Rights Act, Okeechobee County followed the Solid South pattern of voting Democratic, making an exception in 1928 amidst Southern skepticism to Democrat Al Smith's Northern Catholicism. The only non-Republicans to carry Okeechobee County at the presidential level after John F. Kennedy in 1960 were Independent segregationist George Wallace of Alabama (which borders Florida) in 1968 as well as Southern Democrats Jimmy Carter of Georgia (another neighboring state of Florida; 1976 and 1980) and Bill Clinton of Arkansas (1992 and 1996).

Today, Okeechobee County — in line with other Florida Heartland counties — is a rock-ribbed Republican stronghold, with the last Democratic presidential candidate to win the county being Clinton in 1996, the last to be competitive in the county being Al Gore in 2000 (who lost the county by less than 5%), the last to win at least 40% of the county vote being John Kerry in 2004, and the last to win so much as 30% of the vote being Barack Obama in 2012.

United States presidential election results for Okeechobee County, Florida
Year	Republican		Democratic		Third party(ies)	
Year	No.	%	No.	%	No.	%
1920	58	15.93%	237	65.11%	69	18.96%
1924	57	20.96%	182	66.91%	33	12.13%
1928	657	68.87%	287	30.08%	10	1.05%
1932	90	10.09%	802	89.91%	0	0.00%
1936	186	22.12%	655	77.88%	0	0.00%
1940	122	12.92%	822	87.08%	0	0.00%
1944	119	13.65%	753	86.35%	0	0.00%
1948	179	17.08%	784	74.81%	85	8.11%
1952	539	37.96%	881	62.04%	0	0.00%
1956	575	40.78%	835	59.22%	0	0.00%
1960	631	35.93%	1,125	64.07%	0	0.00%
1964	1,316	56.43%	1,016	43.57%	0	0.00%
1968	862	28.66%	542	18.02%	1,604	53.32%
1972	2,581	80.58%	621	19.39%	1	0.03%
1976	1,598	33.12%	3,184	65.99%	43	0.89%
1980	2,783	44.81%	3,228	51.98%	199	3.20%
1984	4,449	66.65%	2,226	33.35%	0	0.00%
1988	4,736	60.79%	3,007	38.60%	48	0.62%
1992	3,298	35.20%	3,418	36.48%	2,654	28.32%
1996	3,418	34.38%	4,826	48.55%	1,697	17.07%
2000	5,057	51.32%	4,589	46.57%	208	2.11%
2004	6,978	57.24%	5,153	42.27%	59	0.48%
2008	7,561	58.89%	5,108	39.79%	170	1.32%
2012	7,328	59.25%	4,856	39.27%	183	1.48%
2016	9,356	67.99%	3,959	28.77%	446	3.24%
2020	11,470	71.76%	4,390	27.46%	124	0.78%
2024	12,315	76.51%	3,671	22.81%	110	0.68%

=== Voter registration ===
According to the Secretary of State's office, Republicans are a majority of registered voters in Okeechobee County.

Okeechobee County Voter Registration & Party Enrollment as of July 31, 2022
Political Party	Total Voters	Percentage
Republican	11,423	50.68%
Democratic	6,211	27.55%
No party affiliation	4,550	20.19%
Minor parties	355	1.58%
Total	22,539	100.00%

== See also ==
- Florida Heartland
- National Register of Historic Places listings in Okeechobee County, Florida
- Treasure Coast
