= Barber Quarters, Florida =

Unincorporated community in Florida, U.S.

Barber Quarters is an unincorporated community in Okeechobee County, Florida, United States. It is a suburb of Okeechobee, located to its north on U.S Route 441.

== Geography ==
Barber Quarters is located at 27°15′09″N 80°50′21″W.
