= 1944 United States presidential election in Florida =

- November 7, 1944
- Turnout: 32.5%

Nominee	Franklin D. Roosevelt	Thomas Dewey
Party	Democratic	Republican
Home state	New York	New York
Running mate	Harry Truman	John Bricker
Electoral vote	8	0
Popular vote	339,377	143,215
Percentage	70.32%	29.68%
County results
Roosevelt
50–60%
60–70%
70–80%
80–90%
90–100%
President before election
Franklin D. Roosevelt
Democratic
Elected President
Franklin D. Roosevelt
Democratic

The 1944 United States presidential election in Florida was held on November 7, 1944. Voters chose eight electors, or representatives to the Electoral College, who voted for president and vice president.

Incumbent Franklin D. Roosevelt carried Florida by a landslide large margin of 40.64 percentage points, or 196,162 votes, over Republican Thomas Dewey, receiving Florida's eight electoral votes. This constitutes the last time that a Democratic presidential nominee has won more than 52% of the vote in Florida, as well as the last time that a Democrat has swept every county in the state.

This election marked the end of Florida's status as a one-party Democratic "Solid South" state. The subsequent combination of mass migration–especially of retirees–from the historically Republican North, in addition to increasing Democratic liberalism on racial policies, would gradually turn the state into a bellwether starting in 1948. This trend was already evident in some counties in South and Central Florida, however, with Roosevelt narrowly carrying Broward County by just 5% despite winning every county by double digits in his previous 3 presidential runs.

As of 2024, this remains the last time that the following counties have ever supported a Democratic presidential nominee: Indian River, Lake, Lee, Manatee, Martin and Sarasota. Orange County, containing Orlando, would not vote Democratic again until 2000, while Palm Beach County would not vote Democratic again until 1992, and Broward County not until 1976.

== Results ==
1944 United States presidential election in Florida
Party	Candidate	Votes	Percentage	Electoral votes
Democratic	Franklin D. Roosevelt (incumbent)	339,377	70.29%	8
Republican	Thomas E. Dewey	143,215	29.66%	0
Write-ins	Scattered	211 (Note: These write-in votes were not separated by county)	0.04%	0
Totals		482,803	100.00%	8
Voter turnout (Voting age)		32.5%		

=== Results by county ===
County	Franklin Delano Roosevelt Democratic		Thomas Edmund Dewey Republican		Margin		Total votes cast
County	#	%	#	%	#	%	Total votes cast
Alachua	5,755	77.30%	1,690	22.70%	4,065	54.60%	7,445
Baker	1,137	89.95%	127	10.05%	1,010	79.90%	1,264
Bay	6,317	84.87%	1,126	15.13%	5,191	69.74%	7,443
Bradford	1,775	83.33%	355	16.67%	1,420	66.66%	2,130
Brevard	2,651	59.98%	1,769	40.02%	882	19.96%	4,420
Broward	6,183	52.55%	5,583	47.45%	600	5.10%	11,766
Calhoun	1,504	87.90%	207	12.10%	1,297	75.80%	1,711
Charlotte	789	66.14%	404	33.86%	385	32.28%	1,193
Citrus	1,328	83.42%	264	16.58%	1,064	66.84%	1,592
Clay	1,251	70.64%	520	29.36%	731	41.28%	1,771
Collier	640	78.05%	180	21.95%	460	56.10%	820
Columbia	2,467	82.12%	537	17.88%	1,930	64.24%	3,004
Dade	60,100	66.44%	30,357	33.56%	29,743	32.88%	90,457
De Soto	1,722	76.03%	543	23.97%	1,179	52.06%	2,265
Dixie	1,104	92.93%	84	7.07%	1,020	85.86%	1,188
Duval	36,867	75.11%	12,220	24.89%	24,647	50.22%	49,087
Escambia	16,240	83.58%	3,191	16.42%	13,049	67.16%	19,431
Flagler	401	77.86%	114	22.14%	287	55.72%	515
Franklin	1,176	92.02%	102	7.98%	1,074	84.04%	1,278
Gadsden	2,574	84.78%	462	15.22%	2,112	69.56%	3,036
Gilchrist	862	91.41%	81	8.59%	781	82.82%	943
Glades	373	69.46%	164	30.54%	209	38.92%	537
Gulf	1,267	93.85%	83	6.15%	1,184	87.70%	1,350
Hamilton	1,200	82.08%	262	17.92%	938	64.16%	1,462
Hardee	2,156	75.28%	708	24.72%	1,448	50.56%	2,864
Hendry	933	72.89%	347	27.11%	586	45.78%	1,280
Hernando	1,002	74.33%	346	25.67%	656	48.66%	1,348
Highlands	2,113	70.74%	874	29.26%	1,239	41.48%	2,987
Hillsborough	31,146	75.24%	10,252	24.76%	20,894	50.48%	41,398
Holmes	2,652	74.49%	908	25.51%	1,744	48.98%	3,560
Indian River	1,292	62.99%	759	37.01%	533	25.98%	2,051
Jackson	4,633	82.97%	951	17.03%	3,682	65.94%	5,584
Jefferson	1,071	85.07%	188	14.93%	883	70.14%	1,259
Lafayette	825	85.49%	140	14.51%	685	70.98%	965
Lake	4,323	61.62%	2,693	38.38%	1,630	23.24%	7,016
Lee	3,353	64.26%	1,865	35.74%	1,488	28.52%	5,218
Leon	4,505	84.36%	835	15.64%	3,670	68.72%	5,340
Levy	2,107	90.35%	225	9.65%	1,882	80.70%	2,332
Liberty	626	94.28%	38	5.72%	588	88.56%	664
Madison	1,914	86.72%	293	13.28%	1,621	73.44%	2,207
Manatee	4,544	67.20%	2,218	32.80%	2,326	34.40%	6,762
Marion	5,597	77.32%	1,642	22.68%	3,955	54.64%	7,239
Martin	960	64.43%	530	35.57%	430	28.86%	1,490
Monroe	3,882	87.28%	566	12.72%	3,316	74.56%	4,448
Nassau	1,892	78.21%	527	21.79%	1,365	56.42%	2,419
Okaloosa	2,877	82.13%	626	17.87%	2,251	64.26%	3,503
Okeechobee	753	86.35%	119	13.65%	634	72.70%	872
Orange	12,008	57.64%	8,826	42.36%	3,182	15.28%	20,834
Osceola	1,763	55.74%	1,400	44.26%	363	11.48%	3,163
Palm Beach	11,093	59.25%	7,628	40.75%	3,465	18.50%	18,721
Pasco	2,523	65.11%	1,352	34.89%	1,171	30.22%	3,875
Pinellas	19,574	57.72%	14,340	42.28%	5,234	15.44%	33,914
Polk	13,152	71.86%	5,150	28.14%	8,002	43.72%	18,302
Putnam	2,926	71.56%	1,163	28.44%	1,763	43.12%	4,089
St. John's	3,764	70.41%	1,582	29.59%	2,182	40.82%	5,346
St. Lucie	2,129	69.83%	920	30.17%	1,209	39.66%	3,049
Santa Rosa	2,607	75.15%	862	24.85%	1,745	50.30%	3,469
Sarasota	3,443	62.01%	2,109	37.99%	1,334	24.02%	5,552
Seminole	2,940	68.50%	1,352	31.50%	1,588	37.00%	4,292
Sumter	1,838	86.94%	276	13.06%	1,562	73.88%	2,114
Suwannee	2,526	83.95%	483	16.05%	2,043	67.90%	3,009
Taylor	1,828	91.72%	165	8.28%	1,663	83.44%	1,993
Union	905	89.87%	102	10.13%	803	79.74%	1,007
Volusia	8,233	57.20%	6,161	42.80%	2,072	14.40%	14,394
Wakulla	1,018	93.31%	73	6.69%	945	86.62%	1,091
Walton	2,569	78.85%	689	21.15%	1,880	57.70%	3,258
Washington	1,699	77.02%	507	22.98%	1,192	54.04%	2,206
Totals	339,377	70.29%	143,215	29.66%	196,162	40.63%	482,803
