= 1952 United States presidential election in Florida =

- November 4, 1952

Nominee	Dwight D. Eisenhower	Adlai Stevenson
Party	Republican	Democratic
Home state	New York	Illinois
Running mate	Richard Nixon	John Sparkman
Electoral vote	10	0
Popular vote	544,036	444,950
Percentage	54.99%	44.97%

Eisenhower
50–60%
60–70%
70–80%
Stevenson
50–60%
60–70%
70–80%
80–90%
President before election
Harry S. Truman
Democratic
Elected President
Dwight D. Eisenhower
Republican

The 1952 United States presidential election in Florida took place on November 4, 1952, as part of the 1952 United States presidential election. Florida voters chose ten representatives, or electors, to the Electoral College, who voted for president and vice president.

Florida was won by Columbia University President Dwight D. Eisenhower (R–Kansas), running with Senator Richard Nixon, with 54.99% of the popular vote, against Adlai Stevenson (D–Illinois), running with Senator John Sparkman, with 44.97% of the popular vote.

In contrast to Herbert Hoover's anti-Catholicism-driven victory in the state in 1928, Eisenhower's victory was entirely concentrated in the newer and more liberal South Florida counties, which had seen extensive Northern settlement since the war, did not have a history of slave-based plantation farming, and saw Eisenhower as more favourable to business than the Democratic Party. Eisenhower swept the urban areas of Miami, Orlando, Fort Lauderdale, Sarasota and Tampa, but failed to gain much support in the northwestern pineywoods that had been the core of the 1928 "Hoovercrat" bolt. In this region – inhabited by socially exceptionally conservative poor whites who had been voting in increasing numbers since Florida abolished its poll tax – Democratic loyalties dating from the Civil War remained extremely strong and economic populism hostile in general toward urban areas kept voters loyal to Stevenson. Whereas the urban voters who turned to Eisenhower felt wholly disfranchised both locally and nationally by the one-party system and malapportionment, rural poor voters supported the New Deal/Fair Deal status quo.

In contrast to the wholly Deep South states of Mississippi, Louisiana and South Carolina, where former Thurmond voters turned to Eisenhower, Florida – although akin to those states in entirely lacking traditional Appalachian, Ozark or German "Forty-Eighter" Republicanism – did not see its 1948 Dixiecrat voters or black belt whites turn over to Eisenhower on a large scale, and they were less loyal than in North Carolina, Texas and Virginia, where traditional Republicanism did exist. Florida's Southern Democrat political culture was strong enough that they were the only state that the Southern candidate Richard Russell won in the 1952 Democratic primaries.

Overall the politics of Florida in the 1952 presidential election were distant and did not interact.

Eisenhower's victory was the first of three consecutive Republican victories in the state, as Florida would not vote Democratic again until Lyndon B. Johnson’s landslide victory in 1964. As of the 2024 presidential election, this is the last election in which Collier County voted for a Democratic presidential candidate.

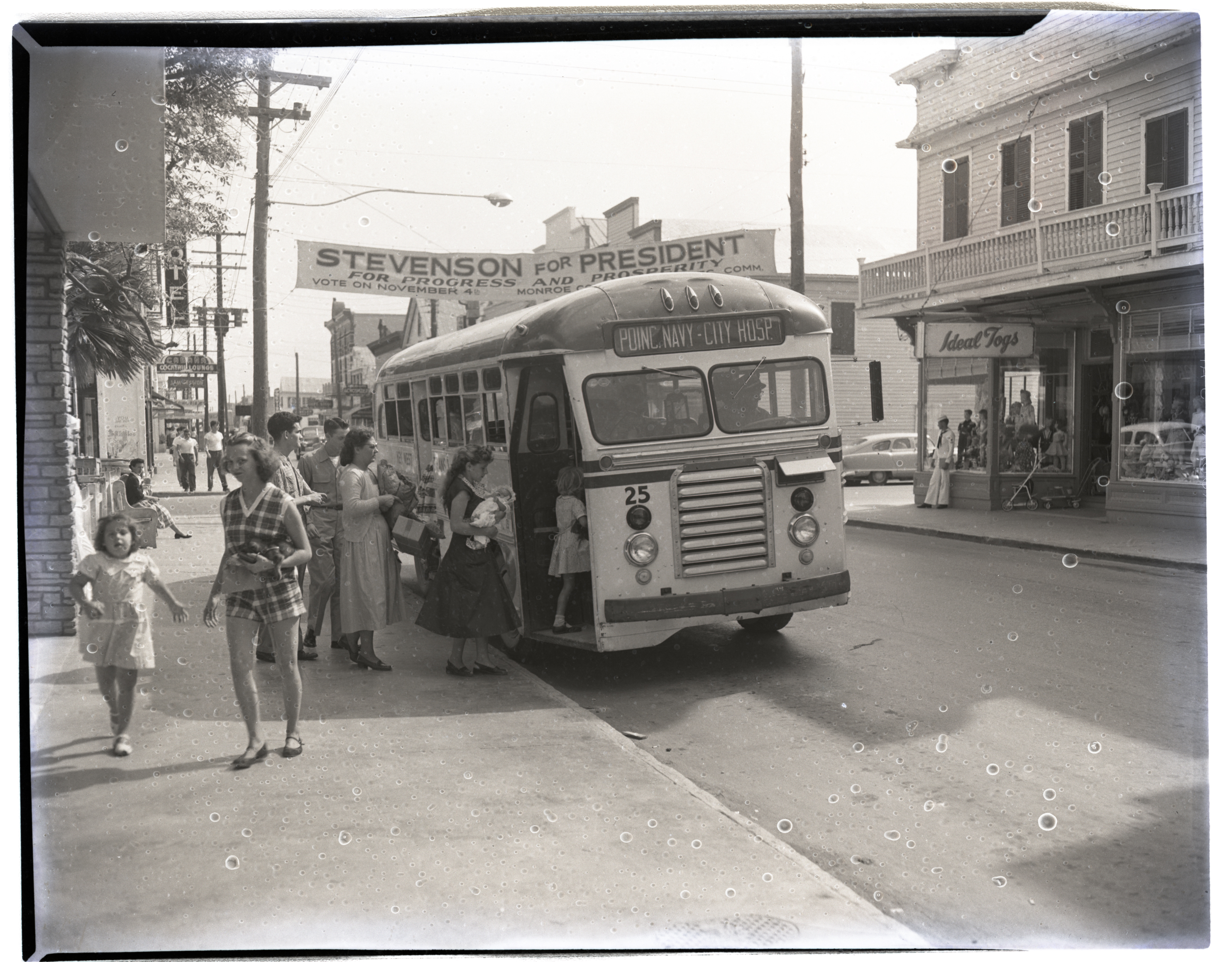
A campaign banner overhanging a street in Key West in support of Adlai Stevenson.

== Results ==
Electoral results
Presidential candidate	Party	Home state	Popular vote		Electoral vote	Running mate		
Presidential candidate	Party	Home state	Count	Percentage	Electoral vote	Vice-presidential candidate	Home state	Electoral vote
Dwight D. Eisenhower	Republican	New York	544,036	54.99%	10	Richard Nixon	California	10
Adlai Stevenson II	Democratic	Illinois	444,950	44.97%	0	John Sparkman	Alabama	0
Various candidates (Note: These votes were listed in America at the Polls state-wide, but not in Dave Leip's Atlas.)	Write-ins	—	351 (Note: These write-in votes were given only as a state-wide total, not separated by county.)	0.04%	0	—	—	0
Total			989,337	100%	10			10
Needed to win					270			270

=== Results by county ===
County	Dwight D. Eisenhower Republican		Adlai Stevenson Democratic		Margin		Total votes cast
County	#	%	#	%	#	%	Total votes cast
Alachua	8,432	58.47%	5,990	41.53%	2,442	16.94%	14,422
Baker	419	22.04%	1,482	77.96%	-1,063	-55.92%	1,901
Bay	4,812	35.38%	8,789	64.62%	-3,977	-29.24%	13,601
Bradford	976	29.68%	2,312	70.32%	-1,336	-40.64%	3,288
Brevard	6,756	61.91%	4,157	38.09%	2,599	23.82%	10,913
Broward	26,506	69.10%	11,854	30.90%	14,652	38.20%	38,360
Calhoun	590	24.41%	1,827	75.59%	-1,237	-51.18%	2,417
Charlotte	1,134	58.79%	795	41.21%	339	17.58%	1,929
Citrus	1,249	47.85%	1,361	52.15%	-112	-4.30%	2,610
Clay	2,116	49.07%	2,196	50.93%	-80	-1.86%	4,312
Collier	1,086	49.59%	1,104	50.41%	-18	-0.82%	2,190
Columbia	2,041	38.73%	3,229	61.27%	-1,188	-22.54%	5,270
DeSoto	1,256	41.21%	1,792	58.79%	-536	-17.58%	3,048
Dixie	440	34.81%	824	65.19%	-384	-30.38%	1,264
Duval	50,346	48.27%	53,949	51.73%	-3,603	-3.46%	104,295
Escambia	12,176	37.27%	20,495	62.73%	-8,319	-25.46%	32,671
Flagler	512	51.30%	486	48.70%	26	2.60%	998
Franklin	611	33.04%	1,238	66.96%	-627	-33.92%	1,849
Gadsden	1,835	40.41%	2,706	59.59%	-871	-19.18%	4,541
Gilchrist	195	16.43%	992	83.57%	-797	-67.14%	1,187
Glades	264	39.70%	401	60.30%	-137	-20.60%	665
Gulf	490	21.69%	1,769	78.31%	-1,279	-56.62%	2,259
Hamilton	658	31.18%	1,452	68.82%	-794	-37.64%	2,110
Hardee	1,802	46.55%	2,069	53.45%	-267	-6.90%	3,871
Hendry	918	46.60%	1,052	53.40%	-134	-6.80%	1,970
Hernando	1,279	53.67%	1,104	46.33%	175	7.34%	2,383
Highlands	2,952	51.90%	2,736	48.10%	216	3.80%	5,688
Hillsborough	36,316	52.20%	33,252	47.80%	3,064	4.40%	69,568
Holmes	1,230	27.67%	3,216	72.33%	-1,986	-44.66%	4,446
Indian River	3,055	65.94%	1,578	34.06%	1,477	31.88%	4,633
Jackson	2,398	29.53%	5,722	70.47%	-3,324	-40.94%	8,120
Jefferson	665	36.22%	1,171	63.78%	-506	-27.56%	1,836
Lafayette	269	21.52%	981	78.48%	-712	-56.96%	1,250
Lake	9,132	70.63%	3,797	29.37%	5,335	41.26%	12,929
Lee	5,528	59.09%	3,828	40.91%	1,700	18.18%	9,356
Leon	5,604	41.19%	8,000	58.81%	-2,396	-17.62%	13,604
Levy	1,066	34.66%	2,010	65.34%	-944	-30.68%	3,076
Liberty	237	18.60%	1,037	81.40%	-800	-62.80%	1,274
Madison	1,209	42.66%	1,625	57.34%	-416	-14.68%	2,834
Manatee	9,055	66.40%	4,583	33.60%	4,472	32.80%	13,638
Marion	6,134	51.17%	5,854	48.83%	280	2.34%	11,988
Martin	2,308	64.65%	1,262	35.35%	1,046	29.30%	3,570
Miami-Dade	122,174	56.77%	93,022	43.23%	29,152	13.54%	215,196
Monroe	2,943	37.33%	4,941	62.67%	-1,998	-25.34%	7,884
Nassau	1,731	40.82%	2,510	59.18%	-779	-18.36%	4,241
Okaloosa	2,355	30.47%	5,375	69.53%	-3,020	-39.06%	7,730
Okeechobee	539	37.96%	881	62.04%	-342	-24.08%	1,420
Orange	29,813	71.06%	12,141	28.94%	17,672	42.12%	41,954
Osceola	3,133	62.25%	1,900	37.75%	1,233	24.50%	5,033
Palm Beach	28,595	67.57%	13,723	32.43%	14,872	35.14%	42,318
Pasco	4,562	56.24%	3,549	43.76%	1,013	12.48%	8,111
Pinellas	55,691	71.35%	22,365	28.65%	33,326	42.70%	78,056
Polk	20,874	51.63%	19,556	48.37%	1,318	3.26%	40,430
Putnam	3,766	51.65%	3,525	48.35%	241	3.30%	7,291
St. Johns	4,702	51.85%	4,366	48.15%	336	3.70%	9,068
St. Lucie	4,667	62.65%	2,782	37.35%	1,885	25.30%	7,449
Santa Rosa	1,744	28.50%	4,375	71.50%	-2,631	-43.00%	6,119
Sarasota	9,538	70.74%	3,945	29.26%	5,593	41.48%	13,483
Seminole	4,683	60.02%	3,120	39.98%	1,563	20.04%	7,803
Sumter	1,054	31.64%	2,277	68.36%	-1,223	-36.72%	3,331
Suwannee	1,611	36.30%	2,827	63.70%	-1,216	-27.40%	4,438
Taylor	744	29.40%	1,787	70.60%	-1,043	-41.20%	2,531
Union	268	21.68%	968	78.32%	-700	-56.64%	1,236
Volusia	19,815	62.46%	11,910	37.54%	7,905	24.92%	31,725
Wakulla	375	24.24%	1,172	75.76%	-797	-51.52%	1,547
Walton	1,502	29.48%	3,593	70.52%	-2,091	-41.04%	5,095
Washington	1,100	32.71%	2,263	67.29%	-1,163	-34.58%	3,363
Totals	544,036	54.99%	444,950	44.97%	99,086	10.02%	989,337

==== Counties that flipped from Democratic to Republican ====
- Brevard
- Hernando
- Highlands
- Hillsborough
- Marion
- Miami-Dade
- Osceola
- Pasco
- Polk
- Putnam
- St. Lucie
- Volusia
- Seminole

==== Counties that flipped from Dixiecrat to Republican ====
- Alachua
- Flagler
- St. Johns

=== Results by congressional district ===
Eisenhower won 6 of the 8 congressional districts, all of which were held by Democrats.

District	Eisenhower	Stevenson
1st	61.9%	38.1%
2nd	48.3%	51.7%
3rd	26.7%	73.3%
4th	56.1%	43.9%
5th	63%	37%
6th	65.5%	34.5%
7th	56.7%	43.3%
8th	57.7%	42.3%

== See also ==
- United States presidential elections in Florida
