= Whispering Pines, Florida =

Unincorporated community in Florida, U.S.

Whispering Pines is an unincorporated community in Okeechobee County, Florida, United States. It is a suburb of Okeechobee, located to its north on US 441.

== Geography ==
Whispering Pines is located at 27°16′39″N 80°50′22″W.
