= 1968 United States presidential election in Florida =

- November 5, 1968
- Turnout: ▲79%

Nominee	Richard Nixon	Hubert Humphrey	George Wallace
Party	Republican	Democratic	George Wallace Party
Alliance			American Independent
Home state	New York (Note: Although he was born in California and he served as a U.S. senator from California, in 1968 Richard Nixon's official state of residence was New York, because he moved there to practice law after his defeat in the 1962 California gubernatorial election. During his first term as president, Nixon re-established his residency in California. Consequently, most reliable reference books list Nixon's home state as New York in the 1968 election and his home state as California in the 1972 (and 1960) election.)	Minnesota	Alabama
Running mate	Spiro Agnew	Edmund Muskie	Curtis LeMay
Electoral vote	14	0	0
Popular vote	886,804	676,794	624,207
Percentage	40.53%	30.93%	28.53%

Nixon
30–40%
40–50%
50–60%
60–70%
Humphrey
30–40%
40–50%
50–60%
Wallace
30–40%
40–50%
50–60%
60–70%
70–80%
80–90%
President before election
Lyndon B. Johnson
Democratic
Elected President
Richard Nixon
Republican

The 1968 United States presidential election in Florida was held on November 5, 1968. Florida voters chose fourteen electors, or representatives to the Electoral College, who voted for president and vice president.

Nixon obtained his support in Central Florida, Democratic candidate Hubert Humphrey got his support from Southern Florida, and third-party candidate George Wallace got his support from the Florida Panhandle, or Northern Florida. This was one of the better states for George Wallace, due to the Northern part of the state being against the Civil Rights Act of 1964, which Lyndon Johnson had signed into law. This led to Democratic party gains in support from black voters. The party simultaneously lost the great majority of white voters. One exception to this abandonment by white voters came in the Jewish sections of Miami.

Among white voters, 45% supported Nixon, 32% supported Wallace, and 23% supported Humphrey. The Republican Party held their convention in Miami Beach that year.

== Primary elections ==
Democratic Primary results by county Smathers: 30–40%; 40–50%; 50–60%; 60–70%; McCarthy: 40–50%; No Preference: 30–40%; 40–50%

=== Democratic primary ===
Florida held its Democratic presidential primary on May 28, 1968. George Smathers won the Florida Democratic primary. Scott Kelly lead the unpledged delegation.

Candidate	Number of votes	%
George Smathers	236,242	46.11%
Eugene McCarthy	147,216	28.73%
(no preference)	128,899	25.16%
Total	512,357	100%

=== Republican primary ===
Florida held its Republican primary on May 28, 1968. The only option on the ballot was "no preference".

Candidate	Number of votes	%
No preference	51,509	100%
Total	51,509	100%

== Results ==
Electoral results
Presidential candidate	Party	Home state	Popular vote		Electoral vote	Running mate		
Presidential candidate	Party	Home state	Count	Percentage	Electoral vote	Vice-presidential candidate	Home state	Electoral vote
Richard Nixon	Republican	New York	886,804	40.53%	14	Spiro Agnew	Maryland	14
Hubert Humphrey	Democratic	Minnesota	676,794	30.93%	0	Edmund Muskie	Maine	0
George Wallace	American Independent	Alabama	624,207	28.53%	0	Curtis LeMay	California	0
Total			2,187,805	100%	14			14
Needed to win					270			270

=== Results by county ===
County	Richard Nixon Republican		Hubert Humphrey Democratic		George Wallace American Independent		Margin		Total votes cast
County	#	%	#	%	#	%	#	%	Total votes cast
Alachua	9,670	34.02%	10,060	35.39%	8,696	30.59%	-390	-1.37%	28,426
Baker	294	10.72%	487	17.75%	1,962	71.53%	-1,475 (Note: In this county where Nixon ran third behind Wallace, margin given is Humphrey vote minus Wallace vote and percentage margin Humphrey percentage minus Wallace percentage.)	-53.78%	2,743
Bay	5,121	21.07%	4,020	16.54%	15,161	62.39%	-10,040 (Note: In this county where Humphrey ran third behind Wallace, margin given is Nixon vote minus Wallace vote and percentage margin Nixon percentage minus Wallace percentage.)	-41.32%	24,302
Bradford	718	15.18%	1,173	24.79%	2,840	60.03%	-1,667	-35.24%	4,731
Brevard	37,124	48.02%	18,281	23.65%	21,909	28.34%	15,215	19.68%	77,314
Broward	106,122	54.50%	56,613	29.07%	31,992	16.43%	49,509	25.43%	194,727
Calhoun	356	11.38%	398	12.72%	2,375	75.90%	-1,977	-63.18%	3,129
Charlotte	6,056	50.58%	3,647	30.46%	2,270	18.96%	2,409	20.12%	11,973
Citrus	2,767	38.71%	1,775	24.83%	2,606	36.46%	161	2.25%	7,148
Clay	3,251	35.14%	1,954	21.12%	4,046	43.74%	-795	-8.60%	9,251
Collier	5,362	50.85%	2,230	21.15%	2,952	28.00%	2,410	22.85%	10,544
Columbia	1,553	21.13%	1,750	23.81%	4,046	55.06%	-2,296	-31.25%	7,349
Dade	135,222	37.02%	176,689	48.37%	53,391	14.62%	-41,467	-11.35%	365,302
DeSoto	1,103	26.94%	937	22.89%	2,054	50.17%	-951	-23.23%	4,094
Dixie	217	10.39%	325	15.57%	1,546	74.04%	-1,221	-58.47%	2,088
Duval	51,585	30.89%	54,834	32.84%	60,559	36.27%	-5,725	-3.43%	166,978
Escambia	15,089	22.07%	16,281	23.81%	37,000	54.12%	-20,719	-30.31%	68,370
Flagler	360	20.25%	601	33.80%	817	45.95%	-216	-12.15%	1,778
Franklin	529	16.86%	699	22.28%	1,909	60.85%	-1,210	-38.57%	3,137
Gadsden	1,337	14.76%	3,274	36.15%	4,446	49.09%	-1,172	-12.94%	9,057
Gilchrist	183	12.12%	208	13.77%	1,119	74.11%	-911	-60.34%	1,510
Glades	261	23.92%	230	21.08%	600	55.00%	-339	-31.08%	1,091
Gulf	364	9.58%	711	18.71%	2,725	71.71%	-2,014	-53.00%	3,800
Hamilton	337	12.34%	820	30.03%	1,574	57.63%	-754	-27.60%	2,731
Hardee	1,278	28.34%	703	15.59%	2,529	56.08%	-1,251	-27.74%	4,510
Hendry	900	27.04%	791	23.76%	1,638	49.20%	-738	-22.16%	3,329
Hernando	2,053	34.42%	1,524	25.55%	2,387	40.02%	-334	-5.60%	5,964
Highlands	4,560	42.95%	2,582	24.32%	3,475	32.73%	1,085	10.22%	10,617
Hillsborough	49,441	34.77%	45,848	32.24%	46,913	32.99%	2,528	1.78%	142,202
Holmes	377	7.00%	312	5.79%	4,700	87.21%	-4,323	-80.21%	5,389
Indian River	6,518	51.25%	3,179	24.99%	3,022	23.76%	3,339	26.26%	12,719
Jackson	1,236	10.02%	2,472	20.05%	8,622	69.93%	-6,150	-49.88%	12,330
Jefferson	459	14.84%	1,066	34.48%	1,567	50.68%	-501	-16.20%	3,092
Lafayette	137	9.28%	215	14.56%	1,125	76.17%	-910	-61.61%	1,477
Lake	11,763	47.42%	4,599	18.54%	8,442	34.03%	3,321	13.39%	24,804
Lee	14,376	46.23%	7,978	25.66%	8,741	28.11%	5,635	18.12%	31,095
Leon	9,288	28.49%	10,440	32.02%	12,878	39.50%	-2,438	-7.48%	32,606
Levy	745	18.81%	767	19.36%	2,449	61.83%	-1,682	-42.47%	3,961
Liberty	154	8.96%	242	14.09%	1,322	76.95%	-1,080	-62.86%	1,718
Madison	654	13.81%	1,378	29.10%	2,703	57.09%	-1,325	-27.99%	4,735
Manatee	18,247	52.51%	8,286	23.85%	8,214	23.64%	9,961	28.66%	34,747
Marion	7,468	32.66%	5,798	25.36%	9,600	41.98%	-2,132	-9.32%	22,866
Martin	5,179	50.63%	2,580	25.22%	2,471	24.15%	2,599	25.41%	10,230
Monroe	5,094	34.19%	5,534	37.14%	4,271	28.67%	-440	-2.95%	14,899
Nassau	1,301	19.91%	1,598	24.46%	3,634	55.63%	-2,036	-31.17%	6,533
Okaloosa	5,525	26.54%	3,059	14.69%	12,237	58.77%	-6,712	-32.23%	20,821
Okeechobee	862	28.66%	542	18.02%	1,604	53.32%	-742	-24.66%	3,008
Orange	50,874	50.54%	22,548	22.40%	27,247	27.07%	23,627	23.47%	100,669
Osceola	4,172	43.90%	1,870	19.68%	3,462	36.43%	710	7.47%	9,504
Palm Beach	62,191	53.19%	32,837	28.08%	21,894	18.73%	29,354	25.11%	116,922
Pasco	9,743	42.36%	6,292	27.36%	6,966	30.29%	2,777	12.07%	23,001
Pinellas	109,235	51.71%	68,209	32.29%	33,814	16.01%	41,026	19.42%	211,258
Polk	27,839	36.98%	15,898	21.12%	31,540	41.90%	-3,701	-4.92%	75,277
Putnam	2,955	26.80%	2,920	26.49%	5,150	46.71%	-2,195	-19.91%	11,025
St. Johns	3,880	34.31%	2,748	24.30%	4,682	41.40%	-802	-7.09%	11,310
St. Lucie	7,281	43.02%	5,232	30.92%	4,410	26.06%	2,049	12.10%	16,923
Santa Rosa	2,567	20.19%	1,600	12.58%	8,549	67.23%	-5,982	-47.04%	12,716
Sarasota	30,160	63.73%	10,127	21.40%	7,041	14.88%	20,033	42.33%	47,328
Seminole	10,821	44.69%	6,120	25.27%	7,275	30.04%	3,546	14.65%	24,216
Sumter	910	17.96%	1,277	25.21%	2,879	56.83%	-1,602	-31.62%	5,066
Suwannee	845	14.13%	1,182	19.76%	3,955	66.12%	-2,773	-46.36%	5,982
Taylor	794	15.71%	941	18.62%	3,318	65.66%	-2,377	-47.04%	5,053
Union	179	10.78%	290	17.46%	1,192	71.76%	-902	-54.30%	1,661
Volusia	28,024	39.91%	24,987	35.58%	17,209	24.51%	3,037	4.33%	70,220
Wakulla	247	10.49%	440	18.68%	1,668	70.83%	-1,228	-52.15%	2,355
Walton	963	13.45%	1,064	14.86%	5,135	71.70%	-4,071	-56.84%	7,162
Washington	528	10.71%	722	14.64%	3,682	74.66%	-2,960	-60.02%	4,932
Totals	886,804	40.53%	676,794	30.93%	624,207	28.53%	210,010	9.60%	2,187,805

==== Counties that flipped from Democratic to American Independent ====
- Baker
- Bradford
- Dixie
- Flagler
- Gilchrist
- Hamilton
- Levy
- Sumter
- Union

==== Counties that flipped from Republican to American Independent ====
- Bay
- Calhoun
- Clay
- Columbia
- DeSoto
- Duval
- Escambia
- Franklin
- Glades
- Gadsden
- Gulf
- Hendry
- Hernando
- Hardee
- Holmes
- Jackson
- Jefferson
- Lafayette
- Leon
- Liberty
- Madison
- Marion
- Nassau
- Okaloosa
- Okeechobee
- Putnam
- Polk
- St. Johns
- Santa Rosa
- Suwannee
- Taylor
- Walton
- Washington
- Wakulla

==== Counties that flipped from Democratic to Republican ====
- Brevard
- Charlotte
- Citrus
- Hillsborough
- Pasco
- Pinellas
- St. Lucie
- Volusia

=== Results by congressional district ===
Nixon won 8 congressional districts (including five held by Democrats), while Wallace won 3 (all held by Democrats), and Humphrey won a single district.

District	Nixon	Humphrey	Wallace
1st	19.9%	18.9%	61.2%
2nd	23.5%	27.6%	48.9%
3rd	28.2%	34.6%	37.2%
4th	39.7%	27.7%	32.6%
5th	49.5%	23.1%	27.5%
6th	34.7%	31.3%	34%
7th	47.9%	23.1%	29%
8th	50.8%	31.8%	17.4%
9th	53.0%	26.2%	20.8%
10th	45.9%	36.7%	17.4%
11th	28.5%	58.4%	13.1%
12th	44.8%	38.6%	16.6%

== Analysis ==
Between the imposition of a poll tax in 1889 and the migration of numerous northerners seeking a hotter climate in the 1940s, Florida had been a one-party Democratic state, lacking any traditional white Republicanism due to the absence of mountains or German "Forty-Eighter" settlements. So late as the landmark court case of Smith v. Allwright (1944), half of Florida's registered Republicans were still black, although very few blacks in Florida had ever voted within the previous fifty-five years. New migrants from traditionally Republican northern states took up residence in Central Florida and brought with them their Republican voting habits at the presidential level.

In 1964 there was a complete reversal of the 1950s voting pattern of a largely Republican south and central Florida and continuing Democratic loyalty in the North, with almost zero correlation between 1960 and 1964 county returns. Following his landslide sweep of the northern states, Lyndon Johnson's Great Society at first appeared to be helping him in Florida; however, the relationship soured quickly as the Democratic Party factionalized. In 1966, via a campaign portraying his opponent as a dangerous liberal, Claude R. Kirk defeated Miami mayor Robert King Hugh to become (alongside Winthrop Rockefeller) the first GOP governor of any Confederate state since Alfred A. Taylor in 1922.

As of the 2016 presidential election, this is the last election in which Escambia County, Clay County, Okaloosa County, and Santa Rosa County did not support the Republican candidate.

== Works cited ==
- Black, Earl; Black, Merle (1992). The Vital South: How Presidents Are Elected. Harvard University Press. ISBN 0674941306.
