= Okeechobee County Courthouse =

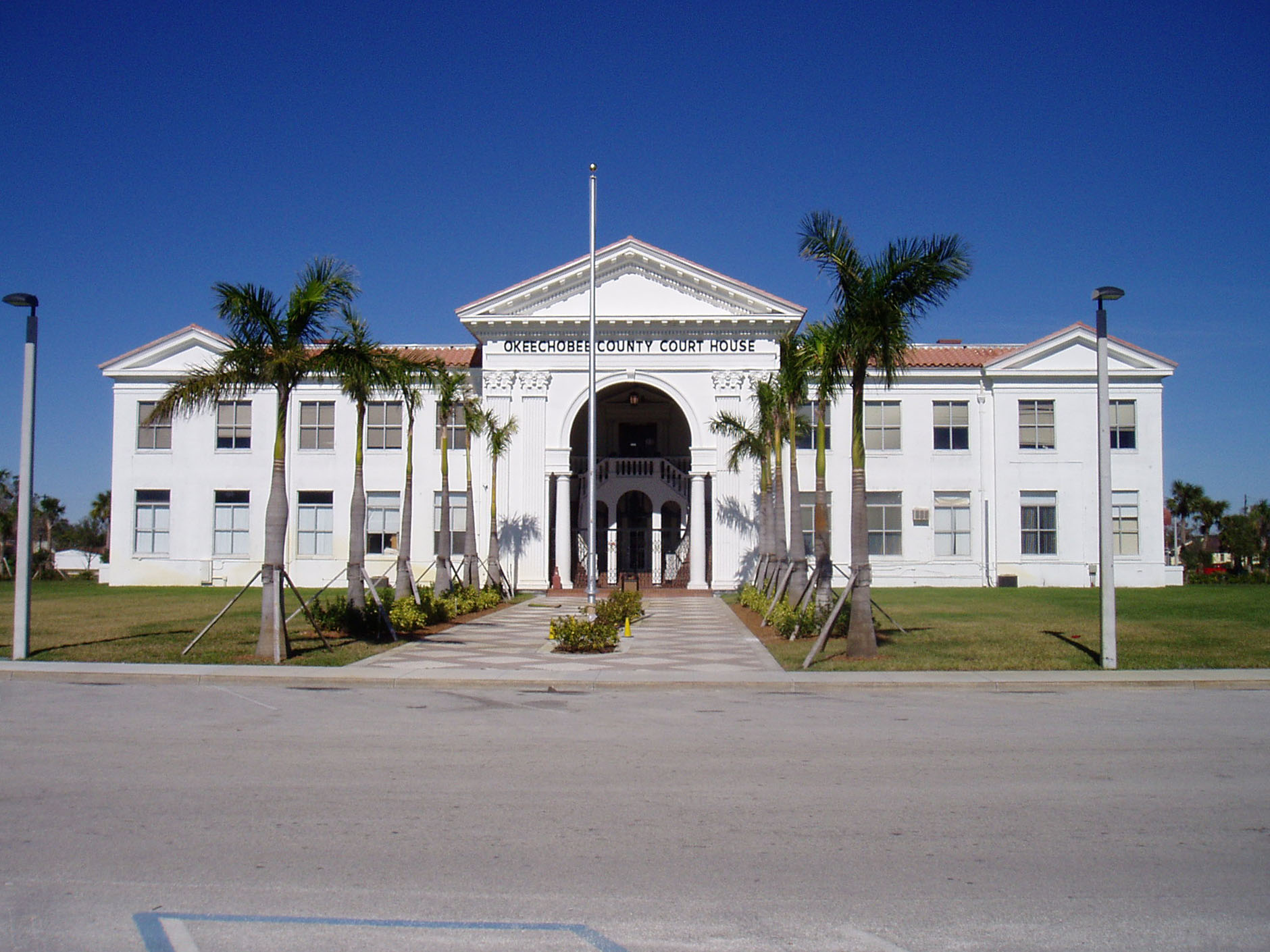
- Okeechobee County Courthouse, 2006, before renovations.
- Interactive map of the Okeechobee County Courthouse area

General information
- Architectural style: Southern Colonial Revival, Mediterranean Revival
- Location: 304 NW 2nd St., Okeechobee, Florida, United States
- Coordinates: 27.244793°N 80.832276°W
- Construction started: 1925
- Completed: 1926, accepted and opened 1927
- Cost: $200,000
- Client: Okeechobee County

Design and construction
- Architect: George Gaynor Hyde
- Engineer: Builder: Rogers and Duncanson

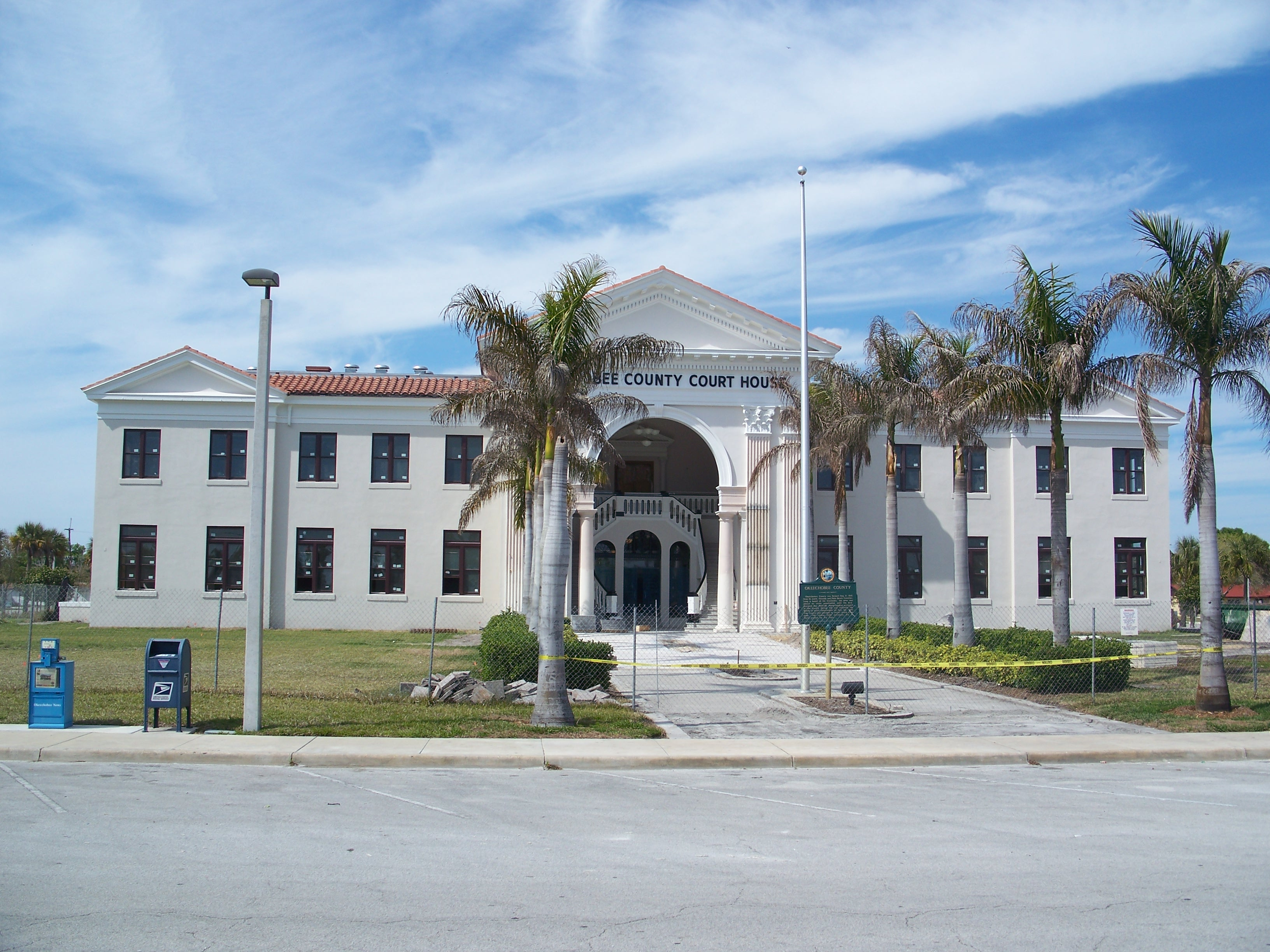
Okeechobee County Courthouse, 2010, during renovations.

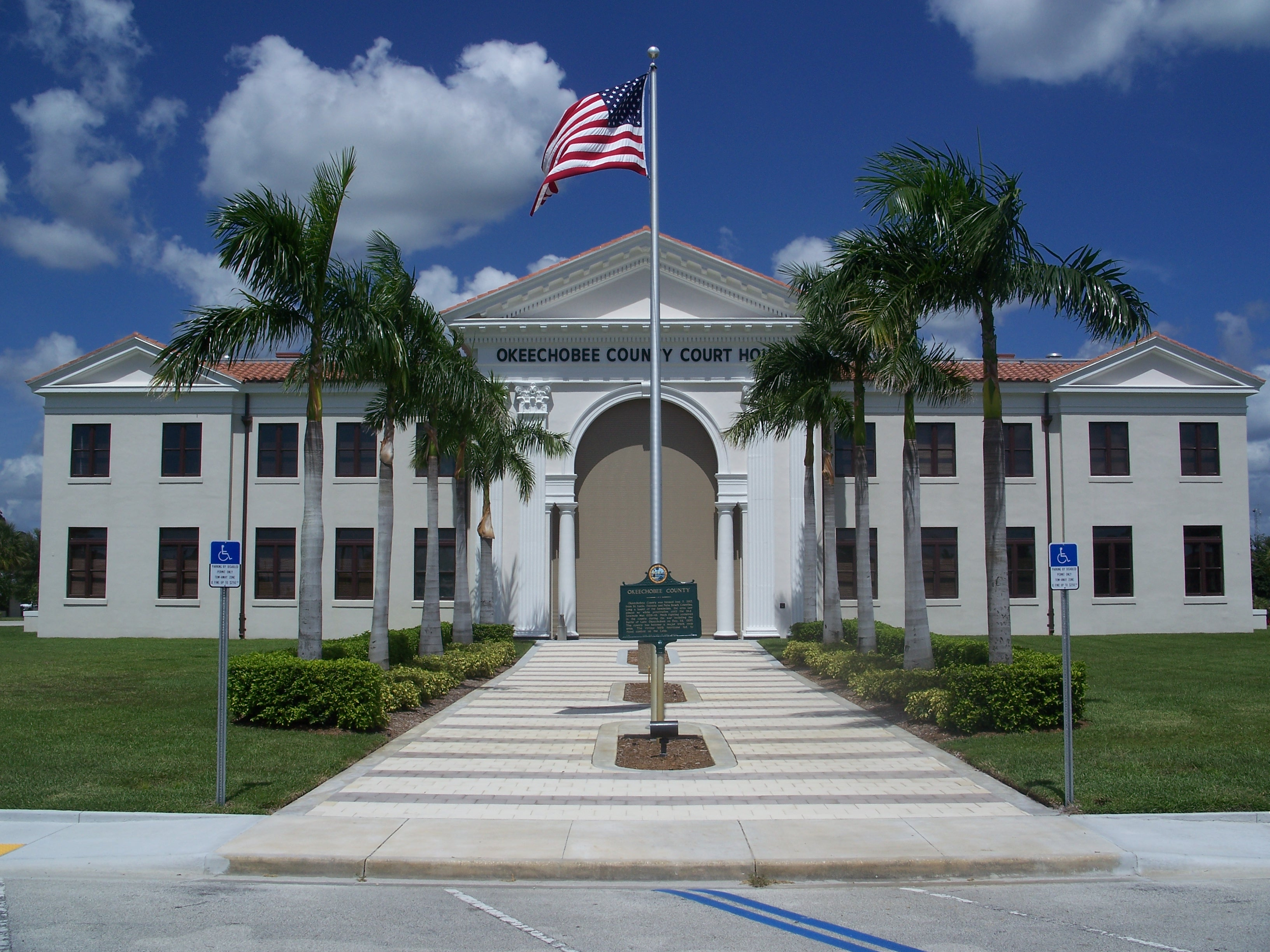
Okeechobee County Courthouse, 2010, after completion of renovations. Note: Photograph features the newly installed security door which is lowered at the close of business.

The Okeechobee County Courthouse, built in 1926, is an historic courthouse building located at 304 Northwest Second Street in Okeechobee, Florida. It was designed by architect George Gaynor Hyde of Miami in what has been variously called the Southern Colonial Revival or Mediterranean Revival style of architecture. Due to the collapse of the Florida Land Boom during its construction, its central dome was never built. After the 1928 Okeechobee hurricane, its hallways were used as a temporary morgue. An open breezeway was planned and built through the center front of the first floor but was later enclosed; the winding stairways to the second floor courtroom still remain.

In 1989, the Okeechobee County Courthouse was listed in A Guide to Florida's Historic Architecture, published by the University of Florida Press.
