= 1996 United States presidential election in Florida =

- November 5, 1996
- Turnout: 67.4% (▼15.6 pp)

Nominee	Bill Clinton	Bob Dole	Ross Perot
Party	Democratic	Republican	Reform
Home state	Arkansas	Kansas	Texas
Running mate	Al Gore	Jack Kemp	Pat Choate
Electoral vote	25	0	0
Popular vote	2,546,870	2,244,536	483,870
Percentage	48.02%	42.32%	9.12%

Clinton
30–40%
40–50%
50–60%
60–70%
70–80%
80–90%
90–100%
Dole
30–40%
40–50%
50–60%
60–70%
70–80%
80–90%
90–100%
Perot
50–60%
70–80%
90–100%
Tie/No Votes
President before election
Bill Clinton
Democratic
Elected President
Bill Clinton
Democratic

The 1996 United States presidential election in Florida took place on November 5, 1996, as part of the 1996 United States presidential election. Voters chose twenty-five representatives, or electors to the Electoral College, who voted for president and vice president. Florida was won by President Bill Clinton (D) over Senator Bob Dole (R-KS), with Clinton winning 48.02% to 42.32% by a margin of 5.7%. Billionaire businessman Ross Perot (Reform-TX) finished in third, with 9.12% of the popular vote. Clinton is also the only US president to win the White House without Florida and then carry it upon winning re-election.

Among white voters, 46% supported Dole, 43% supported Clinton, and 10% supported Perot. As of the 2024 presidential election, this is the last election in which Calhoun, Dixie, Gilchrist, Franklin, Glades, Gulf, Hamilton, Hendry, Levy, Madison, Okeechobee, Putnam, Sumter, Taylor, Wakulla, and Citrus counties voted for a Democratic presidential candidate and the last election in which Orange County voted for a Republican presidential candidate.

== Primaries ==
The Republican Party held its presidential primary election on March 12, 1996, with Bob Dole winning the primary.

1996 Florida Republican presidential primary results
Candidate	#	%
Bob Dole	511,377	56.9%
Steve Forbes	181,768	20.2%
Pat Buchanan	162,770	18.1%
Alan Keyes	16,631	1.9%
Lamar Alexander	14,142	1.6%
Bob Dornan	4,465	0.5%
Richard Lugar	2,236	0.4%
Phil Gramm	2,994	0.3%
Morry Taylor	1,133	0.1%
Total	897,516	100%

== Campaign ==
The first and only vice presidential debate of the 1996 election was held in Florida in St. Petersburg's Bayfront Center Mahaffey Theater with Vice President Al Gore and Jack Kemp participating.

== Results ==
Perot performance by county <5% 5–10% 10–15% 15–20%

United States presidential election in Florida, 1996
Party	Candidate	Running mate	Votes	Percentage	Electoral votes
Democratic	Bill Clinton (incumbent)	Al Gore (incumbent)	2,546,870	48.02%	25
Republican	Bob Dole	Jack Kemp	2,244,536	42.32%	0
Reform	Ross Perot	Patrick Choate	483,870	9.12%	0
Libertarian	Harry Browne	Jo Jorgensen	23,965	0.45%	0
Write-in	Ralph Nader	Islara Souto	4,101	0.08%	0
Write-in	John Hagelin	Dr. V. Tompkins	418	0.01%	0
Write-in	Mary Cal Hollis	Eric Chester	21	0.00%	0
Write-in	James Harris	Laura Garza	13	0.00%	0

=== Results by county ===
County	Bill Clinton Democratic		Bob Dole Republican		Ross Perot Reform		Various candidates Other parties		Margin		Total votes cast
County	#	%	#	%	#	%	#	%	#	%	Total votes cast
Alachua	40,161	53.90%	25,316	33.97%	8,073	10.83%	966	1.30%	14,845	19.93%	74,516
Baker	2,273	34.25%	3,686	55.54%	667	10.05%	11	0.17%	-1,413	-21.29%	6,637
Bay	17,068	33.02%	28,365	54.87%	5,926	11.46%	335	0.65%	-11,297	-21.85%	51,694
Bradford	3,356	40.69%	4,039	48.97%	819	9.93%	34	0.41%	-683	-8.28%	8,248
Brevard	80,445	41.23%	88,022	45.11%	25,256	12.94%	1,410	0.72%	-7,577	-3.88%	195,133
Broward	320,779	63.51%	142,870	28.29%	38,967	7.71%	2,482	0.49%	177,909	35.22%	505,098
Calhoun	1,794	43.15%	1,717	41.29%	630	15.15%	17	0.41%	77	1.86%	4,158
Charlotte	27,121	43.03%	27,847	44.18%	7,783	12.35%	276	0.44%	-726	-1.15%	63,027
Citrus	22,044	44.44%	20,125	40.57%	7,246	14.61%	185	0.37%	1,919	3.87%	49,600
Clay	13,259	28.16%	30,370	64.49%	3,282	6.97%	181	0.38%	-17,111	-36.33%	47,092
Collier	23,185	31.97%	42,593	58.74%	6,320	8.72%	419	0.58%	-19,408	-26.77%	72,517
Columbia	6,691	40.98%	7,588	46.48%	1,970	12.07%	77	0.47%	-897	-5.50%	16,326
DeSoto	3,222	43.01%	3,275	43.71%	966	12.89%	29	0.39%	-53	-0.70%	7,492
Dixie	1,734	45.63%	1,399	36.82%	653	17.18%	14	0.37%	335	8.81%	3,800
Duval	112,328	44.20%	126,959	49.96%	13,850	5.45%	986	0.39%	-14,631	-5.76%	254,123
Escambia	37,838	35.06%	60,997	56.52%	8,597	7.97%	493	0.46%	-23,159	-21.46%	107,925
Flagler	9,585	47.74%	8,234	41.01%	2,185	10.88%	75	0.37%	1,351	6.73%	20,079
Franklin	2,096	45.86%	1,563	34.20%	878	19.21%	33	0.72%	533	11.66%	4,570
Gadsden	9,407	66.25%	3,817	26.88%	938	6.61%	37	0.26%	5,590	39.37%	14,199
Gilchrist	1,985	41.40%	1,939	40.44%	841	17.54%	30	0.63%	46	0.96%	4,795
Glades	1,530	44.59%	1,361	39.67%	521	15.19%	19	0.55%	169	4.92%	3,431
Gulf	2,480	41.39%	2,430	40.55%	1,054	17.59%	28	0.47%	50	0.84%	5,992
Hamilton	1,735	47.24%	1,520	41.38%	406	11.05%	12	0.33%	215	5.86%	3,673
Hardee	2,417	38.95%	2,928	47.18%	851	13.71%	10	0.16%	-511	-8.23%	6,206
Hendry	3,885	43.66%	3,855	43.32%	1,135	12.75%	24	0.27%	30	0.34%	8,899
Hernando	28,524	49.12%	22,046	37.97%	7,272	12.52%	224	0.39%	6,478	11.15%	58,066
Highlands	14,250	42.27%	15,617	46.32%	3,739	11.09%	108	0.32%	-1,367	-4.05%	33,714
Hillsborough	144,266	46.80%	136,656	44.33%	25,156	8.16%	2,193	0.71%	7,610	2.47%	308,271
Holmes	2,312	33.98%	3,249	47.75%	1,208	17.75%	35	0.51%	-937	-13.77%	6,804
Indian River	16,375	37.24%	22,714	51.66%	4,637	10.55%	246	0.56%	-6,339	-14.42%	43,972
Jackson	6,667	42.98%	7,189	46.34%	1,602	10.33%	55	0.35%	-522	-3.36%	15,513
Jefferson	2,544	52.90%	1,851	38.49%	393	8.17%	21	0.44%	693	14.41%	4,809
Lafayette	829	35.70%	1,166	50.22%	316	13.61%	11	0.47%	-337	-14.52%	2,322
Lake	29,752	40.25%	35,097	47.48%	8,815	11.92%	259	0.35%	-5,345	-7.23%	73,923
Lee	65,699	39.59%	80,898	48.75%	18,394	11.08%	960	0.58%	-15,199	-9.16%	165,951
Leon	50,072	54.59%	33,930	36.99%	6,673	7.28%	1,042	1.14%	16,142	17.60%	91,717
Levy	4,938	44.63%	4,299	38.85%	1,774	16.03%	54	0.49%	639	5.78%	11,065
Liberty	868	40.11%	913	42.19%	376	17.38%	7	0.32%	-45	-2.08%	2,164
Madison	2,794	50.01%	2,195	39.29%	578	10.35%	20	0.36%	599	10.72%	5,587
Manatee	41,891	43.24%	44,136	45.56%	10,363	10.70%	488	0.50%	-2,245	-2.32%	96,878
Marion	37,045	41.08%	41,409	45.92%	11,341	12.58%	376	0.42%	-4,364	-4.84%	90,171
Martin	20,855	38.16%	28,522	52.18%	5,005	9.16%	274	0.50%	-7,667	-14.02%	54,656
Miami-Dade	317,555	57.34%	209,740	37.87%	24,729	4.47%	1,758	0.32%	107,815	19.47%	553,782
Monroe	15,251	46.86%	12,076	37.11%	4,824	14.82%	393	1.21%	3,175	9.75%	32,544
Nassau	7,277	34.38%	12,141	57.36%	1,657	7.83%	92	0.43%	-4,864	-22.98%	21,167
Okaloosa	16,462	26.11%	40,683	64.53%	5,433	8.62%	466	0.74%	-24,221	-38.42%	63,044
Okeechobee	4,826	48.55%	3,418	34.38%	1,666	16.76%	31	0.31%	1,408	14.17%	9,941
Orange	105,539	45.66%	106,059	45.89%	18,196	7.87%	1,332	0.58%	-520	-0.23%	231,126
Osceola	21,874	47.05%	18,337	39.44%	6,092	13.10%	188	0.40%	3,537	7.61%	46,491
Palm Beach	230,687	58.06%	133,811	33.68%	30,744	7.74%	2,112	0.53%	96,876	24.38%	397,354
Pasco	66,475	49.80%	48,355	36.23%	18,013	13.50%	628	0.47%	18,120	13.57%	133,471
Pinellas	184,748	49.10%	152,155	40.44%	36,994	9.83%	2,375	0.63%	32,593	8.66%	376,272
Polk	66,747	44.45%	67,962	45.26%	14,993	9.98%	471	0.31%	-1,215	-0.81%	150,173
Putnam	12,010	47.75%	9,786	38.91%	3,272	13.01%	84	0.33%	2,224	8.84%	25,152
St. Johns	16,716	34.43%	27,318	56.27%	4,205	8.66%	310	0.64%	-10,602	-21.84%	48,549
St. Lucie	36,169	48.94%	28,899	39.10%	8,483	11.48%	355	0.48%	7,270	9.84%	73,906
Santa Rosa	10,936	25.79%	26,301	62.02%	4,961	11.70%	212	0.50%	-15,365	-36.23%	42,410
Sarasota	63,665	42.73%	69,213	46.46%	14,941	10.03%	1,167	0.78%	-5,548	-3.73%	148,986
Seminole	45,058	39.21%	59,797	52.04%	9,357	8.14%	692	0.60%	-14,739	-12.83%	114,904
Sumter	7,017	45.56%	5,960	38.70%	2,375	15.42%	48	0.31%	1,057	6.86%	15,400
Suwannee	4,479	36.88%	5,742	47.28%	1,874	15.43%	49	0.40%	-1,263	-10.40%	12,144
Taylor	3,583	44.80%	3,188	39.86%	1,140	14.26%	86	1.08%	395	4.94%	7,997
Union	1,388	40.09%	1,636	47.26%	425	12.28%	13	0.38%	-248	-7.17%	3,462
Volusia	78,919	49.28%	63,091	39.39%	17,320	10.81%	828	0.52%	15,828	9.89%	160,158
Wakulla	3,056	42.63%	2,933	40.91%	1,091	15.22%	89	1.24%	123	1.72%	7,169
Walton	5,342	34.42%	7,709	49.68%	2,342	15.09%	125	0.81%	-2,367	-15.26%	15,518
Washington	2,992	38.06%	3,524	44.83%	1,287	16.37%	58	0.74%	-532	-6.77%	7,861
Totals	2,546,870	48.02%	2,244,536	42.32%	483,870	9.12%	28,518	0.54%	302,334	5.70%	5,303,794

Counties that flipped from Republican to Democratic

- Calhoun
- Citrus
- Franklin
- Gulf
- Hendry
- Hillsborough
- Osceola
- St. Lucie
- Taylor
- Wakulla

==== By congressional district ====
Despite losing the state, Dole won 12 of 23 congressional districts, while the remaining 11 were won by Clinton, including three which elected Republicans.

District	Clinton	Dole	Perot	Representative
1st	31%	59%	10%	Joe Scarborough
2nd	47.8%	41.5%	10.6%	Pete Peterson
2nd	47.8%	41.5%	10.6%	Allen Boyd
3rd	58.5%	34.9%	6.7%	Corrine Brown
4th	37%	56%	7%	Tillie Fowler
5th	50%	37%	13%	Karen Thurman
6th	39%	50%	11%	Cliff Stearns
7th	43%	47%	10%	John Mica
8th	44%	47.5%	8.6%	Bill McCollum
9th	44.7%	45%	10.3%	Michael Bilirakis
10th	52%	38%	10%	Bill Young
11th	52%	40%	8%	Sam Gibbons
11th	52%	40%	8%	Jim Davis
12th	43%	47%	10%	Charles T. Canady
13th	43%	47%	10%	Dan Miller
14th	38%	51%	11%	Porter Goss
15th	41%	46%	13%	Dave Weldon
16th	47%	42%	11%	Mark Foley
17th	85%	12%	3%	Carrie Meek
18th	43%	52%	5%	Ileana Ros-Lehtinen
19th	65%	28%	7%	Harry Johnston
19th	65%	28%	7%	Robert Wexler
20th	59%	31%	10%	Peter Deutsch
21st	44.7%	50.5%	4.8%	Lincoln Díaz-Balart
22nd	54.5%	37.9%	7.6%	Clay Shaw
23rd	75%	19%	6%	Alcee Hastings

== Exit poll ==
Demographic	Clinton	Dole	Perot	Share
Gender
Men	42	47	10	49
Women	52	41	7	51
White Gender
Men	37	52	11	48
Women	48	45	8	52
Race
White	43	48	9	78
Black	87	10	3	10
Latino	44	46	7	11
Age
18-29	46	45	8	14
30-44	46	41	12	30
45-59	46	47	7	24
60+	50	43	7	31
