= 1964 United States presidential election in Florida =

- November 3, 1964
- Turnout: 74% ▼

Nominee	Lyndon B. Johnson	Barry Goldwater
Party	Democratic	Republican
Home state	Texas	Arizona
Running mate	Hubert Humphrey	William E. Miller
Electoral vote	14	0
Popular vote	948,540	905,941
Percentage	51.15%	48.85%
County results
Johnson
50–60%
60–70%
Goldwater
50–60%
60–70%
70–80%
President before election
Lyndon B. Johnson
Democratic
Elected President
Lyndon B. Johnson
Democratic

The 1964 United States presidential election in Florida was held November 3, 1964. All contemporary fifty states and the District of Columbia took part, and Florida voters selected fourteen electors to the Electoral College, who voted for president and vice president.

Although Johnson won the state amidst his national landslide, Florida weighed in as a massive 20.28% more Republican than the nation at large, and was the second-closest state won by Johnson, after Idaho. Johnson carried 20 of the state's 67 counties, although in only two of them, Monroe and Dade, did he exceed his nationwide vote share of 61.05%.

As of the 2024 presidential election, this is the last election in which the Democratic candidate carried Charlotte County.

== Campaign ==
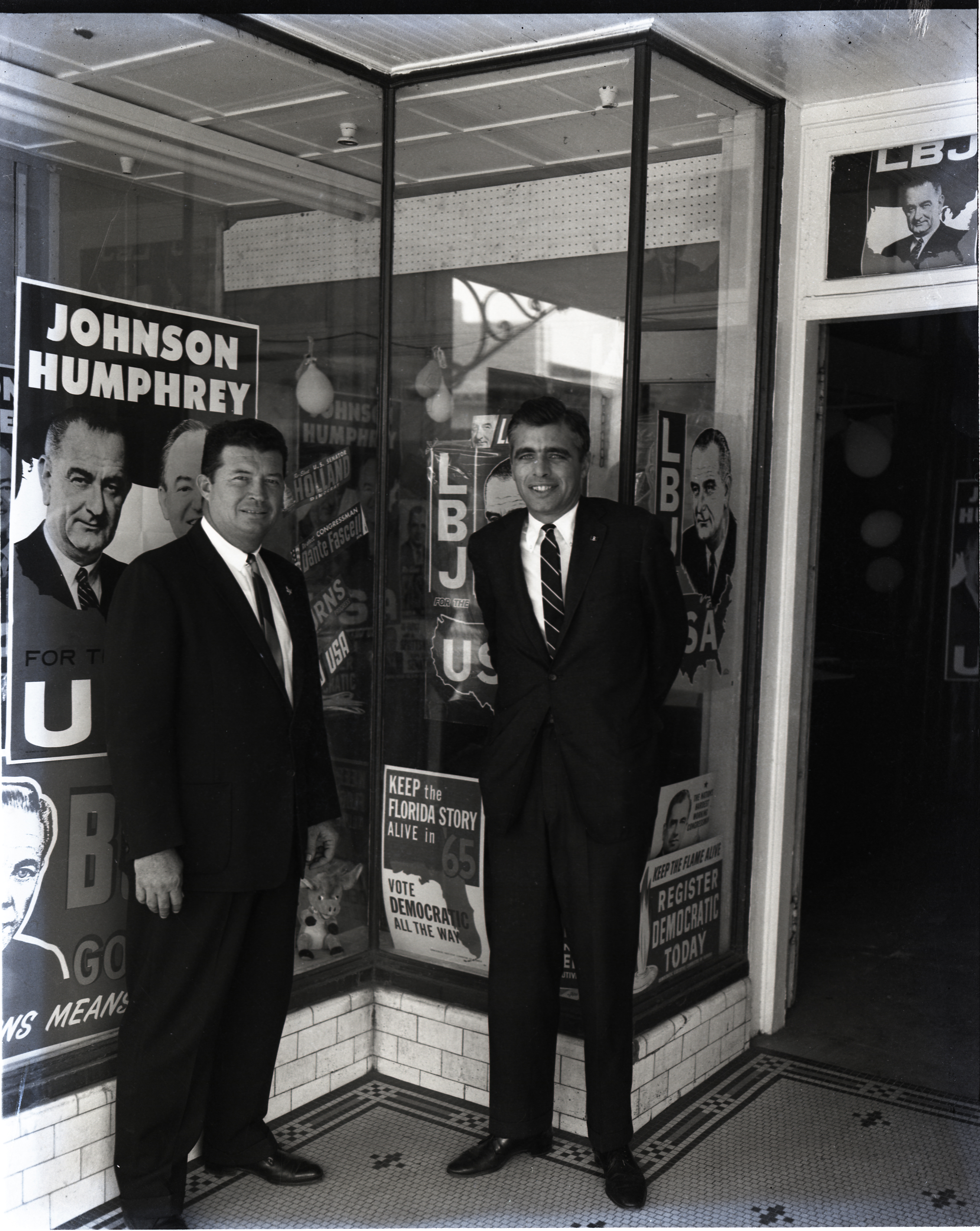
A Lyndon B. Johnson campaign office in Key West.

Retirement communities further south who were supportive of Republicans in presidential elections over the previous fifteen years, were opposed to Barry Goldwater’s desire to privatize Social Security and his criticism of the United States' space program.

Lyndon B. Johnson won Florida by 42,599 votes, a margin of 2.30%, or a swing of 5.32% from the 1960 result. Increased registration of black voters, which reached 51%, was crucial to Johnson regaining Florida. In the northern counties of Lafayette and Liberty, where no black people were registered, massive swings toward Goldwater by white voters were completely unmitigated.

== Results ==
Dot map of results by county

1964 United States presidential election in Florida
Party	Candidate	Running mate	Popular vote		Electoral vote	
Party	Candidate	Running mate	Count	%	Count	%
Democratic	Lyndon Baines Johnson of Texas (incumbent)	Hubert Horatio Humphrey of Minnesota	948,540	51.15%	14	100.00%
Republican	Barry Goldwater of Arizona	William E. Miller of New York	905,941	48.85%	0	0.00%
Total			1,854,841	100.00%	14	100.00%

=== Results by county ===
County	Lyndon B. Johnson Democratic		Barry Goldwater Republican		Margin		Total votes cast
County	#	%	#	%	#	%	Total votes cast
Alachua	13,483	54.73%	11,151	45.27%	2,332	9.46%	24,634
Baker	1,137	50.35%	1,121	49.65%	16	0.70%	2,258
Bay	7,846	37.91%	12,849	62.09%	-5,003	-24.18%	20,695
Bradford	2,320	53.87%	1,987	46.13%	333	7.74%	4,307
Brevard	24,833	50.29%	24,551	49.71%	282	0.58%	49,384
Broward	68,406	44.51%	85,264	55.49%	-16,858	-10.98%	153,670
Calhoun	980	35.34%	1,793	64.66%	-813	-29.32%	2,773
Charlotte	4,831	53.71%	4,163	46.29%	668	7.42%	8,994
Citrus	2,521	51.98%	2,329	48.02%	192	3.96%	4,850
Clay	3,114	45.01%	3,805	54.99%	-691	-9.98%	6,919
Collier	2,877	44.55%	3,581	55.45%	-704	-10.90%	6,458
Columbia	3,249	43.94%	4,145	56.06%	-896	-12.12%	7,394
Dade	208,941	64.01%	117,480	35.99%	91,461	28.02%	326,421
DeSoto	1,777	47.22%	1,986	52.78%	-209	-5.56%	3,763
Dixie	923	50.41%	908	49.59%	15	0.82%	1,831
Duval	79,365	49.45%	81,116	50.55%	-1,751	-1.10%	160,481
Escambia	25,371	43.91%	32,414	56.09%	-7,043	-12.18%	57,785
Flagler	940	56.69%	718	43.31%	222	13.38%	1,658
Franklin	1,366	49.05%	1,419	50.95%	-53	-1.90%	2,785
Gadsden	4,556	46.67%	5,207	53.33%	-651	-6.66%	9,763
Gilchrist	711	56.83%	540	43.17%	171	13.66%	1,251
Glades	441	44.91%	541	55.09%	-100	-10.18%	982
Gulf	1,659	45.33%	2,001	54.67%	-342	-9.34%	3,660
Hamilton	1,302	52.93%	1,158	47.07%	144	5.86%	2,460
Hardee	1,908	45.12%	2,321	54.88%	-413	-9.76%	4,229
Hendry	1,352	45.04%	1,650	54.96%	-298	-9.92%	3,002
Hernando	2,320	49.82%	2,337	50.18%	-17	-0.36%	4,657
Highlands	4,233	47.14%	4,747	52.86%	-514	-5.72%	8,980
Hillsborough	71,289	58.48%	50,616	41.52%	20,673	16.96%	121,905
Holmes	1,193	27.00%	3,225	73.00%	-2,032	-46.00%	4,418
Indian River	5,122	45.28%	6,191	54.72%	-1,069	-9.44%	11,313
Jackson	4,386	38.31%	7,064	61.69%	-2,678	-23.38%	11,450
Jefferson	1,504	47.18%	1,684	52.82%	-180	-5.64%	3,188
Lafayette	545	45.68%	648	54.32%	-103	-8.64%	1,193
Lake	7,773	37.61%	12,897	62.39%	-5,124	-24.78%	20,670
Lee	10,204	44.19%	12,886	55.81%	-2,682	-11.62%	23,090
Leon	10,927	41.85%	15,181	58.15%	-4,254	-16.30%	26,108
Levy	1,986	55.69%	1,580	44.31%	406	11.38%	3,566
Liberty	377	29.29%	910	70.71%	-533	-41.42%	1,287
Madison	2,121	42.91%	2,822	57.09%	-701	-14.18%	4,943
Manatee	13,074	43.26%	17,147	56.74%	-4,073	-13.48%	30,221
Marion	9,112	45.58%	10,879	54.42%	-1,767	-8.84%	19,991
Martin	3,621	45.76%	4,292	54.24%	-671	-8.48%	7,913
Monroe	8,936	64.86%	4,842	35.14%	4,094	29.72%	13,778
Nassau	2,781	47.02%	3,134	52.98%	-353	-5.96%	5,915
Okaloosa	7,890	44.20%	9,961	55.80%	-2,071	-11.60%	17,851
Okeechobee	1,016	43.57%	1,316	56.43%	-300	-12.86%	2,332
Orange	38,248	43.90%	48,884	56.10%	-10,636	-12.20%	87,132
Osceola	3,531	43.88%	4,516	56.12%	-985	-12.24%	8,047
Palm Beach	43,836	46.91%	49,614	53.09%	-5,778	-6.18%	93,450
Pasco	8,135	51.68%	7,606	48.32%	529	3.36%	15,741
Pinellas	98,381	55.02%	80,414	44.98%	17,967	10.04%	178,795
Polk	29,355	44.98%	35,906	55.02%	-6,551	-10.04%	65,261
Putnam	4,995	49.62%	5,072	50.38%	-77	-0.76%	10,067
St. Johns	4,357	36.90%	7,450	63.10%	-3,093	-26.20%	11,807
St. Lucie	7,748	51.82%	7,204	48.18%	544	3.64%	14,952
Santa Rosa	3,570	37.37%	5,983	62.63%	-2,413	-25.26%	9,553
Sarasota	13,937	38.87%	21,917	61.13%	-7,980	-22.26%	35,854
Seminole	9,125	47.52%	10,078	52.48%	-953	-4.96%	19,203
Sumter	2,259	58.07%	1,631	41.93%	628	16.14%	3,890
Suwannee	2,393	44.36%	3,002	55.64%	-609	-11.28%	5,395
Taylor	1,708	39.09%	2,661	60.91%	-953	-21.82%	4,369
Union	740	51.03%	710	48.97%	30	2.06%	1,450
Volusia	34,901	58.28%	24,988	41.72%	9,913	16.56%	59,889
Wakulla	753	37.22%	1,270	62.78%	-517	-25.56%	2,023
Walton	2,449	39.49%	3,753	60.51%	-1,304	-21.02%	6,202
Washington	1,500	35.50%	2,725	64.50%	-1,225	-29.00%	4,225
Totals	948,540	51.15%	905,941	48.85%	42,599	2.30%	1,854,481

== Works cited ==
- Black, Earl; Black, Merle (1992). The Vital South: How Presidents Are Elected. Harvard University Press. ISBN 0674941306.
