= 1976 United States presidential election in Florida =

- November 2, 1976
- Turnout: ▲77%

| Nominee | Jimmy Carter | Gerald Ford |
| Party | Democratic | Republican |
| Home state | Georgia | Michigan |
| Running mate | Walter Mondale | Bob Dole |
| Electoral vote | 17 | 0 |
| Popular vote | 1,636,000 | 1,469,531 |
| Percentage | 51.93% | 46.64% |
County results
Carter
50–60%
60–70%
70–80%
Ford
40–50%
50–60%
60–70%
President before election
Gerald Ford
Republican
Elected President
Jimmy Carter
Democratic

The 1976 United States presidential election in Florida took place on November 2, 1976. All fifty states and the District of Columbia were part of the 1976 United States presidential election. Florida voters chose seventeen electors to the Electoral College, who voted for president and vice president. Florida was won by Georgia Governor Jimmy Carter by a margin of 5.29%, giving him the state's 17 electoral votes.

As of the 2024 presidential election, this is the last election in which Polk County, Brevard County, Marion County, Bay County, Holmes County, Washington County, DeSoto County, Hardee County, Nassau County, St. Johns County, and Walton County voted for a Democratic presidential candidate.

The Democratic primary in Florida was held on March 9, 1976. The Florida primary was the first to be held in the South with Jimmy Carter defeating the two other serious candidates: George Wallace and Henry Jackson; with Carter getting 34% of the vote and Wallace at 31% while Jackson got 24%. Carter winning the primaries is credited with helping him win the rest of the South and eliminating Wallace from the race. Florida held its Republican primary on March 9 also. In Florida's Republican primary, Gerald Ford won making it one of the first five held in the primaries and all.

Among white voters, 51% supported Ford while 47% supported Carter.

== Primary elections ==
=== Republican primary ===
In the 1976 Florida Republican presidential primary, Florida followed a winner take all system.

1976 Florida Republican primary results
| Candidate | Voted received | |
| Candidate | # | % |
|---|---|---|
| Gerald R. Ford | 321,982 | 52.80% |
| Ronald Reagan | 287,837 | 47.20% |

=== Democratic primary ===
For Florida's 1976 Democratic presidential primary, delegates were given in proportion to the vote received.

1976 Florida Democratic primary results
| Candidate | Voted received | |
| Candidate | # | % |
|---|---|---|
| Jimmy Carter | 448,844 | 34.52% |
| George Wallace | 396,820 | 30.52% |
| Henry M. Jackson | 310,944 | 23.91% |
| Milton Shapp | 32,198 | 2.48% |
| Birch Bayh | 27,235 | 0.67% |
| Arthur Blessitt | 7,889 | 0.61% |
| Ellen McCormack | 7,595 | 0.58% |
| Sargent Shriver | 7,084 | 0.55% |
| Fred R. Harris | 5,397 | 0.42 |
| Robert Byrd | 5,042 | 0.39 |
| Frank Church | 4,906 | 0.38 |
| No preference | 37,626 | 2.89% |

== Results ==
Electoral results
| Presidential candidate | Party | Home state | Popular vote | | Electoral vote | Running mate | | |
| Presidential candidate | Party | Home state | Count | Percentage | Electoral vote | Vice-presidential candidate | Home state | Electoral vote |
|---|---|---|---|---|---|---|---|---|
| Jimmy Carter | Democratic | Georgia | 1,636,000 | 51.93% | 17 | Walter Mondale | Minnesota | 17 |
| Gerald Ford (incumbent) | Republican | Michigan | 1,469,531 | 46.64% | 0 | Bob Dole | Kansas | 0 |
| Eugene McCarthy | Independent | Minnesota | 23,643 | 0.75% | 0 | Sharon Stone Kilpatrick | Virginia | 0 |
| Thomas J. Anderson | American | Tennessee | 21,325 | 0.68% | 0 | Rufus Shackelford | Florida | 0 |
| Roger MacBride | Libertarian | Virginia | 103 | 0.00% | 0 | David Bergland | California | 0 |
| Julius Levin | Socialist Labor | New Jersey | 19 | 0.00% | 0 | Constance Blomen | Massachusetts | 0 |
| Frank Zeidler | Socialist | Wisconsin | 8 | 0.00% | 0 | J. Quinn Brisben | Illinois | 0 |
| Ernest Miller | Write-in | — | 2 | 0.00% | 0 | — | — | 0 |
| Total | | | 3,150,631 | 100% | 17 | | | 17 |
| Needed to win | | | | | 270 | | | 270 |

=== Results by county ===
| County | Jimmy Carter Democratic | | Gerald Ford Republican | | Various candidates Other parties | | Margin | | Total votes cast |
| County | # | % | # | % | # | % | # | % | Total votes cast |
|---|---|---|---|---|---|---|---|---|---|
| Alachua | 27,895 | 62.58% | 15,546 | 34.87% | 1,137 | 2.55% | 12,349 | 27.71% | 44,578 |
| Baker | 2,985 | 71.16% | 1,058 | 25.22% | 152 | 3.62% | 1,927 | 45.94% | 4,195 |
| Bay | 14,858 | 50.39% | 14,208 | 48.19% | 418 | 1.42% | 650 | 2.20% | 29,484 |
| Bradford | 3,868 | 68.86% | 1,680 | 29.91% | 69 | 1.23% | 2,188 | 38.95% | 5,617 |
| Brevard | 46,421 | 50.26% | 44,470 | 48.15% | 1,473 | 1.59% | 1,951 | 2.11% | 92,364 |
| Broward | 176,491 | 51.55% | 161,411 | 47.15% | 4,441 | 1.30% | 15,080 | 4.40% | 342,343 |
| Calhoun | 2,487 | 67.42% | 1,153 | 31.26% | 49 | 1.33% | 1,334 | 36.16% | 3,689 |
| Charlotte | 10,300 | 44.14% | 12,703 | 54.44% | 330 | 1.41% | -2,403 | -10.30% | 23,333 |
| Citrus | 9,438 | 53.30% | 7,973 | 45.03% | 296 | 1.67% | 1,465 | 8.27% | 17,707 |
| Clay | 8,410 | 49.04% | 8,468 | 49.38% | 270 | 1.57% | -58 | -0.34% | 17,148 |
| Collier | 8,764 | 36.96% | 14,643 | 61.76% | 303 | 1.28% | -5,879 | -24.80% | 23,710 |
| Columbia | 6,683 | 62.08% | 3,947 | 36.66% | 136 | 1.26% | 2,736 | 25.42% | 10,766 |
| Dade | 303,047 | 58.06% | 211,148 | 40.45% | 7,747 | 1.48% | 91,899 | 17.61% | 521,942 |
| DeSoto | 2,715 | 56.30% | 2,000 | 41.48% | 107 | 2.22% | 715 | 14.82% | 4,822 |
| Dixie | 2,169 | 78.82% | 558 | 20.28% | 25 | 0.91% | 1,611 | 58.54% | 2,752 |
| Duval | 105,912 | 58.01% | 74,997 | 41.08% | 1,652 | 0.90% | 30,915 | 16.93% | 182,561 |
| Escambia | 38,279 | 47.42% | 41,471 | 51.38% | 965 | 1.20% | -3,192 | -3.96% | 80,715 |
| Flagler | 2,086 | 61.84% | 1,262 | 37.41% | 25 | 0.74% | 824 | 24.43% | 3,373 |
| Franklin | 1,859 | 62.53% | 1,054 | 35.45% | 60 | 2.02% | 805 | 27.08% | 2,973 |
| Gadsden | 6,798 | 65.17% | 3,531 | 33.85% | 102 | 0.98% | 3,267 | 31.32% | 10,431 |
| Gilchrist | 1,807 | 76.76% | 528 | 22.43% | 19 | 0.81% | 1,279 | 54.33% | 2,354 |
| Glades | 1,311 | 66.72% | 624 | 31.76% | 30 | 1.53% | 687 | 34.96% | 1,965 |
| Gulf | 2,641 | 61.69% | 1,584 | 37.00% | 56 | 1.31% | 1,057 | 24.69% | 4,281 |
| Hamilton | 2,053 | 69.57% | 794 | 26.91% | 104 | 3.52% | 1,259 | 42.66% | 2,951 |
| Hardee | 2,670 | 52.28% | 2,189 | 42.86% | 248 | 4.86% | 481 | 9.42% | 5,107 |
| Hendry | 2,337 | 54.94% | 1,843 | 43.32% | 74 | 1.74% | 494 | 11.62% | 4,254 |
| Hernando | 7,717 | 56.20% | 5,793 | 42.19% | 222 | 1.62% | 1,924 | 14.01% | 13,732 |
| Highlands | 7,218 | 45.88% | 8,317 | 52.86% | 198 | 1.26% | -1,099 | -6.98% | 15,733 |
| Hillsborough | 94,589 | 54.01% | 78,504 | 44.82% | 2,052 | 1.17% | 16,085 | 9.19% | 175,145 |
| Holmes | 3,256 | 62.86% | 1,850 | 35.71% | 74 | 1.43% | 1,406 | 27.15% | 5,180 |
| Indian River | 8,512 | 45.63% | 9,818 | 52.63% | 324 | 1.74% | -1,306 | -7.00% | 18,654 |
| Jackson | 7,687 | 60.76% | 4,795 | 37.90% | 170 | 1.34% | 2,892 | 22.86% | 12,652 |
| Jefferson | 2,310 | 61.62% | 1,361 | 36.30% | 78 | 2.08% | 949 | 25.32% | 3,749 |
| Lafayette | 1,126 | 67.63% | 523 | 31.41% | 16 | 0.96% | 603 | 36.22% | 1,665 |
| Lake | 14,369 | 41.31% | 19,976 | 57.42% | 442 | 1.27% | -5,607 | -16.11% | 34,787 |
| Lee | 30,567 | 43.80% | 38,038 | 54.50% | 1,184 | 1.70% | -7,471 | -10.70% | 69,789 |
| Leon | 28,729 | 53.76% | 23,739 | 44.42% | 975 | 1.82% | 4,990 | 9.34% | 53,443 |
| Levy | 4,025 | 65.28% | 1,965 | 31.87% | 176 | 2.85% | 2,060 | 33.41% | 6,166 |
| Liberty | 1,137 | 64.02% | 620 | 34.91% | 19 | 1.07% | 517 | 29.11% | 1,776 |
| Madison | 3,218 | 63.85% | 1,761 | 34.94% | 61 | 1.21% | 1,457 | 28.91% | 5,040 |
| Manatee | 24,342 | 44.78% | 29,300 | 53.90% | 718 | 1.32% | -4,958 | -9.12% | 54,360 |
| Marion | 16,963 | 50.37% | 16,163 | 47.99% | 553 | 1.64% | 800 | 2.38% | 33,679 |
| Martin | 8,785 | 42.33% | 11,682 | 56.28% | 289 | 1.39% | -2,897 | -13.95% | 20,756 |
| Monroe | 11,079 | 56.08% | 8,232 | 41.67% | 446 | 2.26% | 2,847 | 14.41% | 19,757 |
| Nassau | 5,896 | 64.51% | 3,136 | 34.31% | 108 | 1.18% | 2,760 | 30.20% | 9,140 |
| Okaloosa | 14,210 | 42.68% | 18,598 | 55.86% | 487 | 1.46% | -4,388 | -13.18% | 33,295 |
| Okeechobee | 3,184 | 65.99% | 1,598 | 33.12% | 43 | 0.89% | 1,586 | 32.87% | 4,825 |
| Orange | 58,442 | 44.80% | 70,451 | 54.01% | 1,544 | 1.18% | -12,009 | -9.21% | 130,437 |
| Osceola | 6,893 | 48.63% | 7,062 | 49.82% | 220 | 1.55% | -169 | -1.19% | 14,175 |
| Palm Beach | 96,705 | 48.68% | 98,236 | 49.45% | 3,716 | 1.87% | -1,531 | -0.77% | 198,657 |
| Pasco | 33,710 | 53.72% | 28,306 | 45.11% | 731 | 1.16% | 5,404 | 8.61% | 62,747 |
| Pinellas | 141,879 | 48.00% | 150,003 | 50.75% | 3,687 | 1.25% | -8,124 | -2.75% | 295,569 |
| Polk | 47,286 | 51.01% | 44,238 | 47.72% | 1,182 | 1.27% | 3,048 | 3.29% | 92,706 |
| Putnam | 9,597 | 64.81% | 5,040 | 34.03% | 172 | 1.16% | 4,557 | 30.78% | 14,809 |
| St. Johns | 7,412 | 51.58% | 6,660 | 46.34% | 299 | 2.08% | 752 | 5.24% | 14,371 |
| St. Lucie | 12,386 | 51.16% | 11,502 | 47.51% | 321 | 1.33% | 884 | 3.65% | 24,209 |
| Santa Rosa | 8,020 | 46.06% | 9,122 | 52.39% | 270 | 1.55% | -1,102 | -6.33% | 17,412 |
| Sarasota | 26,293 | 36.78% | 44,157 | 61.78% | 1,028 | 1.44% | -17,864 | -25.00% | 71,478 |
| Seminole | 19,609 | 41.89% | 26,655 | 56.94% | 549 | 1.17% | -7,046 | -15.05% | 46,813 |
| Sumter | 4,721 | 66.59% | 2,212 | 31.20% | 157 | 2.21% | 2,509 | 35.39% | 7,090 |
| Suwannee | 4,718 | 63.74% | 2,405 | 32.49% | 279 | 3.77% | 2,313 | 31.25% | 7,402 |
| Taylor | 3,370 | 62.34% | 1,983 | 36.68% | 53 | 0.98% | 1,387 | 25.66% | 5,406 |
| Union | 1,480 | 72.55% | 544 | 26.67% | 16 | 0.78% | 936 | 45.88% | 2,040 |
| Volusia | 49,161 | 55.72% | 37,523 | 42.53% | 1,541 | 1.75% | 11,638 | 13.19% | 88,225 |
| Wakulla | 2,353 | 57.78% | 1,580 | 38.80% | 139 | 3.41% | 773 | 18.98% | 4,072 |
| Walton | 5,196 | 62.76% | 2,927 | 35.35% | 156 | 1.88% | 2,269 | 27.41% | 8,279 |
| Washington | 3,566 | 59.47% | 2,313 | 38.58% | 117 | 1.95% | 1,253 | 20.89% | 5,996 |
| Totals | 1,636,000 | 51.93% | 1,469,531 | 46.64% | 45,100 | 1.43% | 166,469 | 5.29% | 3,150,631 |

=== Results by congressional district ===
Carter won 8 of the 15 congressional districts, and each candidate won two districts held by the other party.

| District | Ford | Carter |
|---|---|---|
| 1st | 50.7% | 49.3% |
| 2nd | 37.4% | 62.6% |
| 3rd | 37.5% | 64.3% |
| 4th | 46.7% | 53.3% |
| 5th | 50.1% | 49.9% |
| 6th | 50.5% | 49.5% |
| 7th | 45.7% | 54.3% |
| 8th | 52.5% | 47.5% |
| 9th | 53.5% | 46.5% |
| 10th | 54.4% | 45.6% |
| 11th | 50.5% | 49.5% |
| 12th | 46.5% | 53.5% |
| 13th | 33.5% | 66.5% |
| 14th | 43.5% | 56.5% |
| 15th | 46.7% | 54.3% |

== Works cited ==
- Black, Earl; Black, Merle (1992). The Vital South: How Presidents Are Elected. Harvard University Press. ISBN 0674941306.
