= List of county roads in Levy County, Florida =

List of names of county roads

- County road shields used in Florida

Highway names
- Interstates: Interstate X (I-X)
- US Highways: U.S. Highway X (US X)
- State: State Road X (SR X)
- County: County Road X (CR X)

System links
- County roads in Florida; County roads in Levy County

The following is a list of county roads in Levy County, Florida. All county roads are maintained by the county in which they reside.

== County roads ==
#	Road Name(s)	Direction and Termini					Notes
CR 24	Picnic Street; Main Street	W–E	SR 24	Bronson	US 27 Alt. (SR 500) / Main Street	Bronson	Former SR 24B; Picnic Street is closed in James H. Cobb Park, necessitating a shift onto Main Street.
CR 32	Ishie Avenue	W–E	US 27 Alt. (SR 500)	Northwest of Bronson	SR 24 / NE 92 Court	East Bronson	Former SR 32
CR 32B	Marshburn Drive	S–N	SR 24	Bronson	CR 32	Bronson	Former SR 32B
CR 40	Follow That Dream Parkway	W–E	Bird Creek Boat Ramp	Yankeetown	CR 40	Marion County line east-northeast of Inglis	Former SR 40
CR 40A	63rd Street; SE 193 Place Hammock Road	W–E S–N	Riverside Drive CR 40	Yankeetown Inglis	US 19 / US 98 (SR 55) CR 40A / SE 55 Court	North of Inglis North of Inglis	Former SR 40A
CR 55A	90th Avenue	S–N	US 19 / US 27 Alt. / US 98 (SR 55) / 90 Avenue	Fanning Springs	CR 55A / SW 100 Street	Gilchrist County line in Fanning Springs	Former SR 55A
CR 102	NE 60 Street	W–E	CR 337 US 27 Alt. (SR 500)	South-southeast of Bronson South-southeast of East Bronson	US 27 Alt. (SR 500) / NE 117 Terrace CR 241 / CR 343	South-southeast of East Bronson Southeast of East Bronson	
CR 120	NE 22 Court; NE 107 Place; NE 27 Court	S–N	US 27 Alt. (SR 500)	Northwest of Bronson	CR 339	Northwest of Bronson	
CR 124	NE 10 Avenue	S–N	US 27 Alt. (SR 500)	East of Chiefland			
CR 130	172nd Lane	W–E	US 19 / US 27 Alt. / US 98 (SR 55) / 90 Avenue	Fanning Springs		Fanning Springs	
CR 134	NW 10 Avenue	S–N	Dead end	East-southeast of Chiefland			
CR 203	40th Avenue	S-N	US 27 Alt. (SR 500)	South-southeast of Chiefland	US 129 (SR 49) / CR 137	North-northeast of Chiefland	40th Avenue becomes CR 137 north of US 129
CR 218	NW 150 Street	W–E	US 19 / US 27 Alt. / US 98 (SR 55)	Andrews	CR 341	Andrews	
CR 241	NE 150 Avenue	S–N	US 27 (SR 500)	West-northwest of Williston	CR 241 / SW 191 Avenue	Alachua County line northwest of Raleigh	Former SR 241
CR 311	SE 25 Avenue; SE 26 Terrace	S–N	SE 25 Avenue / 76 Place	South-southwest of Gulf Hammock	US 19 / US 98 (SR 55)	Lower Waccasassa Conservation Area south-southeast of Gulf Hammock	
CR 316	East Levy Street; NE 140 Avenue; NE 20 Street Robert Philpot Way; NE 30 Street	W–E	CR 337 US 41 (SR 45) / SR 121	West of Williston Highlands Williston	SR 121 / NE 20 Street CR 335	South-southwest of Williston Marion County line east-southeast of Williston	Former SR 316 Former SR 323
CR 318	Martin Luther King Jr. Drive	W–E	US 27 (SR 500)	East Williston	CR 335 / CR 318	Marion County line in East Williston	Former SR 318
CR 318A	NE 11 Avenue	W–E	US 27 / US 41 (SR 45) / NE 50 Street	North of Williston	CR 331A / NE 50 Street	East Williston	Former SR 318A
CR 319	10th Avenue	S–N	CR 339 / NW 10 Avenue	East of Fanning Springs	CR 319 / NW 175 Street	Gilchrist County line east of Fanning Springs	Former SR 319
CR 320	NW 120 Street	W–E	US 19 / US 27 Alt. / US 98 (SR 55) / NW 120th Street SR 121	Chiefland Northeast of Raleigh	CR 339 / NW 120 Street CR 320	Northwest of Bronson Marion County line east-northeast of Raleigh	Former SR 320
CR 321	NW 50 Avenue 68 Avenue; SE 72 Avenue; 182 Place	S–N	US 129 (SR 49) / NE 4th Street Dead end	North-northeast of Chiefland Inglis	CR 346A US 19 / US 98 (SR 55)	East-southeast of Fanning Springs North-northeast of Inglis	Former SR 321 Almost entirely a dirt road until it approaches US 19 / US 98 (SR 55)
CR 322	East Levy Street	W–E	US 41 (SR 45)	South-southwest of Williston	NW 130 Street	Marion County line south-southeast of Williston	Former SR 322
CR 323	SE 32 Place NE 200 Avenue; SE 8th Street	S–N	US 41 (SR 45) / CR 326 CR 322	Morriston South of Williston	CR 322 US 27 (SR 500)	South-southeast of Williston Williston	Former SR 316 (north of CR 322) and SR 323
CR 326	SW 78 Place SE 30 Street; SE 32 Place	W–E	Lower Suwannee National Wildlife Refuge Waccasassa Park Boat Ramp	North-northwest of Cedar Key Southwest of Gulf Hammock	CR 347 CR 326	North-northeast of Cedar Key East-southeast of Morriston	Former SR 326
CR 330	NW 70 Street; NW 52 Court NW 50 Avenue	W–E S–N	CR 347 CR 336	Southwest of Chiefland South of Chiefland	CR 347 CR 347	South of Chiefland South of Chiefland	Former SR 330
CR 331A	NE 13th Street	S–N	CR 318	East Williston	SR 121 / NE 205 Avenue	North of East Williston	Former SR 331A
CR 332	NW 50 Street	W–E	CR 336	South-southwest of Chiefland	SR 345 / CR 345 / NW 50 Street	South-southwest of Chiefland	Former SR 332
CR 335	NE 75 Street	W–E	US 27 Alt. (SR 500)	East Bronson	US 27 (SR 500)	South-southeast of East Williston	Former SR 335; partially travels along the Marion County line
CR 335A	NE 167 Court	S–N	SR 121	West-southwest of Williston	CR 343	Southwest of Raleigh	Former SR 335A
CR 336	NW 90 Avenue; NW 40 Street	S–N W–E	CR 336 CR 347	Marion County line southeast of Tidewater South-southwest of Chiefland	US 19 / US 98 (SR 55) SR 24	Lebanon Southwest of Otter Creek	Former SR 336
CR 337	Pennsylvania Avenue Court Street; NE 80 Avenue	S–N	CR 336 / Old Rock Road US 27 Alt. (SR 500)	Goethe State Forest in Tidewater Bronson	US 27 Alt. (SR 500) CR 337 / SW 127 Avenue	Bronson North of Bronson	Former SR 337; portion of northern segment south of Irene Street has speed bumps.
CR 339		S–N	US 27 Alt. (SR 500)	Northwest of Bronson	CR 339 / SE 105 Street	Gilchrist County line east of Fanning Springs	Former SR 339
CR 339A	NE 94 Place NE 20 Avenue	S–N	Un-named road US 27 Alt. (SR 500)	West of Bronson West-northwest of Bronson	US 27 Alt. (SR 500) CR 320	Northwest of Bronson Newton	Former SR 339A
CR 341	NW 60 Avenue; James Monroe Watson Bridge; 14th Street	S–N	CR 336	South-southwest of Chiefland	CR 341 / County Line Road	Gilchrist County line east of Fanning Springs	Former SR 341
CR 343	Ercell Smith Road NE 60 Street	S–N W–E	CR 326 CR 102 / CR 241	Henry Beck Park northeast of Gulf Hammock Southeast of East Bronson	CR 337 US 27 / US 41 (SR 45)	South-southeast of Bronson North of Williston	former SR 343
CR 345	NW 30 Avenue 130 Street	S–N S–N W–E	SR 24 US 27 Alt. (SR 500) / CR 347 US 129 (SR 49) / NW 130 Street	Rosewood Turkey Town North-northeast of Chiefland	SR 345 / CR 332 US 129 (SR 49) CR 339	South-southwest of Chiefland Northeast of Chiefland Northwest of Bronson	Former SR 345
CR 346	NW 140 Street 150 Street	W–E	US 19 / US 27 Alt. / US 98 (SR 55) / NW 140 Street US 129 (SR 49) / NW 150 Street	Andrews East of Andrews	US 129 (SR 49) CR 339 / NE 150 Street	East of Andrews East of Andrews	Former SR 346
CR 346A	NW 165 Street 160 Street	W–E	US 19 / US 27 Alt. / US 98 (SR 55) / NW 165th Street CR 341 / NW 160 Street	Fanning Springs Andrews	CR 341 / NW 165 Street CR 339 / NE 160 Street	Andrews East of Andrews	Former SR 346A
CR 347	NW 60 Street; NW 30 Avenue	S–N	SR 24 CR 346	North-northeast of Cedar Key East of Andrews	US 27 Alt. / CR 345 CR 347 / SE 105 Street	Turkey Town Gilchrist County line east of Fanning Springs	Former SR 347
CR 424	55th Avenue						
CR 464	SE 60 Street	W–E	SR 121	South-southwest of Williston Highlands	CR 464B	Marion County line southeast of Morriston	Former SR 464
