= Florida State Road 345 =

Highway in Florida

State Road 345
- SR 345 in red, segments of CR 345 in blue

Route information
- Maintained by FDOT
- Length: 7.630 mi (12.279 km)

Major junctions
- South end: CR 332 at Curryville
- US 19 / US 98 near Chiefland
- North end: US 27 Alt. near Chiefland

Location
- Country: United States
- State: Florida
- Counties: Levy

Highway system
- Florida State Highway System; Interstate; US; State; Former; Pre‑1945; Toll; Scenic
← SR 331	→ SR 349

State Road 345 (SR 345) is a north–south route in the Big Bend area of Florida, running from U.S. Route 27 Alternate (US 27 Alt.) east of Chiefland to County Road 332 (CR 332) southwest of Chiefland. South of CR 332, the road becomes County Road 345 as it runs towards Rosewood.

Another piece of CR 345 begins at US 27 Alt. about 1 mile (1.6 km) east of the north end of SR 345 and runs north to the curve on SR 49. A third section goes east from a point about 1/2 mile (0.80 km) north on SR 49 to CR 339.

== Major intersections ==
The entire route is in Levy County.

Location	mi	km	Destinations	Notes
Rosewood	0.000	0.000	SR 24 – Cedar Key	
	10.1	16.3	CR 336 east	south end of CR 336 overlap
	11.6	18.7	CR 336 west (Northwest 40th Street)	north end of CR 336 overlap
	12.573	20.234	south end of state maintenance	
Curryville	12.607	20.289	CR 332 west (Northwest 50th Street)	
	13.577	21.850	CR 347 (Northwest 60th Street)	
	14.579	23.463	CR 330 (Northwest 70th Street) – Fowlers Bluff, Lower Suwannee National Wildlife Refuge	
Chiefland	18.551	29.855	CR 341 (Southwest 14th Street)	
Chiefland	19.331	31.110	US 19 / US 98 (Main Street / SR 55) – Fanning Springs, Inglis, St. Petersburg	
Chiefland	20.203	32.514	US 27 Alt. (SR 500) – Bronson	
1.000 mi = 1.609 km; 1.000 km = 0.621 mi: Concurrency terminus; Route transition
