= Manatee Road, Florida =

- Census-designated place
- Location in Levy County and the state of Florida
- Coordinates: 29°30′27″N 82°55′14″W
- Country: United States
- State: Florida
- County: Levy

Area
  - Total: 13.00 sq mi (33.68 km^{2})
  - Land: 13.00 sq mi (33.68 km^{2})
  - Water: 0 sq mi (0.00 km^{2})
- Elevation: 36 ft (11 m)

Population (2020)
  - Total: 2,484
  - Density: 191.0/sq mi (73.76/km^{2})
- Time zone: UTC-5 (Eastern (EST))
  - Summer (DST): UTC-4 (EDT)
- FIPS code: 12-42787
- GNIS feature ID: 2403253

Manatee Road is a census-designated place (CDP) in Levy County, Florida, United States. The population was 2,484 at the 2020 census, up from 2,244 at the 2010 census. At the 2000 census, the CDP was misspelled as "Manattee Road". It is part of the Gainesville, Florida Metropolitan Statistical Area.

== Geography ==
Manatee Road is located in northwestern Levy County. It is bordered to the east by the city of Chiefland and to the northeast by unincorporated Andrews. Florida State Road 320 (Manatee Springs Road) runs through the southern part of the CDP, leading east to Chiefland and west to its end at Manatee Springs State Park.

According to the United States Census Bureau, the Manatee Road CDP has a total area of 13.0 square miles (33.7 km^{2}), all land.

== Demographics ==
Historical population
Census	Pop.	Note	%±
2000	1,937		—
2010	2,244		15.8%
2020	2,484		10.7%
U.S. Decennial Census

=== 2020 census ===
As of the 2020 census, Manatee Road had a population of 2,484. The median age was 50.6 years. 19.5% of residents were under the age of 18 and 29.5% of residents were 65 years of age or older. For every 100 females there were 99.0 males, and for every 100 females age 18 and over there were 101.2 males age 18 and over.

0.0% of residents lived in urban areas, while 100.0% lived in rural areas.

There were 1,058 households in Manatee Road, of which 23.3% had children under the age of 18 living in them. Of all households, 46.7% were married-couple households, 22.3% were households with a male householder and no spouse or partner present, and 22.1% were households with a female householder and no spouse or partner present. About 26.0% of all households were made up of individuals and 14.4% had someone living alone who was 65 years of age or older.

There were 1,212 housing units, of which 12.7% were vacant. The homeowner vacancy rate was 1.4% and the rental vacancy rate was 2.5%.

Racial composition as of the 2020 census
Race	Number	Percent
White	2,233	89.9%
Black or African American	52	2.1%
American Indian and Alaska Native	9	0.4%
Asian	10	0.4%
Native Hawaiian and Other Pacific Islander	0	0.0%
Some other race	38	1.5%
Two or more races	142	5.7%
Hispanic or Latino (of any race)	109	4.4%

=== 2000 census ===
As of the census of 2000, there were 1,937 people, 852 households, and 593 families residing in the CDP. The population density was 135.4 inhabitants per square mile (52.3/km^{2}). There were 1,009 housing units at an average density of 70.5 per square mile (27.2/km^{2}). The racial makeup of the CDP was 96.75% White, 1.55% African American, 0.10% Native American, 0.05% Asian, 0.46% from other races, and 1.08% from two or more races. Hispanic or Latino of any race were 1.70% of the population.

There were 852 households, out of which 21.6% had children under the age of 18 living with them, 57.6% were married couples living together, 8.8% had a female householder with no husband present, and 30.3% were non-families. 25.9% of all households were made up of individuals, and 13.4% had someone living alone who was 65 years of age or older. The average household size was 2.27 and the average family size was 2.71.

In the CDP, the population was spread out, with 19.4% under the age of 18, 5.8% from 18 to 24, 19.9% from 25 to 44, 28.1% from 45 to 64, and 26.8% who were 65 years of age or older. The median age was 49 years. For every 100 females, there were 94.5 males. For every 100 females age 18 and over, there were 93.8 males.

The median income for a household in the CDP was $22,306, and the median income for a family was $25,174. Males had a median income of $22,417 versus $14,200 for females. The per capita income for the CDP was $13,534. About 17.3% of families and 21.1% of the population were below the poverty line, including 38.3% of those under age 18 and 6.6% of those age 65 or over.
