= Ricky Vanasco =

American baseball player (born 1998)

Free agent
- Pitcher
- Born: October 13, 1998 (age 27); Morriston, Florida, U.S.
- Bats: Right Throws: Right

MLB debut
- April 15, 2024, for the Los Angeles Dodgers

MLB statistics (through 2026 season)
- Win–loss record: 1–1
- Earned run average: 12.19
- Strikeouts: 5
- Stats at Baseball Reference

Teams
- Los Angeles Dodgers (2024); Detroit Tigers (2024, 2026)

Ricky Vanasco (born October 13, 1998) is an American professional baseball pitcher who is a free agent. He has previously played in Major League Baseball (MLB) for the Los Angeles Dodgers and Detroit Tigers.

== Career ==
=== Amateur career ===
Vanasco attended Williston High School in Williston, Florida. In his senior season, he posted a 6–2 record with a 0.53 ERA and 87 strikeouts in 53 innings. Vanasco committed to Stetson University. He was drafted by the Texas Rangers in the 15th round, with the 464th overall selection, of the 2017 MLB draft. He signed with the Rangers for a $200,000 signing bonus.

=== Texas Rangers ===
Vanasco made his professional debut in 2017 with the AZL Rangers of the Rookie-level Arizona League, going 0–1 with a 0.00 ERA and 16 strikeouts over 9 innings. His season was cut short when on August 31, he was struck in the head by a throw from his catcher Sam Huff. He suffered a concussion and missed the rest of the 2017 season. He returned to the AZL Rangers in 2018, going 3–3 with a 4.38 ERA and 25 strikeouts over 24 2/3 innings. He was shut down for the rest of the 2018 season on July 24 after developing elbow inflammation that required rehabilitation. Vanasco split the 2019 season between the Spokane Indians of the Low–A Northwest League and the Hickory Crawdads of the Single–A South Atlantic League, going a combined 3–1 with a 1.81 ERA and 75 strikeouts over 49 2/3 innings. He was named a 2019 Northwest League All-Star. Vanasco did not play in a game in 2020 due to the cancellation of the Minor League Baseball season because of the COVID-19 pandemic. Vanasco underwent Tommy John Surgery in September 2020 after suffering an injury at the Rangers Alternate Training Site. Vanasco spent 2021 recovering from surgery, only returning to game action in the organizational fall instructional league.

On November 19, 2021, Texas added Vanasco to their 40–man roster to protect him from the Rule 5 draft. Vanasco split the 2022 season between Hickory and the Frisco RoughRiders of the Double-A Texas League, going a combined 3–5 with a 4.68 ERA and 118 strikeouts over 92 1/3 innings. He was optioned to Double-A Frisco to begin the 2023 season. On March 29, 2023, it was announced that Vanasco would miss 4–6 weeks after undergoing surgery to repair a torn meniscus in his knee. On May 29, Vanasco was designated for assignment.

=== Los Angeles Dodgers ===
On June 1, 2023, Vanasco was traded to the Los Angeles Dodgers in exchange for Luis Valdez. After one start for the rookie–level Arizona Complex League Dodgers, Vanasco surrendered two runs in an inning pitched for the Double–A Tulsa Drillers. On June 30, Vanasco was designated for assignment. He cleared waivers and was sent outright to Double–A Tulsa on July 5. He pitched in 20 games for Tulsa with a 1–4 record and 1.52 ERA and five games for the Triple-A Oklahoma City Dodgers, where he did not allow a run in 5 1/3 innings. He became a minor league free agent following the season on November 6.

On November 16, 2023, Vanasco re–signed with the Dodgers on a one–year, $900,000 major league contract. He returned to Oklahoma City to begin the 2024 season but was called up to the majors for the first time on April 15. He pitched two scoreless innings that night in his debut against the Washington Nationals and recorded his first major league strikeout of Riley Adams. He pitched in one other major league game, on July 13 against the Detroit Tigers, where he allowed three runs on three hits without recording an out. In 24 games in Oklahoma City, he was 0–2 with a 4.24 ERA. Vanasco was designated for assignment by the Dodgers on July 24.

=== Detroit Tigers ===
On July 29, 2024, the Dodgers traded Vanasco to the Detroit Tigers in exchange for cash considerations. Vanasco was added to the active roster on September 1, as part of the September roster expansion throughout MLB. He recorded his first career win five days later in his Tigers debut against the San Diego Padres. He made two scoreless appearances for Detroit, striking out no batters in two innings pitched. Vanasco was designated for assignment by Detroit on November 19. On November 22, the Tigers non–tendered Vanasco, making him a free agent.

On November 26, 2024, Vanasco re–signed with Detroit on a minor league contract. On July 8, 2025, Vanasco was released by the Tigers. He re-signed with the organization on a new minor league contract two days later, and was subsequently placed on the 60-day injured list.

Vanasco was assigned to Triple-A Toledo to begin the 2026 season. On May 2, 2026, the Tigers selected Vanasco's contract after Will Vest was placed on the injured list. In five appearances for Detroit, he struggled to an 0–1 record and 15.63 ERA with four strikeouts across 6 1/3 innings pitched. Vanasco was designated for assignment by the Tigers on August 24.

=== Atlanta Braves ===
On August 26, 2026, Vanasco was claimed off of waivers by the Atlanta Braves. He made seven appearances for the Triple–A Gwinnett Stripers, struggling to a 7.88 ERA with eight strikeouts over eight innings of work. On September 29, Vanasco was designated for assignment by Atlanta. He elected free agency after clearing waivers on October 1.
