= Manatee (disambiguation) =

A manatee is a large, fully aquatic marine mammal sometimes known as the "sea cow".

Manatee may also refer to:

== Animals ==
Species of the manatee include:

- Amazonian manatee, found in the Amazon Basin of South America
- West African manatee, a species of manatee and is the least studied of the four species of Sirenians
- West Indian manatee, found in Florida, the Greater Antilles, Central America, northern and northeastern South America
- Dwarf manatee, a possible species of manatee that lives in the freshwater habitats of the Amazon, though restricted to one tributary of the Aripuanã River

Manatees are closely related to the dugong and to the extinct Steller's sea cow.

== Places ==
- Manatee County, Florida, a county in west central Florida in the United States
  - Lake Manatee, a lake in Manatee County, Florida, in the United States
  - Little Manatee River, a river in Hillsborough County and Manatee County, Florida, in the United States
  - Manatee River, a river in Manatee County, Florida, in the United States
  - Port Manatee, a seaport in Manatee County, Florida, in the United States
- Manatee Road, an unincorporated census-designated place in Levy County, Florida
- Manatee Springs State Park, a Florida State Park in Levy County, Florida, in the United States

== Other ==
- USS Manatee, the name of more than one United States Navy ship
- Manatee Palms Youth Services, a psychiatric hospital in Bradenton, Florida
- Manatee High School, a public high school in Bradenton, Florida
- Manatee, a database management system for effective indexing of large text corpora
