= Williston High School (Florida) =

Coordinates: 29.3855256°N 82.4517707°W

Williston Middle High School

Location
- 350 Robert Philpot Way; Williston, Florida; Levy County; Williston, Florida 32696; United States

Information
- School type: Public high school Title I
- Established: 1953
- School district: Levy County Public Schools
- Dean: James Smith & Benjamin Hawkins
- Principal: Joshua Slemp
- Staff: 52.67 (FTE)
- Grades: 6-12
- Age range: 11-18
- Student to teacher ratio: 21.38
- Hours in school day: Approx. 7 hours
- Campus: rural
- Colors: Red and White
- Fight song: Go Devils
- Mascot: Red Devil
- Team name: Red Devils
- National ranking: 340
- Website: Official website

Williston Middle High School is a public high school in Williston, Florida. It is a part of the School Board of Levy County, and serves students grades 6–12. Its school population currently is 1100 for the 2019–2020 school year. This school is currently the most populous high school in Levy County, Florida.

Its school mascot is the "Red Devils" and school colors are red and white.

== Notable alumni ==
- Quinyon Mitchell, football player
- Mike Payne, former baseball player, Atlanta Braves
- Esix Snead, former baseball player, New York Mets
- Ricky Vanasco, professional baseball player
- Darius Days, professional basketball player
