= Manatee River (disambiguation) =

There are several rivers named Manatee River

== Belize ==
- Manatee River (Belize)

== United States ==
- Manatee River (Florida)

== See also ==
- Manatee (disambiguation)
