= East Bronson, Florida =

- Census-designated place
- Location in Levy County and the state of Florida
- Coordinates: 29°27′33″N 82°35′26″W
- Country: United States
- State: Florida
- County: Levy

Area
  - Total: 11.44 sq mi (29.63 km^{2})
  - Land: 11.44 sq mi (29.63 km^{2})
  - Water: 0 sq mi (0.00 km^{2})
- Elevation: 66 ft (20 m)

Population (2020)
  - Total: 2,025
  - Density: 177.0/sq mi (68.34/km^{2})
- Time zone: UTC-5 (Eastern (EST))
  - Summer (DST): UTC-4 (EDT)
- FIPS code: 12-19025
- GNIS feature ID: 2402423

East Bronson is a census-designated place (CDP) in Levy County, Florida, United States. The population was 2,025 at the 2020 census, up from 1,945 at the 2010 census. It is part of the Gainesville, Florida Metropolitan Statistical Area.

== Geography ==
According to the United States Census Bureau, the CDP has a total area of 11.4 square miles (29.6 km^{2}), all land.

== Demographics ==
Historical population
Census	Pop.	Note	%±
2000	1,075		—
2010	1,945		80.9%
2020	2,025		4.1%
U.S. Decennial Census

=== 2020 census ===
As of the 2020 census, East Bronson had a population of 2,025. The median age was 40.4 years. 24.6% of residents were under the age of 18 and 19.8% of residents were 65 years of age or older. For every 100 females there were 106.2 males, and for every 100 females age 18 and over there were 104.1 males age 18 and over.

0.0% of residents lived in urban areas, while 100.0% lived in rural areas.

There were 776 households in East Bronson, of which 31.3% had children under the age of 18 living in them. Of all households, 44.7% were married-couple households, 21.9% were households with a male householder and no spouse or partner present, and 22.6% were households with a female householder and no spouse or partner present. About 28.8% of all households were made up of individuals and 15.0% had someone living alone who was 65 years of age or older.

There were 867 housing units, of which 10.5% were vacant. The homeowner vacancy rate was 0.9% and the rental vacancy rate was 7.5%.

Racial composition as of the 2020 census
Race	Number	Percent
White	1,534	75.8%
Black or African American	135	6.7%
American Indian and Alaska Native	17	0.8%
Asian	5	0.2%
Native Hawaiian and Other Pacific Islander	2	0.1%
Some other race	108	5.3%
Two or more races	224	11.1%
Hispanic or Latino (of any race)	336	16.6%

=== 2000 census ===
As of the census of 2000, there were 1,075 people, 394 households, and 293 families residing in the CDP. The population density was 93.8 inhabitants per square mile (36.2/km^{2}). There were 456 housing units at an average density of 39.8 per square mile (15.4/km^{2}). The racial makeup of the CDP was 86.23% White, 5.77% African American, 0.56% Native American, 0.28% Asian, 4.28% from other races, and 2.88% from two or more races. Hispanic or Latino of any race were 11.16% of the population.

There were 394 households, out of which 37.3% had children under the age of 18 living with them, 54.8% were married couples living together, 13.7% had a female householder with no husband present, and 25.6% were non-families. 21.6% of all households were made up of individuals, and 10.2% had someone living alone who was 65 years of age or older. The average household size was 2.73 and the average family size was 3.14.

In the CDP, the population was spread out, with 29.2% under the age of 18, 6.2% from 18 to 24, 29.9% from 25 to 44, 21.3% from 45 to 64, and 13.4% who were 65 years of age or older. The median age was 35 years. For every 100 females, there were 93.0 males. For every 100 females age 18 and over, there were 92.7 males.

The median income for a household in the CDP was $25,833, and the median income for a family was $26,853. Males had a median income of $21,691 versus $18,194 for females. The per capita income for the CDP was $12,611. About 8.6% of families and 15.2% of the population were below the poverty line, including 21.5% of those under age 18 and 11.7% of those age 65 or over.
