= Bronson Speedway =

Racetrack in Levy County, Florida

The Bronson Speedway
Florida's Premier High-Banked Short Track
- Location: Bronson, Florida
- Coordinates: 29°28′24″N 82°36′24″W
- Owner: Ann Young
- Operator: Ann Young
- Address: 9950 NE SR 24, Archer, FL, 32618
- Broke ground: 1973
- Opened: 1974
- Former names: Bronson Motor Speedway
- Major events: 4-cyl, Strictly Stock, Pure Stock, Street Stock, Sportsman, Open Wheel Modified, Drift Racing, Pro Challenge Series, Legends, Figure 8, Pro Figure 8

Oval with infield cross
- Surface: Asphalt
- Turns: 4
- Banking: 18 degrees
- Race lap record: 12.8 (Gene Owen, Owen Farms, 1987, Super-Late Model)

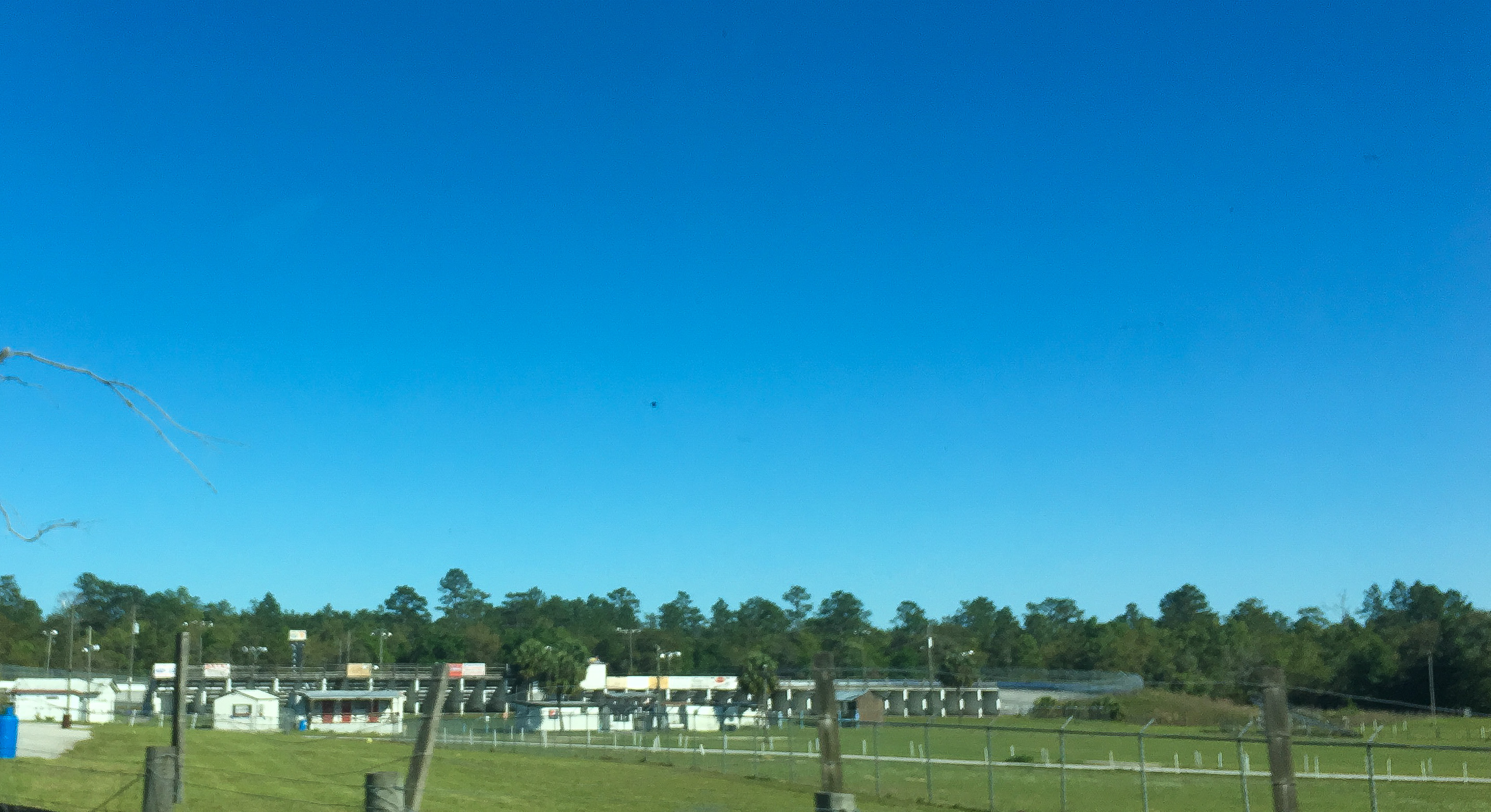
Bronson Speedway, April 2019

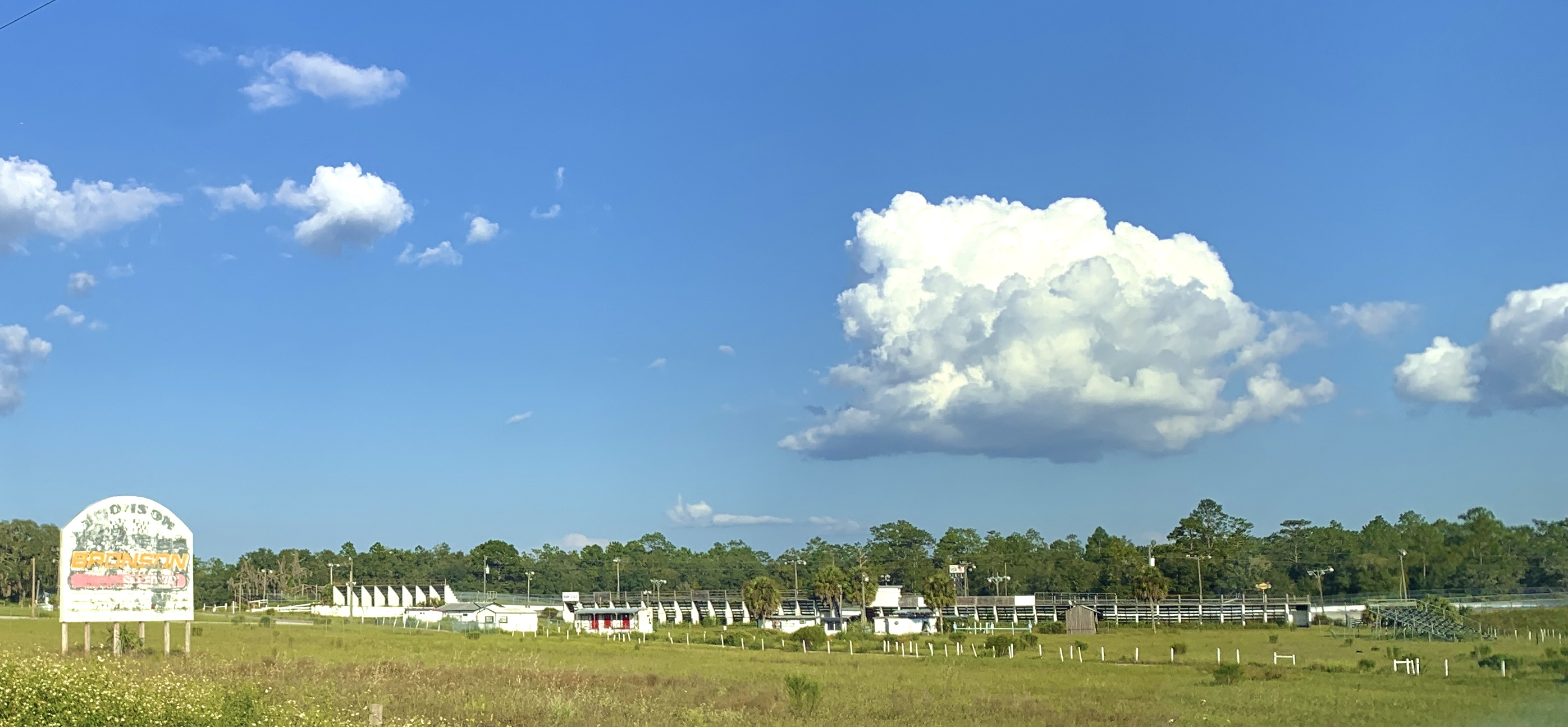
Bronson Speedway, September 2022

The Bronson Speedway is an asphalt, 3/8 mile racetrack in Levy County, Florida, United States. It hosted several local racing series as well as a number of touring series throughout the years. Proud to claim to be the home track of "The Best Drivers in the South" Bronson generally ran events on every other weekend through the race season which stretched from January/February through August. Local race series included: 4-cylinders, a "Strictly Stock" class, "Pure Stock" class, "Street Stock" class, "Sportsman" class, "Open-Wheel Modifieds," and Drift Racing. Touring series which frequented the facility included the "Pro-Challenge Series" as well as the Florida United Promoters Series (including Sportsman, Pro-Truck, and Legends divisions) and the Daytona Antique Auto Racing Association (DAARA).

Originally constructed in the mid-1970s in an attempt to bring a different, northern feel to Southern motorsports (as opposed to the dirt tracks which typify the region), the track changed hands a number of times before being purchased by Chris and Ann Young in 2011. Attempting to bring a "family feel" into the local racing scene, the Youngs have emphasized a reduction of overhead costs and ticket prices in an effort to encourage local families to "return to the speedway" for their Saturday night entertainment. Featured in numerous local publications as well as in The New York Times the Bronson Speedway has developed a reputation for a unique and innovative approach to the racing industry including an emphasis on the integration of social media within traditional track promotions efforts.

The Youngs used a process of diversifying the use of the track, working to provide local drivers and drifters with a track to call home as well as to reopen a mudbog which fell into disuse during the frequent ownership changes of the past. In the fall of 2013, Bronson Speedway became one of the first short-tracks to enter into partnership with Humpy Wheeler's Speedway Benefits group, a marketing and advertising association of more than 1,000 international short-track owners and venues seeking to gain greater negotiating authority via collective bargaining with potential suppliers and sponsors.

When in operation, Bronson Speedway typically ran events on an every other weekend schedule with special events advertised well in advance.
