= Mike Payne (baseball) =

American baseball player (1961-2002)

- Pitcher
- Born: November 15, 1961; Woonsocket, Rhode Island, U.S.
- Died: August 4, 2002 (aged 40); Dunnellon, Florida, U.S.
- Batted: Right Threw: Right

MLB debut
- August 22, 1984, for the Atlanta Braves

Last MLB appearance
- September 17, 1984, for the Atlanta Braves

MLB statistics
- Win–loss record: 0–1
- Earned run average: 6.35
- Strikeouts: 3
- Stats at Baseball Reference

Teams
- Atlanta Braves (1984)

Michael Earl Payne (November 15, 1961 – August 4, 2002) was an American Major League Baseball (MLB) pitcher. In 1979, he was drafted by the Atlanta Braves in the sixth round, and he played eight seasons in the Minor Leagues and one season in the Major Leagues with them.

== Career ==
=== Baseball ===
Payne attended Williston High School in Williston, FL, where he played baseball. He threw five no-hitters and had a 0.55 earned run average during his senior year. He set a Florida state record for most batters struck out in a single game.

In 1976, Payne entered a contest and won a trip to St. Louis to attend a three-game series of the Atlanta Braves. He also served as batboy for the Braves that weekend.

Payne was offered a baseball scholarship from University of Florida but declined the offer. In 1979, he was drafted by the Braves, and subsequently played eight seasons for various minor league affiliates of the Braves, during which time he pitched four shutout games. He played three major league games for the Braves in 1984. In 1987, he played one season for a minor league affiliate of the Montreal Expos. Due to an arm injury, he retired from the MLB.

=== Later life ===
In 1986, Payne moved back to Williston where he co-owned an auto shop with his father. Later, he worked as assistant coach at Williston High, serving under Paul Runge, a former teammate for the Braves. In the mid-1990s he took a job as the head coach at Dunnellon High School in Dunnellon, FL. In 2000, the Dunnellon Tigers won 26 games, which set a new school record, and Payne was named Class 3A coach of the year. In 2001, the Tigers won the district championship.

== Personal life ==
Payne had 4 children with his wife Carla. One of his sons, Mike Jr., also played high school and college baseball and as of 2022 is head coach at Dunnellon High.

== Death and legacy ==
In 2001, Payne contracted Eastern equine encephalitis after being bitten by a mosquito while working in his yard. He was hospitalized on August 5. On August 18, Dunnellon High principal Bobby James told the Tampa Bay Times that Payne was "still in a coma and in critical condition." Payne later regained consciousness but lost the ability to walk and speak. He died on August 4, 2002 due to complications from the disease.

Payne acquired a reputation for being a hard worker and a good coach, and he is remembered fondly both in Dunnellon and the surrounding area. Joe Buccheri, a former instructor for the St. Louis Cardinals and a friend of Payne's, said "There wasn't anything to dislike about him. It wasn't hard to form an attachment. Mike was just a great, great guy." Brent Hall, coach at Crystal River High School, said "He was great. I think he was just the epitome of the small-town coach. He had those kids playing very hard for him all the time. And he was very dedicated and committed to the town of Dunnellon and its young people."

Following Payne's death, the baseball field at Dunnellon High School was renamed Mike Payne Field. The area's preseason classic was also posthumously named after Payne.
