= East Williston, Florida =

- Census-designated place
- Location in Levy County and the state of Florida
- Coordinates: 29°22′35″N 82°24′42″W
- Country: United States
- State: Florida
- County: Levy

Area
  - Total: 3.01 sq mi (7.79 km^{2})
  - Land: 3.01 sq mi (7.79 km^{2})
  - Water: 0 sq mi (0.00 km^{2})
- Elevation: 79 ft (24 m)

Population (2020)
  - Total: 780
  - Density: 259.2/sq mi (100.08/km^{2})
- Time zone: UTC-5 (Eastern (EST))
  - Summer (DST): UTC-4 (EDT)
- ZIP code: 32696
- Area code: 352
- FIPS code: 12-19575
- GNIS feature ID: 2402437

East Williston is a census-designated place (CDP) in Levy County, Florida, United States. The population was 780 at the 2020 census, up from 694 at the 2010 census. It is part of the Gainesville, Florida Metropolitan Statistical Area.

== Geography ==
According to the United States Census Bureau, the CDP has a total area of 3.0 square miles (7.8 km^{2}), all land.

== Demographics ==
Historical population
| Census | Pop. | Note | %± |
|---|---|---|---|
| 2000 | 966 | | — |
| 2010 | 694 | | −28.2% |
| 2020 | 780 | | 12.4% |
U.S. Decennial Census

=== 2020 census ===
East Williston CDP, Florida – Racial and ethnic composition Note: the US Census treats Hispanic/Latino as an ethnic category. This table excludes Latinos from the racial categories and assigns them to a separate category. Hispanics/Latinos may be of any race.
| Race / Ethnicity (NH = Non-Hispanic) | Pop 2000 | Pop 2010 | Pop 2020 | % 2000 | % 2010 | % 2020 |
|---|---|---|---|---|---|---|
| White alone (NH) | 114 | 102 | 177 | 11.80% | 14.70% | 22.69% |
| Black or African American alone (NH) | 805 | 554 | 557 | 83.33% | 79.83% | 71.41% |
| Native American or Alaska Native alone (NH) | 1 | 0 | 0 | 0.10% | 0.00% | 0.00% |
| Asian alone (NH) | 0 | 0 | 0 | 0.00% | 0.00% | 0.00% |
| Native Hawaiian or Pacific Islander alone (NH) | 0 | 0 | 0 | 0.00% | 0.00% | 0.00% |
| Other race (NH) | 0 | 0 | 3 | 0.00% | 0.00% | 0.38% |
| Mixed race or Multiracial (NH) | 23 | 6 | 9 | 2.38% | 0.86% | 1.15% |
| Hispanic or Latino (any race) | 23 | 32 | 34 | 2.38% | 4.61% | 4.36% |
| Total | 966 | 694 | 780 | 100.00% | 100.00% | 100.00% |

As of the census of 2000, there were 966 people, 344 households, and 245 families residing in the CDP. The population density was 310.6 inhabitants per square mile (119.9/km^{2}). There were 381 housing units at an average density of 122.5 per square mile (47.3/km^{2}). The racial makeup of the CDP was 12.42% White, 83.75% African American, 0.21% Native American, 1.14% from other races, and 2.48% from two or more races. Hispanic or Latino of any race were 2.38% of the population.

There were 344 households, out of which 35.5% had children under the age of 18 living with them, 29.1% were married couples living together, 36.3% had a female householder with no husband present, and 28.5% were non-families. 23.5% of all households were made up of individuals, and 8.7% had someone living alone who was 65 years of age or older. The average household size was 2.81 and the average family size was 3.32.

In the CDP, the population was spread out, with 31.2% under the age of 18, 12.1% from 18 to 24, 27.6% from 25 to 44, 17.6% from 45 to 64, and 11.5% who were 65 years of age or older. The median age was 31 years. For every 100 females, there were 75.6 males. For every 100 females age 18 and over, there were 75.5 males.

The median income for a household in the CDP was $23,882, and the median income for a family was $28,152. Males had a median income of $26,589 versus $17,981 for females. The per capita income for the CDP was $14,085. About 29.4% of families and 28.7% of the population were below the poverty line, including 41.7% of those under age 18 and 35.1% of those age 65 or over.
