= Raleigh, Florida =

- Census-designated place
- Location within Florida Location within the United States
- Coordinates: 29°26′52″N 82°28′05″W
- Country: United States
- State: Florida
- County: Levy

Area
  - Total: 1.94 sq mi (5.03 km^{2})
  - Land: 1.94 sq mi (5.03 km^{2})
  - Water: 0 sq mi (0.00 km^{2})
- Elevation: 69 ft (21 m)

Population (2020)
  - Total: 357
  - Density: 183.7/sq mi (70.94/km^{2})
- Time zone: UTC-5 (Eastern (EST))
  - Summer (DST): UTC-4 (EDT)
- ZIP code: 32696
- Area code: 352
- FIPS code: 12-59475
- GNIS feature ID: 2628531

Raleigh is a census-designated place (CDP) in Levy County, Florida, United States. The population was 357 at the 2020 census, down from 373 at the 2010 census. It is part of the Gainesville, Florida Metropolitan Statistical Area.

== Geography ==
Raleigh is located in northeastern Levy County, at the intersection of U.S. routes 27 and 41 with County Road 335, 4 miles (6 km) north of Williston and 7 miles (11 km) south of Archer.

According to the United States Census Bureau, the CDP has a total area of 1.9 square miles (5.0 km^{2}), all land.

== Demographics ==
Historical population
Census	Pop.	Note	%±
2010	373		—
2020	357		−4.3%
U.S. Decennial Census; 1990 2000

Raleigh was first listed as a census designated place in the 2010 U.S. census.

=== 2020 census ===
Raleigh CDP, Florida – Racial and ethnic composition Note: the US Census treats Hispanic/Latino as an ethnic category. This table excludes Latinos from the racial categories and assigns them to a separate category. Hispanics/Latinos may be of any race.
Race / Ethnicity (NH = Non-Hispanic)	Pop 2010	Pop 2020	% 2010	% 2020
White alone (NH)	152	126	40.75%	35.29%
Black or African American alone (NH)	206	192	55.23%	53.78%
Native American or Alaska Native alone (NH)	1	0	0.27%	0.00%
Asian alone (NH)	1	0	0.27%	0.00%
Pacific Islander alone (NH)	0	0	0.00%	0.00%
Some Other Race alone (NH)	0	0	0.00%	0.00%
Mixed Race/Multi-Racial (NH)	3	19	0.80%	5.32%
Hispanic or Latino (any race)	10	20	2.68%	5.60%
Total	373	357	100.00%	100.00%
