= Levy County Courthouse =

Courthouse in Florida

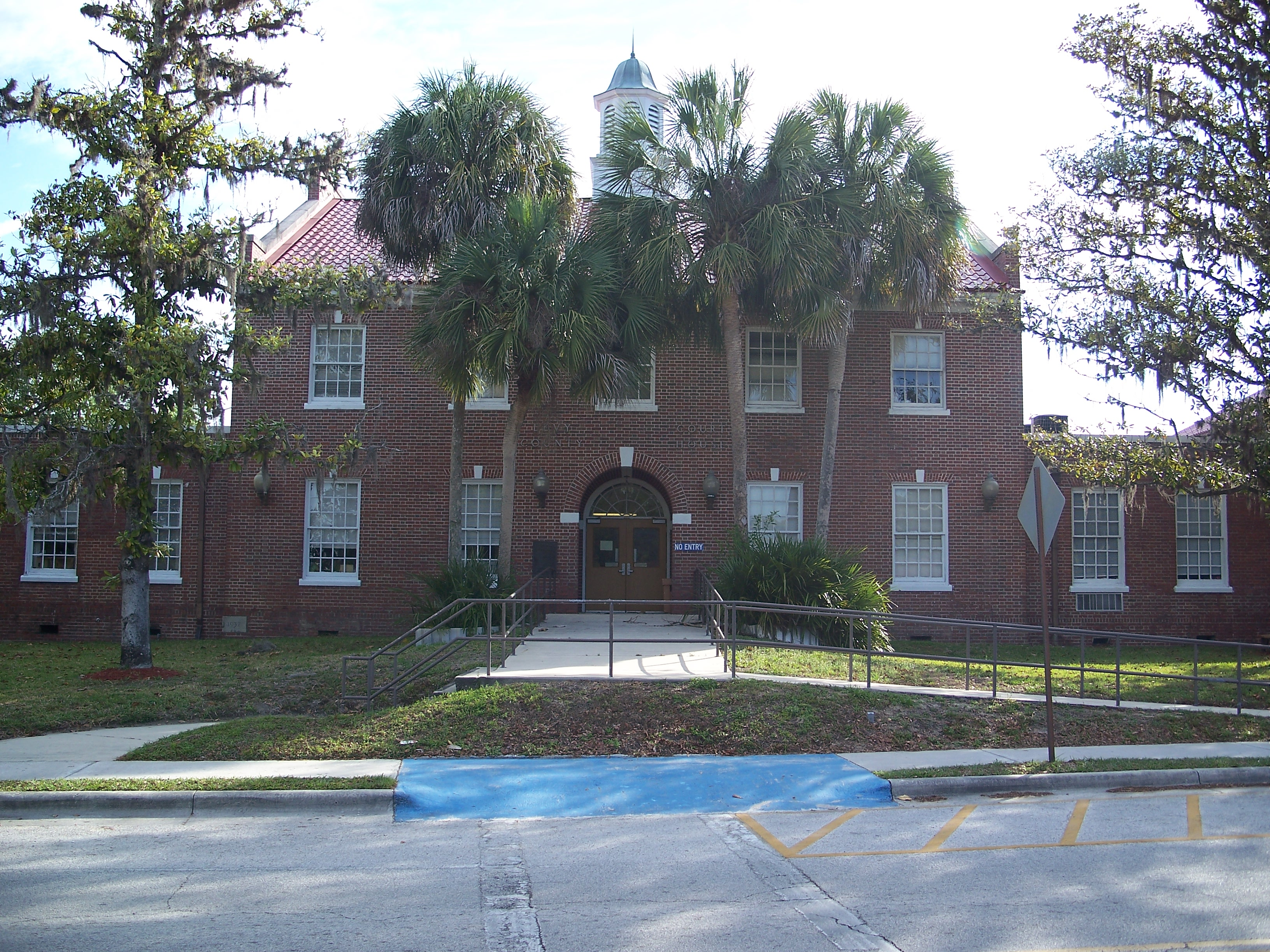
- Levy County Courthouse
- Interactive map of the Levy County Courthouse area

General information
- Architectural style: Classical Revival
- Location: Bronson, Florida, United States
- Coordinates: 29°27′24″N 82°38′22″W
- Completed: 1937
- Cost: $
- Client: Levy County

Design and construction
- Architects: Henry L. Taylor, AIA
- Engineer: Builder: O. R. Woodcock

The Levy County Courthouse, built in 1937, is a historic redbrick Classical Revival style courthouse building located in Bronson, Florida. It was designed by architect Henry L. Taylor and built by O. R. Woodcock. It is Levy County's fourth purpose-built courthouse and the third one built in Bronson. Some material salvaged from the previous (1906) courthouse were used in its construction. An annex has been added to it.

In 1989, the Levy County Courthouse was listed in A Guide to Florida's Historic Architecture, published by the University of Florida Press.
