= Williston Highlands, Florida =

- Census-designated place
- Location in Levy County and the state of Florida
- Coordinates: 29°20′01″N 82°32′08″W
- Country: United States
- State: Florida
- County: Levy

Area
  - Total: 11.32 sq mi (29.31 km^{2})
  - Land: 11.32 sq mi (29.31 km^{2})
  - Water: 0 sq mi (0.00 km^{2})
- Elevation: 105 ft (32 m)

Population (2020)
  - Total: 2,591
  - Density: 228.9/sq mi (88.39/km^{2})
- Time zone: UTC-5 (Eastern (EST))
  - Summer (DST): UTC-4 (EDT)
- FIPS code: 12-77837
- GNIS feature ID: 2403031

Williston Highlands is a census-designated place (CDP) in Levy County, Florida, United States. The population was 2,591 at the 2020 census, up from 2,275 at the 2010 census. It is part of the Gainesville, Florida Metropolitan Statistical Area.

== Geography ==
According to the United States Census Bureau, the CDP has a total area of 11.3 square miles (29.3 km^{2}), all land.

== Demographics ==
Historical population
Census	Pop.	Note	%±
2000	1,386		—
2010	2,275		64.1%
2020	2,591		13.9%
U.S. Decennial Census

=== 2020 census ===
As of the 2020 census, Williston Highlands had a population of 2,591.

The median age was 49.1 years. 21.5% of residents were under the age of 18 and 24.9% of residents were 65 years of age or older. For every 100 females there were 98.5 males, and for every 100 females age 18 and over there were 96.8 males age 18 and over.

0.0% of residents lived in urban areas, while 100.0% lived in rural areas.

There were 1,057 households in Williston Highlands, of which 27.2% had children under the age of 18 living in them. Of all households, 49.4% were married-couple households, 16.7% were households with a male householder and no spouse or partner present, and 24.7% were households with a female householder and no spouse or partner present. About 22.2% of all households were made up of individuals and 11.0% had someone living alone who was 65 years of age or older.

There were 1,161 housing units, of which 9.0% were vacant. The homeowner vacancy rate was 1.3% and the rental vacancy rate was 0.0%.

Racial composition as of the 2020 census
Race	Number	Percent
White	2,137	82.5%
Black or African American	130	5.0%
American Indian and Alaska Native	16	0.6%
Asian	6	0.2%
Native Hawaiian and Other Pacific Islander	3	0.1%
Some other race	100	3.9%
Two or more races	199	7.7%
Hispanic or Latino (of any race)	264	10.2%

=== 2000 census ===
As of the census of 2000, there were 1,386 people, 600 households, and 414 families residing in the CDP. The population density was 123.3 inhabitants per square mile (47.6/km^{2}). There were 691 housing units at an average density of 61.5 per square mile (23.7/km^{2}). The racial makeup of the CDP was 94.16% White, 3.68% African American, 0.58% Native American, 0.14% Asian, 0.22% Pacific Islander, 0.29% from other races, and 0.94% from two or more races. Hispanic or Latino of any race were 3.90% of the population.

There were 600 households, out of which 20.3% had children under the age of 18 living with them, 57.2% were married couples living together, 7.8% had a female householder with no husband present, and 31.0% were non-families. 25.7% of all households were made up of individuals, and 13.7% had someone living alone who was 65 years of age or older. The average household size was 2.31 and the average family size was 2.71.

In the CDP, the population was spread out, with 20.0% under the age of 18, 5.3% from 18 to 24, 22.7% from 25 to 44, 26.7% from 45 to 64, and 25.3% who were 65 years of age or older. The median age was 46 years. For every 100 females, there were 97.4 males. For every 100 females age 18 and over, there were 95.6 males.

The median income for a household in the CDP was $23,607, and the median income for a family was $26,941. Males had a median income of $29,648 versus $22,000 for females. The per capita income for the CDP was $14,365. About 19.9% of families and 21.1% of the population were below the poverty line, including 31.1% of those under age 18 and 14.1% of those age over 64.
