= School Board of Levy County =

School district in Florida, United States

District School Board of Levy County or the School Board of Levy County (SBLC) is a school district headquartered in Bronson, Florida. It serves Levy County.

== Schools ==
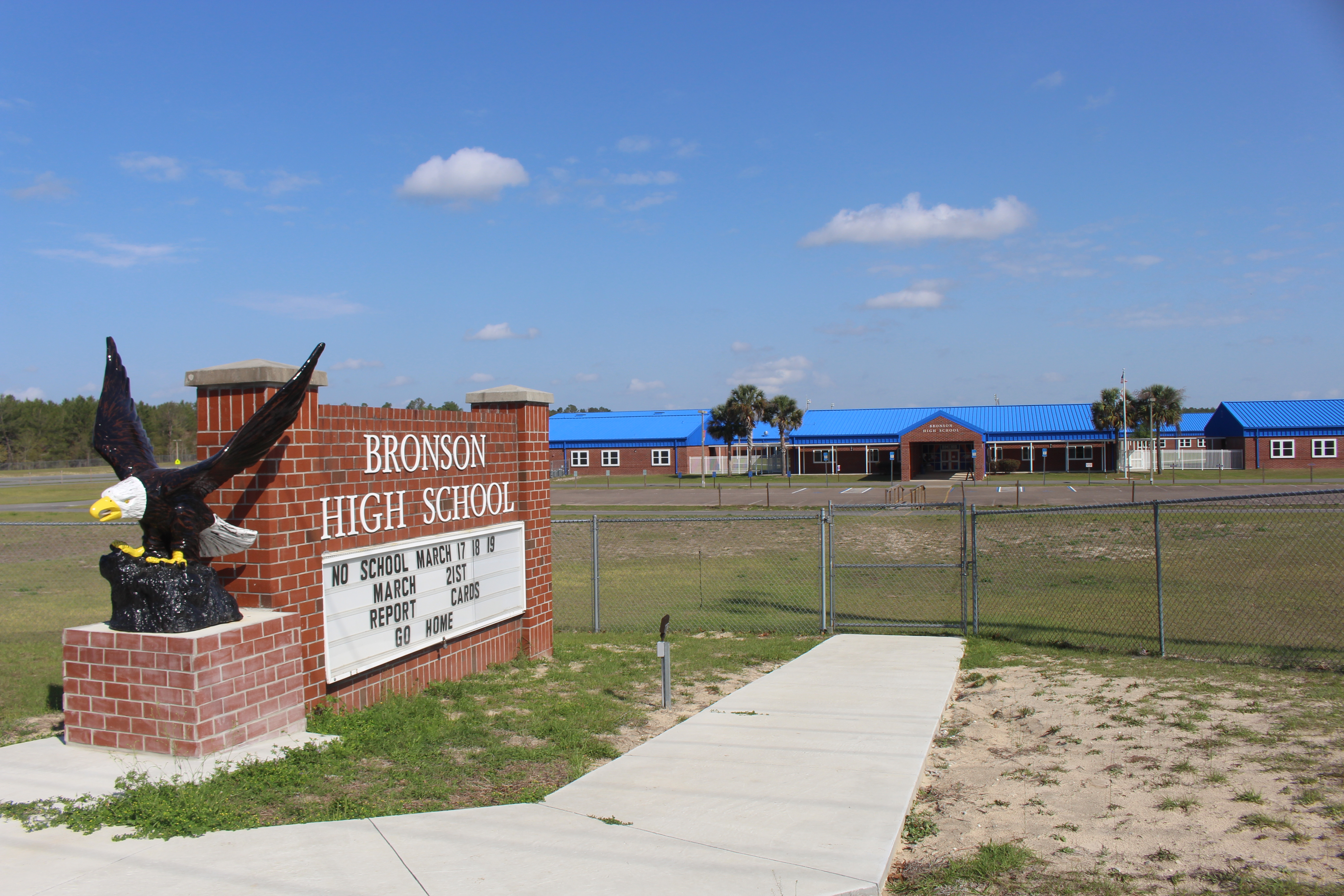
Bronson High School

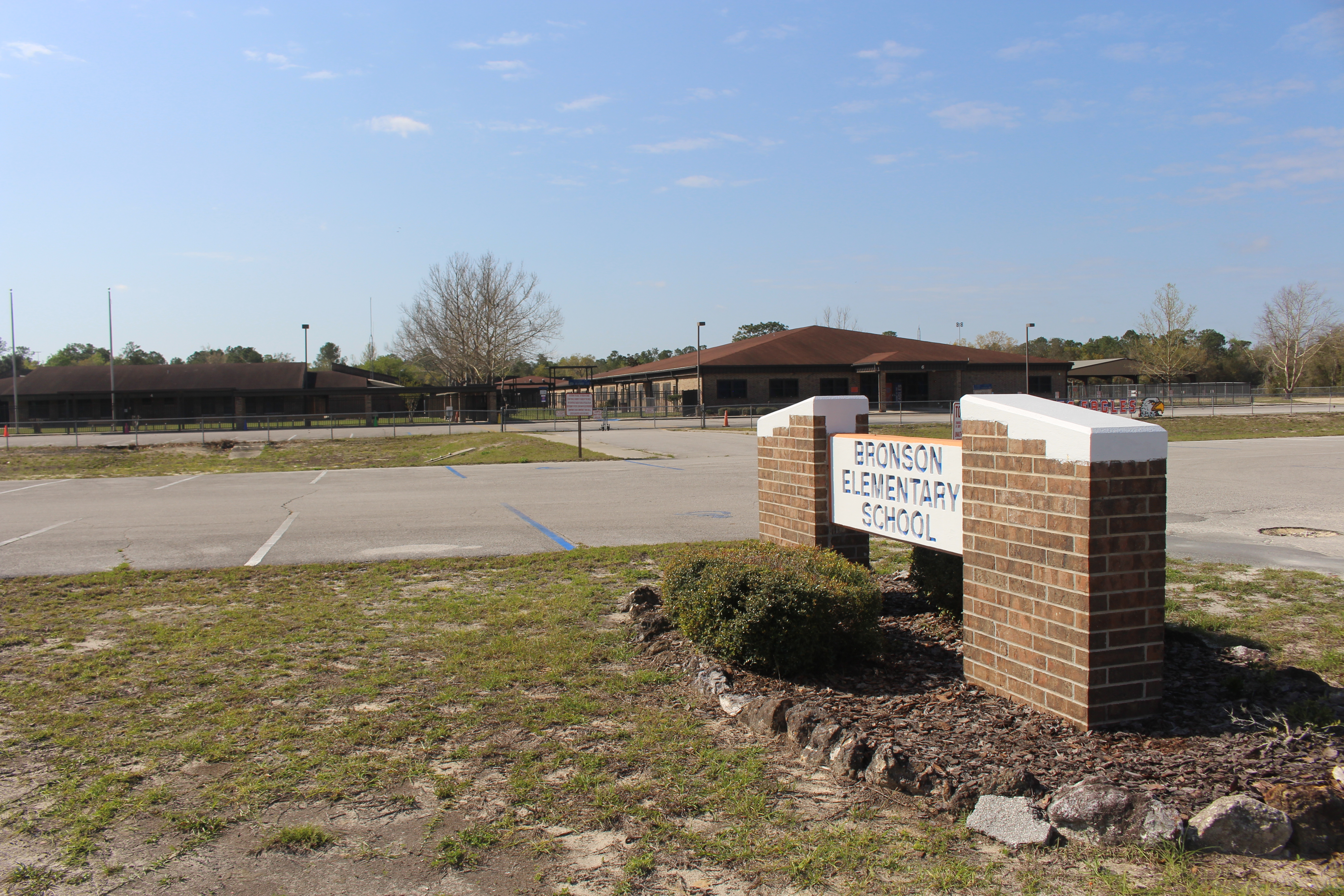
Bronson Elementary School

K-12:

- Cedar Key School

6-12:

- Bronson Middle High School
- Chiefland Middle High School
- Williston Middle High School

PK-8:

- Yankeetown School
- Whispering Winds Charter School (Chiefland)

6-8:

- Nature Coast Middle School (Chiefland)

PK-5:

- Bronson Elementary School
- Chiefland Elementary School

3-5:

- Williston Elementary School

PK-2:

- Joyce M. Bullock Elementary School (Williston)
