= Florida State Road 320 =

State highway in Florida, United States

State Road 320
- SR 320 in red, CR 320 in blue

Route information
- Maintained by FDOT
- Length: 5.784 mi (9.308 km)

Major junctions
- West end: Manatee Springs State Park
- East end: US 19 / US 27 Alt. / US 98 in Chiefland

Location
- Country: United States
- State: Florida
- Counties: Levy

Highway system
- Florida State Highway System; Interstate; US; State; Former; Pre‑1945; Toll; Scenic
← US 319	→ SR 321

State Road 320 (SR 320) is an east–west route in Levy County connecting Manatee Springs State Park to U.S. Route 19 (US 19), 98, and US 27 Alternate (US 27 Alt.).

The state-signed portion runs along streets named Manatee Springs Road, Northwest 115th Street, and Northwest 19th Avenue. The road continues east of US 19/98/27 Alt. as County Road 320 along Northeast 120th Street from its intersection with US 19/98/27 Alt. to CR 339 in Newton.

== Major intersections ==
The entire route is in Levy County.

Location	mi	km	Destinations	Notes
	0.000	0.000	Manatee Springs State Park	
Chiefland	5.516	8.877	CR 341 (Northwest 14th Street)	
Chiefland	5.784	9.308	US 19 / US 27 Alt. / US 98 (SR 55)	
1.000 mi = 1.609 km; 1.000 km = 0.621 mi
