= Inglis, Florida =

Town in Florida, United States

- Town
- Town of Inglis
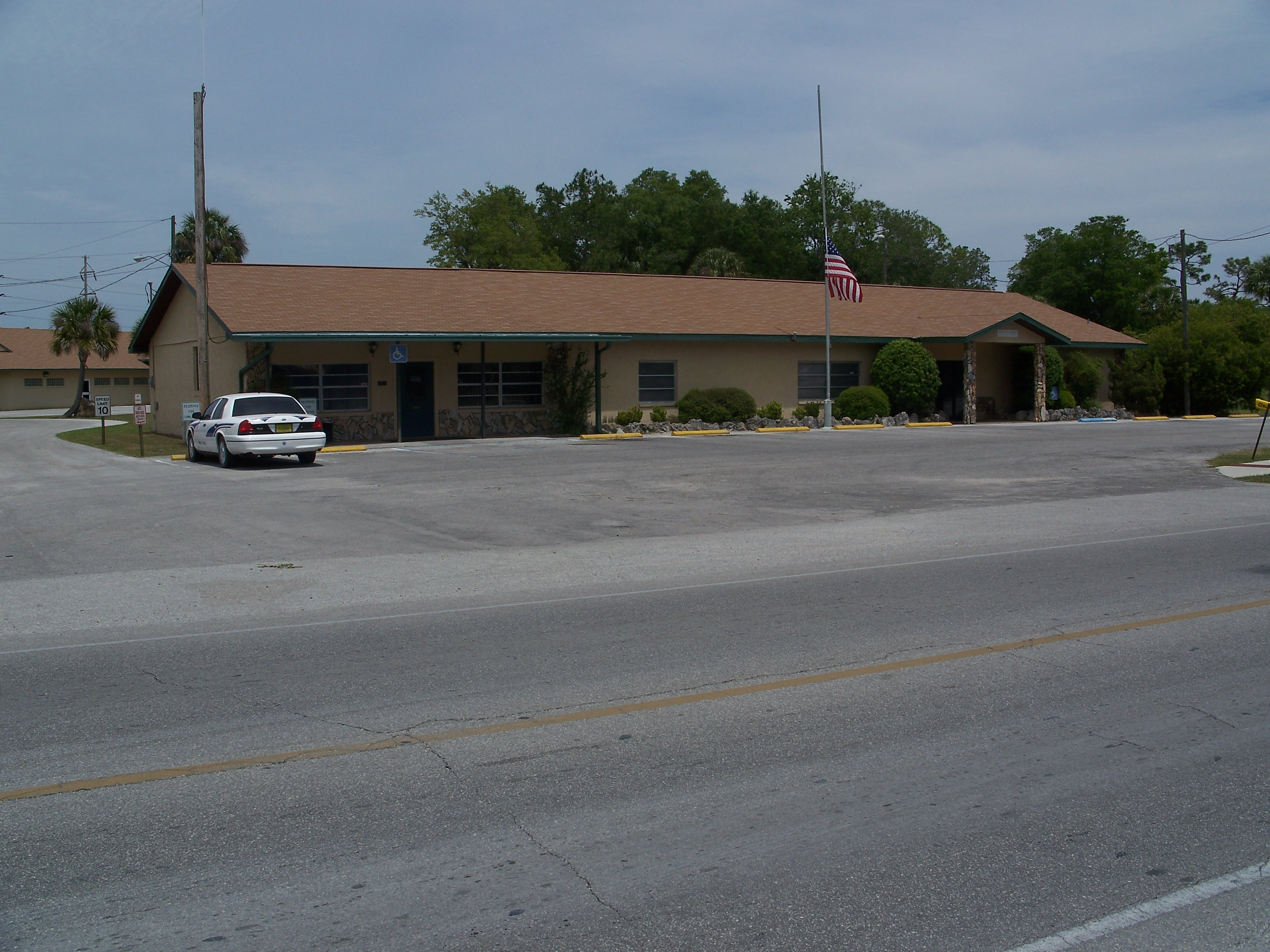
- Inglis Town Hall

- Logo

- Location in Levy County and the state of Florida
- Coordinates: 29°01′56″N 82°39′37″W
- Country: United States
- State: Florida
- County: Levy
- Settled (Blind Horse–Port Inglis): 1875
- Incorporated (Town of Inglis): 1956

Government
  - Type: Mayor–Commission
  - Mayor: Isaac Young
  - Commission President: Harry Brodhead
  - Commissioners: Lonnie Parnell, Daryl Lynaugh, and Mike Ahern
  - City Clerk: Cery Logeman
  - City Attorney: Christopher Anderson

Area
  - Total: 3.43 sq mi (8.89 km^{2})
  - Land: 3.41 sq mi (8.84 km^{2})
  - Water: 0.015 sq mi (0.04 km^{2})
- Elevation: 16 ft (4.9 m)

Population (2020)
  - Total: 1,476
  - Density: 432.3/sq mi (166.91/km^{2})
- Time zone: UTC-5 (Eastern (EST))
  - Summer (DST): UTC-4 (EDT)
- ZIP code: 34449
- Area code: 352
- FIPS code: 12-33800
- GNIS feature ID: 2405888
- Website: townofinglis.org

Inglis is a town in Levy County, Florida, United States. It is on U.S. Highway 19 near the Cross Florida Greenway. As of the 2020 census, the town had a population of 1,476, up from 1,325 at the 2010 census. It is part of the Gainesville, Florida Metropolitan Statistical Area.

== History ==
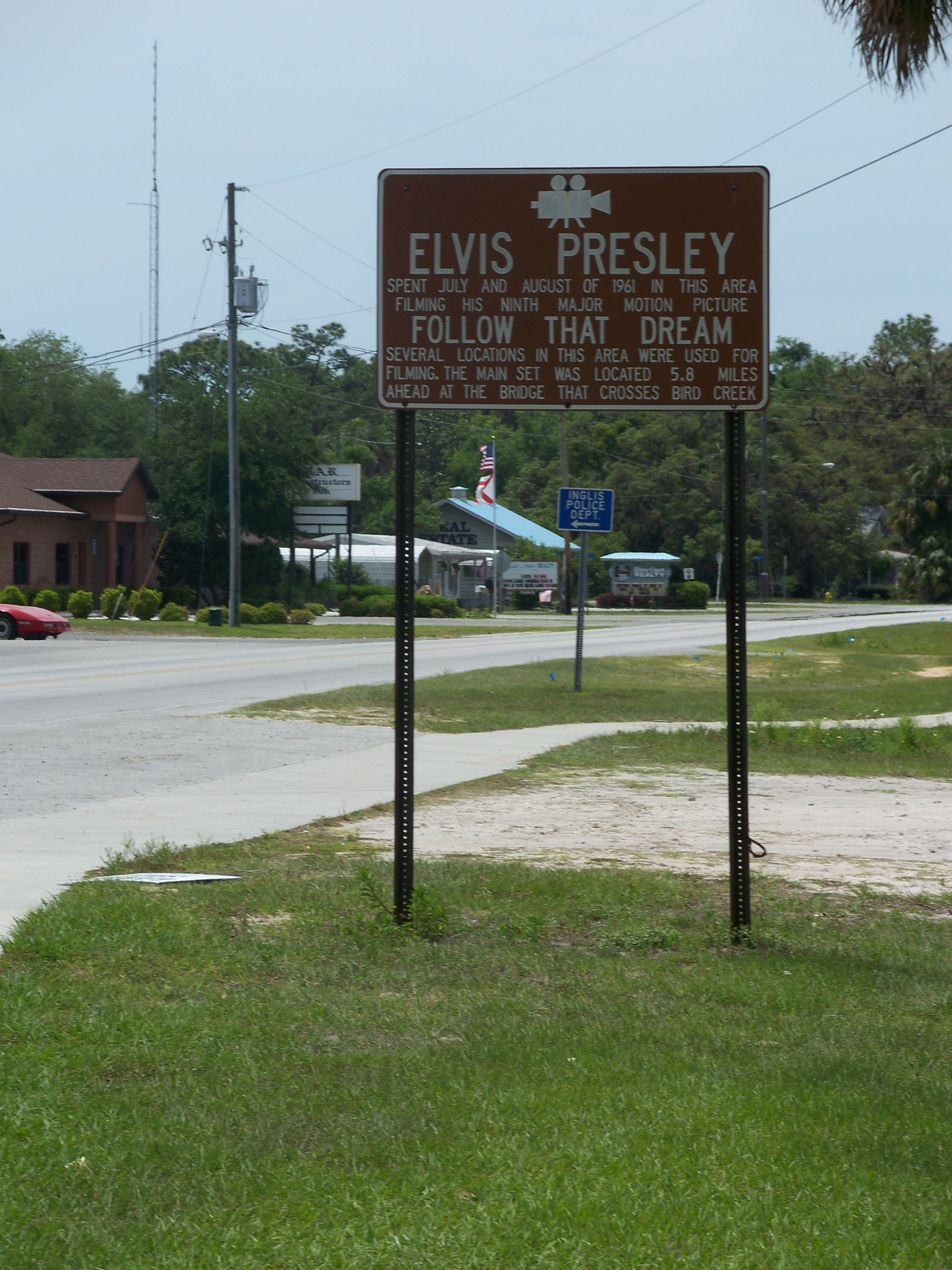
Sign along CR 40 memorializing the filming of the 1962 Elvis Presley movie "Follow That Dream" along the road in Inglis

The town is named after Captain John L. Inglis, a Scottish American with family from Glasgow, Scotland, who skippered a boat from Spain to the mouth of the Withlacoochee River for trading purposes, and was connected with Dunnellon Phosphate. The community was originally called “Blind Horse” (thought to either be named for a blind horse that once pulled ferries or a blind horse that fell off a ferry), but was renamed “Port Inglis” the same year, when it was first settled in 1875.

Despite being settled since 1875, the Town of Inglis was officially incorporated as a municipality in 1956.

=== Elvis Presley in Inglis ===
During July and August 1961, Elvis Presley spent his summer in Inglis and the surrounding areas filming his movie Follow That Dream. A historical marker on Follow That Dream Parkway in Inglis commemorates this event.

== Geography ==
The town lies approximately 5 miles (8 km) east of the Gulf of Mexico.

According to the United States Census Bureau, the town has a total area of 3.7 square miles (9.5 km^{2}), of which 3.6 square miles (9.4 km^{2}) is land and 0.015 square miles (0.04 km^{2}), or 0.40%, is water.

=== Climate ===
The climate in this area is characterized by hot, humid summers and generally mild winters. According to the Köppen climate classification, the Town of Inglis has a humid subtropical climate zone (Cfa).

== Demographics ==
Historical population
Census	Pop.	Note	%±
1960	250		—
1970	449		79.6%
1980	1,173		161.2%
1990	1,241		5.8%
2000	1,491		20.1%
2010	1,325		−11.1%
2020	1,476		11.4%
U.S. Decennial Census

=== Racial and ethnic composition ===
Inglis racial composition (Hispanics excluded from racial categories) (NH = Non-Hispanic)
Race	Pop 2010	Pop 2020	% 2010	% 2020
White (NH)	1,215	1,343	91.70%	90.99%
Black or African American (NH)	6	14	0.45%	0.95%
Native American or Alaska Native (NH)	4	7	0.30%	0.47%
Asian (NH)	17	8	1.28%	0.54%
Pacific Islander or Native Hawaiian (NH)	0	0	0.00%	0.00%
Some other race (NH)	1	4	0.08%	0.27%
Two or more races/Multiracial (NH)	20	50	1.51%	3.39%
Hispanic or Latino (any race)	62	50	4.68%	3.39%
Total	1,325	1,476	100.00%	100.00%

=== 2020 census ===
As of the 2020 census, Inglis had a population of 1,476. The median age was 57.1 years. 13.3% of residents were under the age of 18 and 32.0% of residents were 65 years of age or older. For every 100 females there were 100.3 males, and for every 100 females age 18 and over there were 98.0 males age 18 and over.

0.0% of residents lived in urban areas, while 100.0% lived in rural areas.

There were 693 households in Inglis, of which 16.0% had children under the age of 18 living in them. Of all households, 34.9% were married-couple households, 27.0% were households with a male householder and no spouse or partner present, and 30.4% were households with a female householder and no spouse or partner present. About 37.1% of all households were made up of individuals and 18.6% had someone living alone who was 65 years of age or older.

There were 854 housing units, of which 18.9% were vacant. The homeowner vacancy rate was 2.4% and the rental vacancy rate was 11.9%.

The 2020 American Community Survey 5-year estimates reported 456 families in the town.

=== 2010 census ===
As of the 2010 United States census, there were 1,325 people, 758 households, and 448 families residing in the town.

=== 2000 census ===
As of the census of 2000, there were 1,491 people in the town, organized into 670 households and 426 families. The population density was 408.2 inhabitants per square mile (157.6/km^{2}). There were 803 housing units at an average density of 219.8 per square mile (84.9/km^{2}). The racial makeup of the town was 98.73% White, 0.34% Asian, 0.13% Native American, 0.13% from other races, and 0.67% from two or more races. 1.88% of the population were Hispanic or Latino of any race.

In 2000, there were 670 households, out of which 22.2% had children under the age of 18 living with them, 49.0% were married couples living together; 8.2% had a female householder with no husband present; and 36.3% were non-families. 31.0% of all households were made up of individuals, and 15.2% had someone living alone who was 65 years of age or older. The average household size was 2.23 and the average family size was 2.70.

In 2000, in the town, the population was spread out, with 20.9% under the age of 18, 5.0% from 18 to 24, 22.3% from 25 to 44, 29.0% from 45 to 64, and 22.8% who were 65 years of age or older. The median age was 46 years. For every 100 females, there were 97.7 males. For every 100 females age 18 and over, there were 102.7 males.

In 2000, the median income for a household in the town was $24,432, and the median income for a family was $27,734. Males had a median income of $24,342 versus $20,278 for females. The per capita income for the town was $14,098. 22.3% of the population and 18.9% of families were below the poverty line. Out of the total population, 35.1% of those under the age of 18 and 9.6% of those 65 and older were living below the poverty line.

== See also ==
- Inglis quarry
