= Otter Creek, Florida =

Town in the state of Florida, United States

- Town
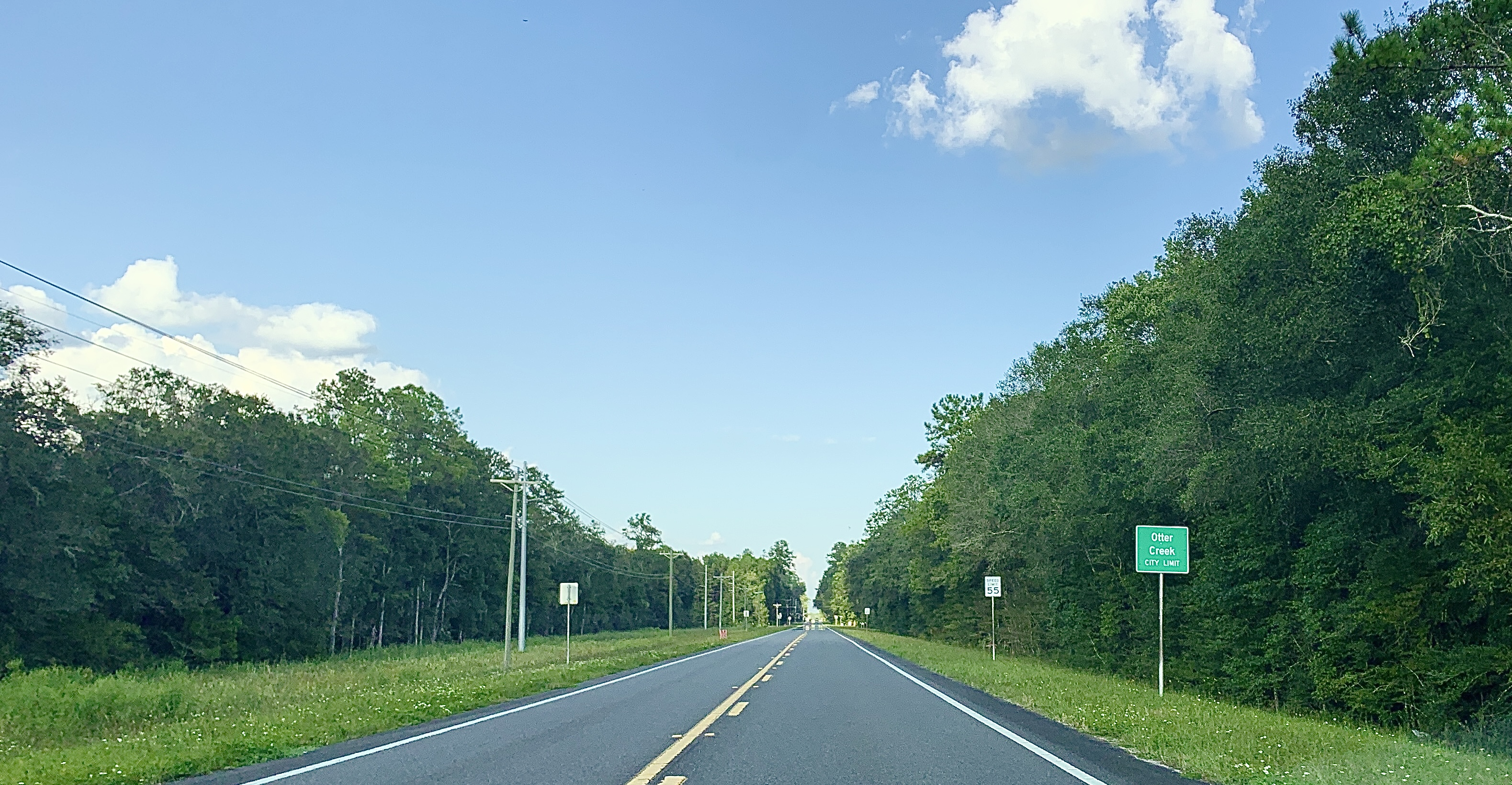
- Eastbound SR 24 entering Otter Creek.

- Emblem

- Location in Levy County and the state of Florida
- Coordinates: 29°19′26″N 82°46′24″W
- Country: United States
- State: Florida
- County: Levy
- Settled (Otter Creek Ford): 1856
- Incorporated (Town of Otter Creek): 1969

Government
  - Type: Mayor-Council
  - Mayor: Therese Granger
  - Vice Mayor: Zim Padgett
  - Councilmembers: Sonya Gail Lamb, Don Severino, and Russell Meeks Sr.
  - Town Clerk: Belinda Standridge
  - Town Attorney: Steven Warm

Area
  - Total: 1.38 sq mi (3.57 km^{2})
  - Land: 1.36 sq mi (3.52 km^{2})
  - Water: 0.019 sq mi (0.05 km^{2})
- Elevation: 30 ft (9.1 m)

Population (2020)
  - Total: 108
  - Density: 79.4/sq mi (30.64/km^{2})
- Time zone: UTC-5 (Eastern (EST))
  - Summer (DST): UTC-4 (EDT)
- ZIP code: 32683
- Area code: 352
- FIPS code: 12-53500
- GNIS feature ID: 2407059
- Website: townofottercreek.org

Otter Creek is a town in Levy County, North Florida, United States. The population was 108 at the 2020 census.

== History ==
Hernando de Soto crossed Otter Creek during his explorations of Florida in 1539.

It was settled in 1856, and the community was called "Otter Creek Ford".

In the 1930s and 1940s, Otter Creek was the second largest community in Levy County, with a population approaching 1,000.

The loss of a lumber mill that made cypress "flitches" for citrus crates and the discontinuation of two railroads which bisected the town led to a steady population decline.

The Town of Otter Creek was officially incorporated as a municipality in 1969.

In 2007, the town council created a local historic district consisting of neighborhoods with "company town" residences that date from the 19th and early 20th century

After the closure of the lumber mill, there has been very little business or commercial activity within Otter Creek. By 2019, only two small businesses remained, an independently-owned convenience store (no gasoline) located at the intersection of Highways 19 and 24, and the Creekside Christian School, a private, primary school operating on the grounds of Otter Creek Baptist Church.

To the extent that other businesses existed, they have closed due to the deaths of their owners or otherwise failed. Some notable examples were the Smith Store and the Country Store, both community-centric and vibrant in their days. The Smith Store was operated by Ella Graham (deceased 1996), whose grandson once delivered groceries and dry goods to the town residents on a Shetland pony. The Country Store, originally built and operated by Junior and Philene Williams, changed hands after their deaths, but permanently closed about 2000. There was an animal hide tannery until about 1980, and a few bait shops and convenience stores. The remnants of nearly all are now decrepit.

== Geography ==
According to the United States Census Bureau, the town has a total area of 1.5 square miles (3.8 km^{2}), of which 1.4 square miles (3.7 km^{2}) is land and 0.019 square miles (0.05 km^{2}) (1.28%) is water.

=== Climate ===
The climate in this area is characterized by hot, humid summers and generally mild winters. According to the Köppen climate classification, the Town of Otter Creek has a humid subtropical climate zone (Cfa).

== Demographics ==
Historical population
Census	Pop.	Note	%±
1970	230		—
1980	167		−27.4%
1990	136		−18.6%
2000	121		−11.0%
2010	134		10.7%
2020	108		−19.4%
U.S. Decennial Census

=== 2010 and 2020 census ===
Otter Creek racial composition (Hispanics excluded from racial categories) (NH = Non-Hispanic)
Race	Pop 2010	Pop 2020	% 2010	% 2020
White (NH)	126	93	94.03%	86.11%
Black or African American (NH)	4	2	2.99%	1.85%
Native American or Alaska Native (NH)	0	3	0.00%	2.78%
Asian (NH)	0	0	0.00%	0.00%
Pacific Islander or Native Hawaiian (NH)	0	0	0.00%	0.00%
Some other race (NH)	0	2	0.00%	1.85%
Two or more races/Multiracial (NH)	1	1	0.75%	0.93%
Hispanic or Latino (any race)	3	7	2.24%	6.48%
Total	134	108		

As of the 2020 United States census, there were 108 people, 44 households, and 33 families residing in the town.

As of the 2010 United States census, there were 134 people, 65 households, and 49 families residing in the town.

=== 2000 census ===
As of the census of 2000, there were 121 people, 54 households, and 32 families residing in the town. The population density was 84.7 inhabitants per square mile (32.7/km^{2}). There were 70 housing units at an average density of 49.0 per square mile (18.9/km^{2}). The racial makeup of the town was 93.39% White, 3.31% African American, 2.48% from other races, and 0.83% from two or more races. Hispanic or Latino of any race were 4.96% of the population.

In 2000, there were 54 households, out of which 22.2% had children under the age of 18 living with them, 51.9% were married couples living together, 3.7% had a female householder with no husband present, and 40.7% were non-families. 31.5% of all households were made up of individuals, and 14.8% had someone living alone who was 65 years of age or older. The average household size was 2.24 and the average family size was 2.91.

In 2000, in the town, the population was spread out, with 17.4% under the age of 18, 7.4% from 18 to 24, 20.7% from 25 to 44, 37.2% from 45 to 64, and 17.4% who were 65 years of age or older. The median age was 46 years. For every 100 females, there were 108.6 males. For every 100 females age 18 and over, there were 100.0 males.

In 2000, the median income for a household in the town was $18,036, and the median income for a family was $19,821. Males had a median income of $30,000 versus $22,500 for females. The per capita income for the town was $13,101. There were 12.1% of families and 20.2% of the population living below the poverty line, including no under eighteens and 17.2% of those over 64.
