= Fowler's Bluff, Florida =

Unincorporated community in Florida, U.S.

Coordinates: 29°23′48″N 83°01′26″W

Fowler's Bluff is an unincorporated community in Levy County, Florida, United States. It is a small, riverside central Florida community near the southern end of the Suwannee River. The nearest significant city is Chiefland, approximately 15 miles to the northeast. The community provides river access via a public boat ramp located at 15597 NW 46th Lane, Chiefland, FL 32626.
