= Levy County, Florida =

County in Florida, United States

- County
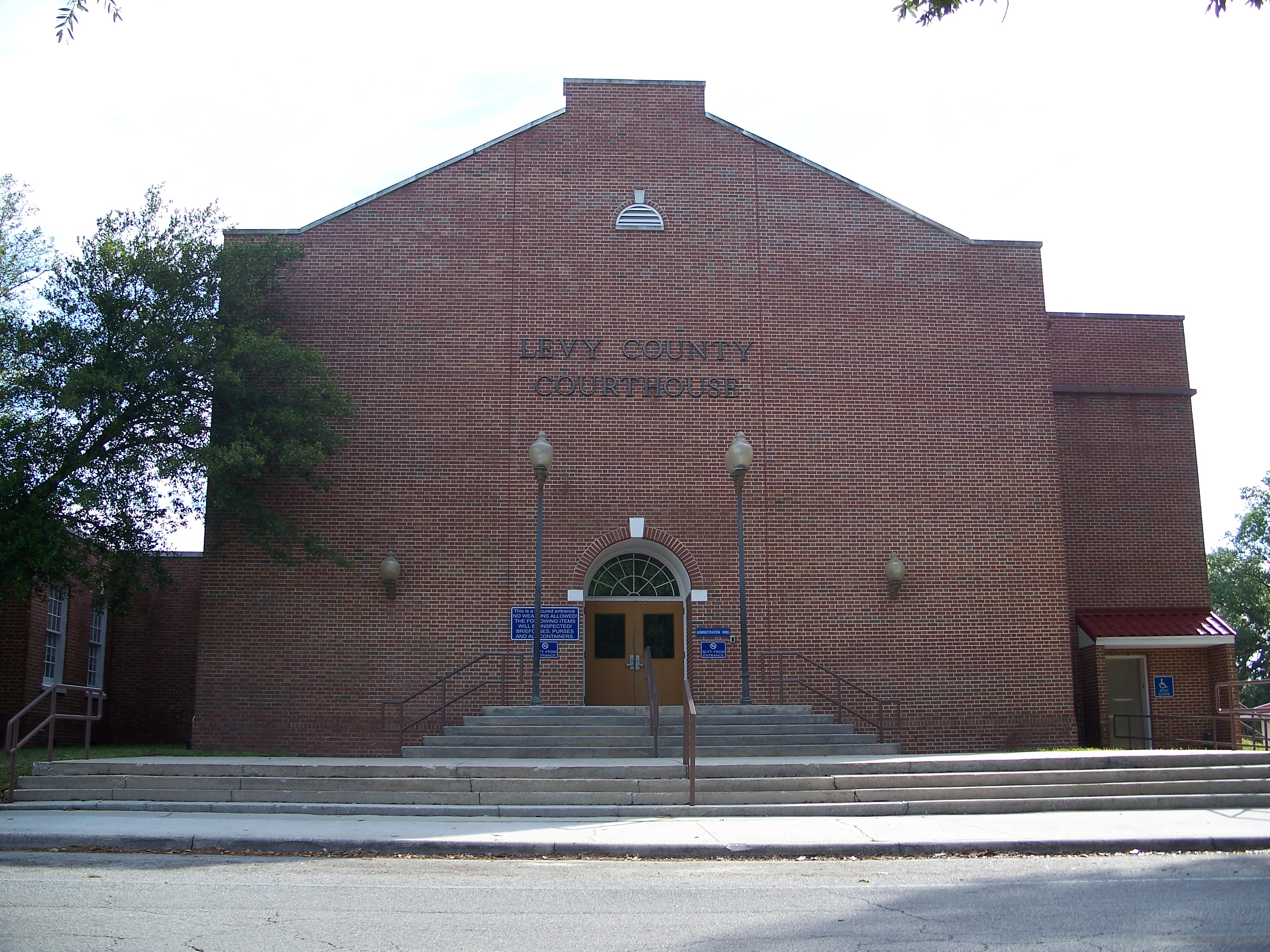
- Levy County Courthouse

- Location within the U.S. state of Florida
- Coordinates: 29°17′N 82°47′W
- Country: United States
- State: Florida
- Founded: March 10, 1845
- Named for: David Levy Yulee
- Seat: Bronson
- Largest city: Williston

Area
  - Total: 1,413 sq mi (3,660 km^{2})
  - Land: 1,118 sq mi (2,900 km^{2})
  - Water: 295 sq mi (760 km^{2}) 20.9%

Population (2020)
  - Total: 42,915
  - Estimate (2025): 48,520 ▲
  - Density: 38.39/sq mi (14.82/km^{2})
- Time zone: UTC−5 (Eastern)
  - Summer (DST): UTC−4 (EDT)
- Congressional district: 3rd
- Website: www.levycounty.org

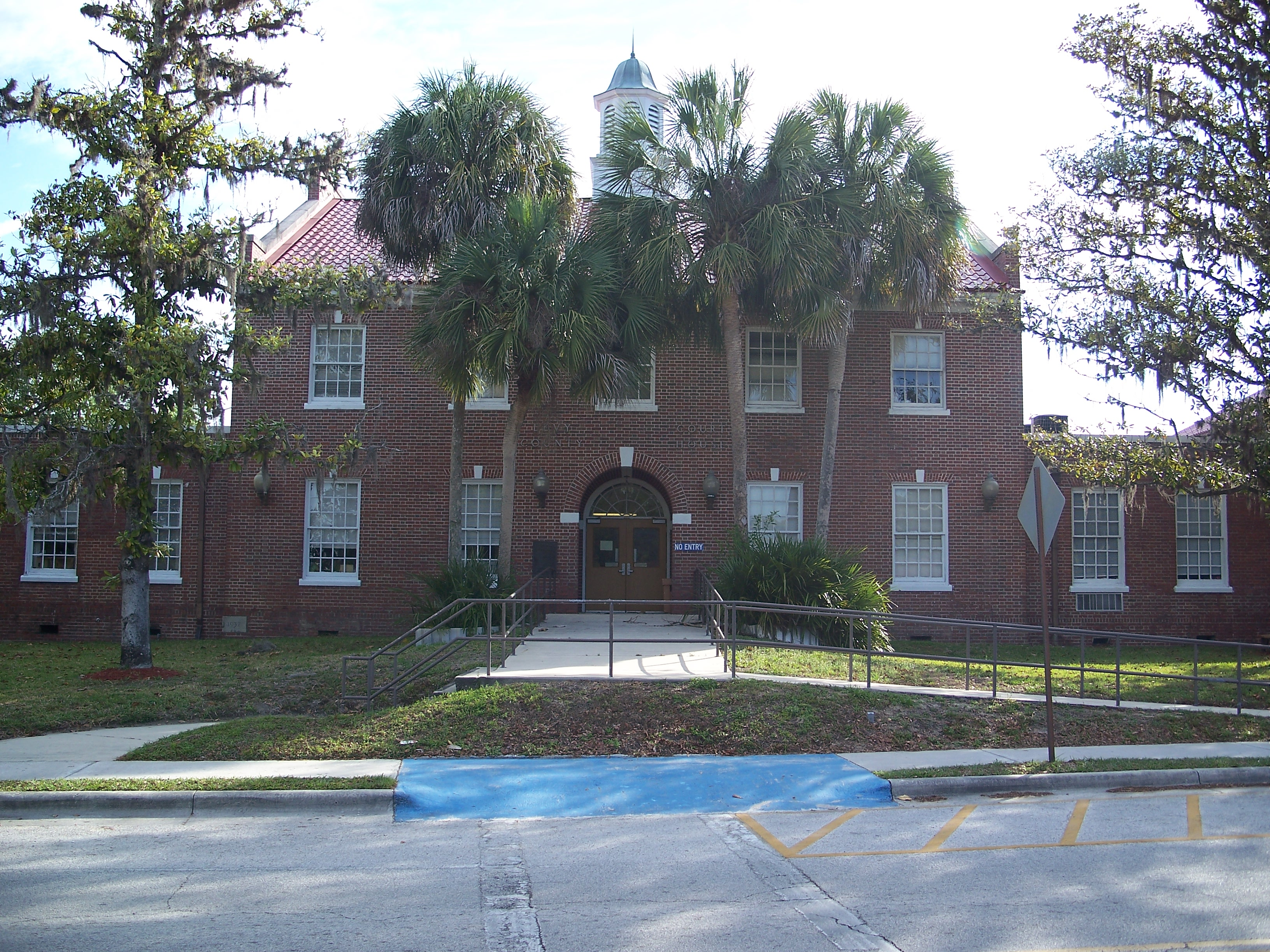
Levy County Courthouse, in Bronson

Levy County (/ˈliːvi/ LEE-vee) is a county located in the North central Florida part of the U.S. state of Florida. As of the 2020 census, the population was 42,915. Its county seat is Bronson. It has been included in the Gainesville, Florida Metropolitan Statistical Area since 2018.

== History ==
Levy County was created in 1845, after the Seminole Wars, and became Florida's 27th county. It was named for David Levy Yulee, a slave owner elected in 1841 as the state's territorial delegate to the US House of Representatives, where he served two terms.

Levy provided for long-term development in the state by constructing the first railroad across Florida, the Florida Railroad, linking the deep-water ports of Fernandina (Port of Fernandina) on the Atlantic Ocean and Cedar Key on the Gulf of Mexico.

The original county seat of Levy County was located in a neighborhood locally known as Sodom. This concerned the county commission so much that in April 1854 they changed the name to “Mount Pleasant”. The name was changed again in January 1856 to "Levyville". An act of the State of Florida legislature ordered the county commissioners to let the county residents vote on the location of the county seat. In 1869, a vote was held to decide the location for the county seat. Bronson was selected by popular vote. County officials cited illegal votes cast in every precinct, so a new election was set to take place in 30 days. The Board of County Commissioners would later reverse their previous decision and let the vote stand. The process to build a new courthouse at Bronson began along with the removal of the courthouse at Levyville.

In 1874, the county seat was moved to Bronson, originally known as “Chunky Pond”, and was named after an early settler, Isaac Bronson.

The Rosewood Massacre occurred in Levy County in the first week of January 1923. White citizens from the nearby town of Sumner, reacting to a what turned out to be a false accusation that a black man raped a white woman, burned the predominantly black town of Rosewood to the ground and brutally murdered several of Rosewood's black citizens. A film based on the incident was made in 1997, but was not filmed in Levy County.

== Geography ==
According to the U.S. Census Bureau, the county has a total area of 1,413 square miles (3,660 km^{2}), of which 1,118 square miles (2,900 km^{2}) is land and 295 square miles (760 km^{2}) (20.9%) is water.

=== Adjacent counties ===
- Dixie County — west
- Gilchrist County — north
- Alachua County — northeast
- Marion County — east
- Citrus County — south

=== National protected areas ===
- Cedar Keys National Wildlife Refuge
- Lower Suwannee National Wildlife Refuge (part)

== Demographics ==
Historical population
Census	Pop.	Note	%±
1850	465		—
1860	1,781		283.0%
1870	2,018		13.3%
1880	5,767		185.8%
1890	6,586		14.2%
1900	8,603		30.6%
1910	10,361		20.4%
1920	9,921		−4.2%
1930	12,456		25.6%
1940	12,550		0.8%
1950	10,637		−15.2%
1960	10,364		−2.6%
1970	12,756		23.1%
1980	19,870		55.8%
1990	25,923		30.5%
2000	34,450		32.9%
2010	40,801		18.4%
2020	42,915		5.2%
2025 (est.)	48,520	▲	13.1%
U.S. Decennial Census; 1790-1960 1900-1990; 1990-2000 2010-2015 2019

Levy County, Florida – Racial and ethnic composition Note: the US Census treats Hispanic/Latino as an ethnic category. This table excludes Latinos from the racial categories and assigns them to a separate category. Hispanics/Latinos may be of any race.
Race / Ethnicity (NH = Non-Hispanic)	Pop 1980	Pop 1990	Pop 2000	Pop 2010	Pop 2020	% 1980	% 1990	% 2000	% 2010	% 2020
White alone (NH)	16,383	22,014	28,654	32,958	32,874	82.45%	84.92%	83.18%	80.78%	76.60%
Black or African American alone (NH)	3,116	3,204	3,734	3,756	3,597	15.68%	12.36%	10.84%	9.21%	8.38%
Native American or Alaska Native alone (NH)	37	105	134	129	122	0.19%	0.41%	0.39%	0.32%	0.28%
Asian alone (NH)	61	103	129	228	292	0.31%	0.40%	0.37%	0.56%	0.68%
Native Hawaiian or Pacific Islander alone (NH)	x	x	10	14	11	x	x	0.03%	0.03%	0.03%
Other race alone (NH)	15	7	50	48	170	0.08%	0.03%	0.15%	0.12%	0.40%
Mixed race or Multiracial (NH)	x	x	400	621	1,769	x	x	1.16%	1.52%	4.12%
Hispanic or Latino (any race)	258	490	1,339	3,047	4,080	1.30%	1.89%	3.89%	7.47%	9.51%
Total	19,870	25,923	34,450	40,801	42,915	100.00%	100.00%	100.00%	100.00%	100.00%

=== 2020 census ===
As of the 2020 census, there were 42,915 people, 17,756 households, and 10,747 families residing in the county. The median age was 48.3 years, 20.1% of residents were under the age of 18, and 25.2% were 65 years of age or older. For every 100 females there were 96.8 males, and for every 100 females age 18 and over there were 94.5 males age 18 and over.

The racial makeup of the county was 79.5% White, 8.6% Black or African American, 0.5% American Indian and Alaska Native, 0.7% Asian, <0.1% Native Hawaiian and Pacific Islander, 3.3% from some other race, and 7.4% from two or more races. Hispanic or Latino residents of any race comprised 9.5% of the population.

<0.1% of residents lived in urban areas, while 100.0% lived in rural areas.

There were 20,868 housing units, of which 14.9% were vacant. Among occupied housing units, 79.8% were owner-occupied and 20.2% were renter-occupied. The homeowner vacancy rate was 2.1% and the rental vacancy rate was 7.5%.

=== 2000 census ===
As of the census of 2000, there were 34,450 people, 13,867 households, and 9,679 families residing in the county. The population density was 31 people per square mile (12 people/km^{2}). There were 16,570 housing units at an average density of 15 per square mile (5.8/km^{2}). The racial makeup of the county was 85.88% White, 10.97% Black or African American, 0.47% Native American, 0.37% Asian, 0.03% Pacific Islander, 0.96% from other races, and 1.32% from two or more races. 3.89% of the population were Hispanic or Latino of any race.

There were 13,867 households, out of which 27.40% had children under the age of 18 living with them, 53.40% were married couples living together, 11.80% had a female householder with no husband present, and 30.20% were non-families. 24.90% of all households were made up of individuals, and 11.60% had someone living alone who was 65 years of age or older. The average household size was 2.44 and the average family size was 2.88.

In the county, the population was spread out, with 23.60% under the age of 18, 6.90% from 18 to 24, 25.00% from 25 to 44, 26.60% from 45 to 64, and 17.90% who were 65 years of age or older. The median age was 41 years. For every 100 females there were 94.00 males. For every 100 females age 18 and over, there were 90.80 males.

The median income for a household in the county was $26,959, and the median income for a family was $30,899. Males had a median income of $26,029 versus $20,252 for females. The per capita income for the county was $14,746. About 15.00% of families and 18.60% of the population were below the poverty line, including 25.80% of those under age 18 and 12.90% of those age 65 or over.

== Proposed nuclear power plant ==
On April 7, 2008, Progress Energy Florida of St. Petersburg announced it had authorized Shaw and Westinghouse to purchase long-lead-time materials for up to two AP1000 nuclear reactors for its Levy County plant, a greenfield plant in Levy County, producing about 1,100 MW each.

Progress expects to apply for a Combined Construction and Operating License (COL) in the summer of 2008, according to a spokeswoman. Southern Company and SCANA, of whom each own an interest in the plant, would not reveal cost estimates, but Progress has said its plant will cost $14 billion, with an additional $3 billion required for transmission infrastructure.

Applying for a COL does not commit the utilities to construct the plant, but it is part of the licensing process, say officials of all the utilities. The application starts a 40-month review by the Nuclear Regulatory Commission, meaning that approval could come in August 2011.

In late July 2013 the company said it had scrapped its plan to build the plant.

== Politics ==
United States presidential election results for Levy County, Florida
Year	Republican		Democratic		Third party(ies)	
Year	No.	%	No.	%	No.	%
1904	151	24.59%	426	69.38%	37	6.03%
1908	189	27.19%	411	59.14%	95	13.67%
1912	74	13.91%	375	70.49%	83	15.60%
1916	216	22.29%	712	73.48%	41	4.23%
1920	377	29.50%	882	69.01%	19	1.49%
1924	214	26.23%	524	64.22%	78	9.56%
1928	711	46.23%	797	51.82%	30	1.95%
1932	123	7.05%	1,621	92.95%	0	0.00%
1936	183	8.37%	2,003	91.63%	0	0.00%
1940	266	9.52%	2,527	90.48%	0	0.00%
1944	225	9.65%	2,107	90.35%	0	0.00%
1948	225	11.12%	1,128	55.76%	670	33.12%
1952	1,066	34.66%	2,010	65.34%	0	0.00%
1956	934	33.90%	1,821	66.10%	0	0.00%
1960	996	33.21%	2,003	66.79%	0	0.00%
1964	1,580	44.31%	1,986	55.69%	0	0.00%
1968	745	18.81%	767	19.36%	2,449	61.83%
1972	3,273	79.12%	862	20.84%	2	0.05%
1976	1,965	31.87%	4,025	65.28%	176	2.85%
1980	3,210	42.26%	4,170	54.90%	216	2.84%
1984	5,561	64.19%	3,103	35.81%	0	0.00%
1988	5,253	59.75%	3,434	39.06%	104	1.18%
1992	3,796	34.71%	4,330	39.59%	2,810	25.69%
1996	4,299	38.85%	4,938	44.63%	1,828	16.52%
2000	6,863	53.91%	5,398	42.40%	469	3.68%
2004	10,410	62.52%	6,074	36.48%	168	1.01%
2008	11,754	62.56%	6,711	35.72%	324	1.72%
2012	12,054	65.31%	6,119	33.15%	284	1.54%
2016	13,775	70.64%	5,101	26.16%	623	3.20%
2020	16,749	72.24%	6,205	26.76%	231	1.00%
2024	18,245	74.62%	5,994	24.51%	212	0.87%

=== Voter registration ===
According to the Secretary of State's office, Republicans comprise a majority of registered voters in Levy County.

Levy County Voter Registration and Party Enrollment as of December 31, 2024
Political party	Total voters	Percentage		
Republican	18,413	60.0%		
Democratic	6,688	21.8%		
other party affiliation	5,579	18.2%		
	Total		30,680	100%

== Public safety ==
The Levy County Sheriff's Office is the primary law enforcement agency in Levy County and is currently headed by Sheriff Bobby McCallum. In addition, several municipal police departments and state agencies operate in Levy County, including:

- Chiefland Police Department
- Cedar Key Pollice Department
- Williston Police Department
- Florida Highway Patrol

Levy County Department of Public Safety provides Fire and EMS services to citizens and visitors, including operating a fleet of Advanced Life Support transport units. Fire and First Responder services are also provided by surrounding municipal agencies, including:

- Bronson Fire Rescue
- Cedar Key Fire Rescue
- Chiefland Fire Rescue
- Fanning Springs Fire Rescue
- Inglis Fire Rescue
- Williston Fire Rescue

== Education ==
=== Public schools ===
School Board of Levy County operates public schools. Its boundaries are that of the county.

=== Public libraries ===
The Levy County Public Library System has five branches:

- Bronson Public Library, Bronson
- Cedar Key Public Library, Cedar Key
- Luther Callaway Public Library, Chiefland
- Williston Public Library, Williston
- A.F. Knotts Public Library, Yankeetown

== Transportation ==
=== Airports ===
- George T. Lewis Airport
- Williston Municipal Airport
- Ames Field

=== Public transit ===
Levy County Transit has public buses but does not have routes available online.

=== Railroads ===
Levy County has only one railroad line running throughout the county, and only within eastern Levy along US 41. The line is a former Atlantic Coast Line Railroad line that is now used by the Florida Northern Railroad for freight to the Crystal River 3 Nuclear Power Plant in Red Level, Citrus County. Notable abandoned lines include a Seaboard Air Line Railroad line that is in proximity to the existing former ACL line, a Florida Railway and Navigation Company line running parallel to State Road 24, and a third in western and southern Levy County that spans from Fanning Springs towards the Dunnellon area running along US 19-98 until it reaches Lebanon Junction, where it runs along CR 336. The segment of that line between Fanning Springs and Chiefland is part of the Nature Coast State Trail.

=== Major roads ===
- US 19 / US 98 (SR 55) is the main local road through western Levy County, running south to north.
- US 27 runs northwest to southeast from Marion County and joins US 41 in Williston on its way to High Springs.
- US 27 Alt. (SR 500) is a bannered alternate of US 27 that runs northwest and southeast from US 27/US 41/SR 121 in Williston to US 19/US 98 in Chiefland, which it joins on its way to Perry.
- US 41 (SR 45) is the main local road through eastern Levy County, running south to north. Until the north end of the concurrency with SR 121 in Williston, the road is also shared by the DeSoto Trail.
- US 129 (SR 49) is an auxiliary route of US 29 that runs northeast from Chiefland, and then turns north in Trenton on its way through Jasper before heading north into Georgia.
- SR 24 is an east to west highway through the central part of the county from Cedar Key into Alachua County. A county-suffixed alternate route can be found in Bronson.
- SR 121 is a south to north road that runs southwest to northeast from Lebanon Junction through Williston, and then into Alachua County and beyond, as it takes a long journey through Georgia and South Carolina as a tri-state de facto auxiliary route from U.S. Route 21 in Rock Hill, South Carolina.
- SR 320 is an east–west route connecting Manatee Springs State Park with US 19/98/Alternate US 27 in Chiefland. A county extension of the road exists north of the eastern terminus with US 19/98/ALT 27 leading to CR 339 in Newton.
- SR 345 / CR 345 is a combined county and state road spanning from Rosewood to Chiefland.
- CR 40 runs mostly east and west through southern Levy County. It spans from the Gulf of Mexico in Yankeetown winding along the Withlacoochee River, on the way to Dunnellon and Rainbow Lakes Estates in Marion County, where it eventually becomes State Road 40. The segment between the Gulf of Mexico and US 19-98 is officially named Follow That Dream Boulevard, after the 1962 Elvis Presley movie.
- CR 326 runs mostly east and west through southeastern Levy County as a bi-county extension of State Road 326. It spans from a dead end at the Waccasassa River in Gulf Hammock winding northeast through US 19-98 until it reaches CR 343 where it turns east. After running through Goethe State Forest it intersects CR 337 in Morris Junction, and then SR 121. By the time it reaches eastern Levy County it has a brief multiplex with southbound US 41 where both serve as the southern terminus of CR 323, only for CR 326 to turn east again as it eventually crosses the Levy-Marion County line, on the way to Ocala and Silver Springs. The segment between I-75 (Exit 358) and SR 40 becomes a state road.
- CR 336 is a bi-county road that runs mostly southeast and northwest through southwestern Levy County in two segments. It spans from CR 347 southwest of Chiefland, along various local streets, and even overlaps CR 345, then runs southeast toward SR 24 at Otter Creek. From there it is hidden along local streets that merge with US 19–98, which completely overshadows it until the at-grade interchange with SR 121 in Lebanon Junction, where it is exposed again running through the southern segment of Goethe State Forest, and later crosses the Levy-Marion County line, where it overlaps CR 40 all the way to Dunnellon.
- CR 337 is a tri-county road that runs south and north through central Levy County, as well as southwestern Alachua and eastern Gilchrist counties. It spans from CR 336 in Goethe State Forest and runs primarily along the eastern outskirts of the forest occasionally entering some forest land. North of the forest area, it enters the city of Bronson, where it intersects US Alternate 27, SR 24 and CR 32. Further north of the city limits it crosses the Levy-Alachua County line.

== Communities ==
#	Incorporated Community	Designation	Population (2020)
1	Williston	City	2,976
2	Chiefland	City	2,316
3	Inglis	Town	1,476
5	Bronson (county seat)	Town	1,140
4	Fanning Springs#	City	1,182
6	Cedar Key	City	687
7	Yankeetown	City	588
8	Otter Creek	City	108

(#) Partially in Gilchrist County

#	Census-designated places	Population (2020)
1	Rainbow Lakes Estates#	3,438
2	Williston Highlands	2,591
3	Manatee Road	2,484
4	East Bronson	2,025
5	Andrews	837
6	East Williston	780
7	Raleigh	357
8	Morriston	165

(#) Partially in Marion County

=== Other unincorporated communities ===
- Curryville
- Ellzey
- Fowlers Bluff
- Gulf Hammock
- Lebanon Station
- Peaceful Acres
- Rosewood
- Sumner
- Tuckaho
- Turkeytown
- Usher
- Wakahoota

=== Ghost communities ===
- Albion
- Butler
- Double Sink
- Elmwood
- Eve
- Gore
- Gunntown
- Janney
- Judson
- Levyville
- Lontine
- Merdiths
- Moody
- Montbrook

== See also ==
- National Register of Historic Places listings in Levy County, Florida
