= Andrews, Levy County, Florida =

Andrews, Florida
- Census-designated place
- Location of Andrews in Levy County, Florida
- Coordinates: 29°32′50″N 82°52′36″W
- Country: United States
- State: Florida
- County: Levy

Area
  - Total: 5.42 sq mi (14.03 km^{2})
  - Land: 5.42 sq mi (14.03 km^{2})
  - Water: 0 sq mi (0.00 km^{2})
- Elevation: 39 ft (12 m)

Population (2020)
  - Total: 837
  - Density: 154.5/sq mi (59.64/km^{2})
- Time zone: UTC-5 (Eastern (EST))
  - Summer (DST): UTC-4 (EDT)
- FIPS code: 12-01353
- GNIS feature ID: 2402646

Andrews is a census-designated place (CDP) in Levy County, Florida, United States. The population was 837 at the 2020 census, up from 798 at the 2010 census. It is part of the Gainesville, Florida Metropolitan Statistical Area.

== Geography ==
Andrews is located in northwestern Levy County. It is bordered to the south by Chiefland and to the northwest by Fanning Springs. U.S. Routes 19, 98 and 27 Alt pass through Andrews as a four-lane highway, connecting Chiefland and Fanning Springs. The Andrews Wildlife Management Area is located west of the community.

According to the United States Census Bureau, the Andrews CDP has a total area of 5.4 square miles (14.0 km^{2}), all land.

== Demographics ==
Historical population
Census	Pop.	Note	%±
2000	708		—
2010	798		12.7%
2020	837		4.9%
U.S. Decennial Census

As of the census of 2000, there were 708 people, 294 households, and 204 families residing in the CDP. The population density was 103.7 inhabitants per square mile (40.0/km^{2}). There were 345 housing units at an average density of 50.5 per square mile (19.5/km^{2}). The racial makeup of the CDP was 97.32% White, 1.27% African American, 0.71% Native American, 0.42% from other races, and 0.28% from two or more races. Hispanic or Latino of any race were 2.26% of the population.

There were 294 households, out of which 26.2% had children under the age of 18 living with them, 55.4% were married couples living together, 7.8% had a female householder with no husband present, and 30.3% were non-families. 24.1% of all households were made up of individuals, and 10.2% had someone living alone who was 65 years of age or older. The average household size was 2.41 and the average family size was 2.77.

In the CDP, the population was spread out, with 22.0% under the age of 18, 6.5% from 18 to 24, 28.2% from 25 to 44, 26.8% from 45 to 64, and 16.4% who were 65 years of age or older. The median age was 41 years. For every 100 females, there were 99.4 males. For every 100 females age 18 and over, there were 97.1 males.

The median income for a household in the CDP was $26,554, and the median income for a family was $29,279. Males had a median income of $28,281 versus $20,588 for females. The per capita income for the CDP was $12,186. About 13.7% of families and 18.2% of the population were below the poverty line, including 23.4% of those under age 18 and 23.6% of those age 65 or over.
