= Morriston, Florida =

- Census-designated place
- Location within Florida Location within the United States
- Coordinates: 29°16′52″N 82°26′24″W
- Country: United States
- State: Florida
- County: Levy

Area
  - Total: 0.41 sq mi (1.06 km^{2})
  - Land: 0.41 sq mi (1.06 km^{2})
  - Water: 0 sq mi (0.00 km^{2})
- Elevation: 62 ft (19 m)

Population (2020)
  - Total: 165
  - Density: 404.1/sq mi (156.01/km^{2})
- Time zone: UTC-5 (Eastern (EST))
  - Summer (DST): UTC-4 (EDT)
- ZIP code: 32668
- FIPS code: 12-46725
- GNIS feature ID: 2628527

Morriston is a census-designated place (CDP) in Levy County, Florida, United States. The population was 165 at the 2020 census, up from 164 at the 2010 census. It is part of the Gainesville, Florida Metropolitan Statistical Area.

== Geography ==
Morriston is located in eastern Levy County. U.S. Route 41 forms the west edge of the community, leading north 8 miles (13 km) to Williston and south 17 miles (27 km) to Dunnellon.

According to the United States Census Bureau, the CDP has a total area of 0.42 square miles (1.1 km^{2}), all land.

== Demographics ==
Historical population
Census	Pop.	Note	%±
2010	164		—
2020	165		0.6%
U.S. Decennial Census

Morriston first appeared as a census designated place in the 2010 U.S. census.
