= Bronson, Florida =

- Town
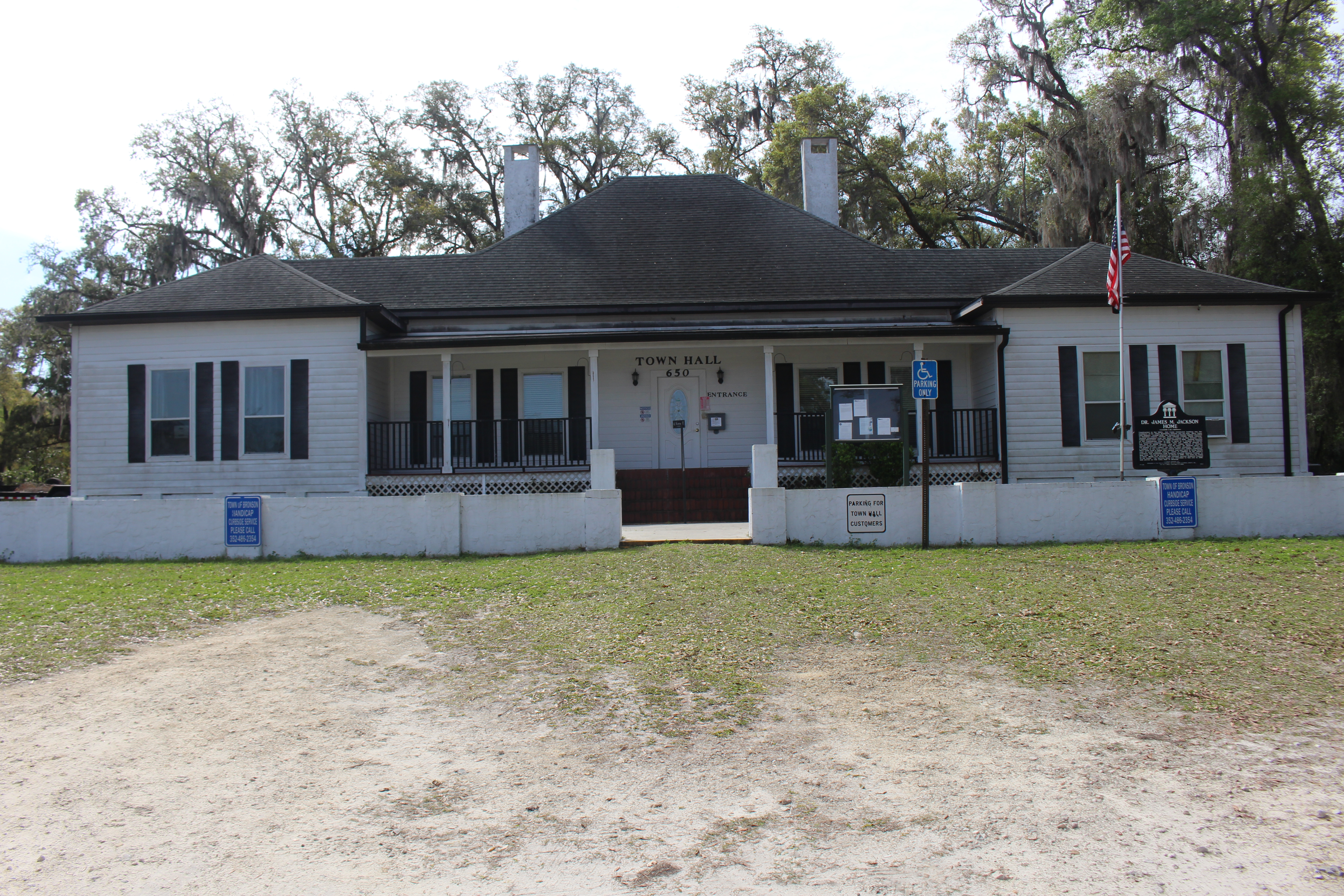
- Bronson Town Hall

- Seal
- Motto: "Heart of Levy County"
- Location in Levy County and the state of Florida
- Coordinates: 29°26′59″N 82°37′51″W
- Country: United States
- State: Florida
- County: Levy
- Settled (Chunky Pond): 1839
- Incorporated (Town of Bronson): 1951

Government
  - Type: Mayor-Council
  - Mayor: Bruce A. Greenlee
  - Vice Mayor: Virginia Phillips
  - Councilors: Reggie Stacy, Franklin Schuler, and Rachel Weeks
  - Town Manager: Amanda Huber
  - Town Clerk: Julia Cable

Area
  - Total: 4.37 sq mi (11.32 km^{2})
  - Land: 4.28 sq mi (11.09 km^{2})
  - Water: 0.089 sq mi (0.23 km^{2})
- Elevation: 69 ft (21 m)

Population (2020)
  - Total: 1,140
  - Density: 266.3/sq mi (102.83/km^{2})
- Time zone: UTC-5 (Eastern (EST))
  - Summer (DST): UTC-4 (EDT)
- ZIP code: 32621
- Area code: 352
- FIPS code: 12-08700
- GNIS feature ID: 2405325
- Website: townofbronson.org

Bronson is a town and the county seat of Levy County, Florida, United States. The population was 1,140 at the 2020 census, up from 1,113 at the 2010 census. It is part of the Gainesville metropolitan area, Florida. The Bronson Speedway is on its outskirts.

== History ==
Bronson began as a settlement in 1839 that was named after a judge, Isaac H. Bronson, who was an early settler to the Florida Territory before it became a state. Before the community's renaming, it was originally known as “Chunky Pond” after the Native American name, “Chuckahaha.”

Despite being settled since the early 19th century, and being Levy County's county seat since 1874, the Town of Bronson wasn't officially incorporated as a municipality until the mid-20th century, in 1951.

== Geography ==
The Town of Bronson is located near the northeast corner of Levy County.

According to the United States Census Bureau, the town has a total area of 4.2 square miles (11.0 km^{2}), of which 4.2 square miles (10.8 km^{2}) is land and 0.077 square miles (0.2 km^{2}), or 2.10%, is water.

=== Climate ===
The climate in this area is characterized by hot, humid summers and generally mild winters. According to the Köppen climate classification, the City of Bronson has a humid subtropical climate zone (Cfa).

== Demographics ==
Historical population
| Census | Pop. | Note | %± |
|---|---|---|---|
| 1890 | 291 | | — |
| 1930 | 694 | | — |
| 1940 | 758 | | 9.2% |
| 1950 | 624 | | −17.7% |
| 1960 | 707 | | 13.3% |
| 1970 | 698 | | −1.3% |
| 1980 | 853 | | 22.2% |
| 1990 | 875 | | 2.6% |
| 2000 | 964 | | 10.2% |
| 2010 | 1,113 | | 15.5% |
| 2020 | 1,140 | | 2.4% |
U.S. Decennial Census

=== Racial and ethnic composition ===
Bronson racial composition (Hispanics excluded from racial categories) (NH = Non-Hispanic)
| Race | Pop 2010 | Pop 2020 | % 2010 | % 2020 |
|---|---|---|---|---|
| White (NH) | 701 | 683 | 62.98% | 59.91% |
| Black or African American (NH) | 284 | 254 | 25.52% | 22.28% |
| Native American or Alaska Native (NH) | 5 | 0 | 0.45% | 0.00% |
| Asian (NH) | 3 | 11 | 0.27% | 0.96% |
| Pacific Islander or Native Hawaiian (NH) | 0 | 1 | 0.00% | 0.09% |
| Some other race (NH) | 0 | 15 | 0.00% | 1.32% |
| Two or more races/Multiracial (NH) | 29 | 53 | 2.61% | 4.65% |
| Hispanic or Latino (any race) | 91 | 123 | 8.18% | 10.79% |
| Total | 1,113 | 1,140 | | |

=== 2020 census ===
As of the 2020 census, Bronson had a population of 1,140. The median age was 38.5 years. 25.2% of residents were under the age of 18 and 17.7% of residents were 65 years of age or older. For every 100 females there were 96.6 males, and for every 100 females age 18 and over there were 92.1 males age 18 and over.

0.0% of residents lived in urban areas, while 100.0% lived in rural areas.

There were 441 households in Bronson, of which 30.8% had children under the age of 18 living in them. Of all households, 37.9% were married-couple households, 21.1% were households with a male householder and no spouse or partner present, and 32.9% were households with a female householder and no spouse or partner present. About 30.4% of all households were made up of individuals and 14.7% had someone living alone who was 65 years of age or older.

There were 520 housing units, of which 15.2% were vacant. The homeowner vacancy rate was 3.1% and the rental vacancy rate was 3.5%.

According to the 2020 American Community Survey 5-year estimates, there were 278 families residing in the town.

=== 2010 census ===
As of the 2010 United States census, there were 1,113 people, 507 households, and 356 families residing in the town.

=== 2000 census ===
As of the census of 2000, there were 964 people, 370 households, and 256 families residing in the town. The population density was 244.1 inhabitants per square mile (94.2/km^{2}). There were 431 housing units at an average density of 109.2 per square mile (42.2/km^{2}). The racial makeup of the town was 66.39% White, 29.15% African American, 1.45% Native American, 0.10% Asian, 2.07% from other races, and 0.83% from two or more races. Hispanic or Latino of any race were 8.09% of the population.

In 2000, there were 370 households, out of which 34.9% had children under the age of 18 living with them, 42.7% were married couples living together, 22.4% had a female householder with no husband present, and 30.8% were non-families. 25.7% of all households were made up of individuals, and 11.4% had someone living alone who was 65 years of age or older. The average household size was 2.61 and the average family size was 3.16.

In 2000, in the town, the population was spread out, with 29.1% under the age of 18, 12.0% from 18 to 24, 24.3% from 25 to 44, 22.6% from 45 to 64, and 11.9% who were 65 years of age or older. The median age was 32 years. For every 100 females, there were 81.9 males. For every 100 females age 18 and over, there were 76.5 males.

In 2000, the median income for a household in the town was $26,944, and the median income for a family was $28,462. Males had a median income of $27,969 versus $20,385 for females. The per capita income for the town was $12,532. About 21.9% of families and 27.2% of the population were below the poverty line, including 36.5% of those under age 18 and 21.4% of those age 65 or over.

== Education ==
The School Board of Levy County operates public schools. Bronson has two public schools: Bronson Middle High School and Bronson Elementary. The School Board of Levy County controls their operation and also supervises two charter schools: Nature Coast Middle School and Whispering Winds Charter School (PK-8). Other schools under the board's jurisdiction are in the city of Chiefland, the city of Williston, the city of Cedar Key, and the town of Yankeetown.

=== Library ===
Levy County provides Bronson with a local library branch. The Bronson Public Library was built by the Felburn Foundation founder; J. Phil Felburn. The Levy County Public Library System is a member of PAL (Putnam, Alachua and Levy County Public Library Cooperative).
