= Manatee Springs State Park =

State park in Florida, United States

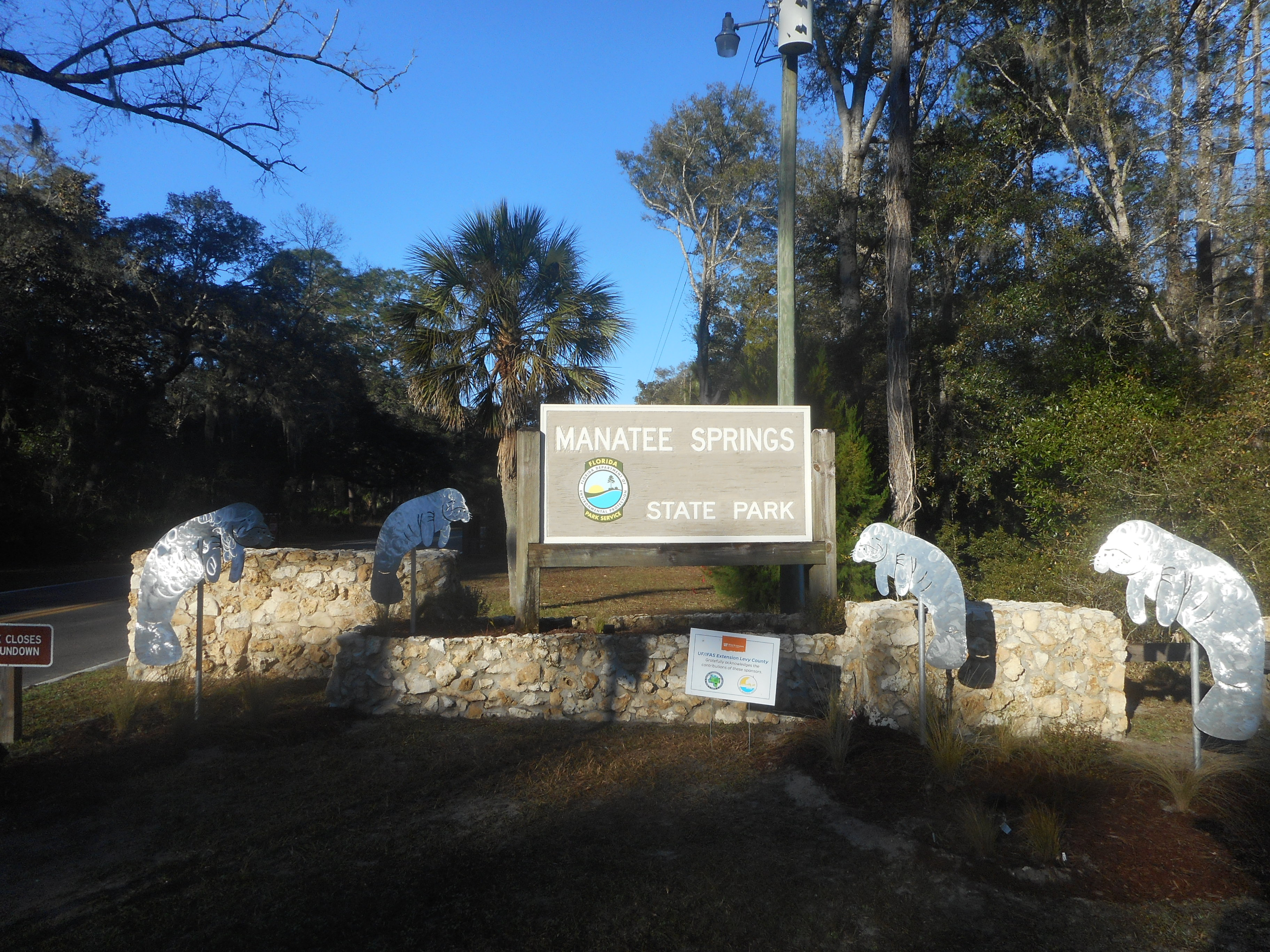
- Sign at the entrance to the park at the western end of Florida State Road 320

- Location within Florida Location within the United States
- Interactive map of Manatee Springs State Park
- Location: Levy County, Florida, USA
- Nearest city: Chiefland
- Coordinates: 29°29′25.49″N 82°58′37.47″W
- Governing body: Florida Department of Environmental Protection

U.S. National Natural Landmark
- Designated: December 1971

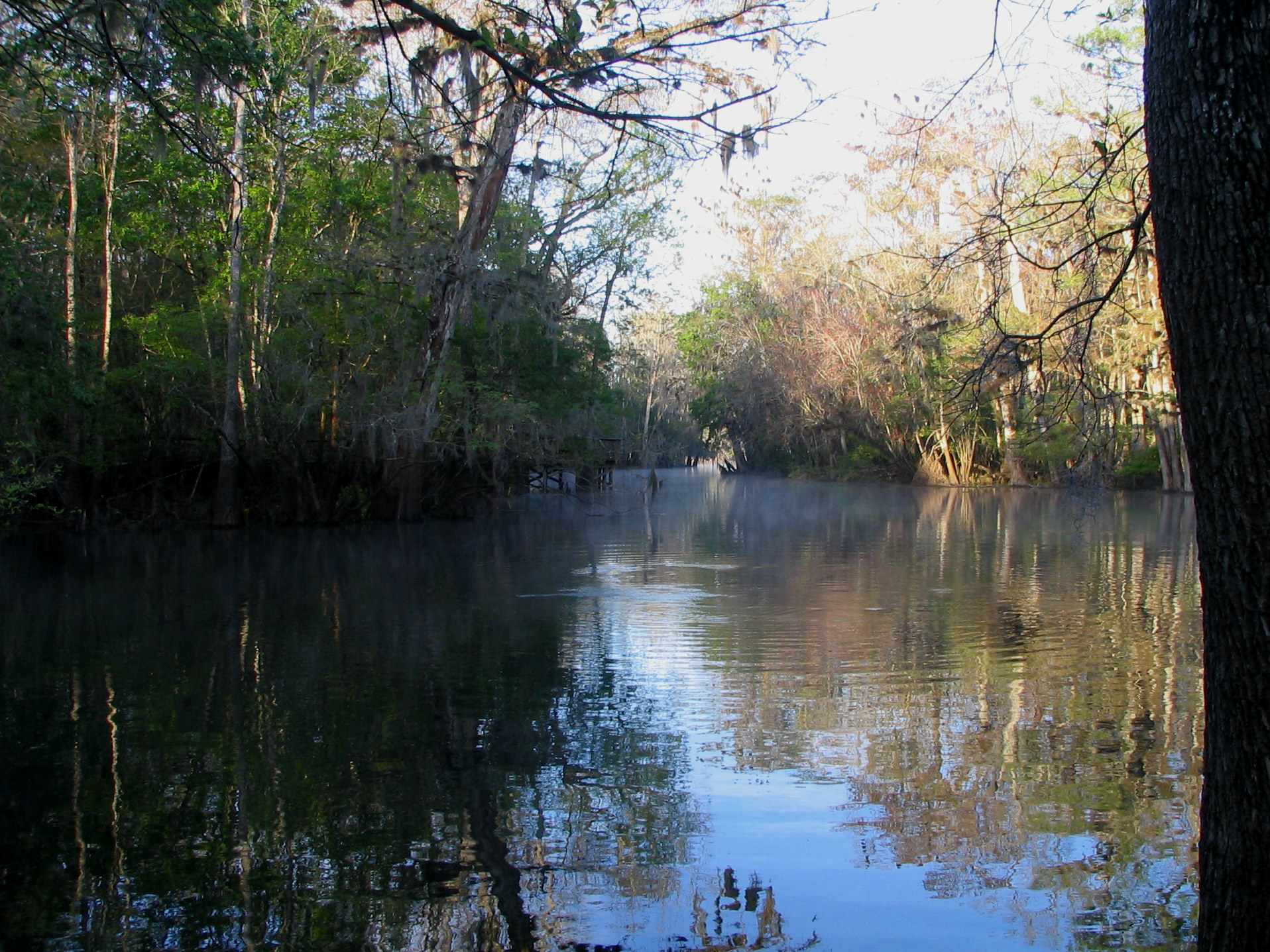
The Spring Run.

Manatee Springs State Park is a Florida State Park located six miles west of Chiefland on SR 320, off US 19. Manatee Spring is a first magnitude spring that flows directly into the Suwannee River by way of a short run (though it is the longest spring run feeding the Suwannee River). Present also are swamps and hardwood wetlands along the Suwannee, along with many sinkhole ponds, including one with a cave 90 feet below the ground that connects to a popular divers' destination known as the Catfish Hotel.

== History ==
Life in Manatee Springs dates back at least 9,000 years, the first known residents being the Timucuan Indians. According to a Manatee Spring park ranger, the picnic area located in the state park used to be a Timucuan Indian village site. The site was chosen for its prime location along the Suwannee river which provided access for transportation as well as fresh water. In the 1500s, the arrival of the Spaniards changed the cultural life that existed at the spring. Manatee Springs was visited in 1774 by William Bartram (1739–1823) and described in his book Travels through North & South Carolina, East & West Florida, the Cherokee Country, the Extensive Territories of the Muscogulges, or Creek Confederacy, and the Country of the Chactaws, Containing an Account of the Soil and Natural Productions of Those Regions, Together with Observations on the Manners of the Indians (1791); it was named by Bartram himself ("Manate Springs") after seeing a manatee carcass on the shoreline of the spring run.

During the Seminole Wars (1835- 1842), a significant attack near Manatee Spring, led by Major General Andrew Jackson, killed many of the Seminole Indians and forced the rest out of Florida. This left the area to settlers and farmers who moved into the springs to harvest timber, grow cotton and corn, and raise livestock. On January 23, 1968, Manatee Springs was the first spring to become a Florida State Park after it was sold to the state. Excavations at Manatee Spring Park have revealed that the Indian village was heavily populated throughout history. Fragments of pottery, bone awls, and arrowheads, mostly including materials from the Weeden Island period. Sea turtle and saltwater shells were also found at the village site, speculating the natives of Manatee Spring park used their access to the Suwannee River to travel to the Gulf of Mexico.

== Biology ==
Tree types in the park consist of cypress, sweetgum, maple and ash.

Largemouth bass, speckled perch, catfish and bream and longnose gar are some of the fish in this part of the Suwannee. White-tailed deer and various small mammals and birds can also be seen in the park year-round.

The West Indian Manatees, for which the spring is named, travel to the site often, as there are around 100 manatee sightings a year at the park. The springs are an ideal place for the manatees as the tannic acid, which darkens the Suwannee River, stunts the growth of aquatic plant life. The clear spring provides a place for the manatees to feed and rest from their 23-mile travel from the gulf. Manatees are more commonly seen in fall and winter, as the constant 72 °F (23 °C) temperature acts as a warm haven for them. Manatees cannot survive long in cold water, so the spring provides a good place to calve and shelter if winter is particularly harsh. In recent years, boat traffic threatened the life of manatees in the area and in order to prevent harming the manatees, the state park closes the spring run to boat traffic. This allows the manatee population to remain safe, increase in populations, and for more visitors to see these animals.

The spring also attracts large numbers of American black vultures, who winter here. The moss-draped cypress trees surrounding the spring run are filled with large, black birds. The vultures aren't particularly afraid of humans, but are not aggressive either.

== Recreational activities ==
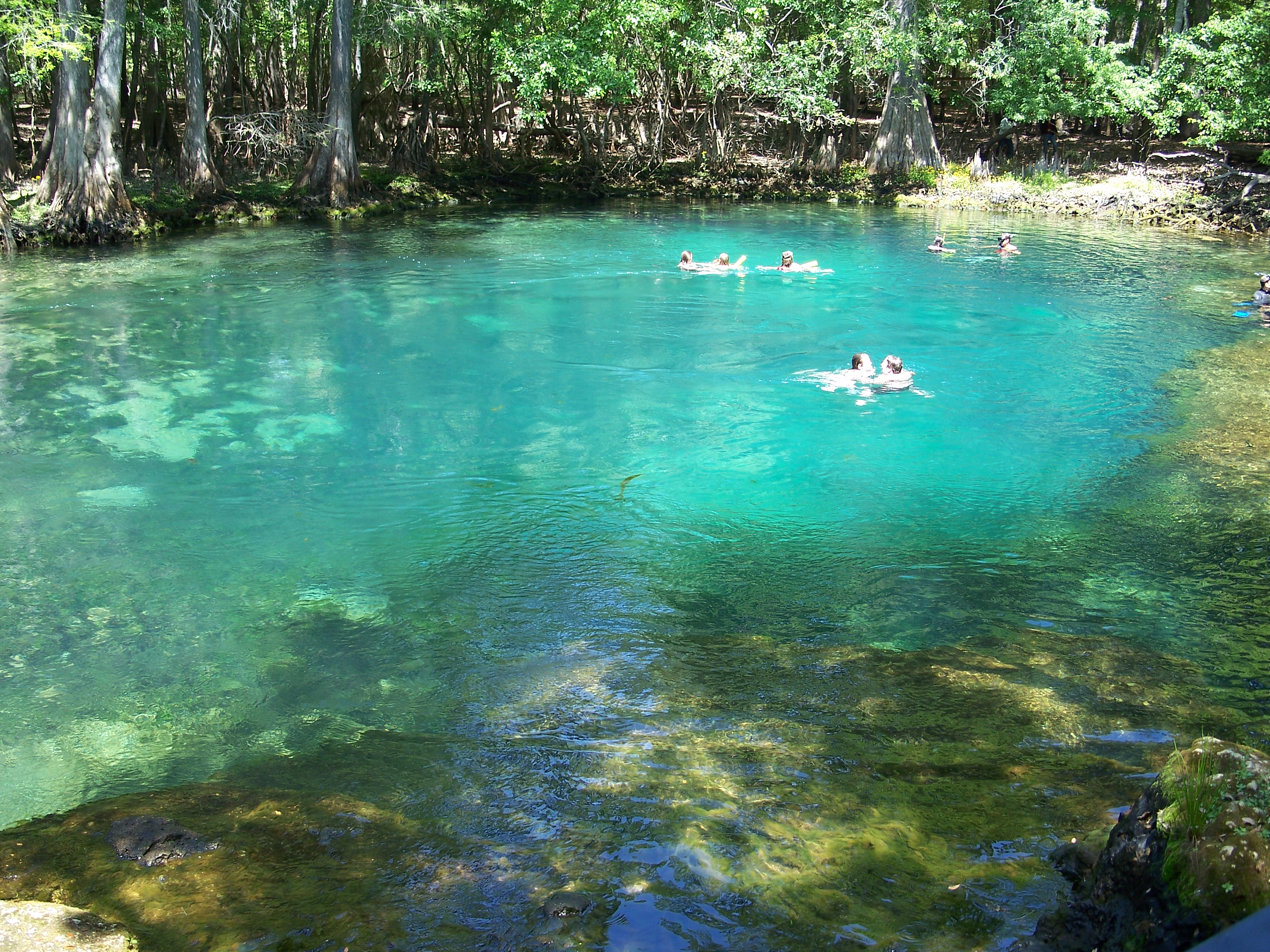
Swimming in the Spring.

Activities include hiking, biking, kayaking, canoeing, as well as scuba diving, swimming, snorkeling and wildlife viewing. Some of the amenities are a floating dock, boardwalk, eight miles of wooded off-road trails, picnic Pavilions and full camping facilities.

Once thought of as the longest cave in the world, Manatee Springs cave system includes over 20,000 explored and mapped caves. There are four main cavern openings located within Manatee Springs Park: Headspring, Catfish Hotel, Sue Sink, and Friedman's Sink. Swimming in the head spring and run is forbidden in winter, when manatees are more likely to be sheltering there. The Catfish Hotel sinkhole and karst window near the main spring remains open year-round with access to these caverns. Swimming and snorkeling is not allowed in the Catfish Hotel, and is generally unpleasant due to the layer of duck weed covering the water. Sue Sink is listed as an emergency exit only for cave divers in the system as ingress and egress is hazardous to the diver and causes soil erosion. Friedman Sink is available as an entrance to certified cave divers, and is the furthest upstream entrance to the system.

Certified Open Water divers can dive the head spring with lights, as well as the Catfish Hotel cavern without lights. Certified Cavern divers can dive the Catfish Hotel cavern with lights, but are not to explore beyond the daylight zone. Cavern divers should also exhibit caution when nearing the siphon side of the Catfish Hotel cavern, as the flow is immense. Certified and qualified cave divers are able to explore several miles of caverns which feed into the spring.

== Hours ==
The park is open from 8:00 am till sundown year round.
