= Gainesville metropolitan area, Florida =

Metropolitan area in Florida, United States

Gainesville metropolitan area
- Metropolitan Statistical Area
- Gainesville, FL Metropolitan Statistical Area
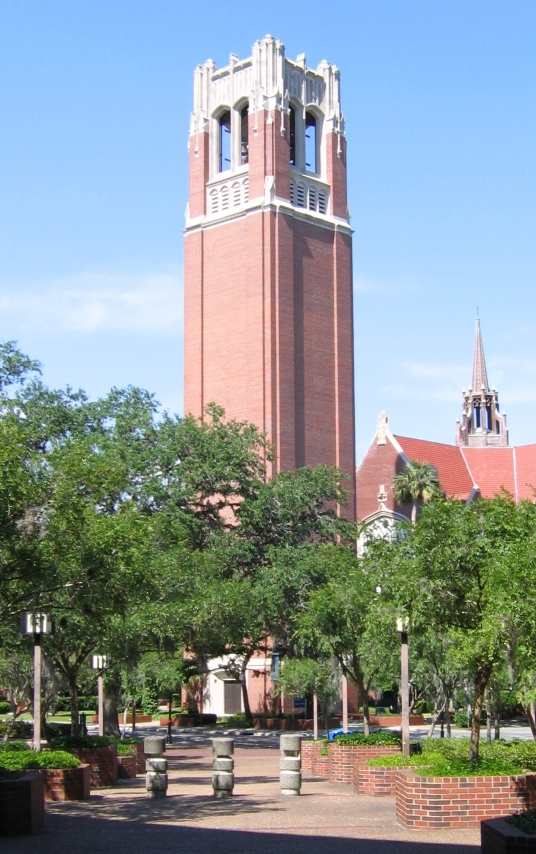
- Century Tower at the University of Florida
Interactive Map of Gainesville–Lake City, FL CSA
City of Gainesville
Gainesville, FL MSA
Lake City, FL µSA
- Country: United States
- State(s): Florida; Georgia
- Principal city: Gainesville
- Other cities: Alachua; Lake City
- Time zone: UTC-5 (EST)
  - Summer (DST): UTC-4 (EDT)

The Gainesville metropolitan area is the metropolitan area in North Central Florida that includes Alachua, Levy, and Gilchrist counties, with Gainesville, Florida the principal city. The metropolitan area had a population of 339,247 in 2020.

The U.S. Office of Management and Budget (OMB) designates the area as the Gainesville, FL Metropolitan Statistical Area (MSA), a metropolitan statistical area used for statistical purposes by the United States Census Bureau and other government agencies. The Gainesville, Florida Standard Metropolitan Statistical Area was first defined in 1971, consisting of only Alachua County. In 1983 Bradford County was added to the MSA. Bradford County was removed from the MSA in 1993. Gilchrist County was added to the MSA in 2003. Levy County was added to the MSA in 2018.

As of 2020, the OMB designated the Gainesville–Lake City, FL Combined Statistical Area (CSA), a combined statistical area consisting of the Gainesville, Florida MSA and the Lake City, Florida Micropolitan Statistical Area, which includes Columbia County.

As of 2020, the racial makeup of the MSA was 64.7% White, 16.7% African American, 0.3% American Indian or Alaskan Native, 5.4% Asian, 0.04% Native Hawaiian or Pacific Islanders, 3.4% some other race, and 9.4% from two or more races. Hispanics or Latinos of any race were 11.5% of the population.

== Counties ==
- Alachua
- Gilchrist
- Levy

== Demographics ==
County	Seat	2025 estimate	2020 Census	Change	Land area	Density
Alachua	Gainesville	290,028	278,468	+4.15%	875 sq mi (2,270 km^{2})	331/sq mi (128/km^{2})
Levy	Bronson	48,520	42,915	+13.06%	1,118 sq mi (2,900 km^{2})	43/sq mi (17/km^{2})
Gilchrist	Trenton	20,488	17,864	+14.69%	350 sq mi (910 km^{2})	59/sq mi (23/km^{2})
Total		359,036	339,247	+5.83%	2,343 sq mi (6,070 km^{2})	153/sq mi (59/km^{2})

== Combined Statistical Area ==
Statistical Area	2025 estimate	2020 Census	Change	Land area	Density
Gainesville, FL Metropolitan Statistical Area	359,036	339,247	+5.83%	2,343 sq mi (6,070 km^{2})	153/sq mi (59/km^{2})
Lake City, FL Micropolitan Statistical Area	74,094	69,698	+6.31%	798 sq mi (2,070 km^{2})	93/sq mi (36/km^{2})
Total	433,130	408,945	+5.91%	3,141 sq mi (8,140 km^{2})	138/sq mi (53/km^{2})

== See also ==
- Florida statistical areas
