= List of places in Florida: F =

fThis list of current cities, towns, unincorporated communities, counties, and other recognized places in the U.S. state of Florida also includes information on the number and names of counties in which the place lies, and its lower and upper zip code bounds, if applicable.

Name of place	Number of counties	Counties	Lower zip code	Upper zip code
Facil	1	Hamilton	32096	
Fairbanks	1	Alachua	32601	
Fairfield	1	Duval	32206	
Fairfield	1	Marion	32634	
Fair Gate	1	Broward	33063	
Fairgrounds	1	Jackson		
Fairlane Estates	1	Seminole		
Fairlawn	1	Broward		
Fairmont	1	Duval	32216	
Fairview	1	Columbia		
Fairview Shores	1	Orange	32804	
Fairvilla	1	Orange	32804	
Fairyland	1	Brevard	32952	
Fakahatchee	1	Collier		
Falmouth	1	Suwannee	32060	
Fanlew	1	Jefferson		
Fanning Springs	2	Gilchrist, Levy	32693	
Farmdale	1	Bay		
Farm Hill	1	Escambia		
Farmton	1	Volusia	32764	
Fatio	1	Volusia	32720	
Favoretta	1	Flagler		
Favorita	1	Flagler	32010	
Fawn Ford	1	Liberty		
Feather Sound	1	Pinellas	34622	
Federal Point	1	Putnam	32031	
Fedhaven	1	Polk	33854	
Felda	1	Hendry	33930	
Felicia	1	Citrus	32642	
Felkel	1	Leon		
Fellowship	1	Marion	32670	
Fellowship Park	1	Clay		
Fellsmere	1	Indian River	32948	
Fenholloway	1	Taylor	32347	
Fernandina Beach	1	Nassau	32034	
Fern Crest Village	1	Broward	33314	
Ferndale	1	Lake	34729	
Fern Park	1	Seminole	32730	
Ferry Pass	1	Escambia	32514	
Fessenden	1	Marion		
Festus	1	Jefferson	32344	
Fidelis	1	Santa Rosa	32565	
Fiftone	1	Duval		
Fifty Seventh Avenue	1	Manatee	34282	
Fincher	1	Jefferson		
Fish Creek	1	Taylor		
Fisher Corner	1	Calhoun		
Fisher Island	1	Miami-Dade	33139	
FishHawk	1	Hillsborough		
Fish Lake	1	Osceola	32741	
Fivay	1	Pasco		
Fivay Junction	1	Pasco		
Five Points	1	Brevard	32922	
Five Points	1	Columbia	32055	
Flagami	1	Miami-Dade		
Flagler	1	Miami-Dade	33136	
Flagler	1	Monroe	33040	
Flagler Beach	2	Flagler, Volusia	32136	
Flagler Estates	2	Flagler, St. Johns		
Flamingo	1	Monroe	33034	
Flamingo	1	Orange		
Flamingo Bay	1	Lee	33956	
Flamingo Village	1	Broward		
Fleming Heights	1	Orange	32808	
Fleming Island	1	Clay		
Flemington	1	Marion	32686	
Fletcher	1	Hillsborough	33695	
Flora	1	Hillsborough		
Florahome	1	Putnam	32140	
Floral Bluff	1	Duval	32211	
Floral City	1	Citrus	34436	
Floral Park	1	Palm Beach	33460	
Flor-a-mar	1	Pasco		
Flordale	1	Duval	32209	
Florence	1	Gadsden		
Florence Villa	1	Polk	33881	
Floresta	1	Palm Beach	33432	
Floresta Estates	1	Broward	33441	
Florida Beach	1	Bay	32401	
Florida City	1	Miami-Dade	33034	
Florida Gardens	1	Palm Beach	33460	
Florida Hills	1	Lake		
Floridale	1	Santa Rosa		
Floridana Beach	1	Brevard	32951	
Florida Ridge	1	Indian River	32960	
Florida Southern College	1	Polk	33802	
Florida State Prison	1	Bradford	32091	
Florida State University	1	Leon	32306	
Floridatown	1	Santa Rosa		
Florida Tribe of Eastern Creek	2	Calhoun, Walton		
Floridiana	1	Brevard		
Floritan	1	Polk		
Florosa	1	Okaloosa	32569	
Flower Bluff	1	Levy	32626	
Flowersville	1	Walton	32567	
Fluffy Landing	1	Walton		
Foley	1	Taylor		
Foley Junction	1	Taylor		
Footman	1	Brevard	32952	
Fordville	1	Sarasota		
Forest City	1	Seminole	32714	
Forest Corners	1	Marion		
Forest Grove	1	Alachua	32615	
Forest Heights	1	Leon		
Forest Highlands	1	Walton		
Forest Hills	1	Hillsborough	33612	
Forest Hills	1	Pasco	33589	
Forest Island Park	1	Lee		
Forest Lakes	1	Sarasota	33582	
Forest Ridge	1	Alachua	32601	
Formosa	1	Orange		
Forrest Beach	1	Walton		
Forrest Hills	1	Volusia	32074	
Fort Barrancas	1	Escambia	32508	
Fort Basinger	1	Highlands	33428	
Fort Braden	1	Leon		
Fort Caroline	1	Duval		
Fort Caroline Club Estates	1	Duval	32211	
Fort Caroline National Memorial	1	Duval	32225	
Fort Centre	1	Glades		
Fort Denaud	1	Hendry		
Fort De Soto	1	Pinellas		
Fort Drum	1	Okeechobee	33472	
Fort Florida	1	Volusia		
Fort Gadsden	1	Franklin		
Fort Gates	1	Putnam		
Fort George	1	Duval		
Fort George Island	1	Duval	32226	
Fort Green	1	Hardee	33834	
Fort Green Springs	1	Hardee	33834	
Fort Hamer	1	Manatee		
Fort Jefferson	1	Monroe		
Fort Jefferson National Monument	1	Monroe	33040	
Fort King	1	Marion		
Fort King Acres	1	Pasco		
Fort Kissimmee	1	Okeechobee		
Fort Lauderdale	1	Broward	33301	51
Fort Lauderdale Beach	1	Broward		
Fort Lonesome	1	Hillsborough	33547	
Fort McCoy	1	Marion	32134	
Fort McRee	1	Escambia		
Fort Mason	1	Lake		
Fort Matanzas	1	St. Johns		
Fort Matanzas National Monument	1	St. Johns	32084	
Fort Meade	1	Polk	33841	
Fort Myers	1	Lee	33901	19
Fort Myers Beach	1	Lee	33931	
Fort Myers Shores	1	Lee	33905	
Fort Myers Southeast	1	Lee	33901	
Fort Myers Southwest	1	Lee	33901	
Fort Myers Villas	1	Lee	33901	
Fort Ogden	1	DeSoto	33842	
Fort Pickens	1	Escambia		
Fort Pierce	1	St. Lucie	34945	88
Fort Pierce Beach	1	St. Lucie	33450	
Fort Pierce Indian Reservation	1	St. Lucie		
Fort Pierce North	1	St. Lucie	33452	
Fort Pierce Shores	1	St. Lucie	33450	
Fort Pierce South	1	St. Lucie		
Fort Redoubt	1	Escambia		
Fort Reed	1	Seminole		
Fort San Carlos	1	Escambia		
Fort Taylor	1	Monroe	33040	
Fort Union	1	Suwannee	32060	
Fort Walton Beach	1	Okaloosa	32548	
Fort White	1	Columbia	32038	
Fortymile Bend	1	Miami-Dade		
Forty Ninth Street	1	Pinellas	33707	
Fountain	1	Bay	32438	
Fontainebleau	1	Miami-Dade		
Fountain Heights	1	Polk	33803	
Four Corners	4	Lake, Orange, Osceola, Polk		
Four Corners	1	Pinellas		
Four Mile Village	1	Walton	32459	
Four Points	1	Leon		
Four Points	1	Palm Beach	33406	
Fowler's Bluff	1	Levy		
Foxleigh	1	Manatee		
Fox Town	1	Polk		
Francis	1	Putnam	32077	
Franjo	1	Miami-Dade		
Franklin	1	Franklin		
Franklin Park	1	Broward		
Franklin Park	1	Lee		
Franklintown	1	Nassau	32034	
Franwood Pines	1	Palm Beach	33444	
Frazer	1	Jackson		
Frederick	1	Martin		
Freemanville	1	Volusia		
Freemont	1	Gadsden		
Freeport	1	Walton	32439	
Fremd Village-Padgett Island	1	Palm Beach		
Frink	1	Calhoun	32430	
Frog City	1	Miami-Dade		
Frontenac	1	Brevard	32959	
Frontier	1	Collier	33934	
Frostproof	1	Polk	33843	
Fruit Cove	1	St. Johns	32223	
Fruit Cove-Switzerland	1	St. Johns		
Fruitland	1	Putnam	32012	
Fruitland Park	1	Lake	34731	
Fruitville	1	Sarasota	34278	
Fuller Heights	1	Polk	33860	
Fullers	1	Orange		
Fullerton	1	Volusia	32759	
Fullerville	1	Lake	32720	
Fulton	1	Duval	32207	
Fussels Corner	1	Polk	33823	

== See also ==
- Florida
- List of municipalities in Florida
- List of former municipalities in Florida
- List of counties in Florida
- List of census-designated places in Florida
