= Nature Coast State Trail =

Rail trail in Florida, United States

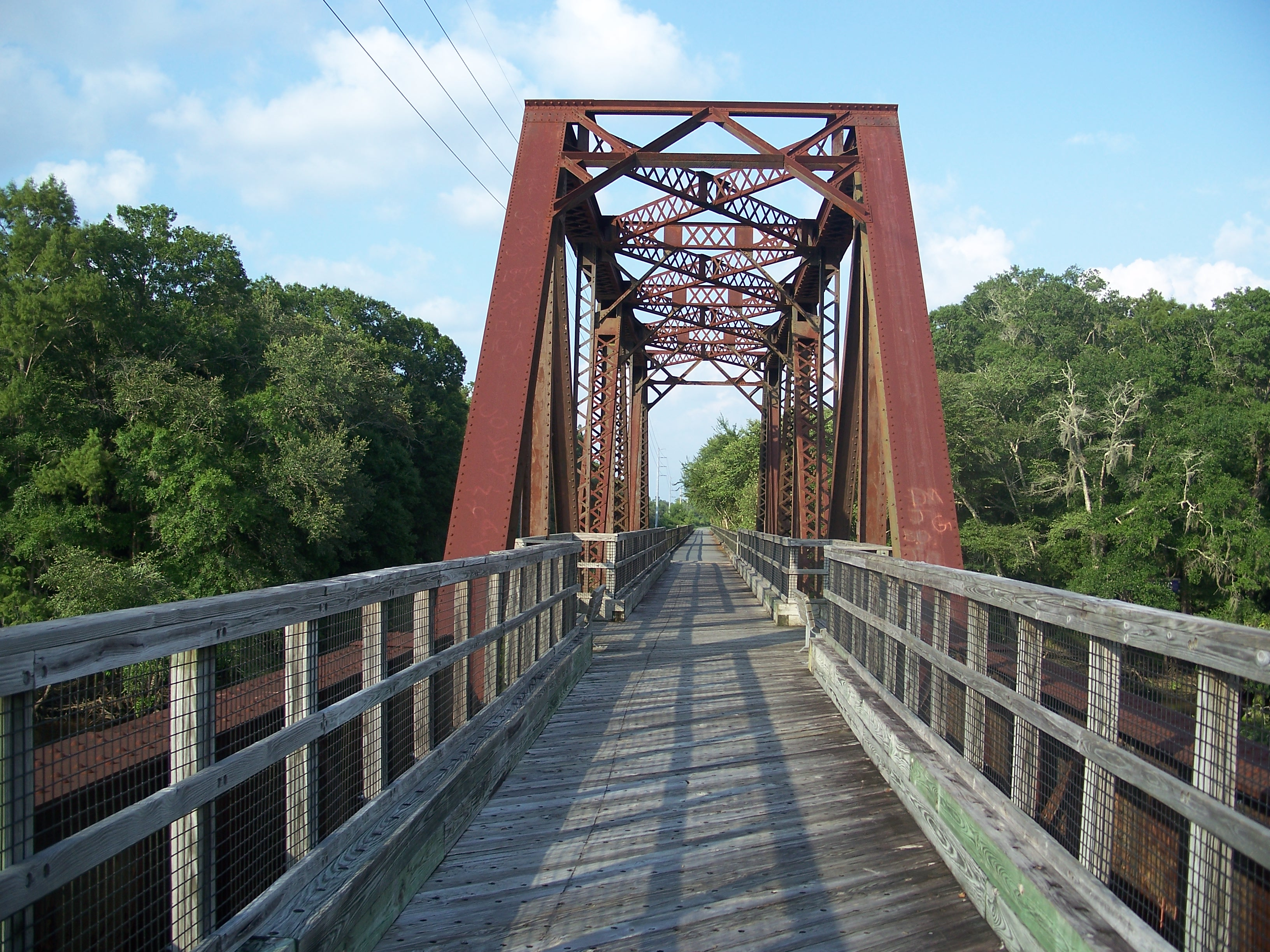
- This truss bridge across the Suwannee River is one of the highlights of the trail.
- Length: 31.7 mi (51.0 km)
- Location: Dixie, Gilchrist, and Levy counties, Florida, USA
- Trailheads: Chiefland; 29.4748°N 82.8583°W; Cross City; 29.6367°N 83.1285°W; Fanning Springs; 29.5915°N 82.9301°W; Old Town; 29.6033°N 82.9832°W; Trenton; 29.6161°N 82.8186°W
- Use: Hiking/Biking/Horses/Rollerblading
- Season: Year round
- Hazards: Severe weather, swampland

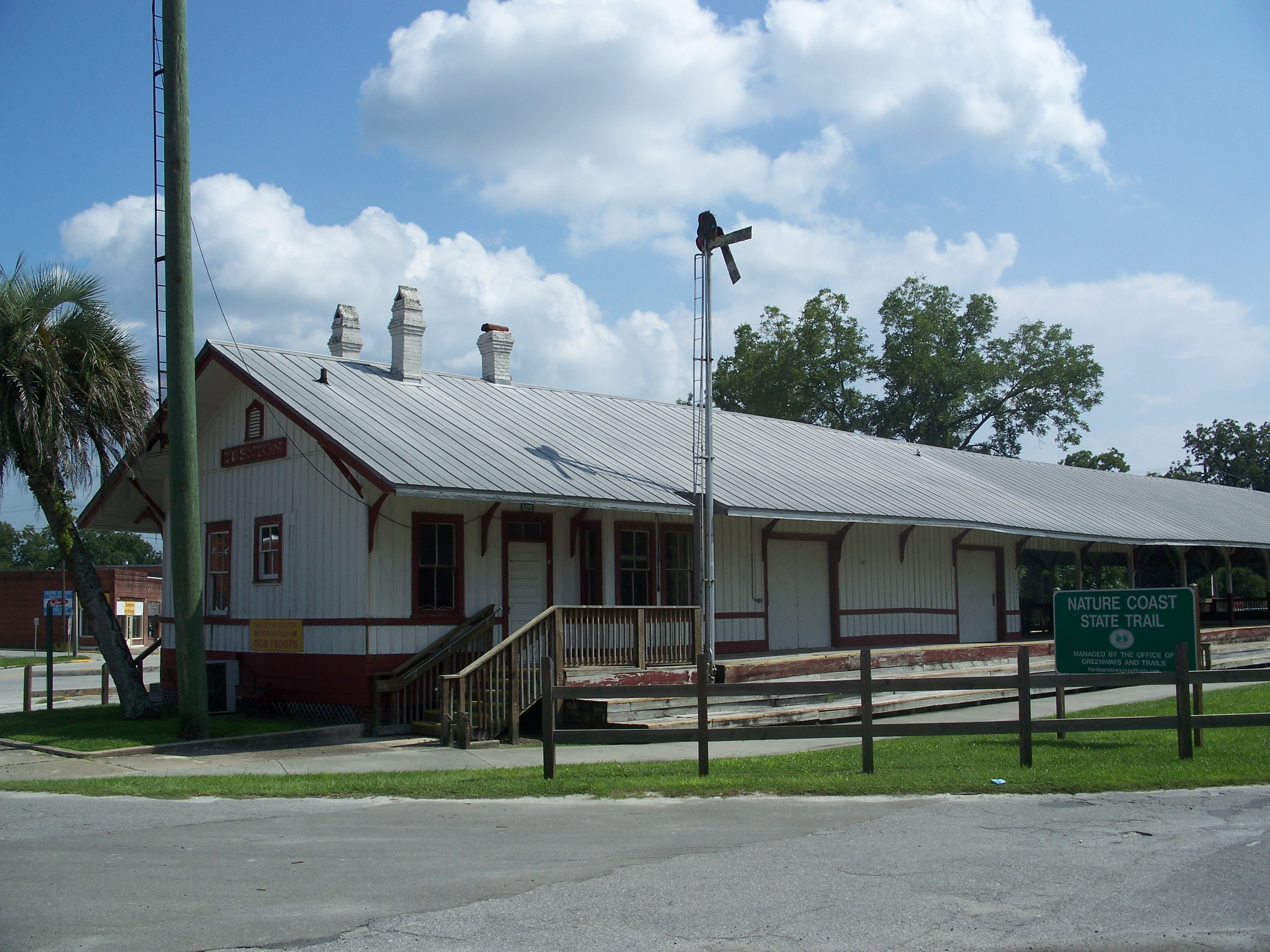
Historic Trenton Depot on the Nature Trail.

The Nature Coast State Trail (NCST) is a 31.7-mile long segment of Florida's Statewide System of Greenways and Trails System built along abandoned railroad tracks, and designated by the U.S. Department of the Interior as a National Recreation Trail. It has two primary sections following unused rail lines that were built by the Atlantic Coast Line Railroad. It includes historic sites such as a 1902 train trestle bridge over the Suwannee River near Old Town and train stations in Trenton, Cross City, and Chiefland. At Wilcox Junction abandoned rail tracks cross and connect with several communities. The trail is available to hikers, cyclists, and horse riders.

== History ==
Florida has many abandoned railway tracks in the Suwannee River Valley. In the early 1900s freight and passenger steamships were replaced by trains that carried crops and timber and also made passenger stops in small towns such as Chiefland, Cross City, and Trenton. These lines consisted of the Thomasville—Dunnellon Line and the Jacksonville—Wilcox Line. The Nature Coast Trail follows this historic route. The 31.7 miles of the Nature Coast State Trail connects several counties and five communities (Cross City, Trenton, Fanning Springs Old Town and Chiefland).

In 2010, then-Florida governor Charlie Crist approved the purchase of a 9.33-mile corridor, known as the Trenton–Newberry Rail Trail. This will extend the 31.7-mile NCST managed by the Florida Department of Environmental Protection.

Nearby land and water resources exist in the vicinity of the Nature Coast State Trail.

- Suwannee River
- Fanning Springs
- Big Bend Seagrasses Aquatic Preserve
- Manatee Springs State Park
- "City of Hawkinsville" Underwater Archaeological Preserve
- Andrews Wildlife Management Area
- Cedar Key Scrub State Reserve
- Waccasassa Bay State Preserve
- Cedar Keys National Wildlife Refuge
- Lower Suwannee National Wildlife Refuge
- Jena Wildlife Management Area
- Gulf Hammock Wildlife Management Area
- Goethe State Forest
- Fanning Springs State Recreation Area
- Andrews Wildlife Management Area
- Suwannee River Wilderness Trail
- Withlacoochee State Trail
