= List of former municipalities in Florida =

The following incorporated municipalities formerly existed in the U.S. state of Florida, but have been disincorporated.

== A ==
- Altoona (Lake County): disincorporated 1899
- Anthony (Marion County): disincorporated 1931
- Aucilla (Jefferson County): disincorporated 1915
- Aurantia (Brevard County)

== B ==
- Bayview (Bay County): disincorporated 1977
- Bayview (Brevard County): disincorporated 1925 (annexed by Titusville)
- Belle Vista Beach (Pinellas County): disincorporated 1957 (merged with St. Petersburg Beach)
- Bithlo (Orange County): disincorporated 1977
- Bluff Springs (Escambia County): disincorporated 1895
- Boca Ciega (Pinellas County): disincorporated 1955 (merged with Treasure Island)
- Boulogne (Nassau County): disincorporated 1963
- Bradley (Polk County)
- Broward Gardens (Broward County): disincorporated 1955
- Buena Vista (Miami-Dade County): disincorporated 1925 (annexed by Miami)

== C ==
- Cedar Grove (Bay County): disincorporated 2008
- Charlotte Harbor (Charlotte County): disincorporated 1927
- Charlotte-on-the-Bay (Charlotte County): disincorporated 1963
- Citra (Marion County): disincorporated 1931
- Cleveland (Charlotte County): disincorporated 1949
- Coastal City (Nassau County): disincorporated 1951
- Coconut Grove (Miami-Dade County): disincorporated 1925 (annexed by Miami)
- Columbus (Suwannee County)
- Coronado Beach (Volusia County): disincorporated 1946 (merged with New Smyrna Beach)
- Cortez (Manatee County): disincorporated 1929
- Cypress (Jackson County)

== D ==
- Daytona (Volusia County): disincorporated 1925 (merged with Daytona Beach)
- DeLeon Springs (Volusia County): disincorporated 1919
- Delray (Palm Beach County): disincorporated 1927 (merged with Delray Beach)
- DeSoto City (Highlands County)
- Don Ce-Sar Place (Pinellas County): disincorporated 1957 (merged with St. Petersburg Beach)

== E ==
- East Fort Myers (Lee County)
- East Millville (Bay County): disincorporated by 1919 (merged with Millville)
- East Tampa (Hillsborough County): disincorporated 1925 (annexed by Tampa)
- Eau Gallie (Brevard County): disincorporated 1969 (merged with Melbourne)
- Eau Gallie Beach (Brevard County): disincorporated 1943
- Edgewater Gulf Beach (Bay County): disincorporated 1970 (merged with Panama City Beach)
- Elfers (Pasco County): disincorporated 1933
- Ellenton (Manatee County): disincorporated 1931
- Englewood (Sarasota County): disincorporated 1929
- Enterprise (Volusia County): disincorporated 1895
- Estero (Lee County): disincorporated 1907; incorporated in 2014 as the Village of Estero

== F ==
- Fairfield (Duval County): disincorporated 1887 (annexed by Jacksonville)
- Federal Point (Putnam County): disincorporated 1935
- Fernandina (Nassau County): disincorporated 1951 (merged with Fernandina Beach)
- Fern Crest Village (Broward County): disincorporated 1970 (later annexed by Davie)
- Fivay (Pasco County)
- Floral City (Citrus County): disincorporated 1911
- Florence Villa (Polk County): disincorporated 1925 (annexed by Winter Haven)
- Forest Park (Hillsborough County): disincorporated 1925
- Fort Brooke (Hillsborough County): disincorporated 1907 (annexed by Tampa)
- Fort Ogden (DeSoto County): disincorporated 1933

== G ==
- Genoa (Hamilton County): disincorporated 1901
- Glendale (Walton County)
- Goldsboro (Seminole County): disincorporated 1911 (annexed by Sanford)
- Golfview (Palm Beach County): disincorporated 1997
- Gulf Beach (Bay County): disincorporated 1955

== H ==
- Hacienda Village (Broward County): disincorporated 1984 (annexed by Davie)
- Hastings (St. Johns County): disincorporated 2018
- Hernando (Citrus County): disincorporated 1973
- Highlands City (Polk County): disincorporated 1929
- Hollywood Ridge Farms (Broward County): disincorporated 1970 (annexed by Pembroke Park)
- Holt (Okaloosa County): disincorporated 1919
- Hosford (Liberty County): disincorporated 1915

== I ==
- Indian Beach (Sarasota County): disincorporated 1925 (annexed by Sarasota)
- Indian River City (Brevard County): disincorporated 1929
- Indiantown (Martin County): disincorporated 1933
- Iola (Gulf County)
- Islandia (Miami-Dade County): disincorporated 2012

== J ==
- Jensen (Martin County): disincorporated 1933
- Julia (Bay County): disincorporated 1955

== K ==
- Kathleen (Polk County): disincorporated 1929

== L ==
- Lakeview (Broward County): disincorporated 1969
- LaVilla (Duval County): disincorporated 1887 (annexed by Jacksonville)
- Lecanto (Citrus County): disincorporated 1933
- Lloyd (Jefferson County): disincorporated 1913
- Long Beach Resort (Bay County): disincorporated 1970 (merged with Panama City Beach)

== M ==
- Magnolia (Wakulla County)
- Manatee (Manatee County): disincorporated 1944 (merged with Bradenton)
- Mandarin (Duval County)
- Mayport (Duval County): disincorporated 1919
- Melrose (Alachua, Bradford, Clay, and Putnam Counties): disincorporated 1917
- Millville (Bay County): disincorporated 1925 (annexed by Panama City)
- Mims (Brevard County): disincorporated 1927
- Mission City (Volusia County): disincorporated 1931
- Molino (Escambia County): disincorporated 1933
- Montbrook (Levy County)
- Monte Vista (Lake County): disincorporated 2003
- Morriston (Levy County)
- Murray (Lee County)
- Murray Hill (Duval County): disincorporated 1925 (annexed by Jacksonville)

== N ==
- New Augustine (St. Johns County): disincorporated 1911 (annexed by St. Augustine)
- Newnansville (Alachua County)
- Newport (Wakulla County)
- North Key Largo Beach (Monroe County): disincorporated 2003
- North Miami (Miami-Dade County): disincorporated 1913 (merged with Miami)
- North Tampa (Hillsborough County): disincorporated 1887 (merged with Tampa)

== O ==
- Ochesee (Calhoun County): disincorporated 1847
- Ojus (Miami-Dade County): disincorporated 1935
- Ona (Hardee County)
- Orlo Vista (Orange County): disincorporated 1929
- Osteen (Volusia County): disincorporated 1931
- Oxford (Sumter County)
- Ozona (Pinellas County)

== P ==
- Painters Hill (Flagler County): disincorporated 1981
- Palatka Heights (Putnam County): disincorporated 1921 (annexed by Palatka)
- Palm City (Martin County): disincorporated 1937
- Pass-a-Grille Beach (Pinellas County): disincorporated 1957 (merged with St. Petersburg Beach)
- Pennsuco (Miami-Dade County)
- Perrine (Miami-Dade County): disincorporated 1949
- Pinecastle (Orange County)
- Playville (Bay County): disincorporated 1955
- Plumosus City (Palm Beach County): disincorporated 1959
- Pompano (Broward County): disincorporated 1947 (merged with Pompano Beach)
- Port Leon (Wakulla County) Briefly the county seat of Wakulla County. Abandoned after destruction by hurricane in 1843.
- Port Sewall (Martin County): disincorporated 1933
- Port Tampa (Hillsborough County): disincorporated 1961 (annexed by Tampa)

== S ==
- St. Andrews (Bay County): disincorporated 1925 (annexed by Panama City)
- St. James City (Lee County)
- St. Joseph (Gulf County)
- Salerno (Martin County): disincorporated 1935
- Sanford Heights (Seminole County): disincorporated 1911
- San Mateo City (Putnam County): disincorporated 1933
- Sarasota Heights (Sarasota County): disincorporated 1926 (merged with Sarasota)
- Scottsmoor (Brevard County)
- Seabreeze (Volusia County): disincorporated 1925 (merged with Daytona Beach)
- Senybal (Lee County)
- Seville (Volusia County)
- Shady Hills (Brevard County): disincorporated 1959
- Silver Bluff (Miami-Dade County): disincorporated 1925 (annexed by Miami)
- Sirmons (Madison County)
- South Eau Gallie (Brevard County): disincorporated 1925
- South Jacksonville (Duval County): disincorporated 1932 (annexed by Jacksonville)
- South Madeira Beach (Pinellas County): disincorporated 1951 (merged with Madeira Beach)
- Sulphur Springs Park (Hillsborough County): disincorporated 1947 (annexed by Tampa)
- Sumterville (Sumter County)
- Sunset Beach (Pinellas County): disincorporated 1955 (merged with Treasure Island)
- Sunshine Beach (Pinellas County): disincorporated 1955 (merged with Treasure Island)

== T ==
- Taft (Orange County): disincorporated 1933
- Trilby (Pasco County): disincorporated 1909; reincorporated from 1913 to 1935
- Tyler (Gilchrist County)

== U ==
- University Park (Palm Beach County): disincorporated 1971 (annexed by Boca Raton)

== V ==
- Vamo (Sarasota County): disincorporated 1927
- Verna (Manatee and Sarasota Counties): disincorporated 1927

== W ==
- Wabasso (Indian River County): disincorporated 1935
- Wade (Alachua County)
- Ward Ridge (Gulf County): disincorporated 1987 (annexed by Port St. Joe)
- Wellborn (Suwannee County): disincorporated 1931
- West Hollywood (Broward County): disincorporated 1963 (annexed by Hollywood)
- West Panama City Beach (Bay County): disincorporated 1970 (merged with Panama City Beach)
- West Tampa (Hillsborough County): disincorporated 1925 (annexed by Tampa)
- Whispering Hills Golf Estates (Brevard County): disincorporated 1963 (annexed by Titusville)
- Wimauma (Hillsborough County)

== Y ==
- Yalaha (Lake County): disincorporated 1937

== See also ==
- List of municipalities in Florida
