= Carl O. Drummond =

American politician

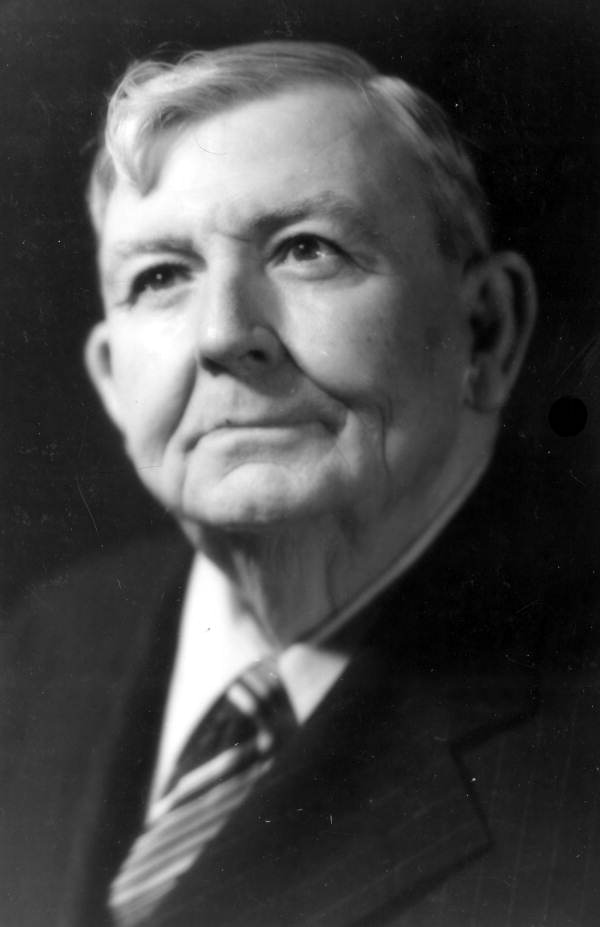
- Drummond in 1947

Member of the Florida House of Representatives from Gilchrist County
- In office 1947

Personal details
- Born: February 13, 1889 Alachua County, Florida, U.S.
- Died: January 19, 1948 (aged 58)
- Party: Democratic

Carl O. Drummond (February 13, 1889 – January 19, 1948) was an American politician. He served as a Democratic member of the Florida House of Representatives.

== Life and career ==
Drummond was born in a part of Alachua County, Florida that later become Gilchrist County.

Drummond served on the Trenton, Florida city council and represented Gilchrist County in the Florida House of Representatives in 1947.

== Death ==
Drummond died in Trenton on January 19, 1948, at the age of 58.
