= Trenton Church of Christ =

Historic church building in Trenton, Florida

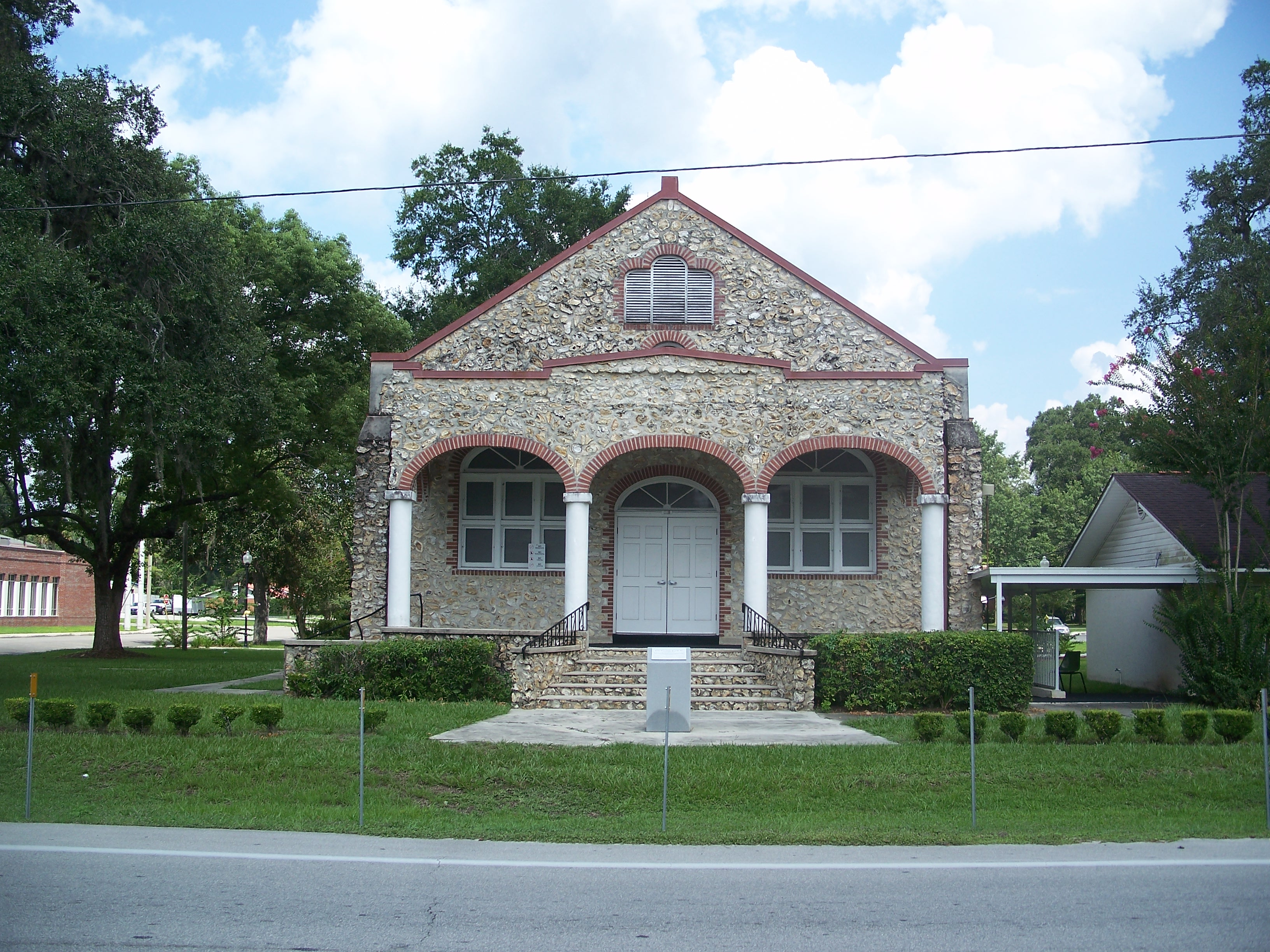
- Trenton Church of Christ
- Interactive map of the Trenton Church of Christ area

General information
- Location: S. Main St. at SE 1st Ave, Trenton, Florida, United States
- Coordinates: 29°36′44.7″N 82°49′5″W
- Completed: 1936
- Client: Gilchrist County

Technical details
- Structural system: Florida field limestone, rubble masonry, with brick quoins

Design and construction
- Engineer: Builder: Frank Beach

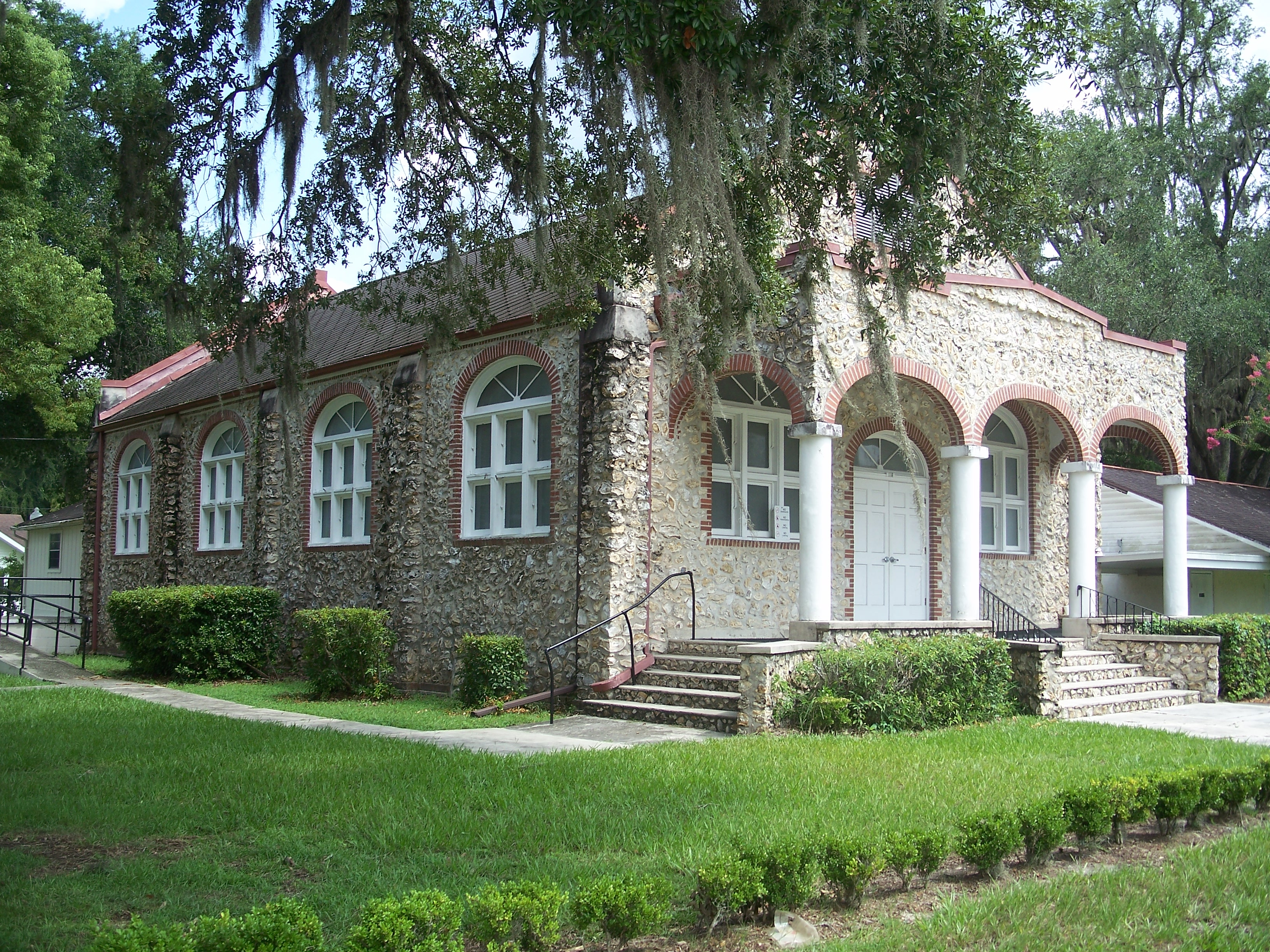
Another view

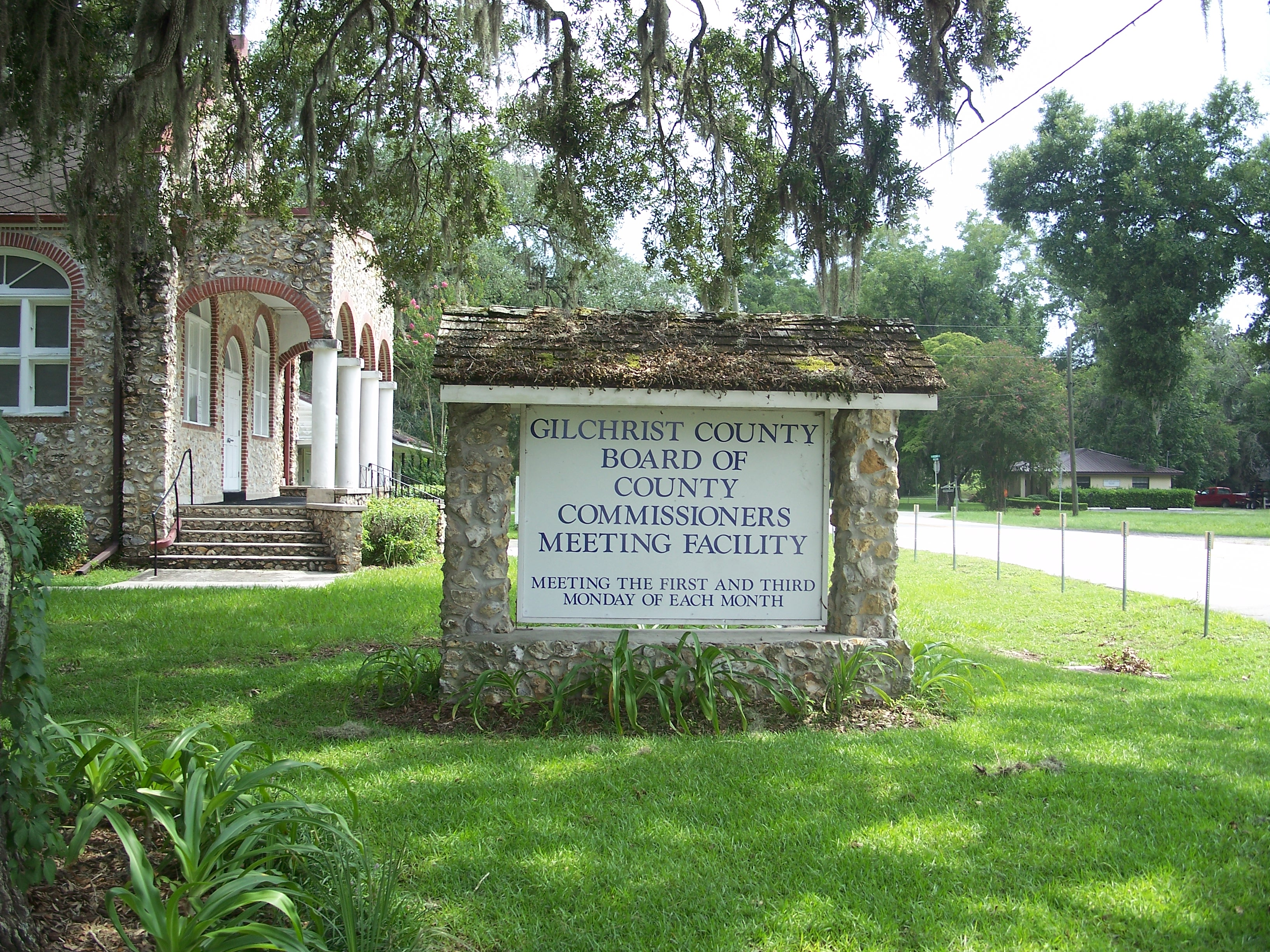
Current sign

The old Trenton Church of Christ is an historic one-story Church of Christ church building located on the southeast corner of South Main Street and Southeast 1st Avenue, just south of the Gilchrist County Courthouse, in Trenton, Gilchrist County, Florida. It was built in 1920 of "Florida field limestone, rubble masonry, with brick quoins at openings, arched windows, triple-arched entry porch," etc. Additions have been made to the rear and to the south. In 1989, the building was listed in A Guide to Florida's Historic Architecture, published by the University of Florida Press.

The congregation of the Trenton Church of Christ now meets at 502 Northeast 7th Street. This historic church building has been adapted for use for meetings of the Gilchrist County Board of County Commissioners.
