= Wilcox Junction, Florida =

Unincorporated community in Florida, U.S.

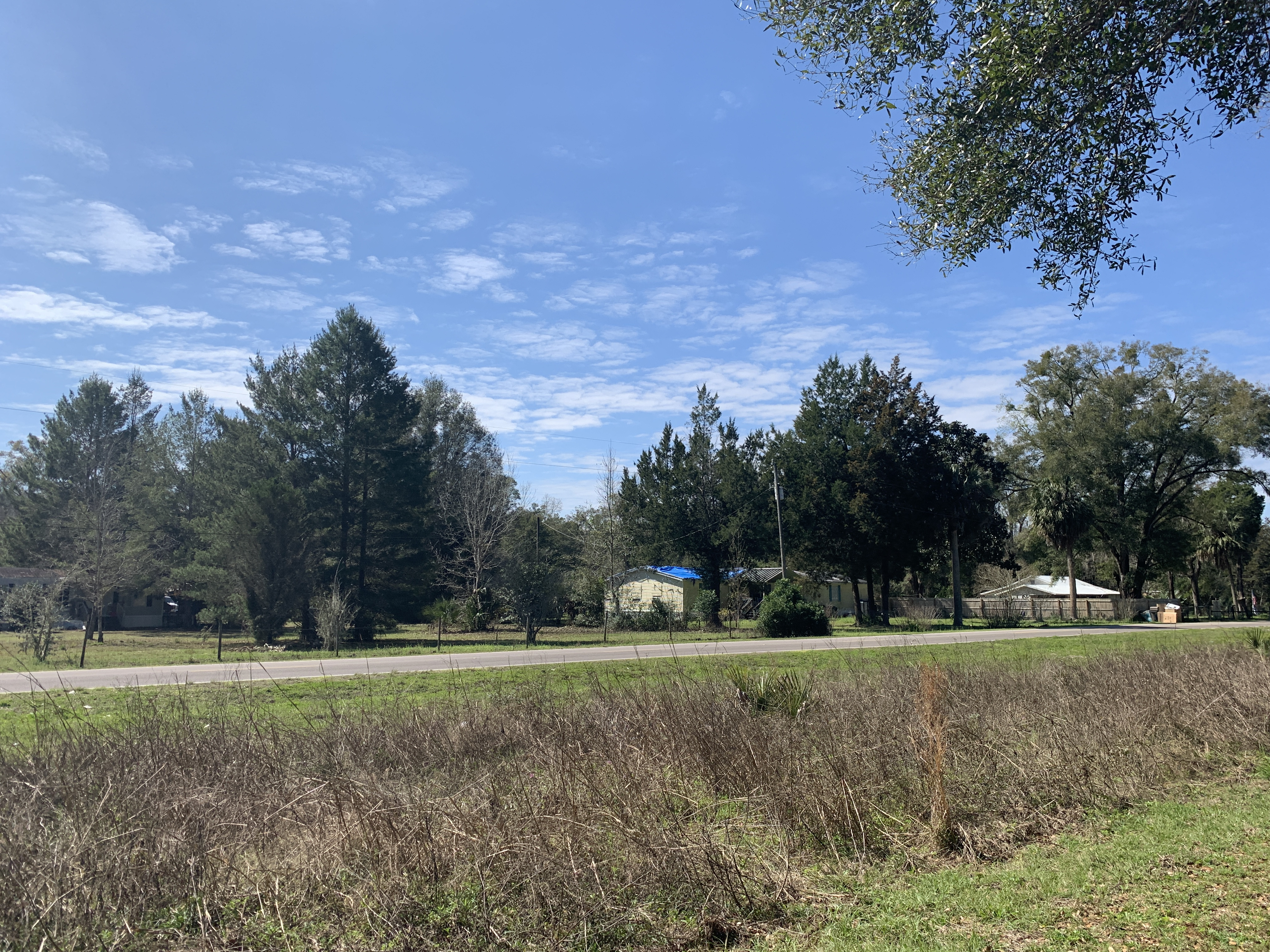
Wilcox Junction

Wilcox Junction is an unincorporated community in Gilchrist County, Florida, United States. It is located 1.4 miles (2.3 km) west of Wilcox, and 1.4 miles (2.3 km) northwest of Fanning Springs.

== Geography ==
Wilcox Junction is located at 29.612°N 82.94°W, and its elevation is 26 feet (7.9 m).

Wilcox Junction was the site of a former railroad wye built by the Atlantic Coast Line Railroad. The lines at this junction consisted of the Thomasville—Dunnellon Line and the Jacksonville—Wilcox Line. Today, all three legs of this wye are used by the Nature Coast State Trail.
