= Foxleigh =

Foxleigh may refer to:

- Foxleigh coal mine in Queensland, Australia
- Foxleigh, Florida, an unincorporated area in Florida
