= Spring Ridge =

Spring Ridge may refer to the following places:

- Spring Ridge, Florida, a census-designated place in Gilchrist County, Florida, United States
- Spring Ridge, Louisiana, an unincorporated community in Caddo Parish, Louisiana, United States
- Spring Ridge, Pennsylvania, a census-designated place in Spring Township, Berks County, Pennsylvania, United States
- Spring Ridge, New South Wales, a town in New South Wales, Australia

== See also ==
- Spring Ridge Academy, a juvenile boarding school for teenaged girls in Spring Valley, Arizona
- Spring Ridge Baptist Church, a historic church in Enterprise, Louisiana
- Spring Ridge Middle School, a middle school in St. Mary's County, Maryland
