= Spring Ridge, Florida =

- Census-designated place
- Location within Florida Location within the United States
- Coordinates: 29°49′19″N 82°43′28″W
- Country: United States
- State: Florida
- County: Gilchrist

Area
  - Total: 3.21 sq mi (8.32 km^{2})
  - Land: 3.21 sq mi (8.32 km^{2})
  - Water: 0 sq mi (0.00 km^{2})
- Elevation: 56 ft (17 m)

Population (2020)
  - Total: 442
  - Density: 137.6/sq mi (53.13/km^{2})
- Time zone: UTC-5 (Eastern (EST))
  - Summer (DST): UTC-4 (EDT)
- ZIP code: 32643
- Area code: 352
- FIPS code: 12-68435
- GNIS feature ID: 2628533

Spring Ridge is an unincorporated community and census-designated place (CDP) in Gilchrist County, Florida, United States. The population was 442 at the 2020 census, up from 398 at the 2010 census. It is part of the Gainesville, Florida Metropolitan Statistical Area.

== Geography ==
Spring Ridge is located in northeastern Gilchrist County, to the east of Florida State Road 47 and south of the Santa Fe River. It is 8 miles (13 km) west of High Springs and 16 miles (26 km) northeast of Trenton, the Gilchrist County seat. According to the United States Census Bureau, the CDP has an area of 3.2 square miles (8.3 km^{2}), all land.

== Demographics ==
Historical population
| Census | Pop. | Note | %± |
|---|---|---|---|
| 2010 | 398 | | — |
| 2020 | 442 | | 11.1% |
U.S. Decennial Census

Spring Ridge first appeared as a census designated place in the 2010 U.S. census.
