= Tyler, Florida =

Unincorporated community in Florida, U.S.

Tyler is an unincorporated community in Gilchrist County, Florida, United States. It was located approximately 5 miles (8.0 km) northeast of Trenton.

== Geography ==
Tyler is located at 29.651°N 82.764°W, its elevation 85 feet (26 m).
