= Fanning Springs State Park =

State park in Florida, United States

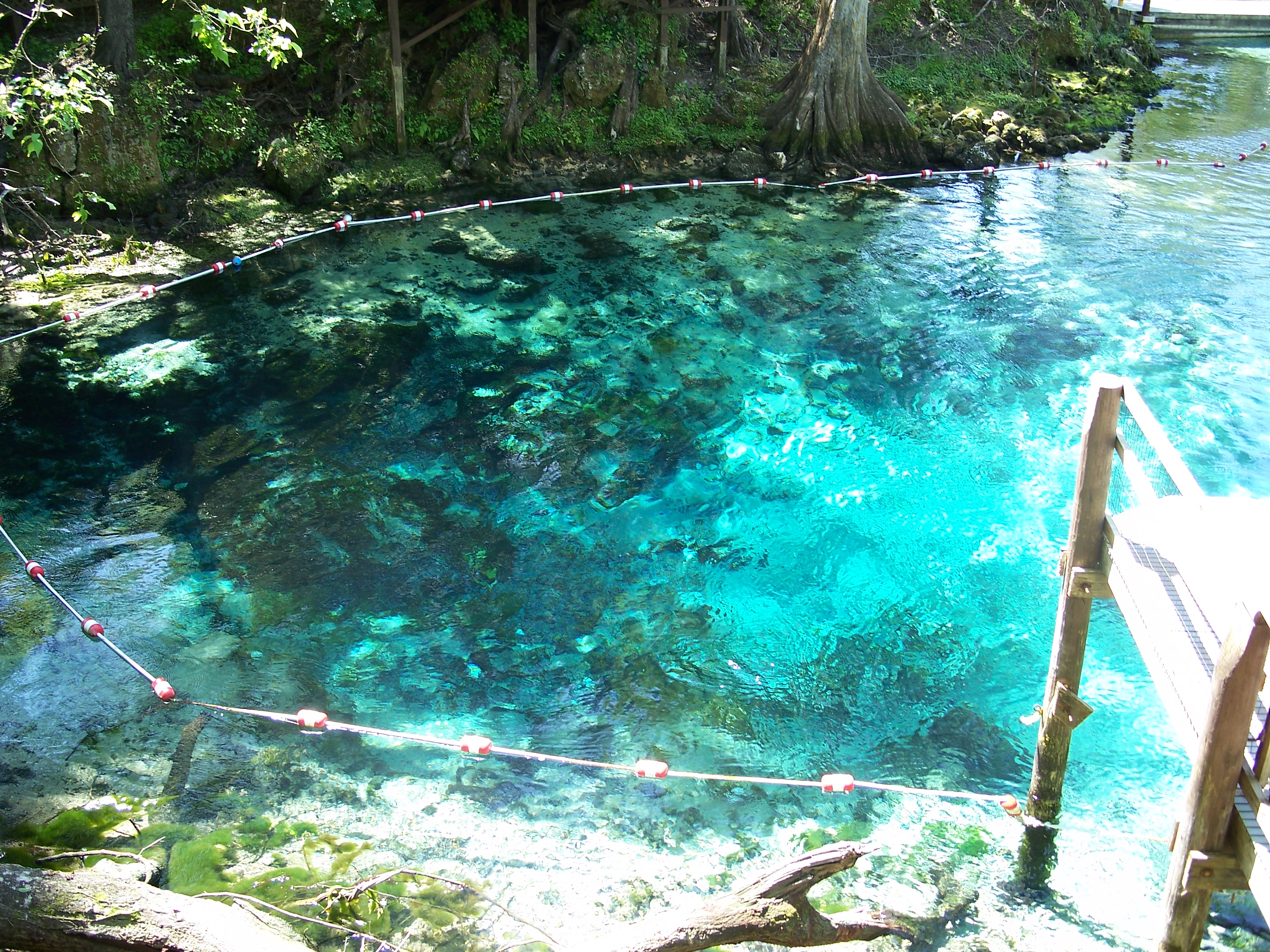
- A view down into the spring

- Location within Florida Location within the United States
- Interactive map of Fanning Springs State Park
- Location: Levy County, Florida, USA
- Nearest city: Fanning Springs, Florida
- Coordinates: 29°35′11″N 82°56′4″W
- Area: 200 acres (0.81 km^{2})
- Governing body: Florida Department of Environmental Protection

Fanning Springs State Park is a Florida State Park, located on US 19/98 in the town of Fanning Springs. It contains one of the state's 33 first magnitude springs. As of 2008, decreased water emission levels at the springs technically requalify the first magnitude status as "historical first magnitude."

The original occupants of the land were native aborigines, "paleo-Indian people", beginning 14,000 years ago, and several of sites previously occupied by them have been located within the park.

The area has been used for recreation, and in 1993 the state acquired the park. The Florida Department of Environmental Protection took over care of the park in 1997.

The Nature Coast State Trail, which follows abandoned railway lines, has a junction at Fanning Springs near the state park.

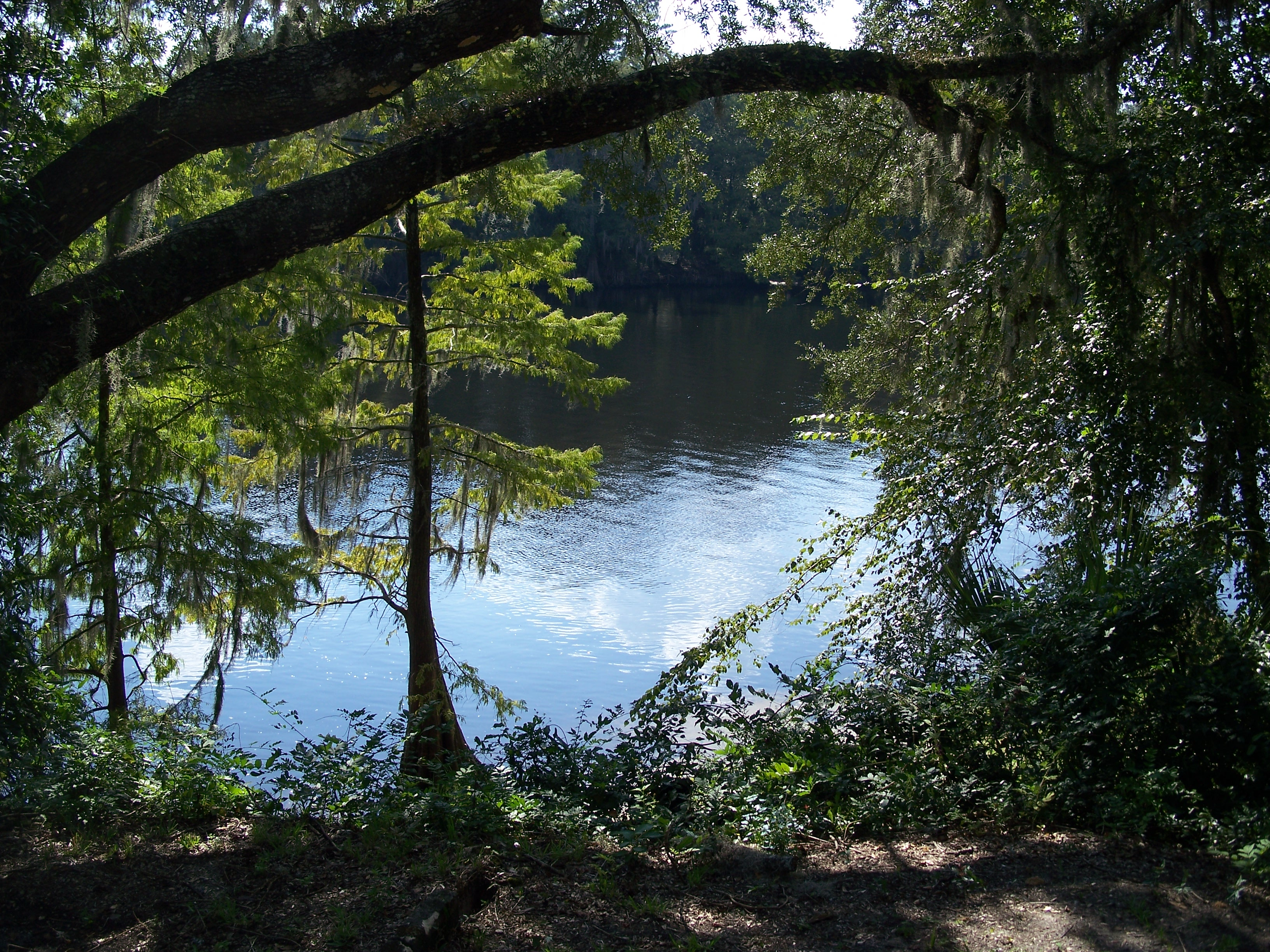
Suwannee River from the park

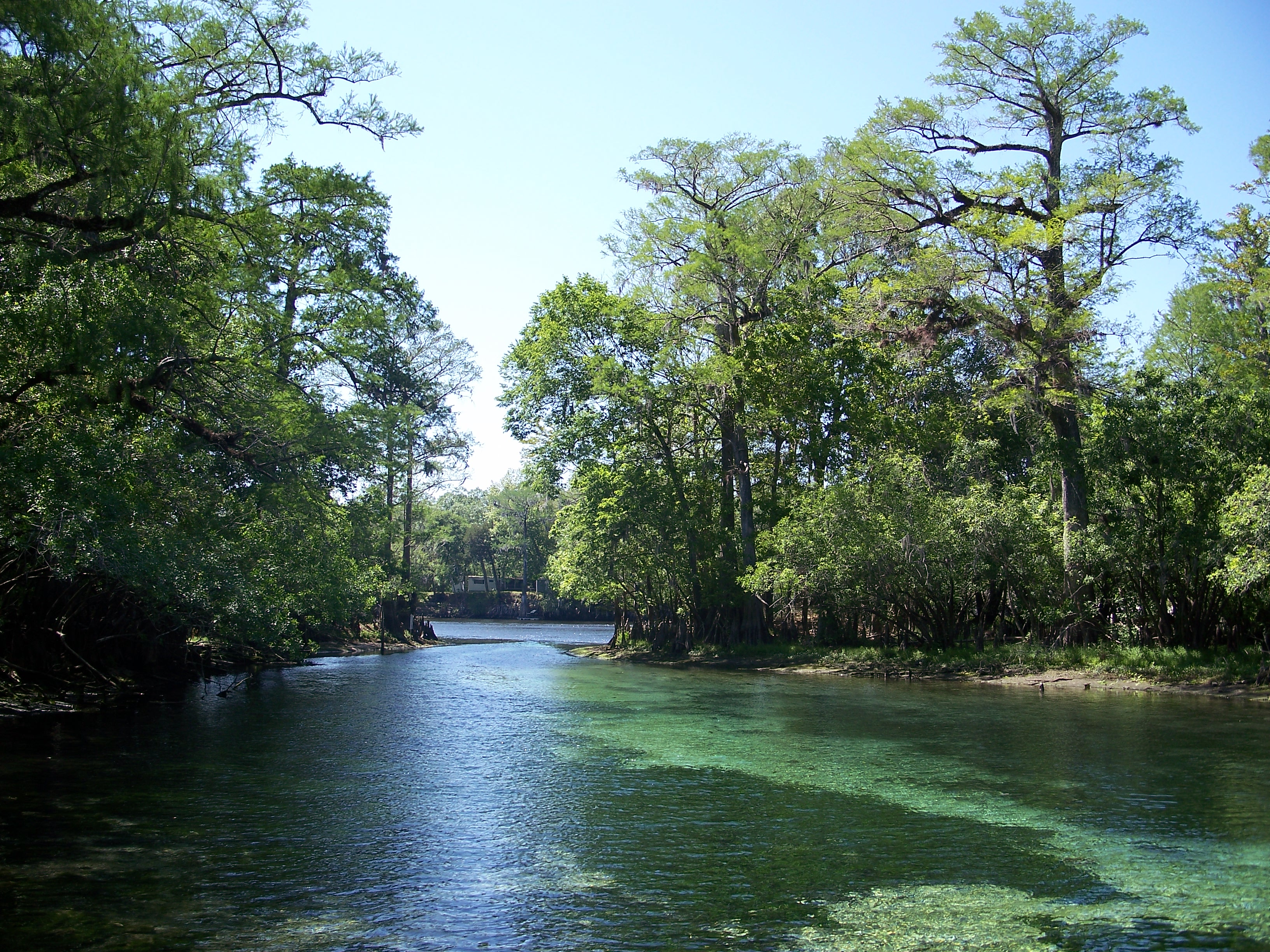
Springs outlet

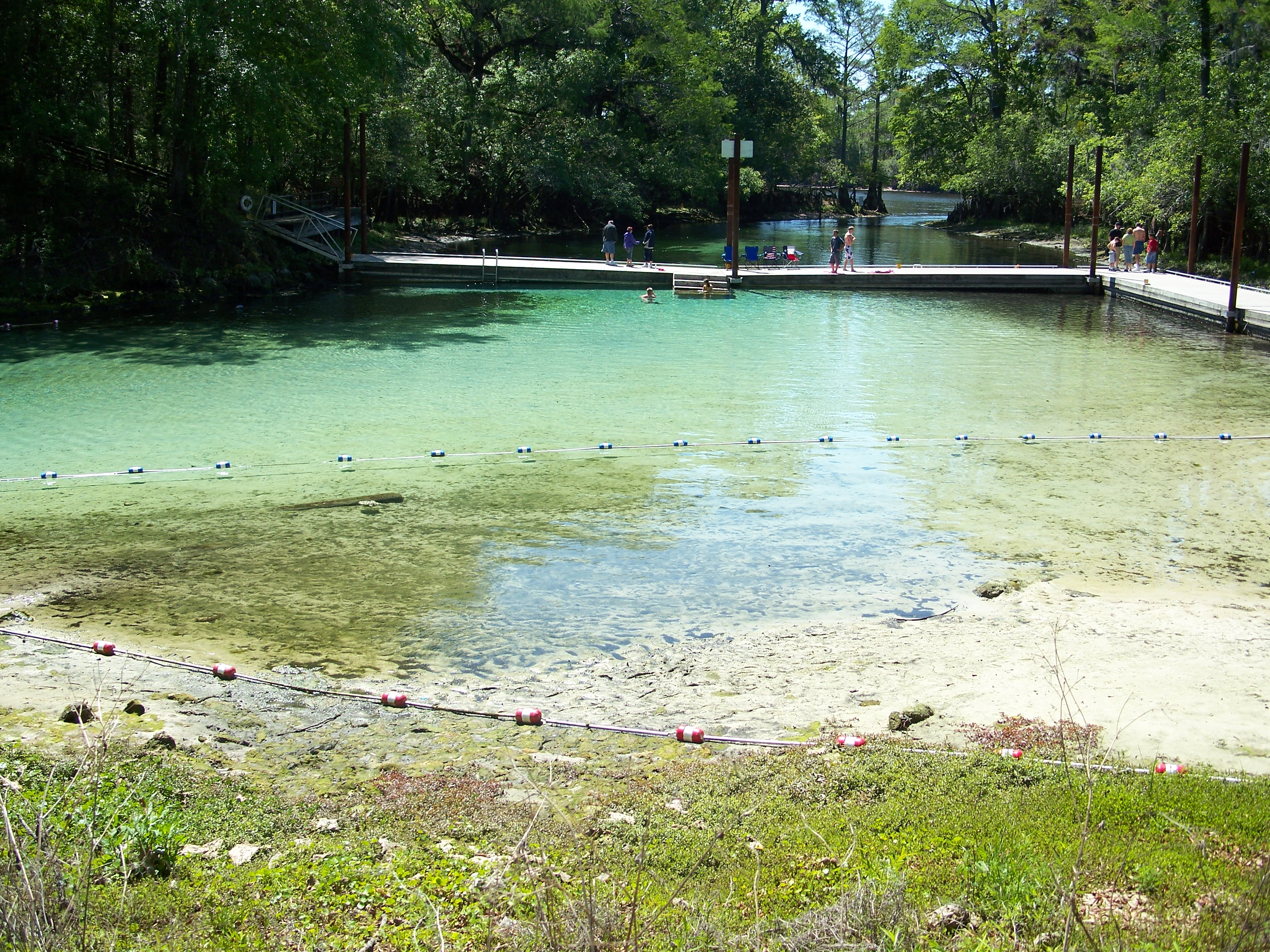
Park pool

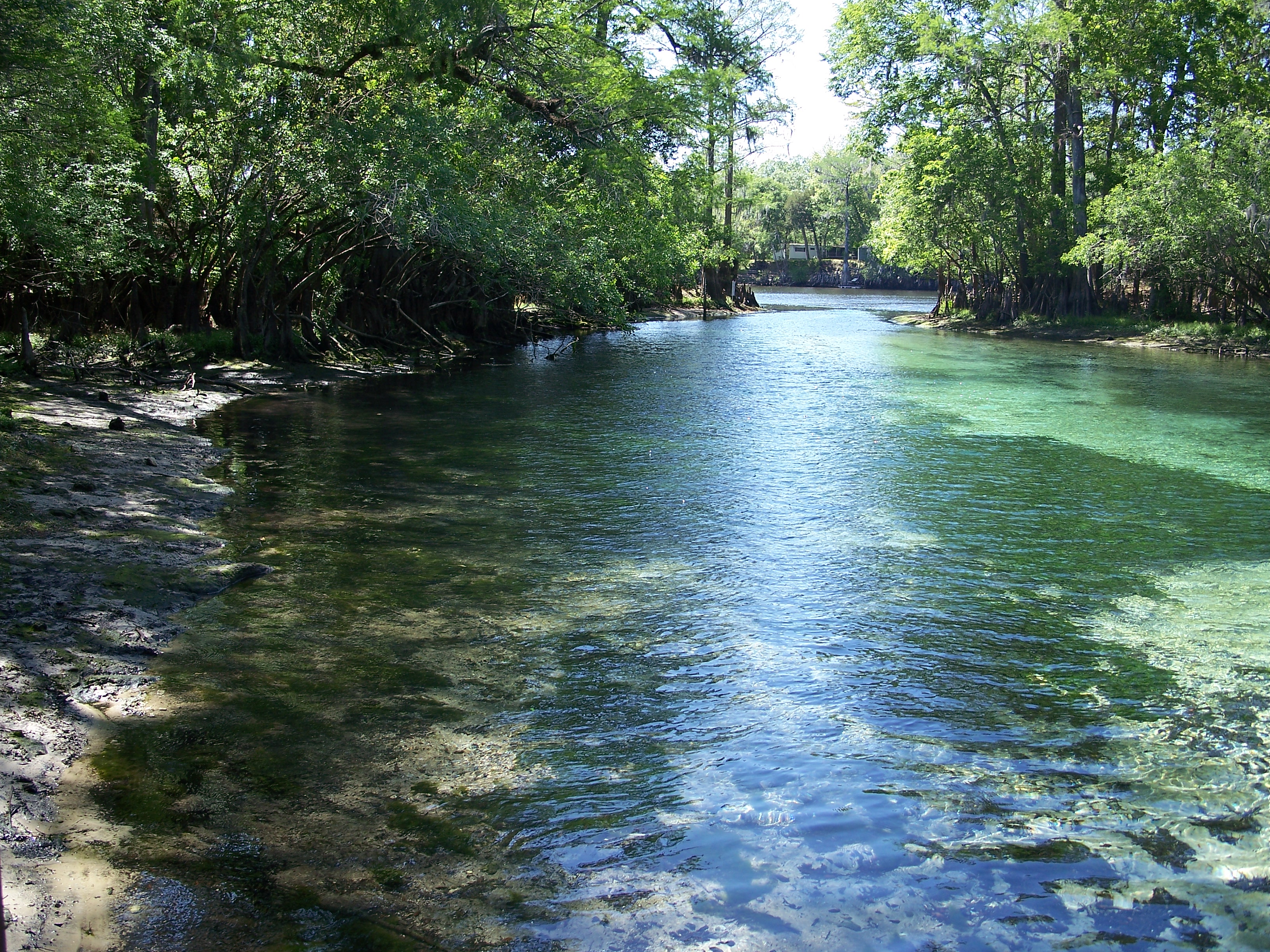
Stream from the springs feeding the Suwannee River
