= Little Lake City, Florida =

Unincorporated community in Florida, U.S.

Little Lake City is an unincorporated community in Gilchrist County, Florida, United States. It is located on the Suwannee River, approximately 5 miles (8.0 km) northwest of Bell.

== Geography ==
Little Lake City is located at 29.826°N 82.892°W at an elevation of 46 feet (14 m).
