= Fivay, Florida =

Fivay
- Human settlement
- Location in Florida
- Coordinates: 28°19′52″N 82°39′58″W
- Country: United States of America
- State: Florida
- County: Pasco
- Time zone: UTC-5 (Eastern (EST))
  - Summer (DST): UTC-4 (EDT)

Fivay was a settlement in Florida, midway between present-day Land O’ Lakes and Hudson.

Fivay existed as a company town for a lumber mill for less than a decade, and it started out being known as Five A’s. Its designation came from the owners of the sawmill, whose names all started with “A.” Martin Amorous, Preston Arkwright, Henry Atkinson, Gordon Abbott, and Charles Ayer.

== See also ==
- List of former municipalities in Florida
- List of ghost towns in Florida
- List of places in Florida: F
