= Neals, Florida =

Neals was a siding of the Seaboard Coast Line Railroad in Gilchrist County, Florida, United States. It is located approximately 2 miles (3.2 km) east of Craggs.

Today it is home to the Bell Ridge Longleaf Wildlife and Environmental Area.

== Geography ==
Neals is located at 29.769°N 82.713°W, its elevation 66 feet (20 m).
