= Gilchrist County Courthouse =

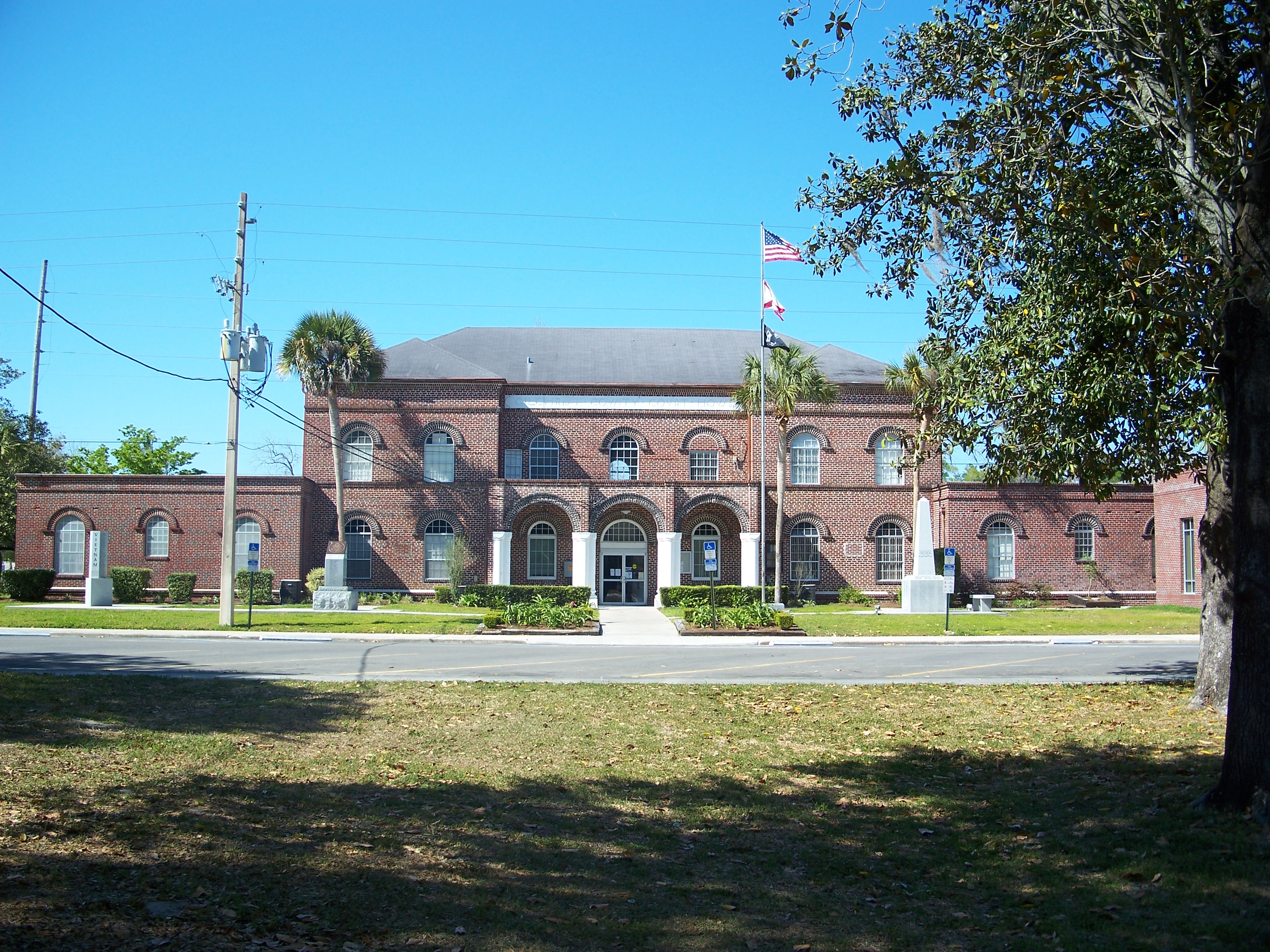
- Gilchrist County Courthouse
- Interactive map of the Gilchrist County Courthouse area

General information
- Location: 112 S Main St., Trenton, Florida, United States
- Coordinates: 29.61297°N 82.81761°W
- Completed: 1933, remodeled and expanded 1965
- Client: Gilchrist County

Technical details
- Structural system: brick

Design and construction
- Architects: Smith, Holborn, and Dozier of Jacksonville,
- Engineer: Builder: unknown

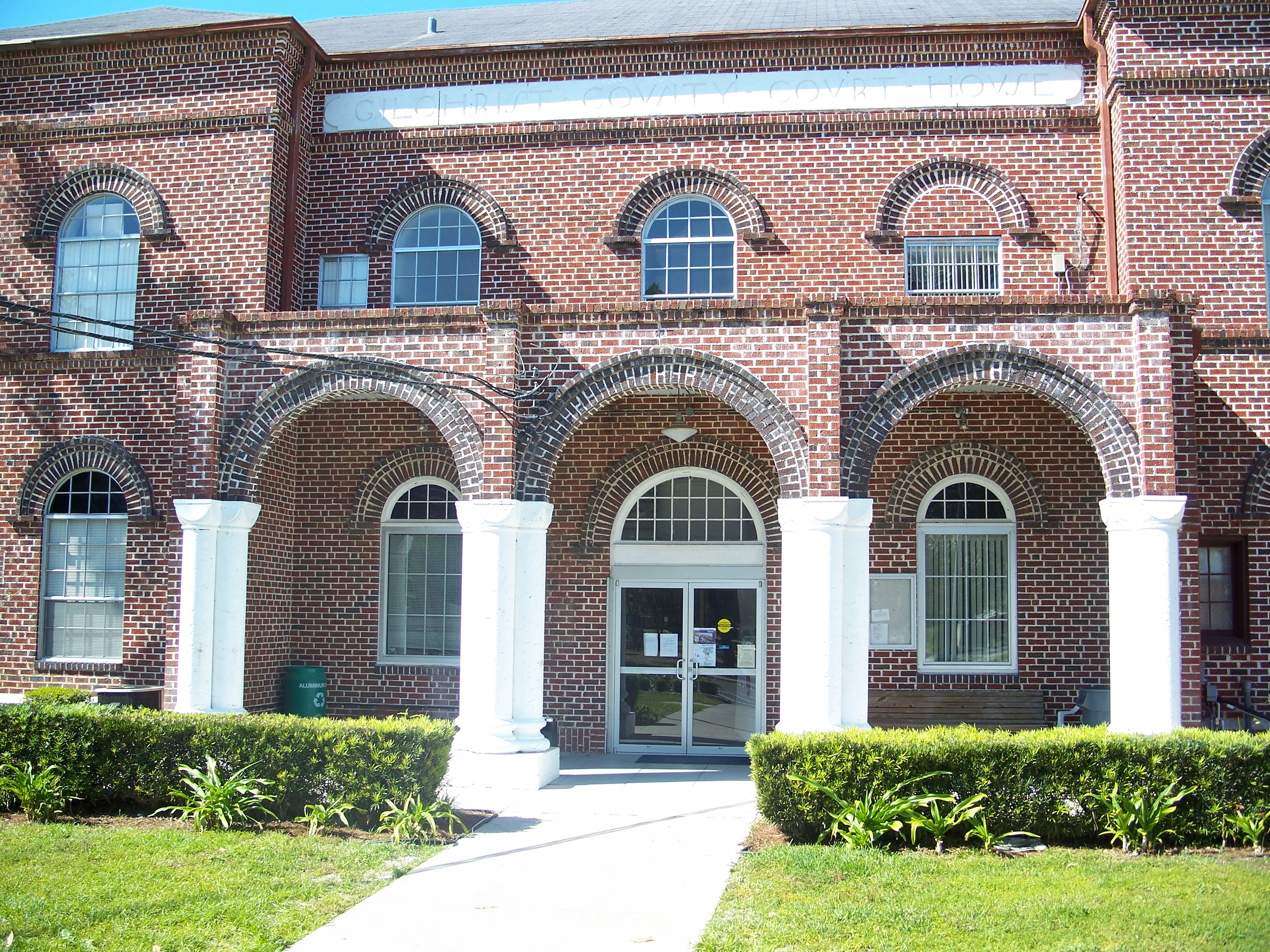
Detail of entrance

The Gilchrist County Courthouse is an historic two-story red brick courthouse building located at 112 South Main Street in Trenton, Gilchrist County, Florida. It was designed by the Jacksonville firm of Smith, Holborn, and Dozier and was built in 1933 by the Works Progress Administration. This was one of the employment programs of the President Franklin D. Roosevelt administration during the Great Depression, which invested in infrastructure of the country.

Simply styled, the courthouse has "decorative corbeled courses, arched window opening with drip courses, [and a] triple arched entry porch." with four sets of double columns. In 1965 it was remodeled and expanded with one-story utilitarian additions.

In 1989, the Gilchrist County Courthouse was listed in A Guide to Florida's Historic Architecture, published by the University of Florida Press.
