= Gilchrist County, Florida =

County in Florida, United States

- County
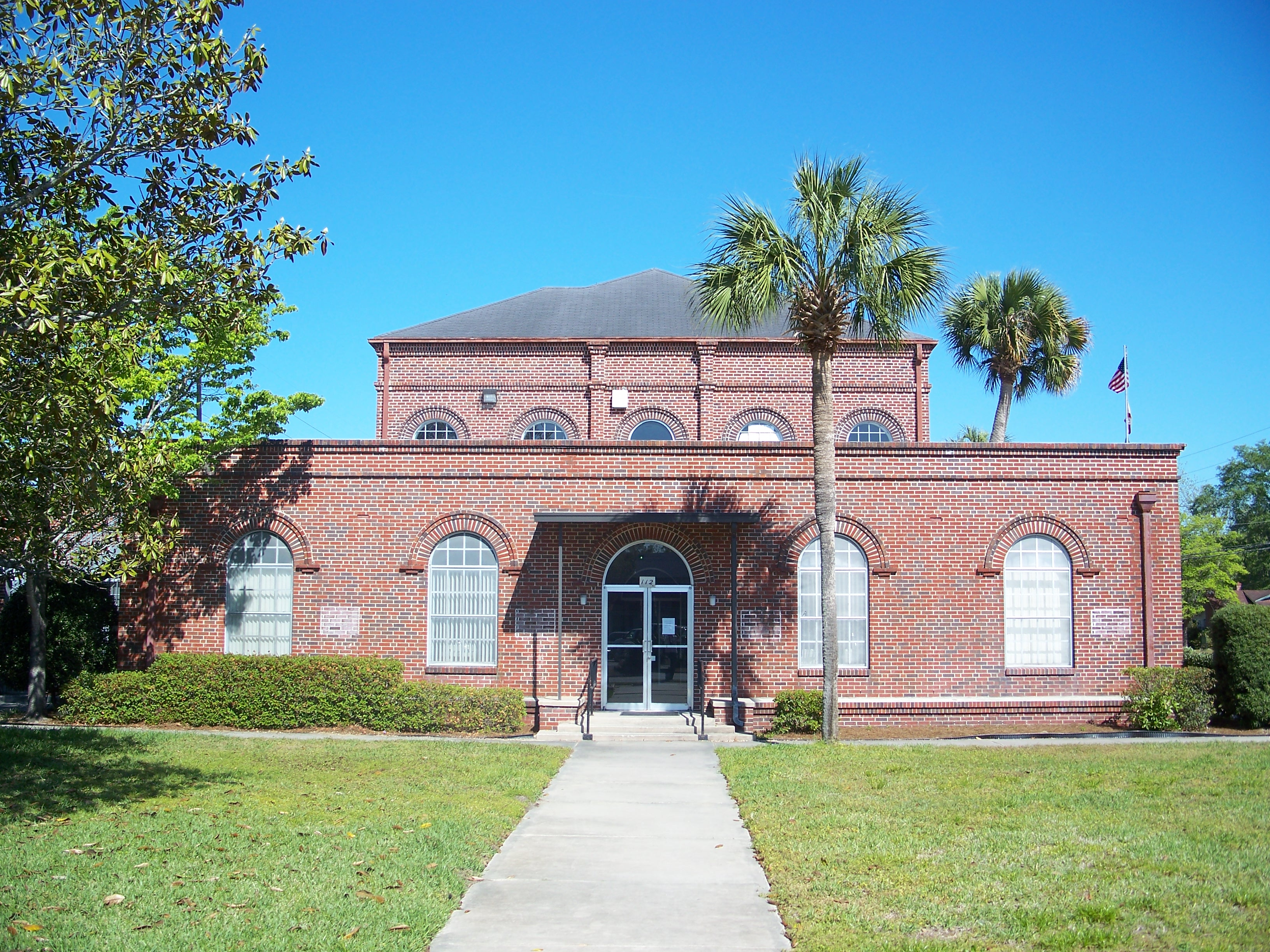
- Gilchrist County Courthouse

- Location within the U.S. state of Florida
- Coordinates: 29°44′N 82°48′W
- Country: United States
- State: Florida
- Founded: December 4, 1925
- Named for: Albert W. Gilchrist
- Seat: Trenton
- Largest city: Trenton

Area
  - Total: 355 sq mi (920 km^{2})
  - Land: 350 sq mi (910 km^{2})
  - Water: 5.6 sq mi (15 km^{2}) 1.6%

Population (2020)
  - Total: 17,864
  - Estimate (2025): 20,488 ▲
  - Density: 51/sq mi (20/km^{2})
- Time zone: UTC−5 (Eastern)
  - Summer (DST): UTC−4 (EDT)
- Congressional district: 3rd
- Website: gilchrist.fl.us

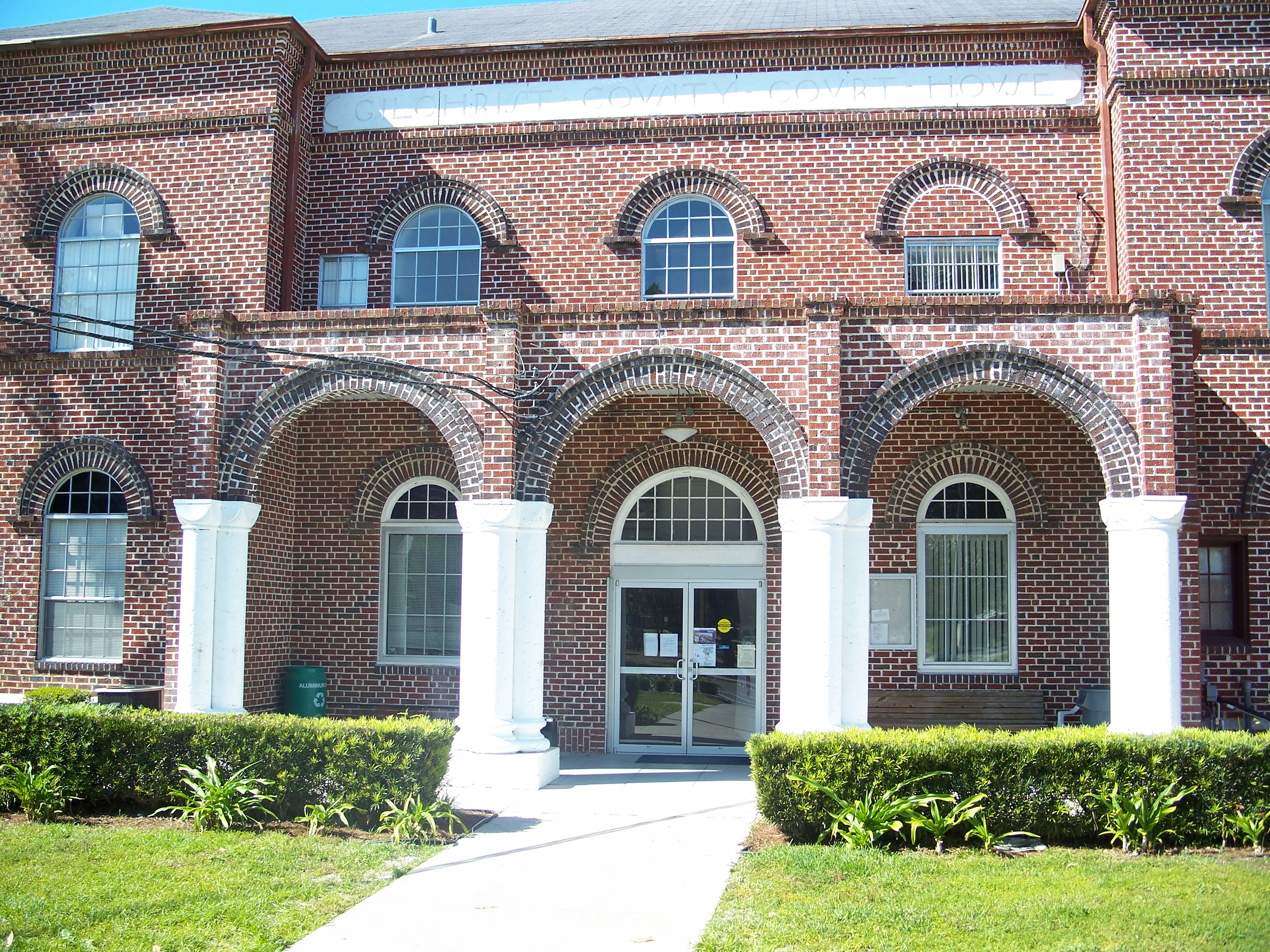
Gilchrist County Courthouse, in Trenton

Gilchrist County is a county located in the north central part of the U.S. state of Florida. Organized in 1925 from the western part of Alachua, it is the last county to be formed in the state. As of the 2020 census, the population was 17,864. The county seat is Trenton.

Gilchrist County is included in the Gainesville, Florida metropolitan area.

== History ==
Gilchrist County was created in 1925, the last county organized in Florida. It was originally set to be named Melon County due to watermelons being one of the main exports from the area; however, the death of Albert W. Gilchrist, Governor of Florida from 1909 to 1913, prompted its renaming to Gilchrist County instead.

It was formed by residents of what was then western Alachua County, as they believed they were not getting adequate representation on the county commission. With the poor roads of the time, they felt it took too long to get to the county seat of Gainesville. They disagreed about a proposed law that would require fencing in cattle in the rural area. They also believed that they would be better off by getting their own share of racetrack revenues, which the state distributed by county.

Much of the county was farmland and timberland when formed, and it is largely rural. Several natural springs are adjacent to the Santa Fe River, including Ginnie Springs, Hart Springs, and Gilchrist Blue Springs, the last of which became a Florida state park in 2017.

=== Historic buildings ===
Historic buildings in Gilchrist County include:

- First Baptist Church, on East Wade Street
- Gilchrist County Courthouse
- Trenton Depot
- Jennings Lake Seventh-Day Adventist Church
- The old Trenton Church of Christ on South Main Street.
- Gilchrist County Jail, built in 1926, operated from 1928 to 1968.

== Geography ==
According to the U.S. Census Bureau, the county has a total area of 355 square miles (920 km^{2}), of which 350 square miles (910 km^{2}) is land and 5.6 square miles (15 km^{2}) (1.6%) is water. It is the fifth-smallest county in Florida by land area and fourth-smallest by total area.

=== Adjacent counties ===
- Columbia County, Florida – northeast
- Alachua County, Florida – east
- Levy County, Florida – south
- Dixie County, Florida – southwest
- Suwannee County, Florida – northwest
- Lafayette County, Florida – northwest

== Demographics ==
Historical population
Census	Pop.	Note	%±
1930	4,137		—
1940	4,250		2.7%
1950	3,499		−17.7%
1960	2,868		−18.0%
1970	3,551		23.8%
1980	5,767		62.4%
1990	9,667		67.6%
2000	14,437		49.3%
2010	16,939		17.3%
2020	17,864		5.5%
2025 (est.)	20,488	▲	14.7%
U.S. Decennial Census; 1790–1960 1900–1990; 1990–2000 2010–2019

=== Racial and ethnic composition ===
Gilchrist County, Florida – Racial and ethnic composition Note: the US Census treats Hispanic/Latino as an ethnic category. This table excludes Latinos from the racial categories and assigns them to a separate category. Hispanics/Latinos may be of any race.
Race / Ethnicity (NH = Non-Hispanic)	Pop 1980	Pop 1990	Pop 2000	Pop 2010	Pop 2020	% 1980	% 1990	% 2000	% 2010	% 2020
White alone (NH)	5,352	8,656	12,812	14,882	14,827	92.80%	89.54%	88.74%	87.86%	83.00%
Black or African American alone (NH)	344	811	996	884	788	5.96%	8.39%	6.90%	5.22%	4.41%
Native American or Alaska Native alone (NH)	8	30	50	63	62	0.14%	0.31%	0.35%	0.37%	0.35%
Asian alone (NH)	4	18	22	59	56	0.07%	0.19%	0.15%	0.35%	0.31%
Native Hawaiian or Pacific Islander alone (NH)	x	x	1	1	2	x	x	0.01%	0.01%	0.01%
Other race alone (NH)	2	2	7	12	45	0.03%	0.02%	0.05%	0.07%	0.25%
Mixed race or Multiracial (NH)	x	x	145	193	736	x	x	1.00%	1.14%	4.12%
Hispanic or Latino (any race)	57	150	404	845	1,348	0.99%	1.55%	2.80%	4.99%	7.55%
Total	5,767	9,667	14,437	16,939	17,864	100.00%	100.00%	100.00%	100.00%	100.00%

A map of racial demographics in Gilchrist County, Florida by Census tract Legend: Non-Hispanic White 70–80% 80–90% >90%

=== 2020 census ===
As of the 2020 census, there were 17,864 people, 6,551 households, and 4,463 families residing in the county. The median age was 44.2 years, with 20.7% of residents under the age of 18 and 21.2% of residents 65 years of age or older. For every 100 females, there were 105.8 males, and for every 100 females age 18 and over there were 106.5 males age 18 and over.

The racial makeup of the county was 84.9% White, 4.5% Black or African American, 0.4% American Indian and Alaska Native, 0.4% Asian, <0.1% Native Hawaiian and Pacific Islander, 3.3% from some other race, and 6.5% from two or more races. Hispanic or Latino residents of any race comprised 7.5% of the population.

<0.1% of residents lived in urban areas, while 100.0% lived in rural areas.

The 2020 census also reported 7,493 housing units, of which 12.6% were vacant. Among occupied housing units, 84.4% were owner-occupied and 15.6% were renter-occupied. The homeowner vacancy rate was 1.5% and the rental vacancy rate was 7.1%.

Among the 6,551 households, 30.2% had children under the age of 18 living in them. Of all households, 51.2% were married-couple households, 17.8% were households with a male householder and no spouse or partner present, and 24.2% were households with a female householder and no spouse or partner present. About 23.5% of all households were made up of individuals and 12.6% had someone living alone who was 65 years of age or older.

=== 2000 census ===
As of the census of 2000, there were 14,437 people, 5,021 households, and 3,715 families residing in the county. The population density was 41 inhabitants per square mile (16/km^{2}). There were 5,906 housing units at an average density of 17 per square mile (6.6/km^{2}). The racial makeup of the county was 90.52% White, 7.00% Black or African American, 0.37% Native American, 0.17% Asian, 0.01% Pacific Islander, 0.69% from other races, and 1.26% from two or more races. 2.80% of the population were Hispanic or Latino of any race. In terms of ancestry, 16.9% were English, 13.9% were Irish, 13.7% were American, and 11.4% were German.

There were 5,021 households, out of which 32.90% had children under the age of 18 living with them, 59.00% were married couples living together, 11.20% had a female householder with no husband present, and 26.00% were non-families. 21.10% of all households were made up of individuals, and 8.70% had someone living alone who was 65 years of age or older. The average household size was 2.61 and the average family size was 3.01.

In the county, the population was spread out, with 24.40% under the age of 18, 14.20% from 18 to 24, 24.80% from 25 to 44, 22.90% from 45 to 64, and 13.60% who were 65 years of age or older. The median age was 35 years. For every 100 females, there were 112.50 males. For every 100 females age 18 and over, there were 115.10 males.

The median income for a household in the county was $30,328, and the median income for a family was $34,485. Males had a median income of $27,359 versus $21,946 for females. The per capita income for the county was $13,985. About 10.90% of families and 14.10% of the population were below the poverty line, including 17.60% of those under age 18 and 12.90% of those age 65 or over.

== Economy ==
The Trenton State Farmer's Market is located on State Road 47, north of Trenton.

== Politics ==
=== Voter registration ===
According to the Secretary of State's office, Republicans maintain a majority of registered voters in Gilchrist County.

Gilchrist County Voter Registration & Party Enrollment as of September 30, 2024
Political Party	Total Voters	Percentage
Republican	8,936	67.85%
Democratic	2,019	15.33%
other party affiliation	344	2.61%
no party affiliation	1,871	14.21%
Total	13,170	100.00%

=== Statewide elections ===
United States presidential election results for Gilchrist County, Florida
Year	Republican		Democratic		Third party(ies)	
Year	No.	%	No.	%	No.	%
1928	125	22.73%	392	71.27%	33	6.00%
1932	57	6.54%	814	93.46%	0	0.00%
1936	56	6.28%	836	93.72%	0	0.00%
1940	88	8.01%	1,011	91.99%	0	0.00%
1944	81	8.59%	862	91.41%	0	0.00%
1948	46	4.34%	884	83.32%	131	12.35%
1952	195	16.43%	992	83.57%	0	0.00%
1956	137	12.90%	925	87.10%	0	0.00%
1960	277	24.93%	834	75.07%	0	0.00%
1964	540	43.17%	711	56.83%	0	0.00%
1968	183	12.12%	208	13.77%	1,119	74.11%
1972	1,306	83.45%	247	15.78%	12	0.77%
1976	528	22.43%	1,807	76.76%	19	0.81%
1980	1,093	39.13%	1,627	58.25%	73	2.61%
1984	2,056	66.15%	1,051	33.82%	1	0.03%
1988	1,855	61.59%	1,137	37.75%	20	0.66%
1992	1,395	34.73%	1,511	37.62%	1,111	27.66%
1996	1,939	40.44%	1,985	41.40%	871	18.16%
2000	3,300	61.17%	1,910	35.40%	185	3.43%
2004	4,936	70.36%	2,017	28.75%	62	0.88%
2008	5,656	72.34%	1,996	25.53%	167	2.14%
2012	5,917	74.55%	1,885	23.75%	135	1.70%
2016	6,740	79.56%	1,458	17.21%	274	3.23%
2020	7,895	81.37%	1,700	17.52%	107	1.10%
2024	8,931	83.27%	1,662	15.50%	132	1.23%

United States Senate election results for Gilchrist County, Florida1
Year	Republican		Democratic		Third party(ies)	
Year	No.	%	No.	%	No.	%
2024	8,740	82.73%	1,617	15.31%	207	1.96%

United States Senate election results for Gilchrist County, Florida3
Year	Republican		Democratic		Third party(ies)	
Year	No.	%	No.	%	No.	%
2022	6,657	84.85%	1,087	13.85%	102	1.30%

Florida Gubernatorial election results for Gilchrist County
Year	Republican		Democratic		Third party(ies)	
Year	No.	%	No.	%	No.	%
1994	1,922	53.05%	1,701	46.95%	0	0.00%
1998	2,097	59.83%	1,408	40.17%	0	0.00%
2002	3,060	60.34%	1,930	38.06%	81	1.60%
2006	3,160	59.59%	1,906	35.94%	237	4.47%
2010	3,321	61.71%	1,797	33.39%	264	4.91%
2014	4,129	69.24%	1,485	24.90%	349	5.85%
2018	5,975	81.12%	1,282	17.40%	109	1.48%
2022	6,806	86.50%	1,017	12.93%	45	0.57%

== Library ==
The Gilchrist County Public library is part of the Three Rivers Regional Library System, which also serves Dixie, Lafayette, and Taylor counties.

== Communities ==
=== Cities ===
- Fanning Springs (shared with Levy County)
- Trenton (county seat)

=== Town ===
- Bell

=== Census-designated place ===
- Spring Ridge

=== Other unincorporated communities ===
- Craggs
- Curtis
- Little Lake City
- Lottieville
- Neals
- Tyler
- Wannee
- Waters Lake
- Wilcox
- Wilcox Junction
- Williford

== Transportation ==
=== Major highways ===
- US 19 / US 98 / US 27 Alt. (SR 55)
- US 129 (SR 49)
- SR 26
- SR 47

=== Railroads ===
Gilchrist County has only three abandoned railroad lines. Seaboard Air Line Railroad's Wannee Subdivision and two former Atlantic Coast Line Railroad lines. The Thomasville-Dunnellon Line and the Jacksonville-Wilcox Line. The latter of these two lines are currently part of the Nature Coast State Trail. An extension of the trail along the former Jacksonville-Wilcox line was added toward Newberry in Alachua County.

== Notable people ==
- Easton Corbin, country music singer
- Carl O. Drummond, Florida politician
- Wyatt Langford, Texas Ranger's Leftfielder

== See also ==
- National Register of Historic Places listings in Gilchrist County, Florida
