= Foxleigh, Florida =

- Unincorporated community
- Location within Florida Location within the United States
- Coordinates: 27°29′56″N 82°26′00″W
- Country: United States
- State: Florida
- County: Manatee
- Elevation: 20 ft (6.1 m)
- Time zone: UTC-5 (EST)
  - Summer (DST): UTC-4 (EDT)
- Area code: 941
- FIPS code: 12-24675
- GNIS feature ID: 295303

Foxleigh is an unincorporated area in Manatee County, Florida, in the United States. Foxleigh was a 999-acre (404 ha) grove ranch located along Upper Manatee Road and off State Road 64 in northeastern Manatee County. It began as Eagle Fruit Farms, its more familiar name, and was operated by Eagle Fruit Company.

== History ==
In 1923, Sam Breadon (1876–1949), owner/president of the St. Louis Cardinals baseball team entered into a partnership with William H. Anderson (1855–1938), a Cardinals stockholder to establish Eagle Fruit Company. Breadon was keen on farming and had recently chosen Bradenton as the spring training headquarters of the Cardinals. The partnership ended in 1934 when Breadon sustained a loss of $7,000 and subsequent time in court. The company was dissolved in 1935.

Missouri-based Gertrude Fox made the ranch her private estate when she purchased it in 1939, renaming it "Foxleigh". She ran a mink farm and was the author of books on fur making. Fox subsequently sold the property in 1945 to the Lee Company, and shortly after, a fire destroyed the farm. In 1948, the 918-acre (372 ha) farm was put up for sale, and Eagle Fruit Farms, Inc. name was officially dissolved. A portion of the former ranch was sold off in 1952 for a planned dairy and cattle ranch. In 1968, a legal notice in the Bradenton Herald listed the property as abandoned. The property was developed and is part of the northeastern Manatee County area. As of 2021, the site is occupied by the Gates Creek subdivision.
