= Trenton station (Atlantic Coast Line Railroad) =

Trenton
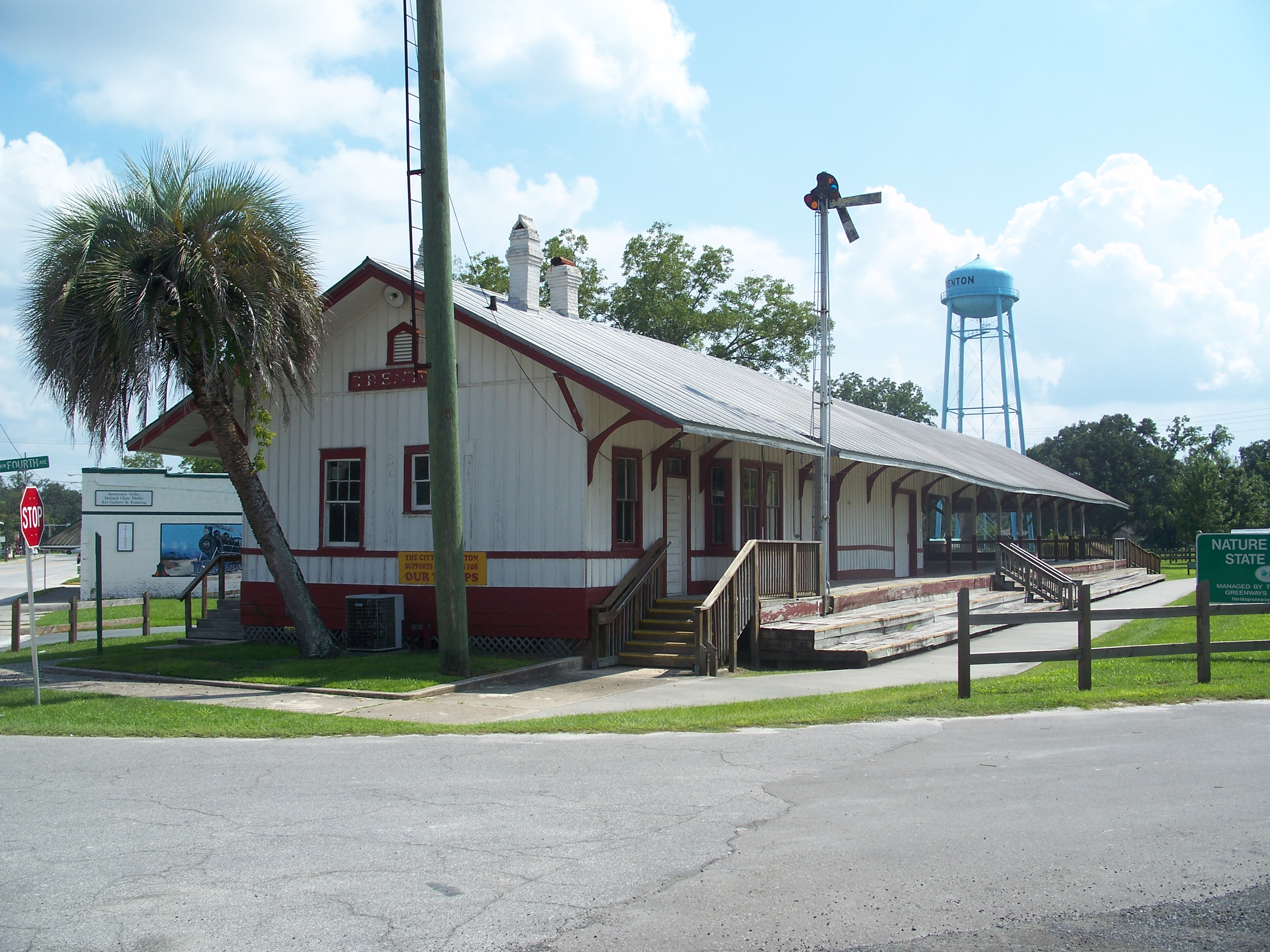
- Trenton Depot
- Interactive map of the Trenton area

General information
- Location: SW corner of N Main St. & NW 4th Ave, Trenton, Florida, United States
- Coordinates: 29.61598°N 82.81872°W
- Completed: ca. 1905
- Client: Atlantic Coast Line Railroad

Technical details
- Structural system: wooden frame

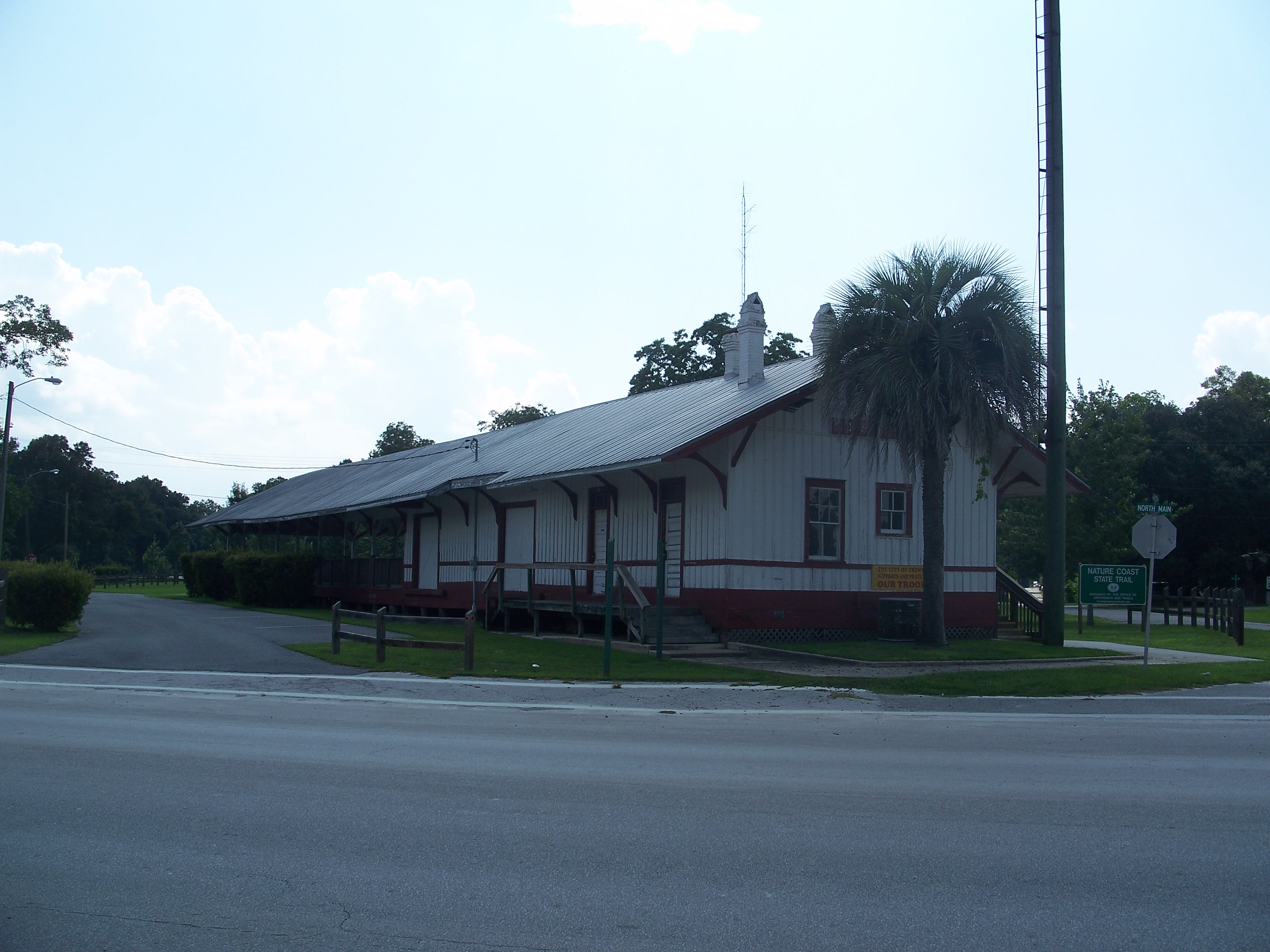
A view of the east side

Trenton is a historic train station in Trenton, Florida. It was built in 1905 as a stop on the Atlantic Coast Line Railroad line from Newberry to Wilcox and on to Cross City.

In 1989, the Trenton Depot was listed in A Guide to Florida's Historic Architecture, published by the University of Florida Press.

In 2004, the Florida West Coast Railroad, which then operated the line through Trenton, was allowed to abandon all of its lines except for a short section leading west from Newberry. In March 2010 the city of Trenton was approved for a 2011 state acquisition and development grant for the Trenton Depot. In June 2010 Florida's governor and cabinet approved the state's purchase of a 9.33-mile corridor from Trenton Depot almost to Newberry for the Trenton-Newberry Rail Trail project.

Preceding station	Atlantic Coast Line Railroad	Following station
Wilcox Terminus	Wilcox – Newberry	Tyler toward Newberry
