= Fern Crest Village =

Unincorporated community in Florida, U.S.

Fern Crest Village is an unincorporated community in Davie, a town in Broward County, Florida, United States. The community is located near the intersection of I-595 and the Turnpike.

== Geography ==
It is located at 26°05′21″N 80°13′09″W, its elevation is seven feet
