= Trenton, Florida =

- City
- City of Trenton
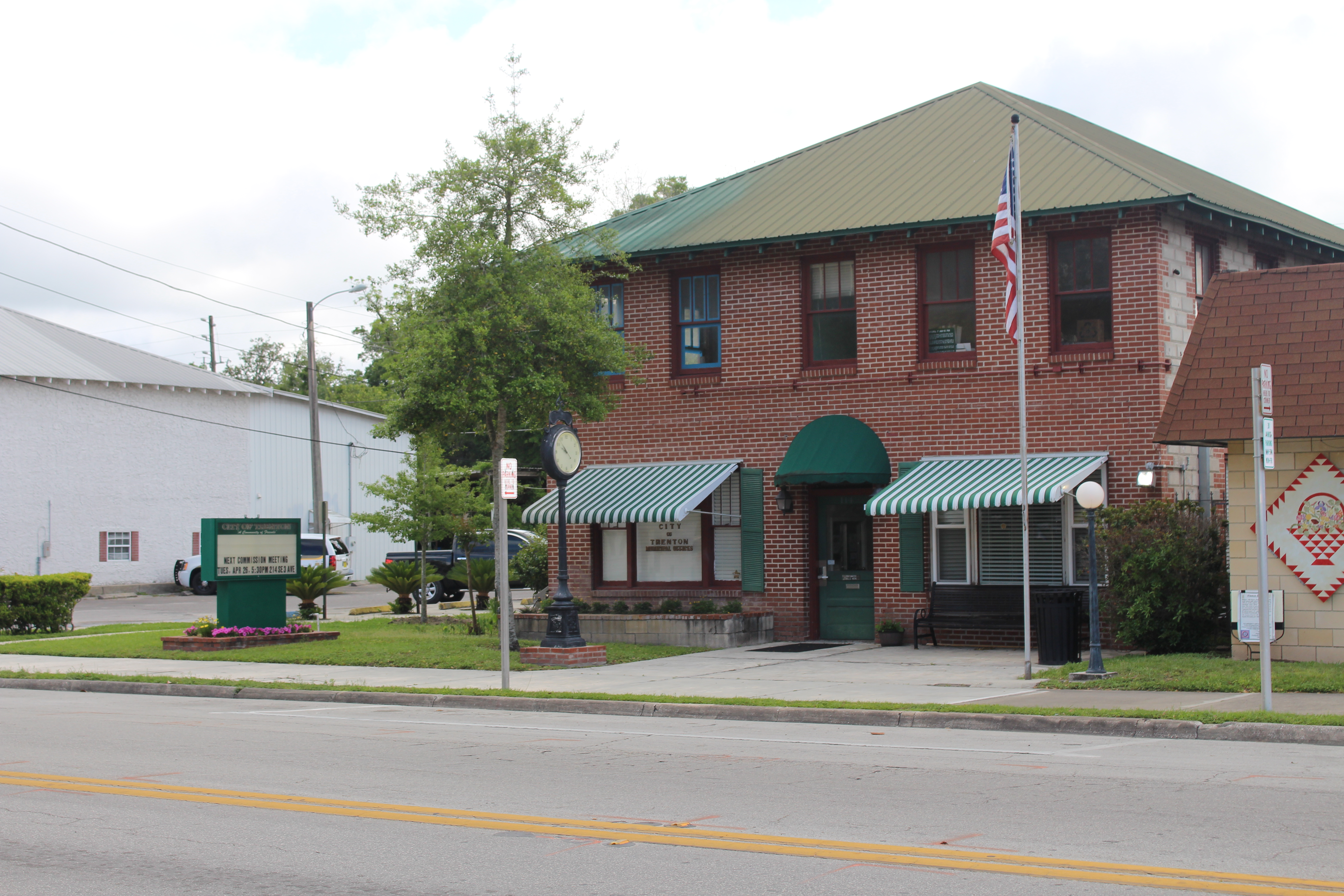
- Trenton City Hall

- Seal
- Mottoes: "A Community of Friends" "Building Upon a Foundation of Integrity"
- Location in Gilchrist County and the state of Florida
- Coordinates: 29°36′33″N 82°48′40″W
- Country: United States
- State: Florida
- County: Gilchrist
- Settled (Joppa): c. 1875–1885
- Incorporated (Town of Trenton): December 12, 1908
- Reincorporated (City of Trenton): 1911
- Named for: Trenton, Tennessee

Government
  - Type: Commission-Manager
  - Mayor: Robbi Coarsey Avery
  - Commissioners: Randy Rutter, Russel Williams, Mary Love Davis, and Lucy Coleman
  - City Manager: Brittany Mills
  - City Attorney: David M. Lang

Area
  - Total: 3.39 sq mi (8.79 km^{2})
  - Land: 3.39 sq mi (8.79 km^{2})
  - Water: 0 sq mi (0.00 km^{2})
- Elevation: 56 ft (17 m)

Population (2020)
  - Total: 2,015
  - Density: 593.9/sq mi (229.32/km^{2})
- Time zone: UTC-5 (Eastern (EST))
  - Summer (DST): UTC-4 (EDT)
- ZIP code: 32693
- Area code: 352
- FIPS code: 12-72350
- GNIS feature ID: 2405604
- Website: www.trentonflorida.org

Trenton is a city in and the county seat of Gilchrist County, Florida, United States. The population was 2,015 as of the 2020 census, up from 1,999 at the 2010 census. It is part of the Gainesville, Florida Metropolitan Statistical Area.

== History ==
=== Prehistory ===
The first Paleo-Indians reached the North Central Florida area near the end of the last ice age, as they followed big game south. As the ice melted and sea levels rose, these Native Americans ended up staying and thrived on the peninsula for thousands of years. By the time the first Spanish conquistadors arrived, there were over 250,000 Native Americans living on the peninsula. The Timucua were a historic tribe across the north central area of Florida, where Trenton later developed.

Within 150 years, the majority of the pre-Columbian Native American peoples of Florida died of new infectious diseases or warfare, with their societies disrupted. Some were enslaved by the Spaniards, and died because of harsh treatment. Little is left of these first Native American cultures in Trenton except for scant archaeological records, including a few personal artifacts. By the early 19th century, the remnants of these tribes merged with the Muscogee (also known as Creek) who migrated from Georgia and Alabama. They created a new culture through ethnogenesis and became known as the Seminole people. Most of the Seminole were removed from North Central Florida by the United States after wars from the 1830s to 1842, while some resisted by moving south into the Everglades and survived.

=== Post-Reconstruction to present ===
When the area was first being settled between 1875 and 1885, it was very briefly called "Joppa" before being named "Trenton" by a former Confederate soldier named Ben Boyd, who owned a sawmill in the community and resided within it too, but who was originally from Trenton, Tennessee (which in turn took their city's name from Trenton, New Jersey, after William Trent). The municipality was officially incorporated as the "Town of Trenton" on December 12, 1908, but it was later reincorporated as the "City of Trenton" in 1911.

Western Alachua County was developed largely for farms and timber, which sometimes attracted itinerant workers. Trenton developed as a trading and market town for this area, with some professionals who worked here in the early 20th century.

On July 21, 1915, Dr. H.M. Owens was lynched by a mob in Trenton after being told to leave town. He was at the house of Mrs. McGuire, which the mob set on fire after the doctor exchanged fire with the crowd. The doctor was shot to death as he fled the burning house. Dr. Owens's local Masonic Lodge was disbanded in the ensuing scandal and only reopened in the 1950s.

At the time, the city of Trenton was still located in Alachua County, which had the sixth highest number of lynchings of counties in Florida.

Trenton is in a rural area, and is the hometown of country music singer Easton Corbin and Major League Baseball player, Wyatt Langford of the Texas Rangers.

=== 2018 shooting ===
On Thursday, April 19, 2018, two Gilchrist County Sheriff's deputies were attacked and slain by a lone gunman while on duty, eating lunch at a local restaurant. The two deputies were identified by Sheriff Bobby Schultz as Sergeant Noel Ramirez and Deputy Taylor Lindsey. The killer, identified as Gilchrist County resident John Hubert Highnote, was found outside the restaurant in his vehicle, where he had committed suicide. The investigation into any possible motive was inconclusive.

== Geography ==
The City of Trenton is located near the southern border of Gilchrist County in North Central Florida.

U.S. Route 129 is the city's Main Street; it leads north 28 miles (45 km) to Branford and south 11 miles (18 km) to Chiefland. Florida State Road 26 (Wade Street) leads east 13 miles (21 km) to Newberry and 30 miles (48 km) to Gainesville, while to the west it leads 8 miles (13 km) to Fanning Springs. Florida State Road 47 (Trenton Boulevard) intersects US 129 in the northern part of Trenton and leads northeast 42 miles (68 km) to Lake City.

According to the United States Census Bureau, the city of Trenton has a total area of 3.4 square miles (8.8 km^{2}), all land.

The Florida Department of Corrections' nearby Lancaster Correctional Institution is 3 miles (5 km) from Trenton.

=== Climate ===
The climate in this area is characterized by hot, humid summers and generally mild winters. According to the Köppen climate classification, the City of Trenton has a humid subtropical climate zone (Cfa).

== Demographics ==
Historical population
Census	Pop.	Note	%±
1910	304		—
1920	400		31.6%
1930	706		76.5%
1940	773		9.5%
1950	904		16.9%
1960	941		4.1%
1970	1,074		14.1%
1980	1,131		5.3%
1990	1,287		13.8%
2000	1,617		25.6%
2010	1,999		23.6%
2020	2,015		0.8%
U.S. Decennial Census

=== Racial and ethnic composition ===
Trenton racial composition (Hispanics excluded from racial categories) (NH = Non-Hispanic)
Race	Pop 2010	Pop 2020	% 2010	% 2020
White (NH)	1,424	1,313	71.24%	65.16%
Black or African American (NH)	350	302	17.51%	14.99%
Native American or Alaska Native (NH)	7	10	0.35%	0.50%
Asian (NH)	11	9	0.55%	0.45%
Pacific Islander or Native Hawaiian (NH)	0	0	0.00%	0.00%
Some other race (NH)	1	5	0.05%	0.25%
Two or more races/Multiracial (NH)	49	92	2.45%	4.57%
Hispanic or Latino (any race)	157	284	7.85%	14.09%
Total	1,999	2,015		

=== 2020 census ===
As of the 2020 census, Trenton had a population of 2,015. The median age was 35.0 years. 27.9% of residents were under the age of 18 and 16.9% of residents were 65 years of age or older. For every 100 females there were 87.4 males, and for every 100 females age 18 and over there were 79.9 males age 18 and over.

0.0% of residents lived in urban areas, while 100.0% lived in rural areas.

There were 698 households in Trenton, of which 46.0% had children under the age of 18 living in them. Of all households, 37.4% were married-couple households, 14.6% were households with a male householder and no spouse or partner present, and 38.3% were households with a female householder and no spouse or partner present. About 22.2% of all households were made up of individuals and 11.2% had someone living alone who was 65 years of age or older.

There were 783 housing units, of which 10.9% were vacant. The homeowner vacancy rate was 3.5% and the rental vacancy rate was 9.4%.

According to the 2020 American Community Survey 5-year estimates, there were 445 families residing in the city.

=== 2010 census ===
As of the 2010 United States census, there were 1,999 people, 755 households, and 430 families residing in the city.

=== 2000 census ===
As of 2000 U.S. Census, there were 1,617 people, 608 households, and 390 families residing in the city. The population density was 623.4 inhabitants per square mile (240.7/km^{2}). There were 690 housing units at an average density of 266.0 per square mile (102.7/km^{2}). The racial makeup of the city was 77.67% White, 20.16% African American, 0.12% Native American, 0.25% Asian, 0.06% Pacific Islander, 0.43% from other races, and 1.30% from two or more races. Hispanic or Latino of any race were 1.67% of the population.

In 2000, there were 608 households, out of which 33.6% had children under the age of 18 living with them, 42.4% were married couples living together, 19.4% had a female widow with no husband present, and 35.7% were non-white. 30.4% of all households were made up of individuals, and 14.6% had someone living alone who was 65 years of age or older. The average household size was 2.47 and the average family size was 3.10.

In 2000, in the city, the population was spread out, with 27.6% under the age of 18, 8.4% from 18 to 24, 23.6% from 25 to 44, 18.8% from 45 to 64, and 21.6% who were 65 years of age or older. The median age was 37 years. For every 100 females, there were 83.1 males. For every 100 females age 18 and over, there were 75.7 males.

In 2000, the median income for a household in the city was $25,259, and the median income for a family was $29,773. Males had a median income of $24,000 versus $21,302 for females. The per capita income for the city was $13,054. About 18.9% of families and 20.4% of the population were below the poverty line, including 30.2% of those under age 18 and 15.2% of those age 65 or over.

== Education ==
All public schools are under the Gilchrist County School District.

Trenton Elementary School serves Trenton area students in grades PreK–5. The Principal is Ronda Adkins and the Assistant Principals are Wendy O'Steen and Scott Allen. Students in grades 6–12 attend Trenton Middle High School. The Principal is Lindsay Legler and the Assistant Principal is Emily Andriaccio.

== Historic buildings ==
Historic buildings in Trenton include:

- Gilchrist County Courthouse
- Trenton Depot
- The Trenton Church of Christ on South Main Street

== Notable people ==
- Easton Corbin, country music singer
- Wyatt Langford, professional MLB baseball player for the Texas Rangers
