= Fanning Springs, Florida =

- City
- City of Fanning Springs
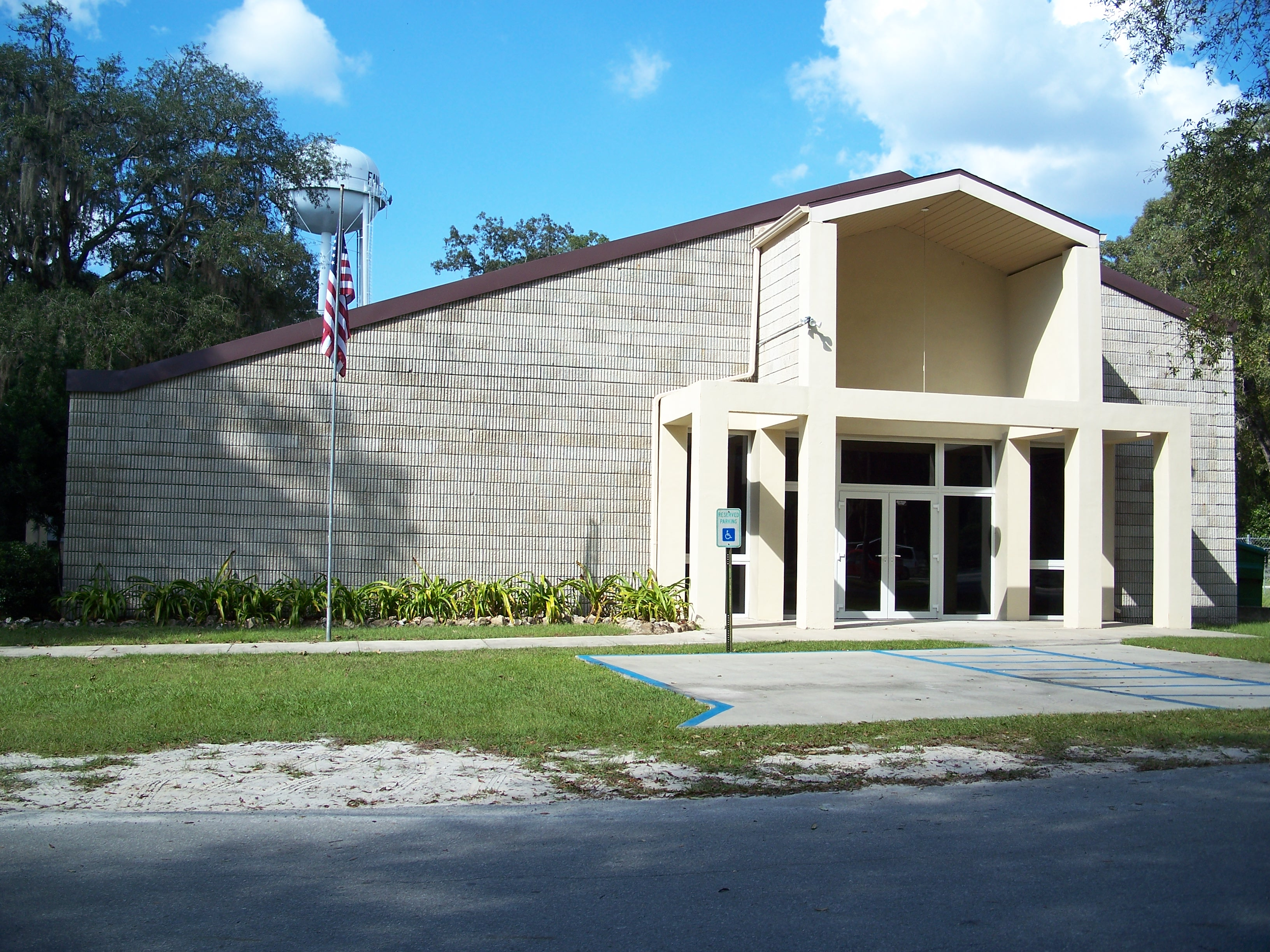
- Fanning Springs City Hall

- Seal
- Motto: "In God We Trust"
- Location in Levy County and the state of Florida
- Coordinates: 29°35′14″N 82°55′28″W
- Country: United States
- State: Florida
- Counties: Levy, Gilchrist
- Settled (Palmetto): c. 1846-1847
- Settled (Sikesville): 1857
- Settled (Fannin): 1888
- Incorporated (Town of Fannin Springs): 1965
- Incorporated (City of Fanning Springs): 1977

Government
  - Type: Mayor-Council
  - Mayor: Howell E. "Trip" Lancaster III
  - Council Chair: Barry Cannon
  - Councilmembers: Wanda Michaud, Matthew Lunsford, Heather Snellgrove, and Vice Chair; Jonathan Smith
  - City Clerk: Sherlene Michaelis
  - City Attorney: Stan Griffis

Area
  - Total: 5.00 sq mi (12.96 km^{2})
  - Land: 4.87 sq mi (12.61 km^{2})
  - Water: 0.14 sq mi (0.35 km^{2})
- Elevation: 26 ft (7.9 m)

Population (2020)
  - Total: 1,182
  - Density: 242.8/sq mi (93.73/km^{2})
- Time zone: UTC-5 (Eastern (EST))
  - Summer (DST): UTC-4 (EDT)
- ZIP code: 32693
- Area code: 352
- FIPS code: 12-21850
- GNIS feature ID: 2403596
- Website: www.fanningsprings.org

Fanning Springs is a city in Gilchrist and Levy counties in the U.S. state of Florida. It is part of the Gainesville, Florida Metropolitan Statistical Area. The population was 1,182 at the 2020 census, up from 764 at the 2010 census.

== History ==
The town is named after Fort Fanning, a U.S. Army post established in 1838 during the Second Seminole War, named for Lieutenant Colonel Alexander C. W. Fanning (1788-1846). The fort was sited at a historically strategic point on the east bank above a sharp bend of the Suwannee River, across from the west bank site of Seminole war chief Bolek's Old Town. As the population changed from generation to generation after its founding, local residents referred to the settlement as "Fort Fannin", then by 1904 as "Fannin" when the people were focused on the ferry traversing the river, then after March 1922 as "Fannin Springs" (the big spring was about 100 yards above the ferry landing) after the first highway bridge was installed.

The community has had many names throughout its history, as the first postmaster, Thomas C. Love, named it "Palmetto" between 1846 and 1847, then the name changed to "Sikesville" in 1857, and renamed as "Fannin" in 1888. And despite Fanning Springs being a settlement since 1846, it wasn't officially incorporated as a municipality until 1965, as the "Town of Fannin Springs", and reincorporated as the "City of Fanning Springs" in 1977, where they added the "g" in "Fanning".

== Geography ==
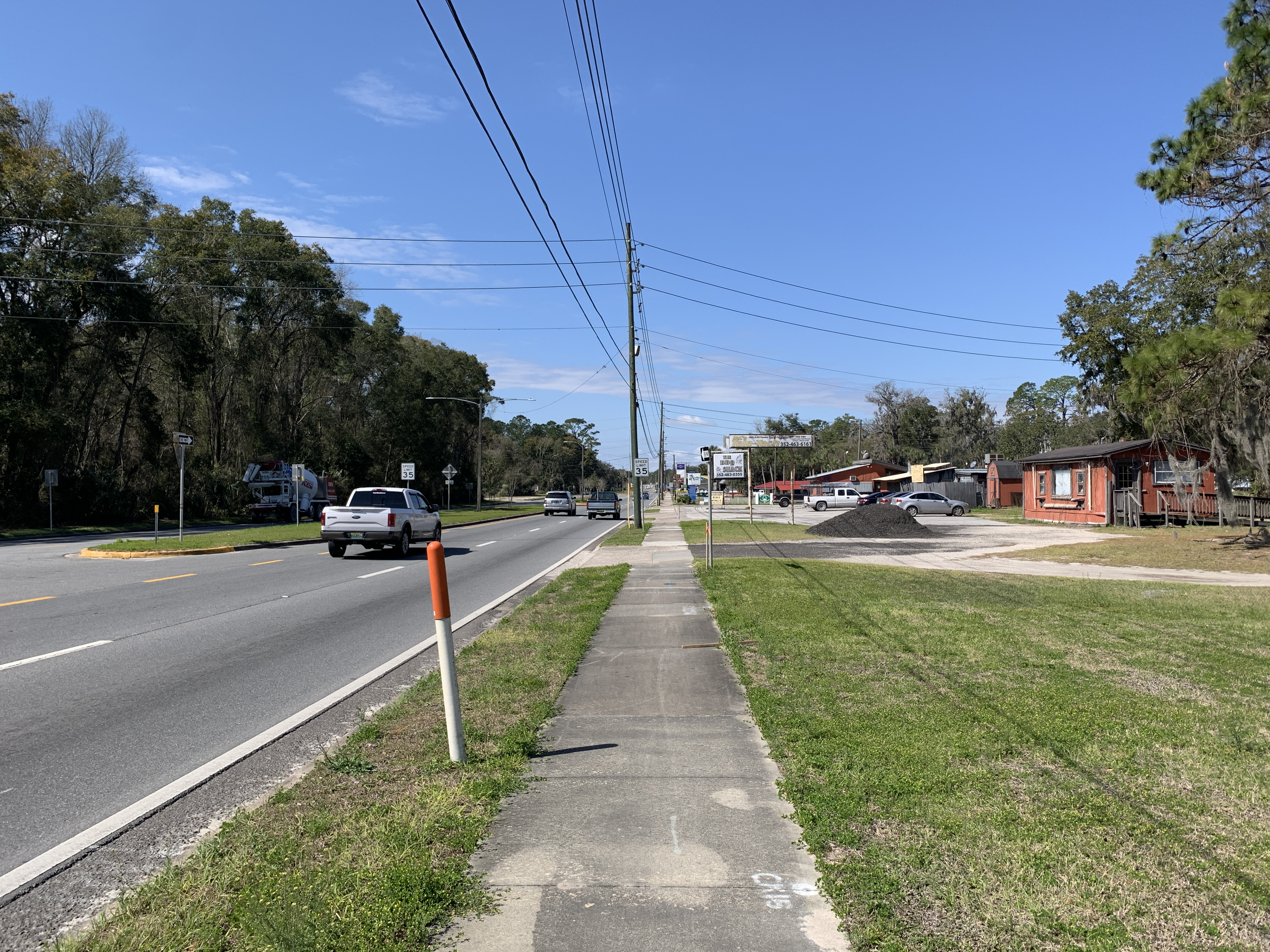
A pedestrian view of the city

The City of Fanning Springs is located along the Nature Coast in North Florida, (specifically North Central Florida).

According to the United States Census Bureau, the city has a total area of 3.9 square miles (10.2 km^{2}), of which 3.8 square miles (9.8 km^{2}) is land and 0.12 square miles (0.3 km^{2}), or 3.40%, is water.

=== Climate ===
The climate in this area is characterized by hot, humid summers and generally mild winters. According to the Köppen climate classification, the City of Fanning Springs has a humid subtropical climate zone (Cfa).

== Demographics ==
Historical population
Census	Pop.	Note	%±
1970	115		—
1980	314		173.0%
1990	493		57.0%
2000	737		49.5%
2010	764		3.7%
2020	1,182		54.7%
U.S. Decennial Census

=== Racial and ethnic composition ===
Fanning Springs racial composition (Hispanics excluded from racial categories) (NH = Non-Hispanic)
Race	Pop 2010	Pop 2020	% 2010	% 2020
White (NH)	677	988	88.61%	83.59%
Black or African American (NH)	5	25	0.65%	2.12%
Native American or Alaska Native (NH)	11	11	1.44%	0.93%
Asian (NH)	5	14	0.65%	1.18%
Pacific Islander or Native Hawaiian (NH)	0	0	0.00%	0.00%
Some other race (NH)	0	1	0.00%	0.08%
Two or more races/Multiracial (NH)	7	50	0.92%	4.23%
Hispanic or Latino (any race)	59	93	7.72%	7.87%
Total	764	1,182		

=== 2020 census ===
As of the 2020 census, Fanning Springs had a population of 1,182. The median age was 52.1 years. 19.2% of residents were under the age of 18 and 32.9% of residents were 65 years of age or older. For every 100 females there were 92.5 males, and for every 100 females age 18 and over there were 89.1 males age 18 and over.

0.0% of residents lived in urban areas, while 100.0% lived in rural areas.

There were 460 households in Fanning Springs, of which 27.6% had children under the age of 18 living in them. Of all households, 42.8% were married-couple households, 21.3% were households with a male householder and no spouse or partner present, and 28.5% were households with a female householder and no spouse or partner present. About 27.2% of all households were made up of individuals and 13.3% had someone living alone who was 65 years of age or older.

There were 541 housing units, of which 15.0% were vacant. The homeowner vacancy rate was 2.8% and the rental vacancy rate was 9.7%.

According to the 2020 American Community Survey 5-year estimates, there were 304 families residing in the city.

=== 2010 census ===
As of the 2010 United States census, there were 764 people, 442 households, and 298 families residing in the city.

=== 2000 census ===
As of the census of 2000, there were 737 people, 311 households, and 198 families residing in the city. The population density was 207.2 inhabitants per square mile (80.0/km^{2}). There were 397 housing units at an average density of 111.6 per square mile (43.1/km^{2}). The racial makeup of the city was 89.01% White, 4.34% African American, 0.68% Native American, 0.54% Asian, 3.66% from other races, and 1.76% from two or more races. Hispanic or Latino of any race were 8.96% of the population.

In 2000, there were 311 households, out of which 25.4% had children under the age of 18 living with them, 42.8% were married couples living together, 15.8% had a female householder with no husband present, and 36.3% were non-families. 29.3% of all households were made up of individuals, and 12.2% had someone living alone who was 65 years of age or older. The average household size was 2.37 and the average family size was 2.84.

In 2000, in the city, the population was spread out, with 24.7% under the age of 18, 9.5% from 18 to 24, 23.7% from 25 to 44, 25.0% from 45 to 64, and 17.1% who were 65 years of age or older. The median age was 38 years. For every 100 females, there were 100.3 males. For every 100 females age 18 and over, there were 91.4 males.

In 2000, the median income for a household in the city was $17,875, and the median income for a family was $24,167. Males had a median income of $25,139 versus $14,306 for females. The per capita income for the city was $11,389. About 26.1% of families and 30.5% of the population were below the poverty line, including 46.6% of those under age 18 and 19.9% of those age 65 or over.

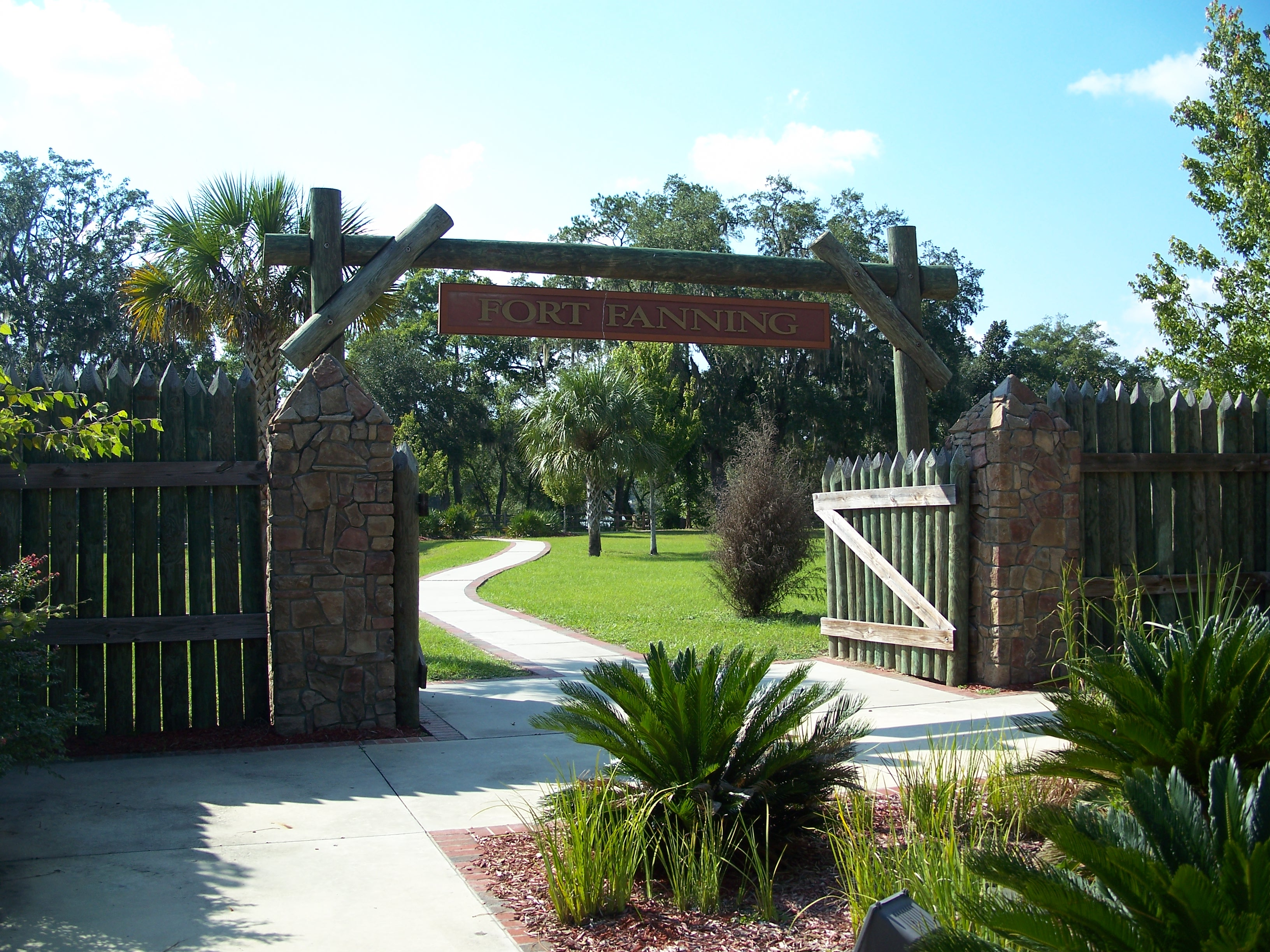
Fort Fanning Historical Park

== Attractions ==
The Nature Coast State Trail (being the City of Fanning Springs is part of the Nature Coast), which follows abandoned railway lines, has a junction at Fanning Springs.

Fanning Springs State Park is located just south of the center of the city, along the Suwannee River. Fort Fanning Historic Park is the site of a fort that was built in 1838 to counter Native American attacks in North Florida during the Seminole Wars.
