= Florida State Road 326 =

State highway in Florida, United States

State Road 326
- SR 326 in red, segments of CR 326 in blue

Route information
- Maintained by FDOT
- Length: 11.577 mi (18.631 km)
- Existed: 1945 renumbering–present

Major junctions
- West end: I-75 / CR 326 near Zuber
- US 301 / US 441 near Zuber
- East end: SR 40 near Silver Springs

Location
- Country: United States
- State: Florida
- Counties: Marion

Highway system
- Florida State Highway System; Interstate; US; State; Former; Pre‑1945; Toll; Scenic
← SR 321	→ SR 327

State Road 326 (SR 326) is an east–west route in Marion County, Florida, in and around Ocala. The western terminus is near Interstate 75's (I-75) exit 358, and its eastern end is at SR 40 east of Silver Springs. The highway acts as a bypass around Ocala, taking traffic to SR 40 on the edge of the Ocala National Forest.

West of I-75, the road continues as County Road 326 (CR 326) in Marion and Levy counties to the Waccasassa River near Gulf Hammock with another segment leading to the Lower Suwannee National Wildlife Refuge adjacent to the Gulf of Mexico.

== Route description ==
=== Levy County, from wetlands to horse farms ===
Previously, Florida State Road 326 was much longer than it is today. It originally ran from Waccasassa Park Boat Ramp on the north side of the Waccasassa River in Williams Camp, Florida. The road starts running north from the river then curves towards the northeast intersecting Fish Camp Road and follows the north side of the wetlands of the river in preserved land between the Waccasassa Bay Preserve State Park and the Gulf Hammock Wildlife Management Area. Levy County Road 326 later passe along a bridge over the Waccasassa River and then runs along the north side of the wetlands of the Wekiva River. That river starts to move away from the road. The road crosses a culvert over another creek flowing west towards the Waccassassa, and later enters Gulf Hammock, where it crosses a bridge over Mule Creek, then turns more toward the east to encounter its first major intersection -- the wide and frequently tree-lined median of U.S. Routes 19 and 98. Gulf Hammock is a former lumber town that contains a post office on the southwest corner of US 19/98, and a wayside park north of the route featuring an old logging locomotive displaying the community's logging heritage along the southbound lanes.

Immediately after crossing the northbound lanes of US 19/98, the road passes by the former right-of-way for the Atlantic Coast Line Railroad's Thomasville—Dunnellon Line It also winds along the western and northern border of the Lower Waccasassa Conservation Area. After the conservation area, it passes through a region that's sparsely residential with mixed agricultural zoning. It even crosses a bridge over the Wekiva River. The mixed-ag farm and ranch land continues until the road curves north then east just before the intersection with Levy County Road 343. Farm and ranch-land resumes here and this time is intersected by a Duke Energy power line right-of-way that runs northwest to southeast followed by a major Duke Energy power line right-of-way that runs straight south-to-north. Only after a private driveway secretly named Southeast 45th Avenue does the road enter Goethe State Forest, which it will meander through for the next 3.7 miles (6.0 km). CR 326 leaves the forest and immediately enters the community of Morriston Junction where it intersects Levy County Road 337. Past CR 337, CR 326 runs through another mixed-agricultural setting, but the area becomes slightly less agricultural as it approaches the blinker-light intersection with Florida State Road 121 an otherwise rural state road that spans as far south as US 19/98 in Lebanon Station, and as far north as Williston, Gainesville, Georgia, and South Carolina.

East of SR 121, CR 326 begins to enter what can only be described as Florida Horse Country. One of the larger facilities in this region is the Oak Ridge Training Center which includes the Big Lick Stall Rental. Smaller tracks and horse farms also surround much of the vicinity. In Morriston CR 326 seems to terminate at U.S. Route 41. However, the route takes a right turn onto a short overlap with southbound US 41 until the western terminus of Levy County Road 323. From there the concurrency with US 41 ends, and CR 326 joins a concurrency with CR 323, which also has a railroad crossing with Florida Northern Railroad's Newberry to Red Level Line. This line was the former Atlantic Coast Line Railroad's DuPont—Lakeland Line. At the site of the abandoned Seaboard Air Line Waldo-Brooksville Line, Levy County Road 326 turns south along 200th Avenue, while Levy County Road 323 continues straight along 32nd Place, and will curve north towards Williston. 200th Avenue takes CR 326 along the former SAL line until the road turns east once again at 35th Street. Along this segment, the usual horse farms are interrupted by forestland and ranchland, including a garden center. The last intersection in Levy County is with Southeast 219th Avenue, which doubles as the entrance to the Starting Point Horse Academy, but Florida horse country continues as the road crosses the Levy-Marion County Line.

=== Marion County, and the transition from county to state road ===
The first site on the north side of Marion County Road 326 is the Pleasant Hill Cemetery, but the rest of the journey maintains the equine-agricultural surroundings carried over from eastern Levy County. At least four moderadely sized horse tracks can be spotted along the north side of the road. Horse country does not end as the route enters Blitchton, but the intersection with U.S. Route 27 is occupied by some not-so-agricultural facilities, such as restaurants, a gas station/convenience store, and a discount store. Past US 27 the rural settings resume. Entering Emathla, CR 326 has an intersection with Marion County Road 225, which spans from Fellowship on US 27 to Irvine on Marion CR 318. 3.8 miles (6.1 km) later, the route encounters an intersection with Marion County Road 225A. Within Zuber, the actual Florida State Road 326 begins just west of Interstate 75 at Exit 358, which is a partial diamond interchange with a west-to-south loop ramp. SR 326 itself becomes a four-lane highway both with and without dividers, the latter of which contains center-left turn lanes. As with many interchanges with interstate highways, the vicinity is surrounded by travel-oriented development. After I-75, SR 326 crosses another Florida Northern Railroad line, this time the Lowell to Candler Line (formerly the ACL High Springs—Croom Line) followed by the intersection with Marion County Road 25A. The route moves from Southwest 77th to Southwest 70th Street and will eventually intersect U.S. Route 301 and U.S. Route 441.

Almost immediately after US 301-441, SR 326's divided highway segment comes to an end and the route runs along the south side of golf course known as The Club at Iron Lake. Here the road becomes a two-lane undivided road with occasional provisions for left turns and rights-of-way for future expansion into a four-lane divided highway. The territory for the golf club ends on the northwest corner of West Anthony Road. Just before crossing under a power line right-of-way, SR 326 shifts to the future eastbound lane property, but then moves back to the future westbound lane property just before the intersection with Marion County Road 200A (Northeast Jacksonville Road), which was once an alternate route of US 301 from Ocala to Citra. The road shifts back to the eastbound lanes right-of-way just before crossing the CSX Wildwood Subdivision, which happens to be right next to Marion County Fire-Rescue Station Number One. It never returns to the future westbound lanes. Somewhere east of a dirt trail named Northeast 33rd Road Court and a pair of ranches along both sides of the road, SR 326 suddenly enters Indian Lake State Forest, then curves to the southeast. An intersection with a local street named Northeast 40th Avenue Road least to the Florida Forest Service's Indian Lake Forestry Station as well as the Ocala Springs Elementary School. The route continues to run straight southeast through preserved forestland before approaching the intersection with Marion County Road 35 which is also intersected by another power line right-of-way owned by the that runs from southwest to northeast to the Seminole Generating Station in Palatka. A brief interruption of preserved land comes in the form of the Silver Meadows gated community which ends shortly at the Silver Springs Forest Conservation Area, a conservation area controlled by the Saint Johns River Water Management District. Sparse local private property can still be found along the road until it curves more towards the south-southeast before entering the northern edges of Silver Springs State Park. Florida State Road 326 ends at Florida State Road 40 within the territory of Silver Springs State Park, approximately near the equestrian trail entrance and the southern terminus of Marion County Road 315.

== Major intersections ==
County	Location	mi	km	Destinations	Notes
Levy	Williams Camp	0.000	0.000	Dead end at Waccasassa River	Waccasassa Park Boat Ramp
Levy	Gulf Hammock	3.864	6.219	US 19 / US 98 (SR 55)	
Levy		7.1	11.4	CR 343 north – Henry Beck Park	
Levy		13.3	21.4	CR 337	
Levy		16.7	26.9	SR 121	
Levy		22.102	35.570	US 41 north (SR 45)	west end of US 41 overlap
Levy		22.362	35.988	US 41 south (SR 45)	east end of US 41 overlap; west end of CR 323 overlap
Levy	Morriston	22.7	36.5	CR 323 north (Southeast 32nd Place)	east end of CR 323 overlap
Marion	Blitchton	29.1	46.8	US 27 (SR 500)	
Marion	Emathla	31.8	51.2	CR 225	
Marion		35.6	57.3	CR 225A	
Marion		37.616	60.537	west end of state maintenance	
Marion		38.11	61.33	I-75 (SR 93) – Lake City, Tampa	I-75 exit 358
Marion	Zuber	38.859	62.537	CR 25A – Fire College, Speedway	
Marion		40.733	65.553	US 301 / US 441 (SR 25 / SR 200) – Gainesville, Ocala	
Marion	Oak	43.049	69.281	CR 200A	
Marion		47.171	75.914	CR 35 (Northeast 58th Avenue)	
Marion		49.193	79.168	SR 40 – Ormond Beach, Silver Springs	
1.000 mi = 1.609 km; 1.000 km = 0.621 mi: Concurrency terminus; Route transition

== Related routes ==
=== Levy CR 326 north of Cedar Key ===
County Road 326
- Location: North of Cedar Key

County Road 326 (CR 326) is a disconnected western extension of CR 326 continues located north of Cedar Key along Southwest 78th Place. It runs from the Shell Mound Campground along the Gulf of Mexico within the Lower Suwannee National Wildlife Refuge through Cedar Key Scrub State Reserve into Levy County Road 347. This segment was a former section of SR 326, and is technically aligned with the main section's western terminus at the Waccasassa Park Boat Ramp. No hypothetical connecting road between these two segments could ever be built due to the vast acreage of preserved wetlands between the gulf and US 19-98.
