= Gulf Hammock, Florida =

Unincorporated community in Florida, U.S.

Coordinates: 29°15′11″N 82°43′27″W

Gulf Hammock
- Unincorporated community
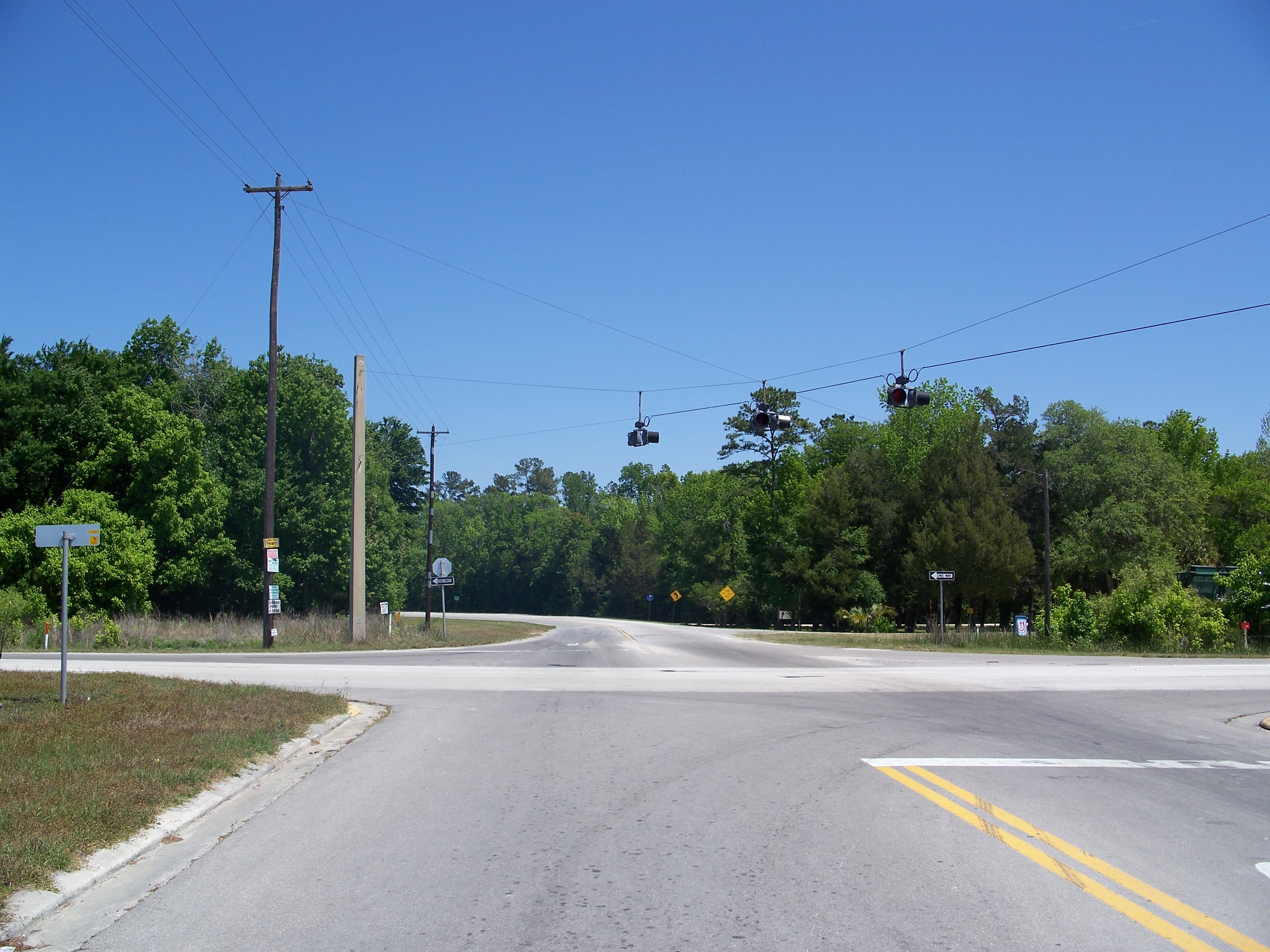
- Intersection of US 19-98 and County Road 326, looking east along CR 326

- Location in Florida Location in the United States
- Country: United States
- State: Florida
- County: Levy County
- Settled: 1846
- Named after: Gulf Hammock wetlands
- Elevation: 10 ft (3.0 m)
- Time zone: UTC-5 (Eastern (EST))
  - Summer (DST): UTC-4 (EDT)
- Area code: 352
- GNIS feature ID: 283492

Gulf Hammock is an unincorporated community in Levy County, Florida, United States. It is near the edge of, and named for, the large wetlands area known as Gulf Hammock. It is located where US 19-98 and County Road 326 cross, near the Wekiva River, (Note: The Wekiva River, also known as Wekiva Creek and Wekiva Run, is a tributary of the Waccasassa River, and has no connection with the Wekiva River that flows north of Orlando into the St. Johns River.) approximately 6 miles (9.7 km) southeast of Otter Creek.

== History ==
The area that is now the community of Gulf Hammock was settled by 1846, near where a north–south road crossed the Wekiva Run. The crossing was originally called Walker Landing. After the Civil War, freedmen who had formerly been enslaved on plantations in the area bought land and established farms. A hunting lodge, called the Wingate Hotel, was located in the area in the 1870s (the hotel was later converted to a barn).

In the early 20th century, Gulf Hammock was a small community with a post office, a general store and a school. The Otter Creek Lumber Company started operating in the area circa 1905. Voting Precinct #16 was established in 1906 in Gulf Hammock at the Hartman School House. S. J. Gunn bought the Otter Creek company and 5,120 acres (20.7 km^{2}) in 1910, and established a crate factory in Gulf Hammock. After the Atlantic Coast Line Railroad opened a rail line through the area in 1913, the community moved to a location adjacent to the railroad. In 1916 a post office named "Gunntown" was opened, named for S. J. Gunn. In December 1920, Precinct #16 was changed from "Hartman School House" to "Gunntown". In 1926, patent medicine entrepreneur Edwin Wiley Grove and two brothers, James and William Dowling, bought the crate factory and all of the land in the community of Gulf Hammock, as well as 132,000 acres (530 km^{2}) of timber land between the Suwannee and Withlacoochee rivers. That same year, the name of the post office was changed to "Gulf Hammock", which remains in use as of 2025. Grove died in 1927, and the Grove-Dowling company went bankrupt in 1929. All the holdings of Grove-Dowling were bought by the Patterson-McInnis Company in 1930.

In 1929, Gulf Hammock had approximately 1,500 residents. It was a company town: all of the houses, two (segregated) churches (schools met in the church buildings), hotels, a hospital, the crate factory, a saw mill, a planing mill, a commissary, and a garage and Ford dealership, were owned by the company. The commissary was housed in a 30,000 square feet (2,800 m^{2}) (Note: The building was either 150-by-200-foot (46 by 61 m) or 100-by-300-foot (30 by 91 m).) building which also housed offices for company officials and the post office. The commissary was well stocked, attracting customers from other communities in the county. The Orange Blossom Hotel, built in 1927, held Saturday night dances which attracted people from neighboring counties. The company paid the salaries of the doctor and nurses at the hospital, the pharmacist in the commissary, and the white preacher, and sometimes subsidized the salaries of the white teachers, who were employees of the county school board. Patterson-McInnis had about 600 employees through the 1930s. The sawmill had three 555 horsepower-hours (414 kWh) steam engines, and produced 125,000 board feet of lumber in 1930. The Georgia-Pacific Company bought Gulf Hammock and the timber lands from Patterson-McInnis in 1940.

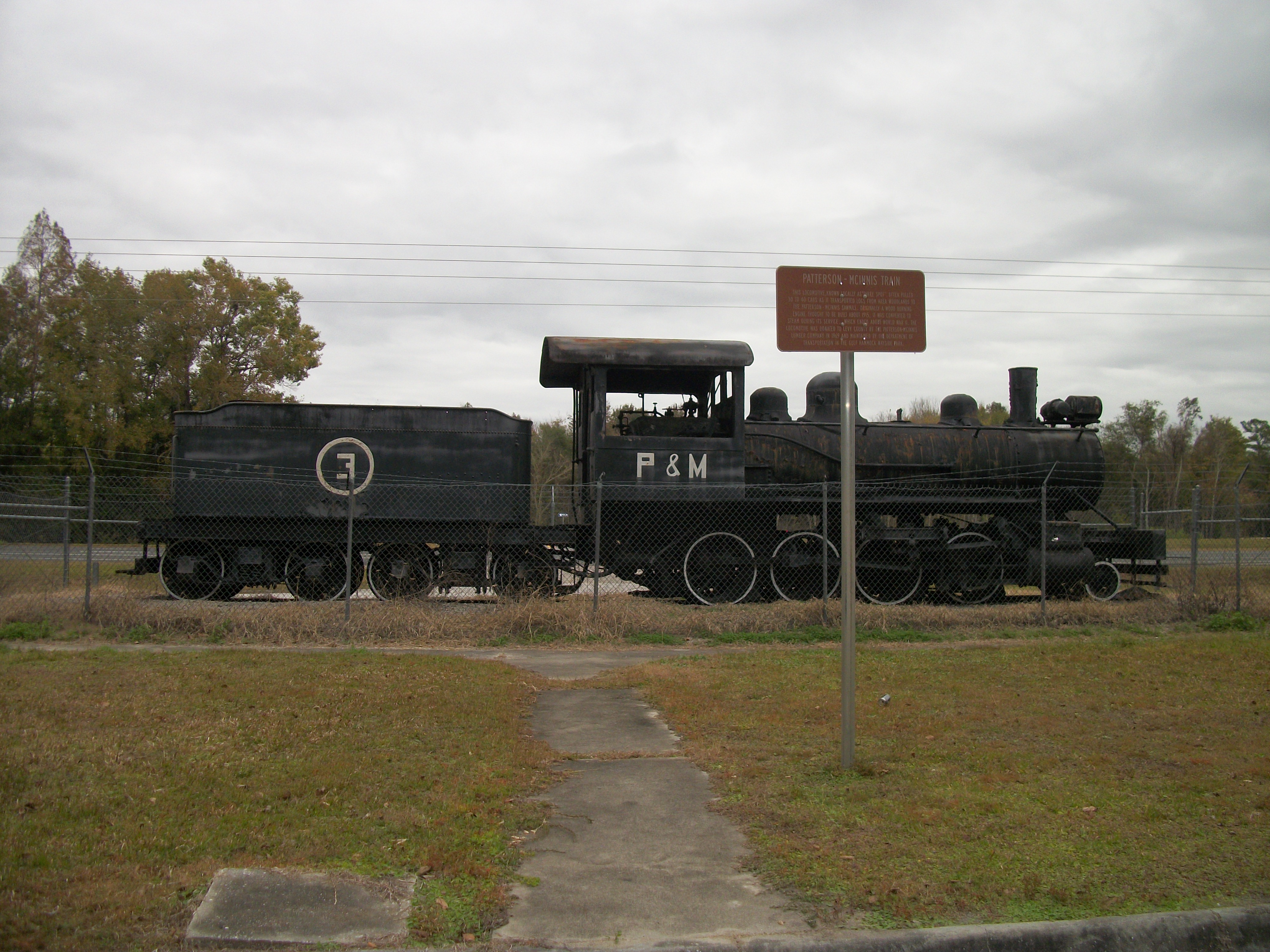
The old Patterson-McInnis Sawmill Locomotive Number 3 at the wayside park on the northwest corner of US 19-98 and CR 326.

In 1969, Georgia-Pacific donated the land on the northwestern corner of US 19-98 and what was then Secondary State Road 326 to the Florida Department of Transportation, which converted it into a wayside park. This park includes the old Patterson-McInnis Railroad steam locomotive number three, as well as the attached tender. The railroad line through the community was gradually abandoned by CSX in the mid-1980's and later dismantled.

Since the late 20th century, Gulf Hammock has been surrounded by public lands including the Goethe State Forest, Gulf Hammock Wildlife Management Area, Waccasassa Bay Preserve State Park, Cedar Key Scrub State Reserve, and Devil's Hammock Wildlife Management Area.

== Sources ==
- Snider, Carol Swaggerty (October 1980), "Gulf Hammock, the town", Search for yesterday: a history of Levy County, Florida, Chapter 10
- Verrill, Ruth (1976). Romantic and Historic Levy County. Gainesville, Florida: Storter Printing Company.
