= Gulf Hammock =

Gulf Hammock may refer to:

- Gulf Hammock (wetlands), a natural area in southern Levy County, Florida
- Gulf Hammock, Florida, an unincorporated community at one edge of the wetlands area
