= List of county roads in Marion County, Florida =

- County road shields used in Florida

Highway names
- Interstates: Interstate X (I-X)
- US Highways: U.S. Highway X (US X)
- State: State Road X (SR X)
- County: County Road X (CR X)

System links
- County roads in Florida; County roads in Marion County

The following is a list of county roads in Marion County, Florida. All county roads are maintained by the county in which they reside.

== County routes in Marion County ==
#	Road Name(s)	Direction and Termini					Notes
CR 21		S–N	CR 315	Orange Springs	CR 21	Putnam County line north-northwest of Orange Springs	former SR 21
CR 25	SE 110 Street	S–N	CR 25 / SE 180 Street	Lake County line south-southwest of Weirsdale	SR 25 / SR 35 / Baseline Road	Belleview	Former SR 25
CR 25A	NW Gainesville Road NW Gainesville Road; NW 16th Avenue	W–E S–N S–N	US 27 / US 441 (SR 25 / SR 500) US 301 / US 441 (SR 25 / SR 200) Dead end	Belleview Ocala North of Ocala	CR 25 35th Street US 441 (SR 25)	East of Belleview North of Ocala North-northwest of Reddick	Former SR 25A
CR 35	NE 55 Avenue; NE 55 Avenue Road; NE 58 Avenue	S–N	SR 35 / SR 40	Silver Springs	NE 90 Street Road / NE 97 Street Road	Indian Lake State Forest north-northeast of Silver Springs	Extension of SR 35; FDOT inventories the route as part of SR 35, but it is signed as CR 35.
CR 40	Cedar Street	W–E	CR 40	Levy County line west of Dunnellon	US 41 (SR 45) / CR 336 / CR 484	Dunnellon	Former SR 40
CR 42		W–E	South Magnolia Avenue	West of Pedro	CR 42	Lake County line in Ocala National Forest east-southeast of Linadale	Former SR 42
CR 200A	NW 20th Street; NE Jacksonville Road	S–N	US 301 / US 441 (SR 25 / SR 200)	Ocala	US 301 (SR 25)	South-southwest of Citra	Former SR 200A
CR 225		S–N	US 27 (SR 500)	Southeast of Fellowship	CR 318	Irvine	Former SR 225
CR 225A	SW 80th Avenue; NW 70 Avenue Road	S–N	SR 40 / SW 80 Avenue	West of Ocala	CR 329	South-southeast of Fairfield	Former SR 225A
CR 301 (former)	Northeast 160th Avenue Road	S–N	CR 316	Ocala National Forest east-northeast of Fort McCoy			Former SR 301
CR 312	SW 87 Place	W–E	CR 475A	South of Ocala	CR 475	South of Ocala	Former SR 312
CR 314	NE 7 Street, Sharpe's Ferry Road	W–E	SR 35 / NE 7 Street	East of Ocala	SR 19	Salt Springs	Former SR 314
CR 314A	SE 95 Street Road	S–N	SE 183 Avenue Road / SE 95 Street Road	Ocala National Forest east-southeast of Moss Bluff	CR 314	Ocala National Forest east of Cedar Creek	Former SR 314A
CR 315		S–N	SR 40	East of Silver Springs	CR 315	Putnam County line northeast of Orange Springs	Former SR 315
CR 316		W–E	US 27 (SR 500) US 301 (SR 200) CR 200A	West-southwest of Fairfield North-northwest of Sparr North-northwest of Sparr	US 301 (SR 200) CR 200A SR 19 / NE 142 Place Road	North-northwest of Sparr North-northwest of Sparr Ocala National Forest in Salt Springs	Former SR 316
CR 318		W–E	CR 318 / CR 335	Levy County line in East Williston	CR 315	South-southwest of Orange Springs	Former SR 318
CR 320	Northwest Highway 320; Avenue G	W–E	Levy-Marion County Line.		US 441		former SR 320
CR 326		W–E	Levy-Marion County Line.		I-75 / SR 326		former SR 326
CR 328		W–E	Levy-Marion County Line.		SR 40		former SR 328
CR 328		W–E	CR 475		US 27–301–441		former SR 328
CR 329		S–N	CR 200A		Marion-Alachua County Line.		former SR 329
CR 335		S–N	US 27		Levy-Marion County Line		former SR 335
CR 336		W–E	Levy-Marion County Line.		US 41 @ CR 484	Dunnellon	former SR 336; Overlaps CR 40
CR 450		W–E	CR 42		Marion-Lake County Line.		former SR 450
CR 452		W–E	CR 42		Marion-Lake County Line.		former SR 452
CR 464		W–E	SR 35 @ SR 464		SR 25		former SR 464
CR 464A		S–N	US 27–301–441			Ocala.	former SR 464A inventoried by FDOT as part of CR 4183
CR 464B		W–E	Levy-Marion County Line		US 27		former SR 464
CR 464C		W–E	SR 25		CR 314A & Southeast 95th Street	Cedar Creek(Ocala National Forest)	former SR 464
CR 467		S–N					former SR 467
CR 475		S–N	Sumter-Marion County Line		US 27–301–441	Ocala	former SR 475
CR 475A		S–N	CR 475		SR 200		former SR 475A
CR 475B		W–E	CR 475A		CR 475		former SR 475B
CR 475C		S–N	CR 475A		SR 200		former SR 475C
CR 484		W–E	US 41, CR 40 & CR 336	Dunnellon	US 27–301–441	Belleview	former SR 484
CR 500A	NW 30th Avenue	S-N	SR 40	Ocala	US 27 (SR 500)	Ocala	former SR 500A

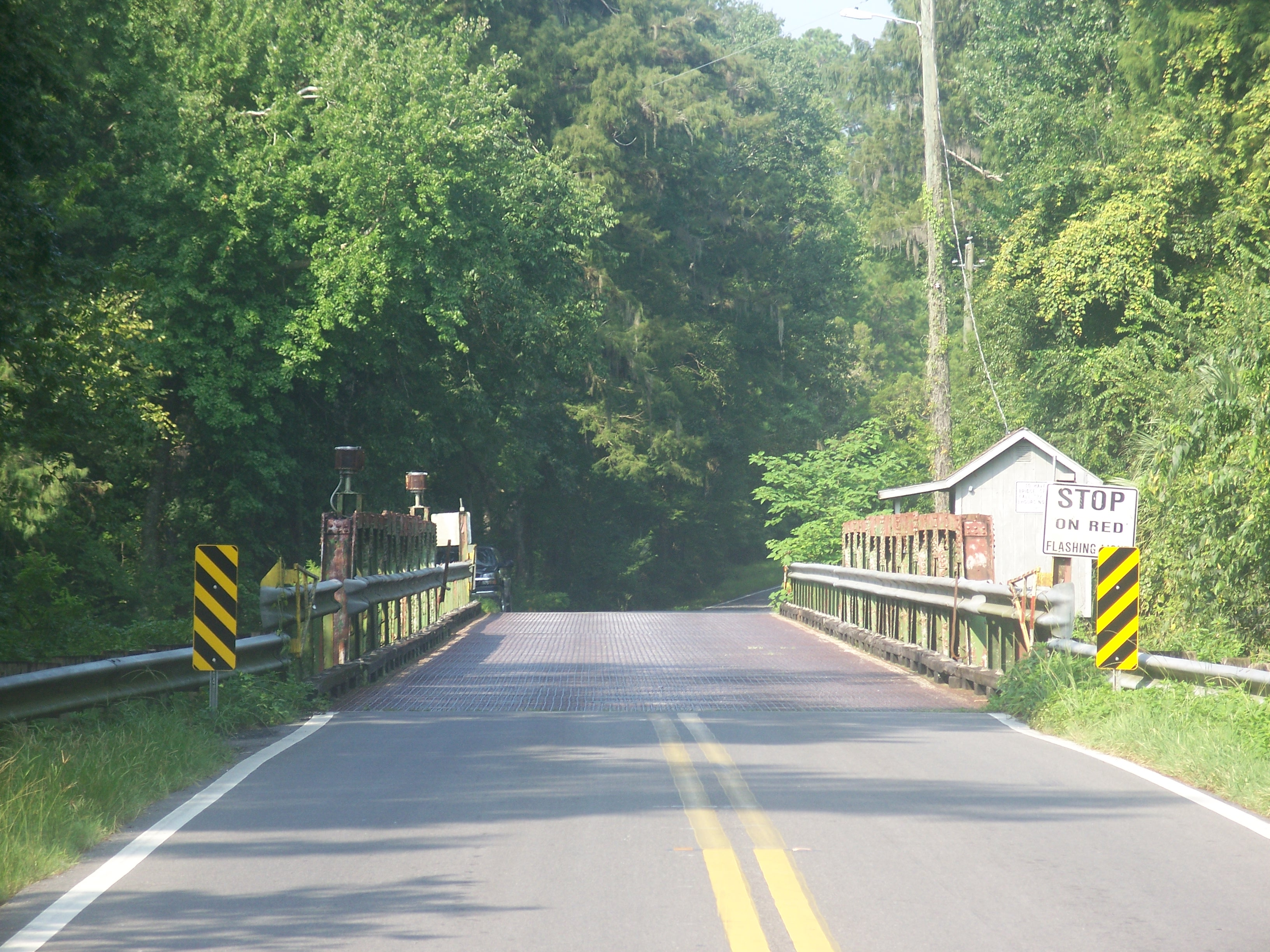
Sharpes Ferry bridge over the Ocklawaha River, on CR 314 in 2007.
