= Goethe State Forest =

State forest in Florida, United States

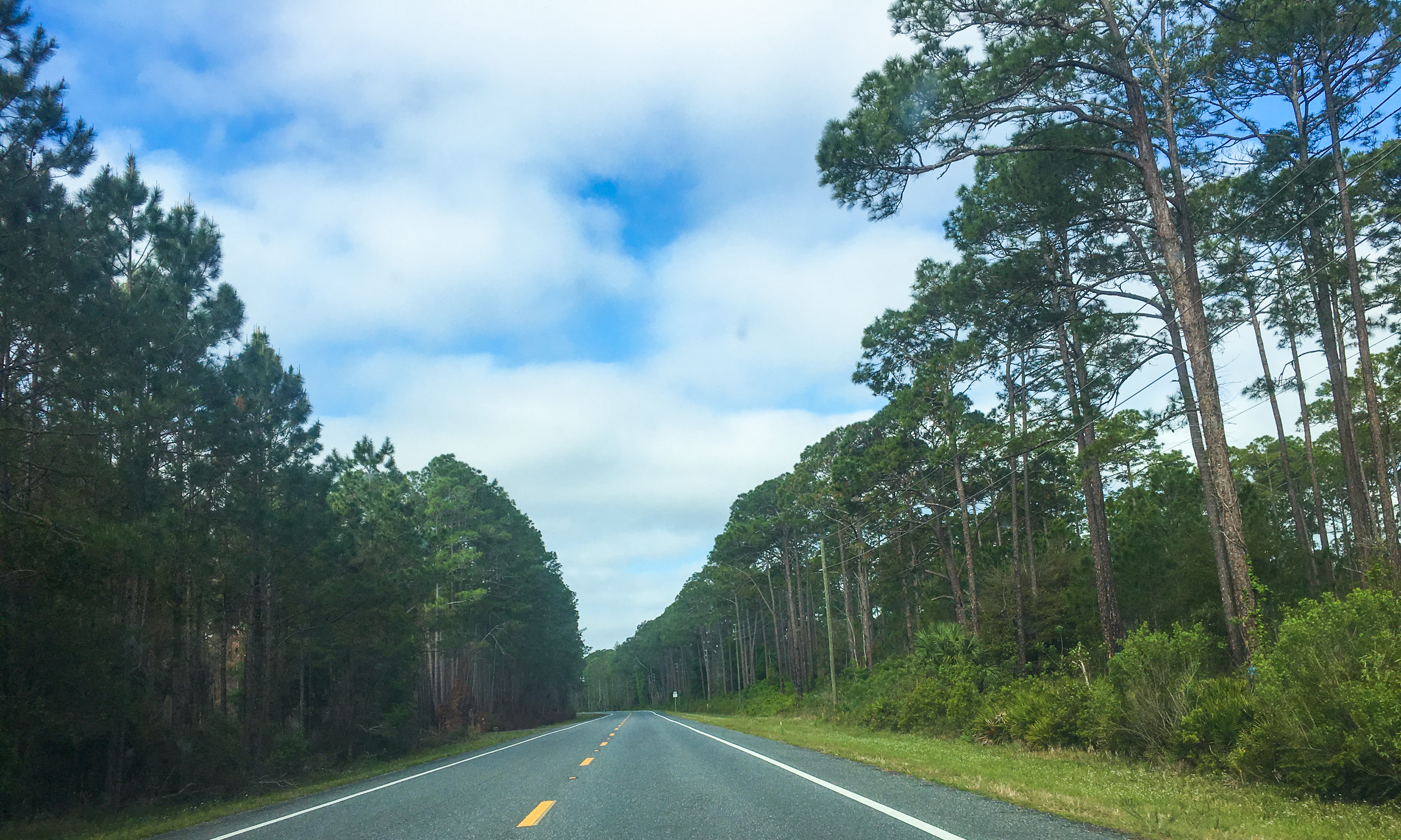
- Goethe State Forest as seen from FL 121 westbound, March 2019

- Location within Florida Location within the United States
- Location: Levy and Alachua counties, Florida, U.S.
- Nearest city: Dunnellon
- Coordinates: 29°13′07″N 82°34′39″W
- Area: 76,162 acres (30,822 ha)
- Administrator: Florida Department of Agriculture and Consumer Services

The Goethe State Forest is in the U.S. state of Florida. The 76,162-acre (308 km^{2}) forest is located near the gulf coast, northwest of Dunnellon. Four trailheads are located on County Road 337. The main trail usage is equestrian, both riders and carts. Goethe is known for its population of red cockaded woodpeckers, a rare bird endemic to the longleaf pine forests of the southeastern coastal plain.

== History ==
The forest was established in 1992 and named for James Tillinghast Goethe, a local lumber company owner who sold most of his land to the state for conservation. Other tracts of the land were purchased separately from 2010-2025.

The main tract of the forest is also co-managed by the Florida Fish and Wildlife Conservation Commission, which declares it the Goethe Wildlife Management Area. The Watermelon Pond tracts were purchased by the FWC in 2007 and merged with the forest in 2010.

Nearby wildlife management areas assisting in the preservation of land in southwestern Levy County includes Gulf Hammock Wildlife Management Area, Waccasassa Bay Preserve State Park, Lower Waccasassa Conservation Area, Cedar Key Scrub State Reserve, and Devils Hammock Wildlife Management Area.

== Natural features ==
The forest contains 19 natural communities, including mesic flatwoods, dome swamps, sandhills, and basin swamps. Scattered old-growth cypress trees remain, including the Goethe Giant.

== Gallery ==
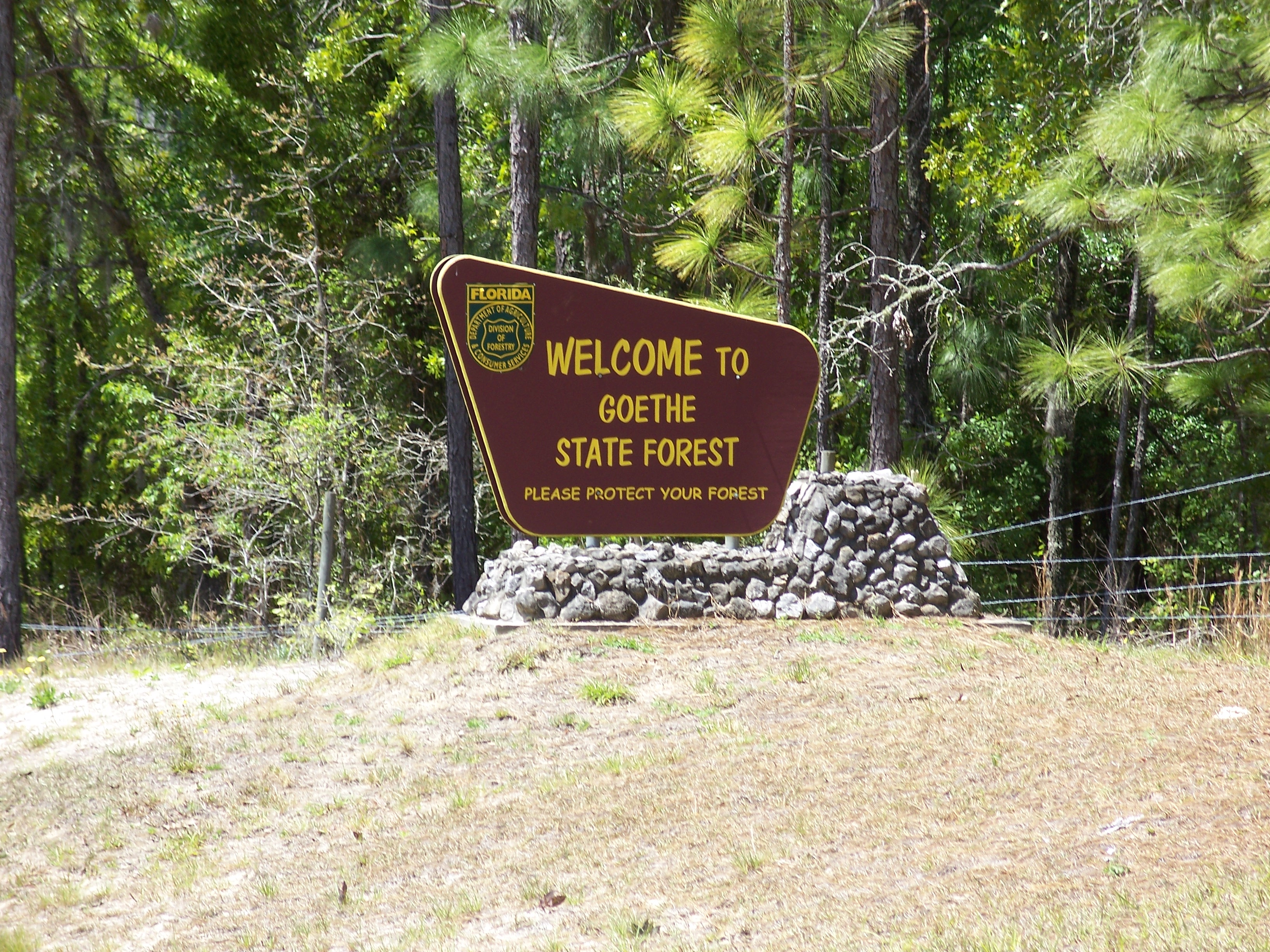
Eastern entrance

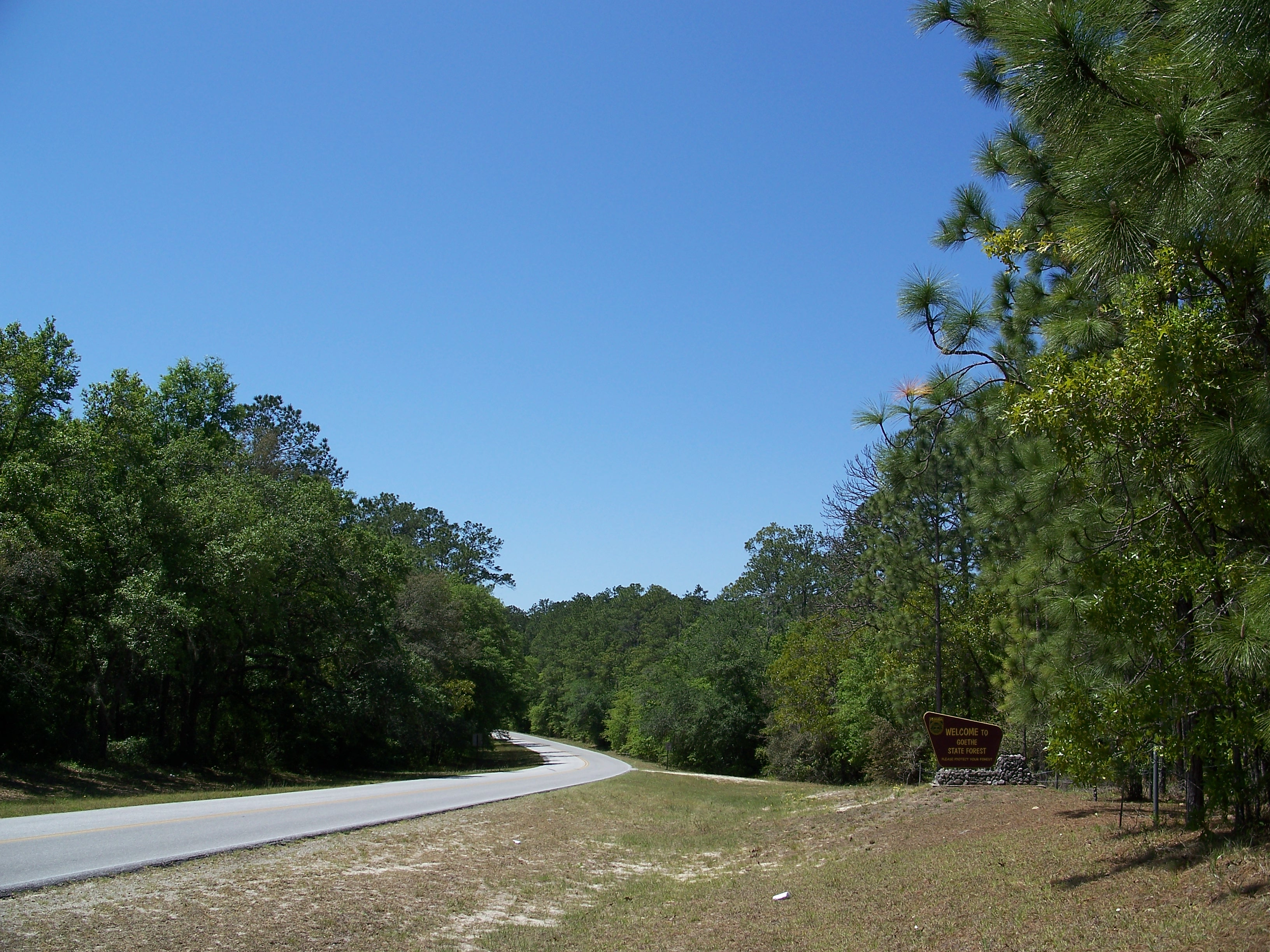
SR 326 into the forest

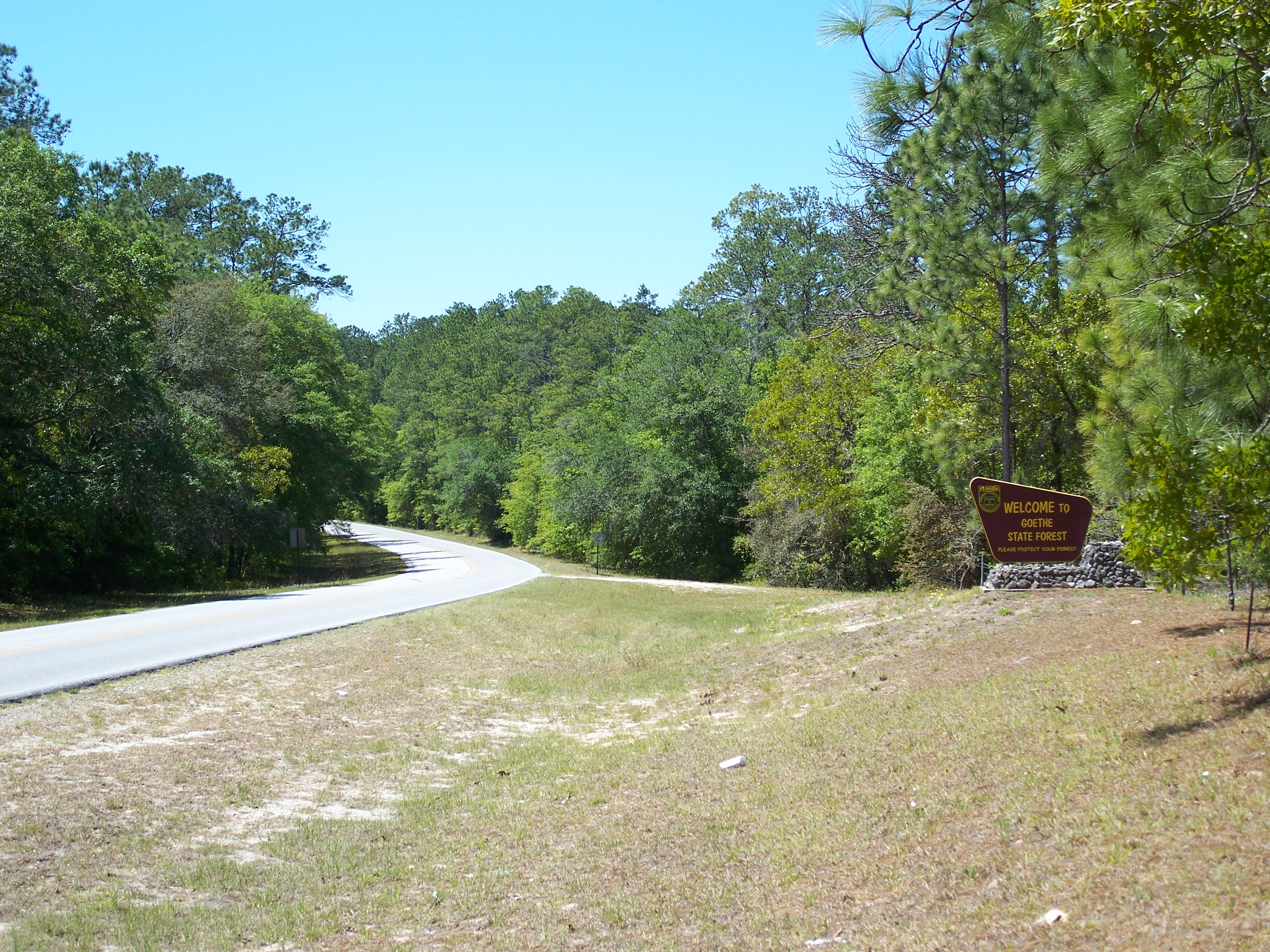
SR 326 into the forest

== See also ==
- List of Florida state forests
- List of Florida state parks
