= Zuber, Florida =

Unincorporated community in Florida, U.S.

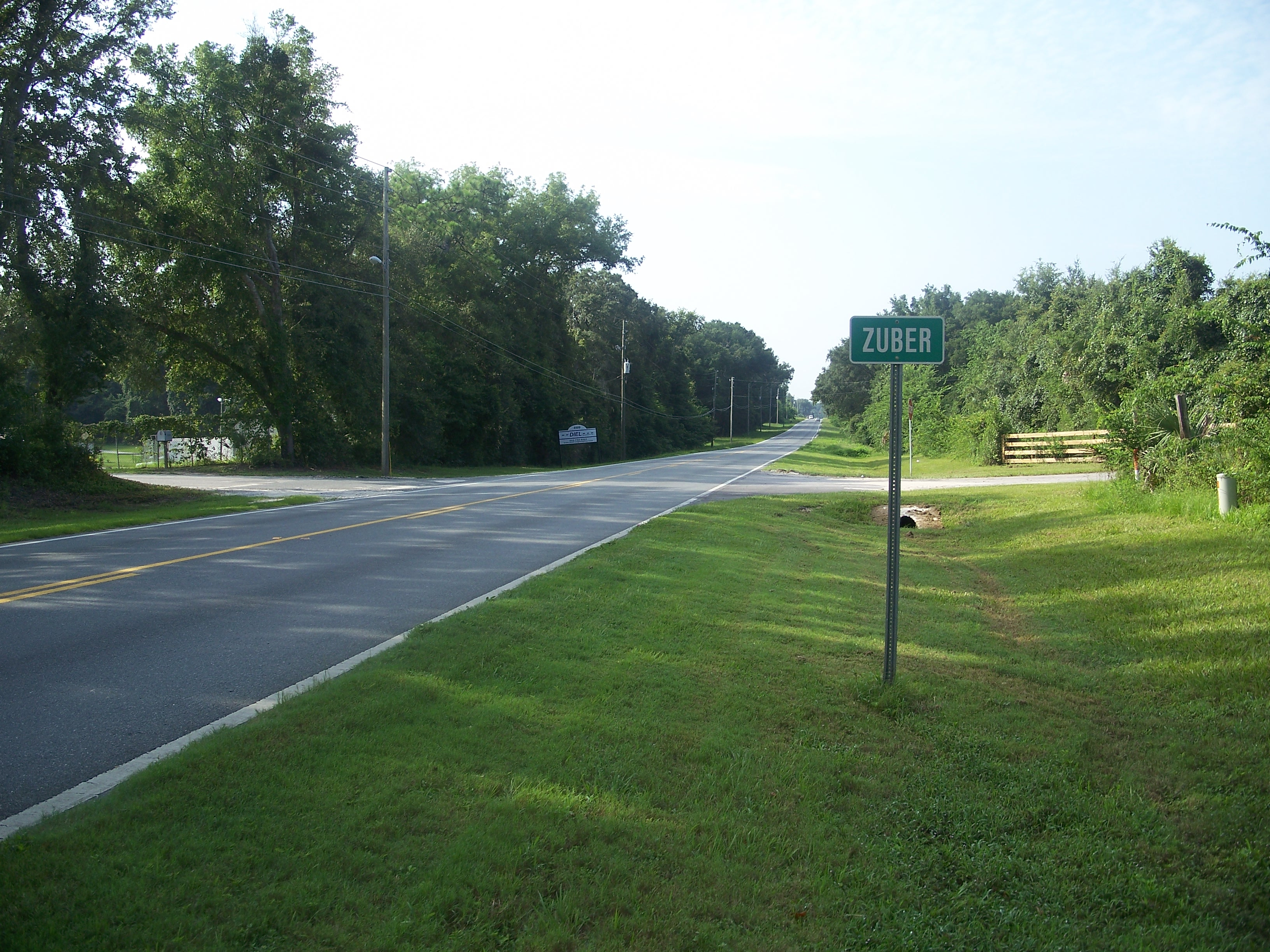
Looking south along CR 25A through Zuber

Zuber is an unincorporated community in Marion County, Florida, United States. The intersection of State Road 326 and County Road 25A is located nearby. The community's commerce is supported by its proximity to Interstate 75.

The community is part of the Ocala Metropolitan Statistical Area.

== Notable person ==
- Ruby (Jackson) McCollum- She was born and grew up in Zuber. A wealthy African-American woman, she was notable for being convicted in 1952 in the shooting death of C. Leroy Adams, a wealthy white doctor in Live Oak, Florida, where she and her husband Sam lived.

== Geography ==
Zuber is located at 29°16′01″N 82°10′52″W.
