= Fort McCoy, Florida =

Fort McCoy
- Unincorporated community
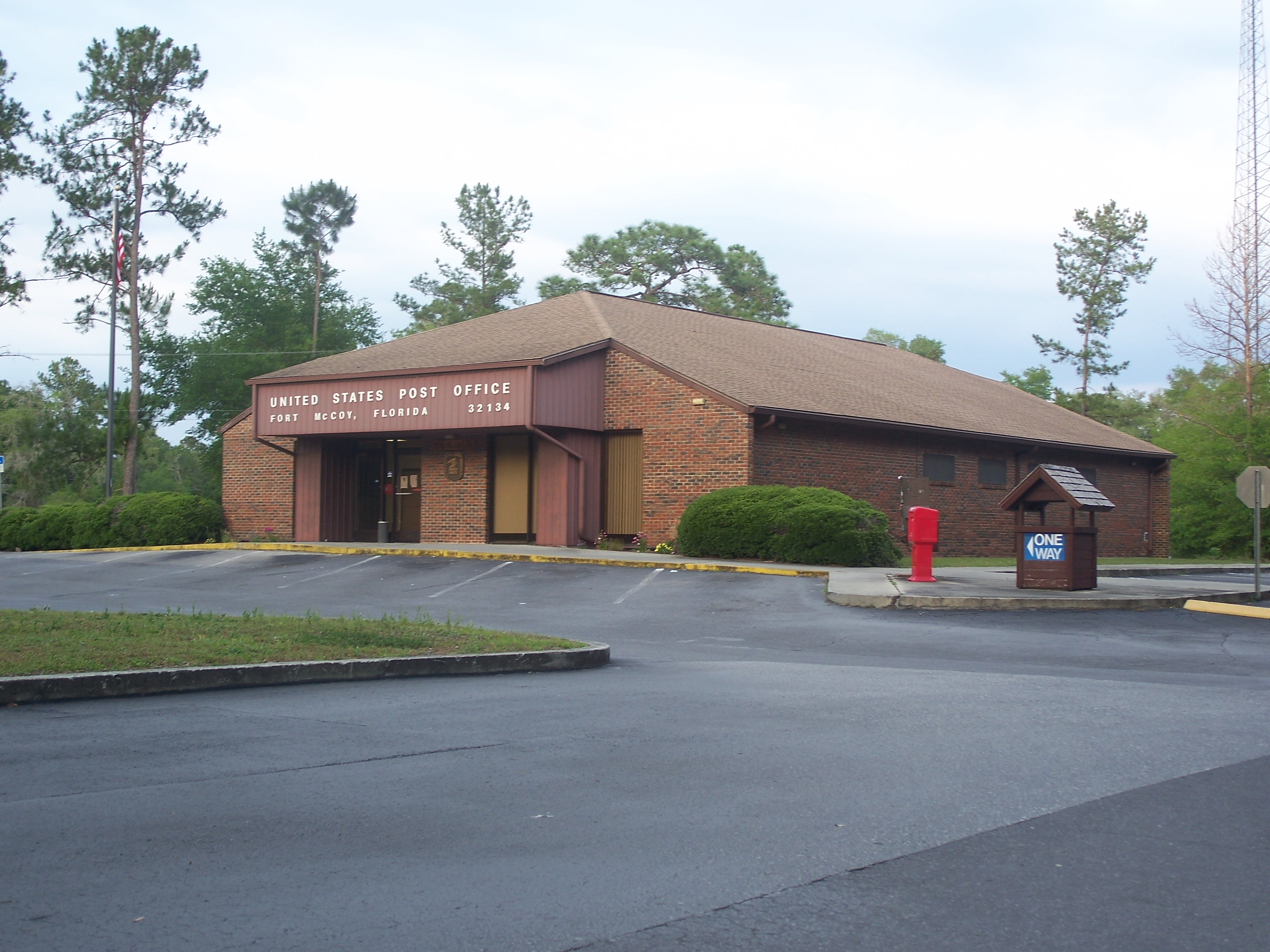
- Fort McCoy Post Office
- Nickname: Ft. McCoy
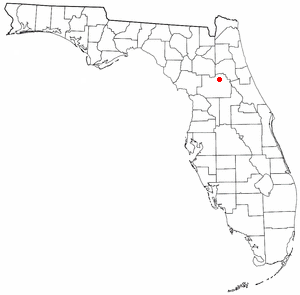
- Location in the state of Florida

- Location in the United States
- Country: United States
- State: Florida
- County: Marion
- Time zone: UTC-5 (Eastern (EST))
  - Summer (DST): UTC-4 (EDT)
- ZIP code: 32134
- Area code: 352

Fort McCoy is an unincorporated community in Marion County, Florida, United States. It is situated northeast of Ocala and lies between the towns of Sparr and Eureka on County Road 316 and is directly north of Silver Springs on County Road 315. The community is part of the Ocala Metropolitan Statistical Area.

== Geography ==
Fort McCoy is located at 29°21′52″N 81°57′59″W. The community is located west of the Ocala National Forest.

== History ==
Fort McCoy was originally named Fort Mackay. MacKay and MacCoy were settlers in the area who were killed by Indians during the war. The town of Fort McCoy is named after the settler Jeb MacCoy but spelled differently. When hostilities with Native Americans worsened, Jeb MacCoy was killed by Indians while bringing his family into Fort Russell. Captain Mackay was head of the local militia, and was killed while surveying Itonia Scrub on March 20, 1839.

== Education ==
The first school in Fort McCoy was supposedly a log cabin which was built near the fort; and it is thought to have been abandoned during the Second Seminole War. When the Union Church was built near the Fort McCoy Cemetery, it was used as the school, with church services on the weekends. Sometime between the 1890s and the first decade of the 1900s, a wooden building was built to serve as the school. In 1935, the building was destroyed in a fire. A small new school (to serve the approximate 75 pupils at the time) was built on the land donated by Dr. Percy F. Lisk, which was directly in front of the old schools location. The new brick school opened in 1936. The earliest known student grade levels are from the 1940s, when the school was known as Fort McCoy High School.

Fort McCoy High School was closed in 1963 and re-opened soon after as Fort McCoy Elementary School. The population of Fort McCoy increased over the years, and by the 1980s the property was a vast land full of "portable classrooms". Due to the population increase and age of the building (50 years old), the Marion County School Board decided to build a school in 1986. The original brick building was turned into the Fort McCoy Public Library in 1996, after a $60,000 renovation. In 1988, the campus opened, renamed as Fort McCoy School, which serves elementary and middle school students (Pre-K to Eighth grade). The campus is used today, with the same grade levels being served.

Most children from kindergarten through eighth grade attend Fort McCoy School. Most high school students in Fort McCoy attend North Marion High School in Citra, while some attend Lake Weir High School in Ocala.
