= Sparr, Florida =

Unincorporated community in Florida, U.S.

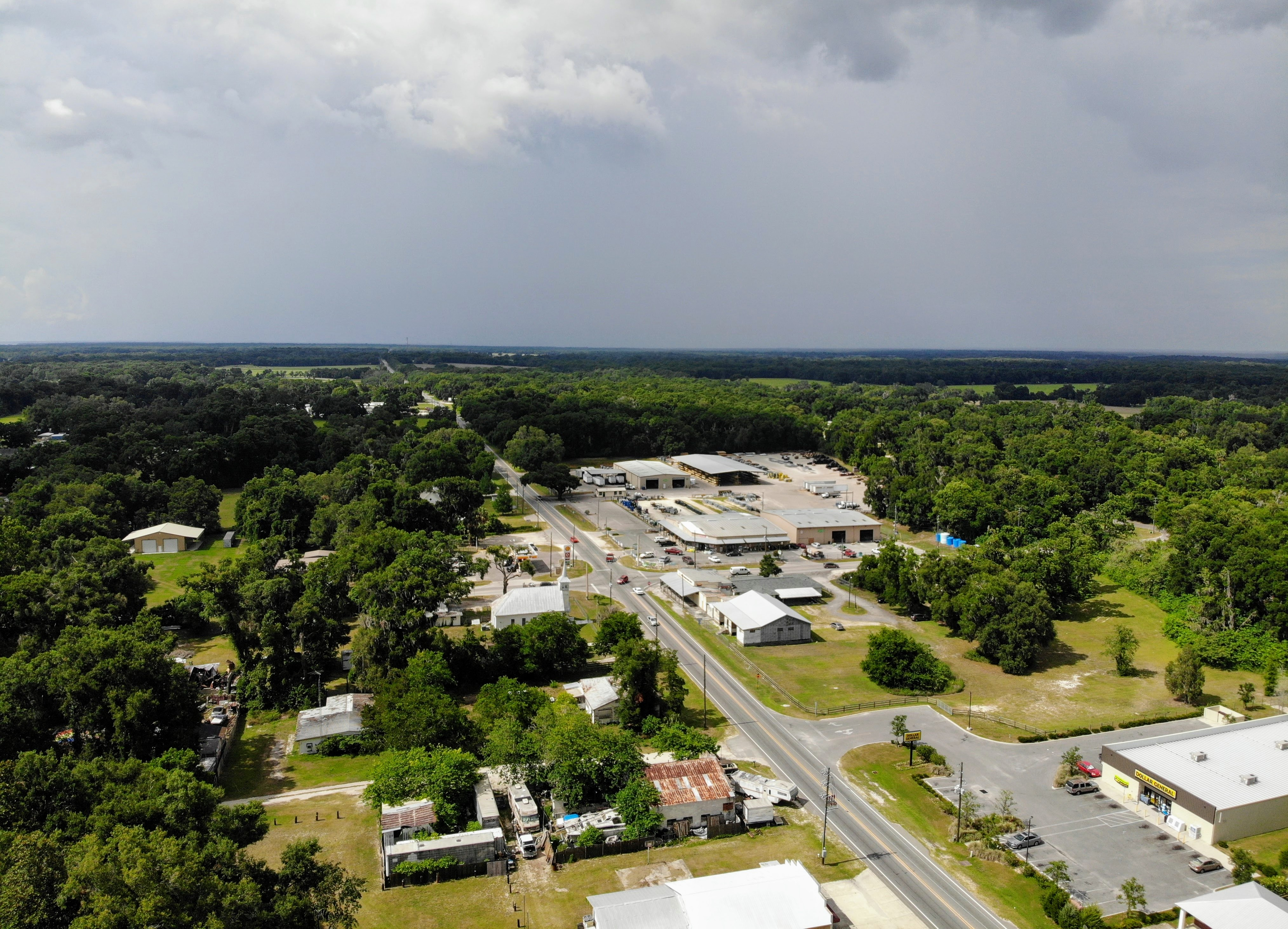
Aerial photo of Sparr, Florida

Sparr is an unincorporated community in Marion County, Florida, United States, located near the intersection of County Road 200A and County Road 329. The community is part of the Ocala Metropolitan Statistical Area.

== History ==
A post office called Sparr has been in operation since 1882. The place was originally named after Daniel Souter, a local land owner.

Within a year after establishment the Peninsula Railroad (now CSX Transportation's Wildwood Subdivision) which ran from Waldo to Ocala was built through the community.

== Geography ==
Sparr is located at 29°20′18″N 82°06′46″W (29.3383, -82.1128).
