= Fairfield, Florida =

- Unincorporated community
- Location within Florida Location within the United States
- Coordinates: 29°22′01″N 82°15′04″W
- Country: United States
- State: Florida
- County: Marion
- Elevation: 180 ft (55 m)
- Time zone: UTC-5 (Eastern (EST))
  - Summer (DST): UTC-4 (EDT)
- ZIP code: 32634
- Area code: 352
- GNIS feature ID: 282334

Fairfield is an unincorporated community in Marion County, Florida, United States. The community is located at the junction of County Roads 225 and 316, 3.25 miles (5.23 km) west of Reddick. Fairfield has a post office with ZIP code 32634.
