= Waccasassa Bay Preserve State Park =

State park in Florida, United States

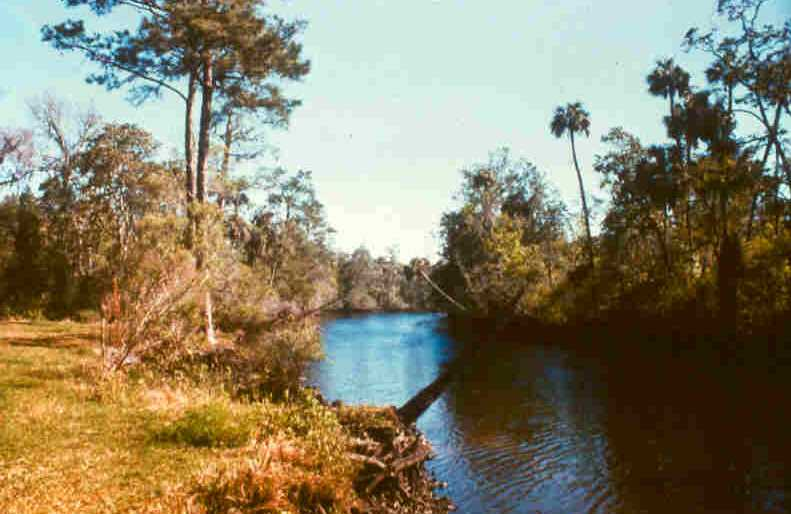
- Salt marsh and woodlands at Waccasassa Bay.

- Location within Florida Location within the United States
- Interactive map of Waccasassa Bay Preserve State Park
- Location: Levy County, Florida, United States
- Nearest city: Cedar Key, Florida
- Coordinates: 29.1429629830776°N 82.78862890309682°W
- Area: 30,784 acres (124.58 km^{2})
- Governing body: Florida Department of Environmental Protection

U.S. National Natural Landmark
- Designated: December 1976

Waccasassa Bay Preserve State Park is a 30,784-acre (124.58 km^{2}) salt marsh that stretches from Cedar Key to Yankee Town, and is only accessible by boat. It includes the part of Gulf Hammock wetlands area that is closest to the Gulf.

Some access points are from County Road 40 in Yankee Town, by boat down the Waccasassa River from the community of Gulf Hammock, and Cedar Key.

It is the home to numerous species of saltwater fish and shellfish, as well as many endangered and threatened species, including manatees, alligators, bald eagles and black bears. The bay is also the only known habitat for a highly endangered species of rodent, the Florida salt marsh vole (Microtus dukecampbelli).

== Hours ==
Florida state parks are open between 8 a.m. and sundown every day of the year (including holidays).
