= Irvine, Florida =

- Unincorporated community
- Location within Florida Location within the United States
- Coordinates: 29°24′20″N 82°15′04″W
- Country: United States
- State: Florida
- County: Marion
- Elevation: 157 ft (48 m)
- Time zone: UTC-5 (Eastern (EST))
  - Summer (DST): UTC-4 (EDT)
- Area code: 352
- GNIS feature ID: 284601

Irvine is an unincorporated community in Marion County, Florida, United States, located along Interstate 75 northwest of Ocala in the vicinity of County Roads 318 and 225.

The community is part of the Ocala Metropolitan Statistical Area.
