= Wekiva River (Waccasassa River tributary) =

River in Levy County, Florida, United States

The Wekiva River, also known as Wekiva Creek or Wekiva Run, is a tributary of the Waccasassa River in Levy County, Florida that originates at Wekiva Spring. From the spring the river meanders westward and then southward about 7 miles (11 km) to where it flows into the Waccasassa River. It is fed along the way by Mule Creek and the Little Wekiva River. The river is centrally located in the area between the Withlacoochee and Suwannee Rivers that is often referred to as the Gulf Hammock.

== Wekiva Spring ==
Wekiva Spring (29.2786°N 82.6564°W) is a second-magnitude spring in Levy County, Florida. The spring has two boils, with a discharge rate (measured June 30, 1997) of 26.28 cubic feet (0.744 m^{3}) per second (16.82 million US gallons [63.7 Ml]) per day. The water is discharged at a temperature of 73.2 °F (22.9 °C). The pool is about 110 feet (34 m) wide. An unnamed stream of about 70 feet (21 m) in length carries the discharge from the pool to a juncture with Black Prong Creek, forming the Wekiva River. The spring is on private land in Levy County, Florida. The area is rural and sparsely inhabited, and the land surrounding the spring is pine forest. Water from the spring is shipped by tanker truck to a bottling plant in Ocala, Florida.

== History ==
In 1877 Christopher Wingate and his wife Emma Wingate built the Gulf Hammock Hotel on land lying between the Wekiva and Little Wekiva Rivers. The hotel welcomed hunters, fishermen, and travelers from all over the world until 1905. One of the regular guests there was the American landscape painter Hermann Ottomar Herzog, who visited from about 1893 to 1905. Herzog painted over one hundred paintings in the Gulf Hammock area, including at least seven with the name "Wekiva" in the title.

Beginning c. 1890, many areas accessible via the Wekiva and Waccasassa River area were logged for cypress. The trees were floated down to Burns Landing on the Waccasassa, then rafted downstream to the Gulf of Mexico and up the coast to a sawmill at Lukens, near Cedar Key, Florida.

== See also ==
- List of rivers of Florida
- List of major springs in Florida
