= Waccasassa River =

River in Florida, United States of America

Coordinates: 29.5110765°N 82.704559°W

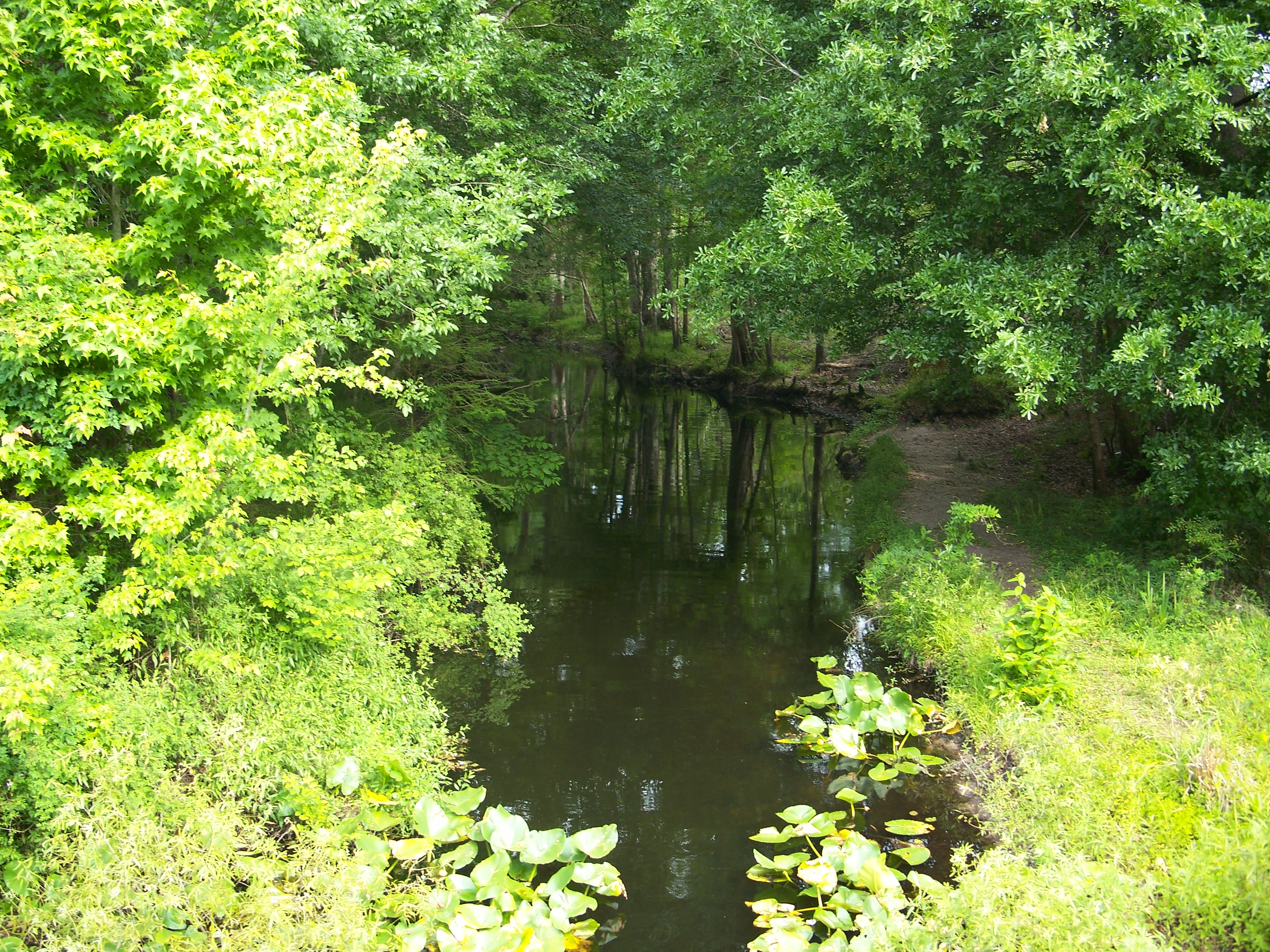
The Waccasassa River in Florida

The Waccasassa River is a small, isolated river in Levy County, Florida, flowing through the Gulf Hammock wetlands and emptying into the Gulf of Mexico. The river is 29 miles (47 km) long, and has a drainage basin of 610 square miles (1,600 km^{2}). Three-quarters of the river is accessible only by canoe or kayak.

The average flow of the river near the town of Gulf Hammock during 1964–74 was 345 cubic feet per second (9.8 m^{3}/s). Its tributaries include the Wekiva River and Otter Creek. Cow Creek joins the Waccasassa River just before its mouth opens out into the Gulf. Blue Springs, on the upper reaches of the Waccasassa River near Bronson, accounted for about 2.5 percent of the water flow of the river in 1964–74. The river above Blue Springs does not flow year-round. Wekiva Springs, on the Wekiva River, provided about 16 percent of the water flow of the Waccasassa River in 1964–74. Water flow in the Waccasassa River is affected by tides to above the town of Gulf Hammock.

The Waccasassa is one of the most underdeveloped rivers in Florida. For most of its length it is surrounded by state owned or paper company owned land. Paper companies are generally required to leave an unharvested border along navigable waterways. The mouth is protected by the Waccasassa Bay State Preserve Park.

== Gallery ==
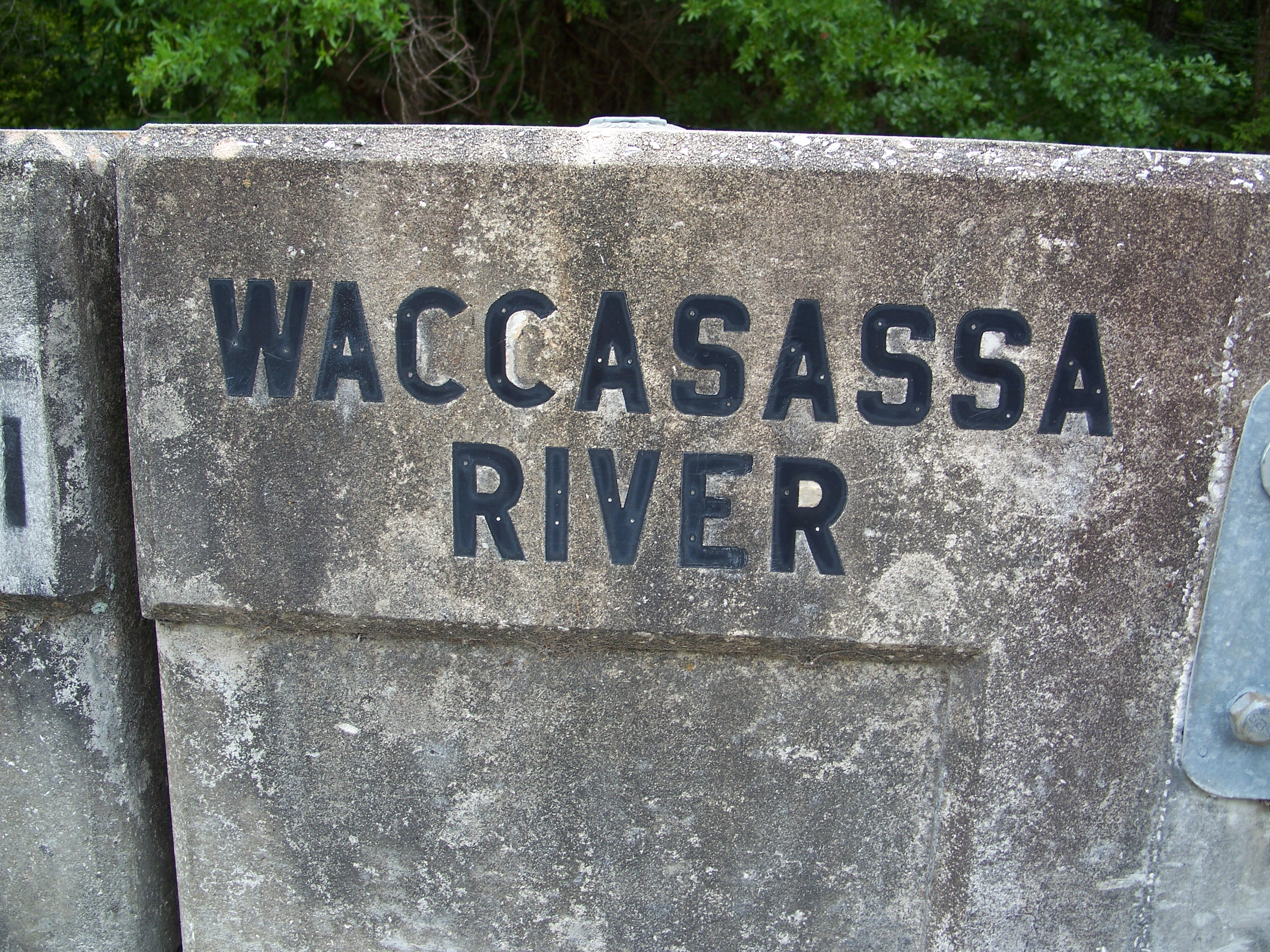
Bridge over the river on SR 24, between Bronson and Cedar Key

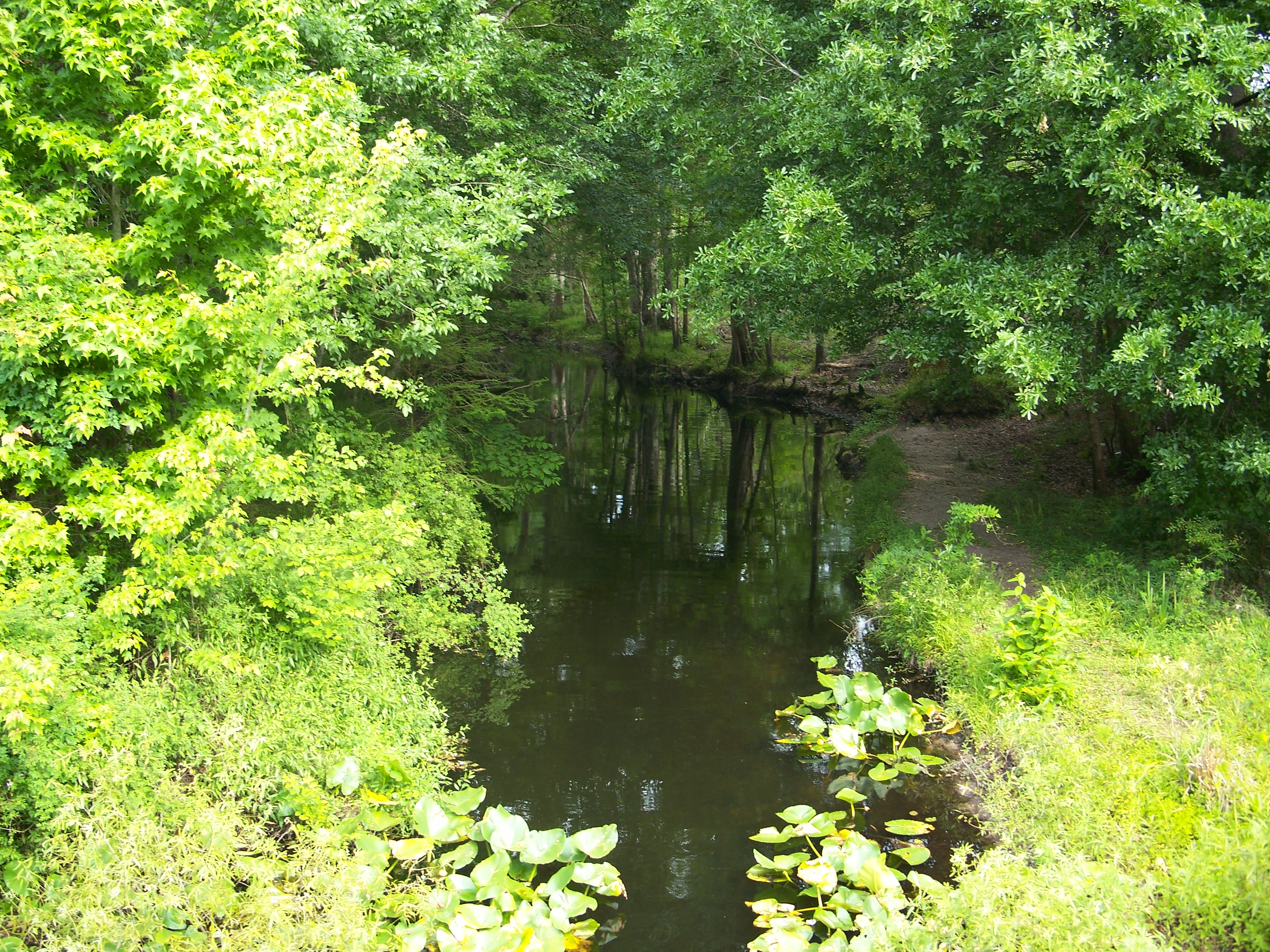

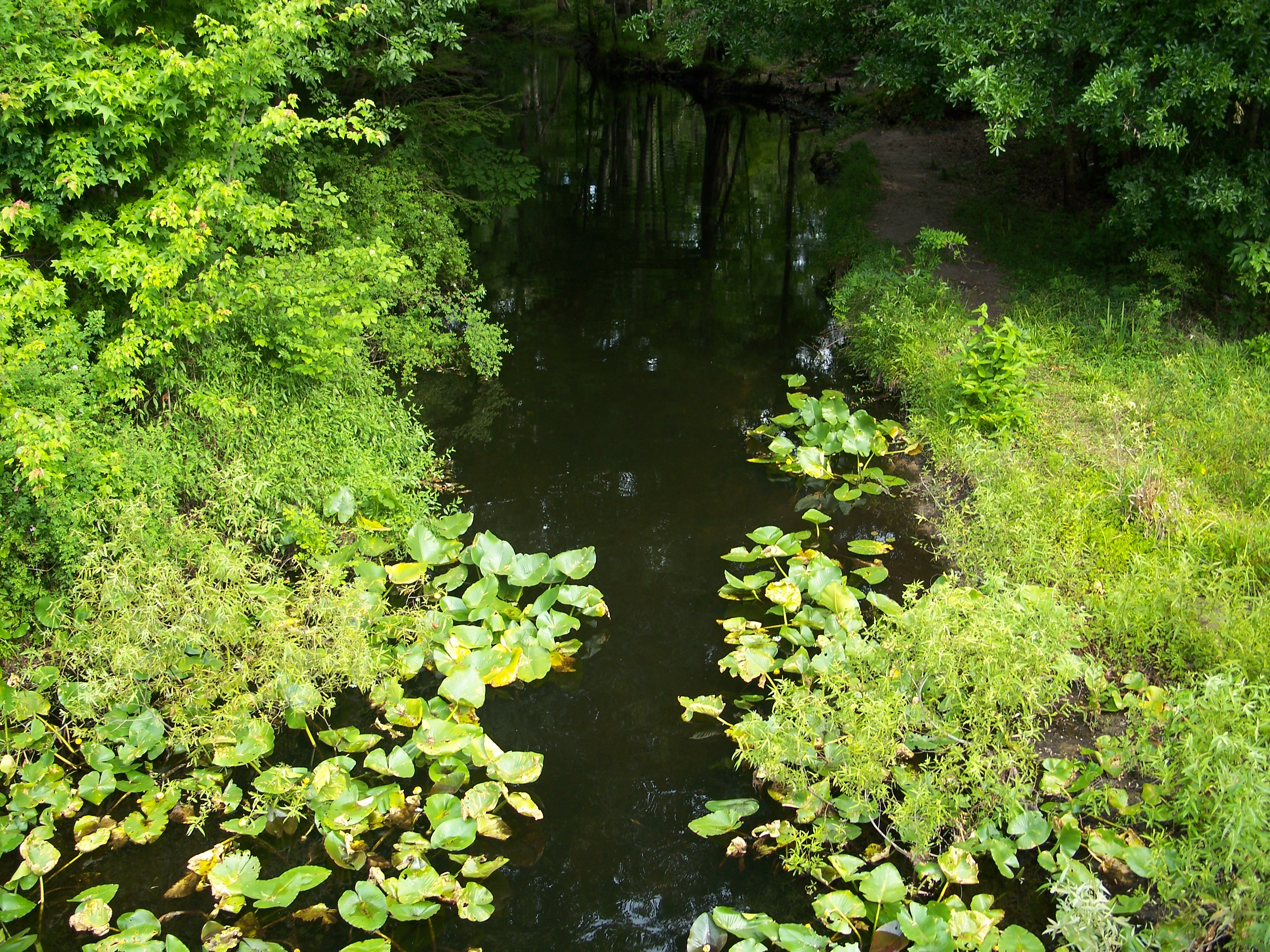

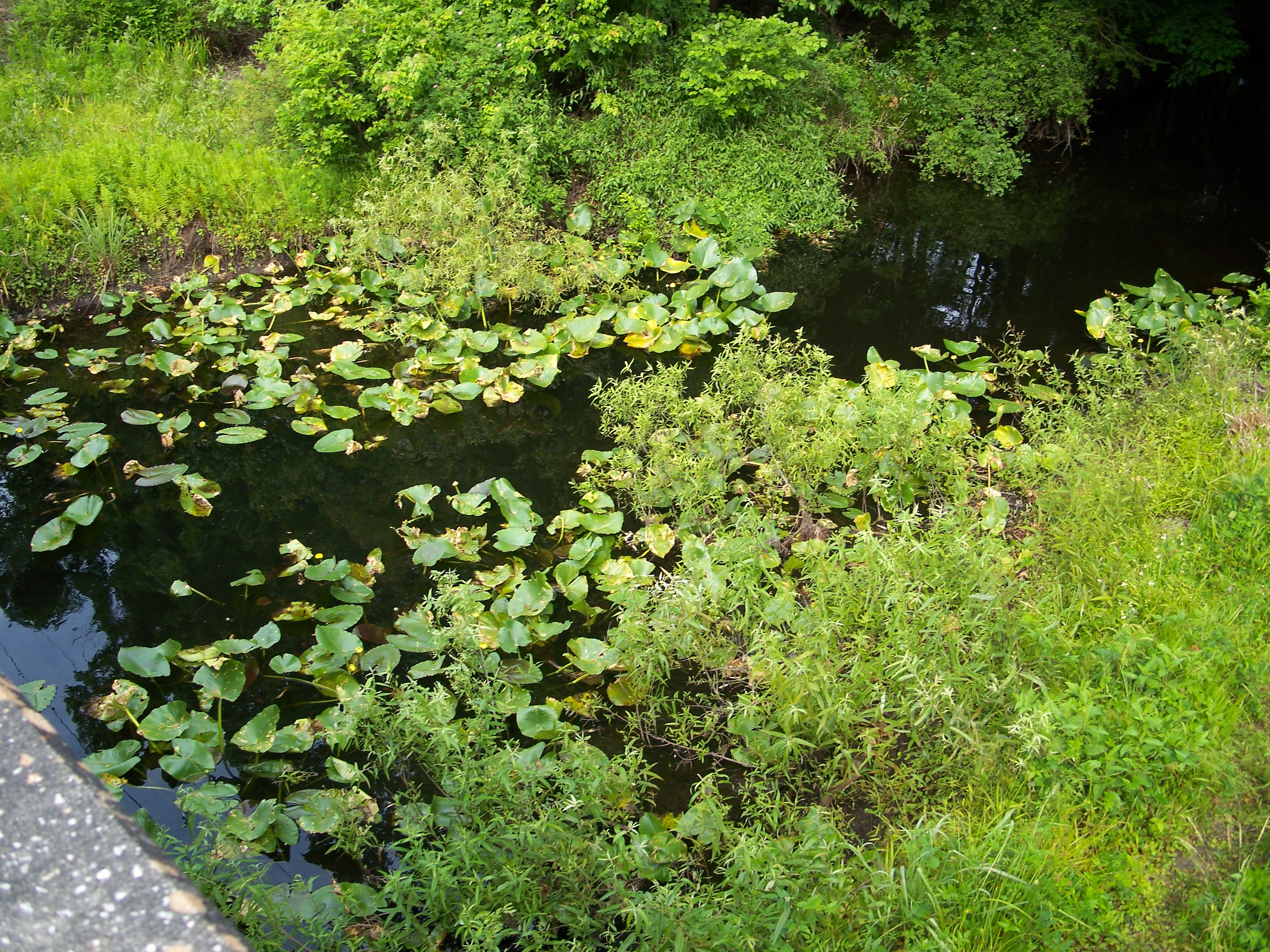

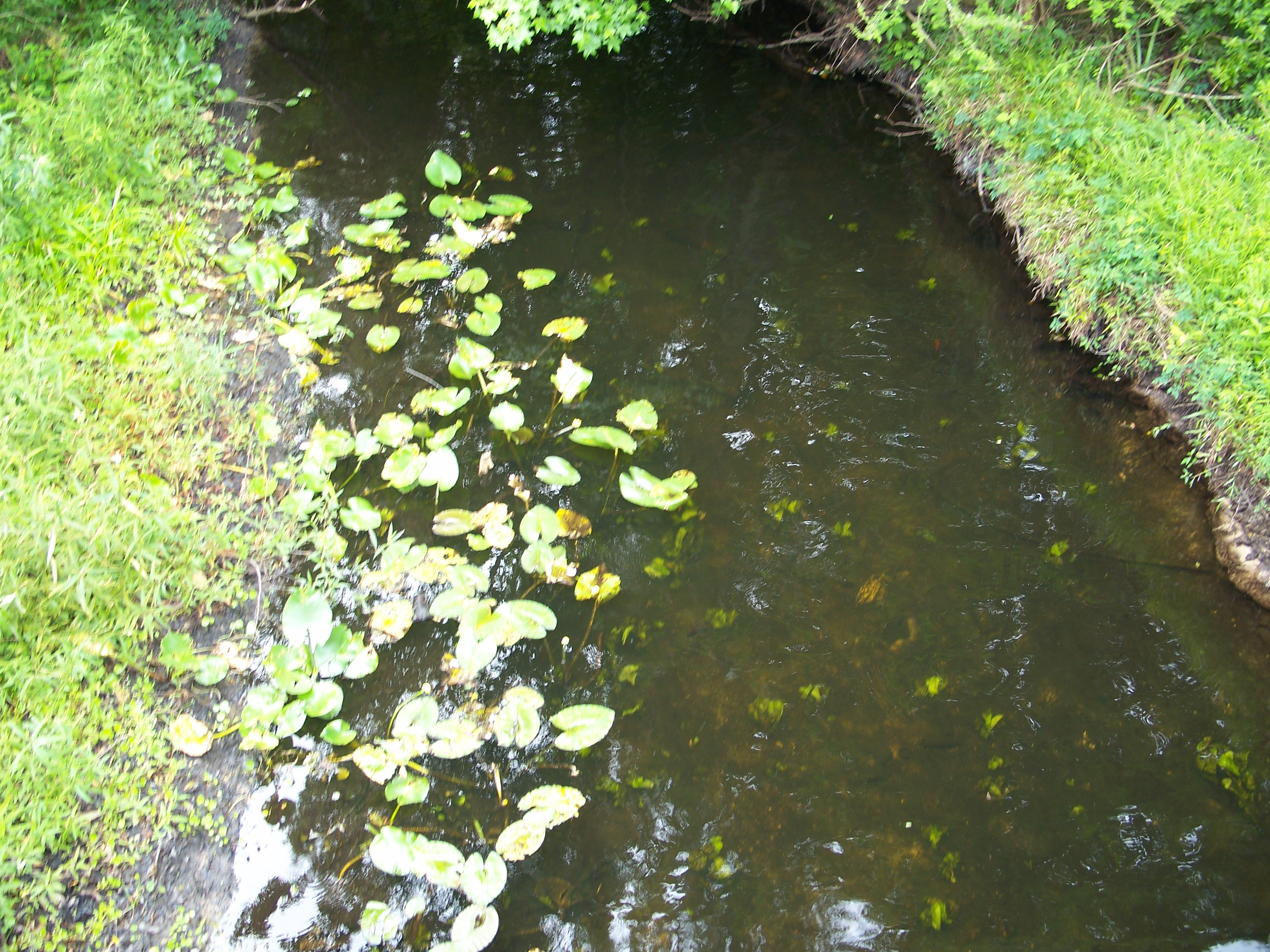
