= Cedar Key Scrub State Reserve =

State park in Florida, United States

- IUCN category V (protected landscape/seascape)
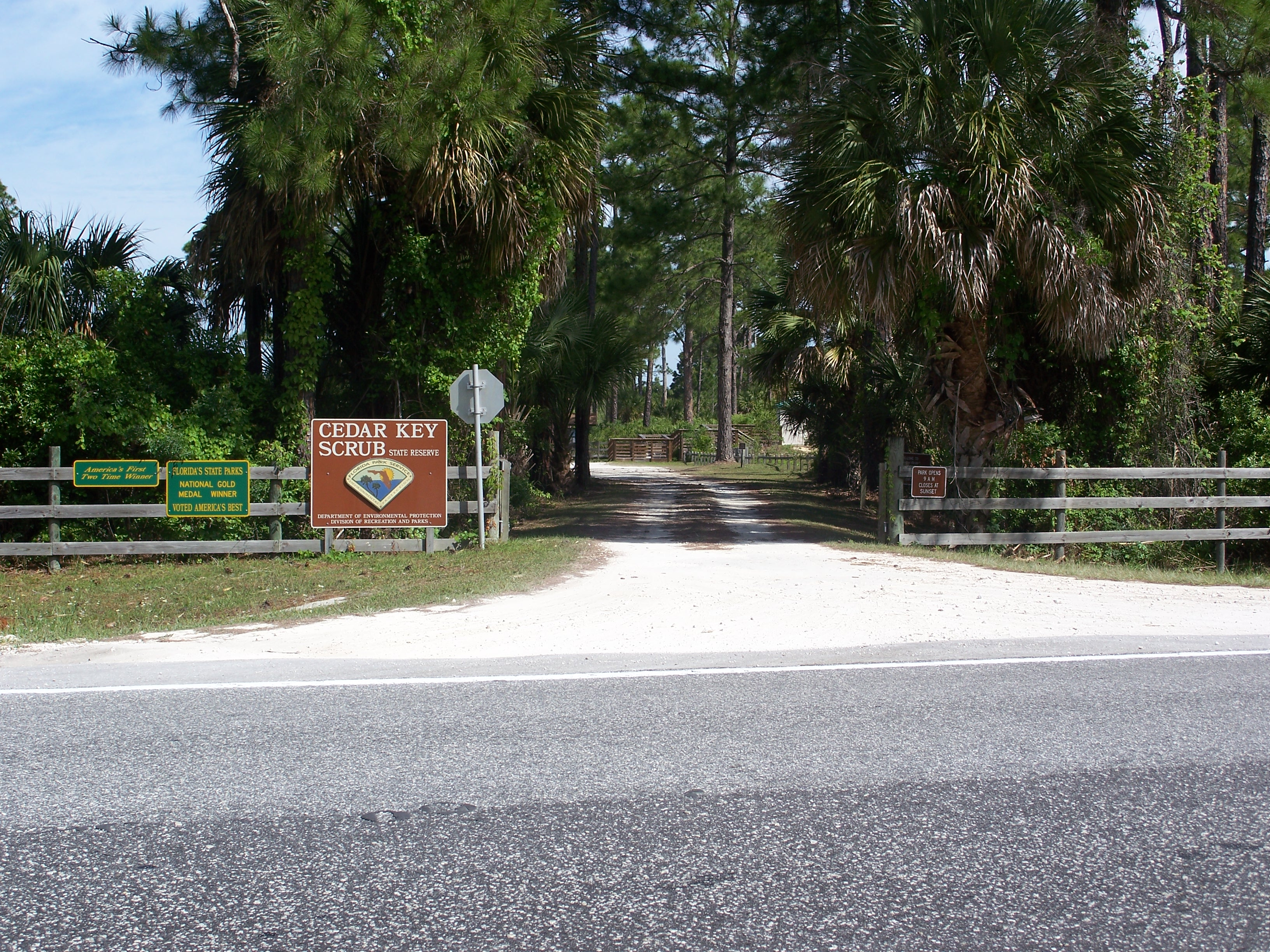
- Entryway

- Location within Florida Location within the United States
- Interactive map of Cedar Key Scrub State Reserve
- Location: Levy County, Florida, USA
- Nearest city: Cedar Key, Florida
- Coordinates: 29°11′21″N 83°2′4″W
- Area: 5,028 acres (20 km^{2})
- Governing body: Florida Department of Environmental Protection

The Cedar Key Scrub State Reserve is a Florida State Park, located six miles (10 km) northeast of Cedar Key on State Road 24.

== Overview ==
The reserve’s scrub vegetation includes sand pines and three oak species: myrtle oak, Chapman’s oak, and sand live oak. Prescribed fire and mechanical vegetation management are used to maintain its scrub and scrubby flatwoods.

=== Recreation ===
Recreational activities include hunting, wildlife viewing, hiking, bicycling, horseback riding, and picnicking. The annual December Geminid meteor shower is visible from the reserve.

=== Admission and Hours ===
There is no entrance charge. Florida state parks are open between 8 a.m. and sundown every day of the year (including holidays).

=== Wildlife ===
The wetlands at Cedar Key provide habitat for roseate spoonbills, wood storks, and amphibians such as one-toed amphibians. Drier areas support Florida mice, gopher frogs, indigo snakes, and Florida scrub-jay.

== Gallery ==
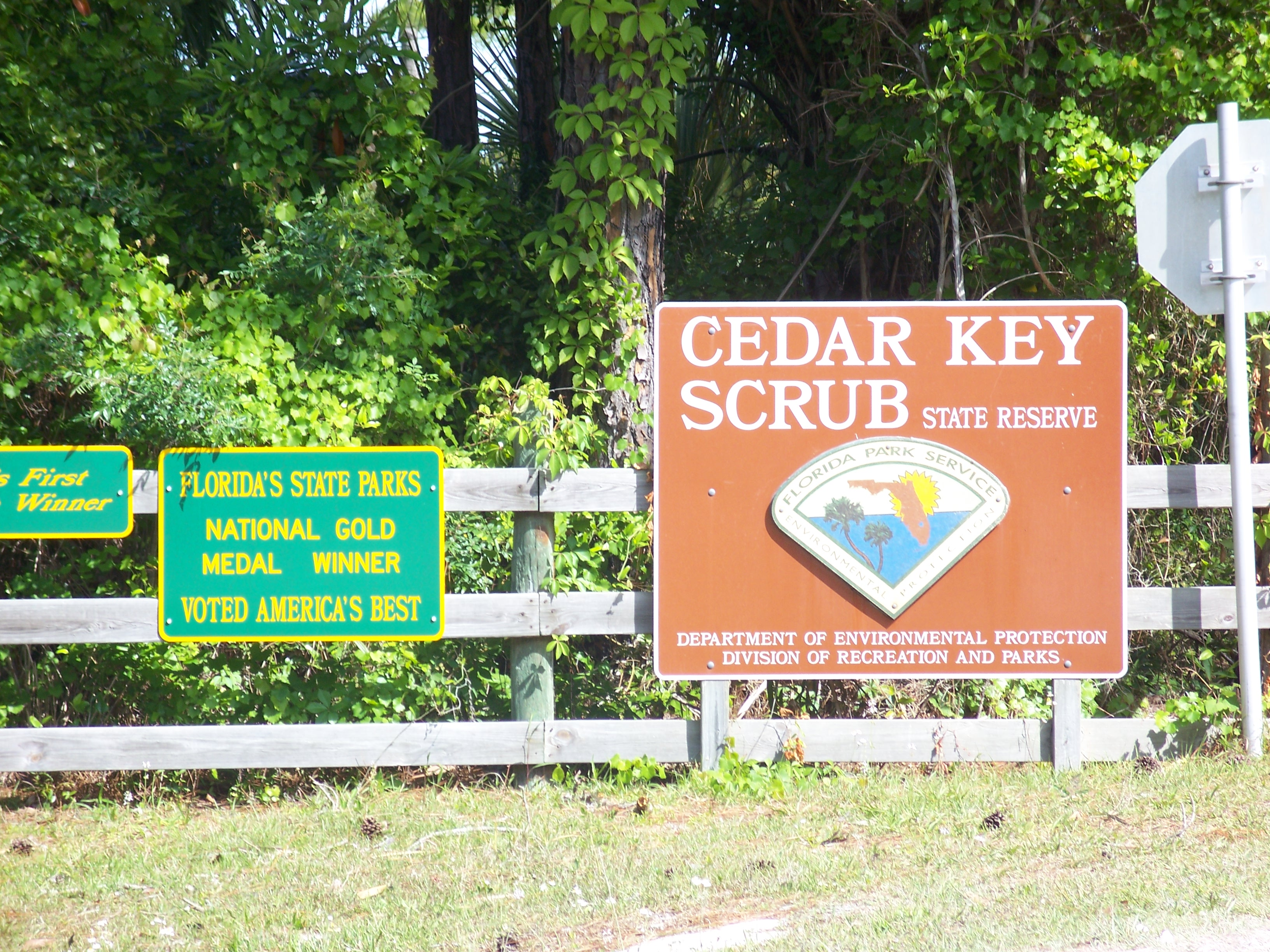
Another view of the entrance

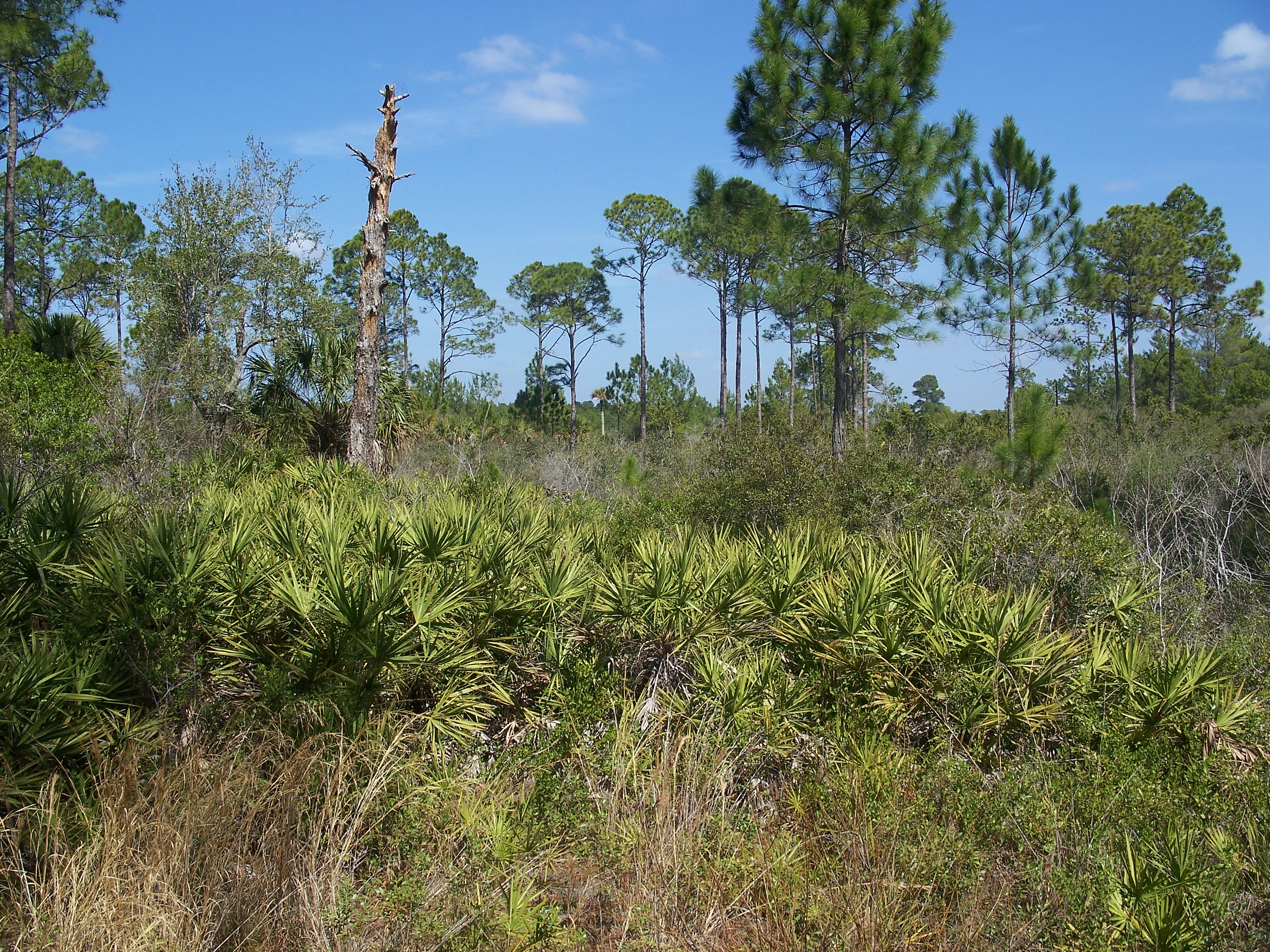
Wooded area

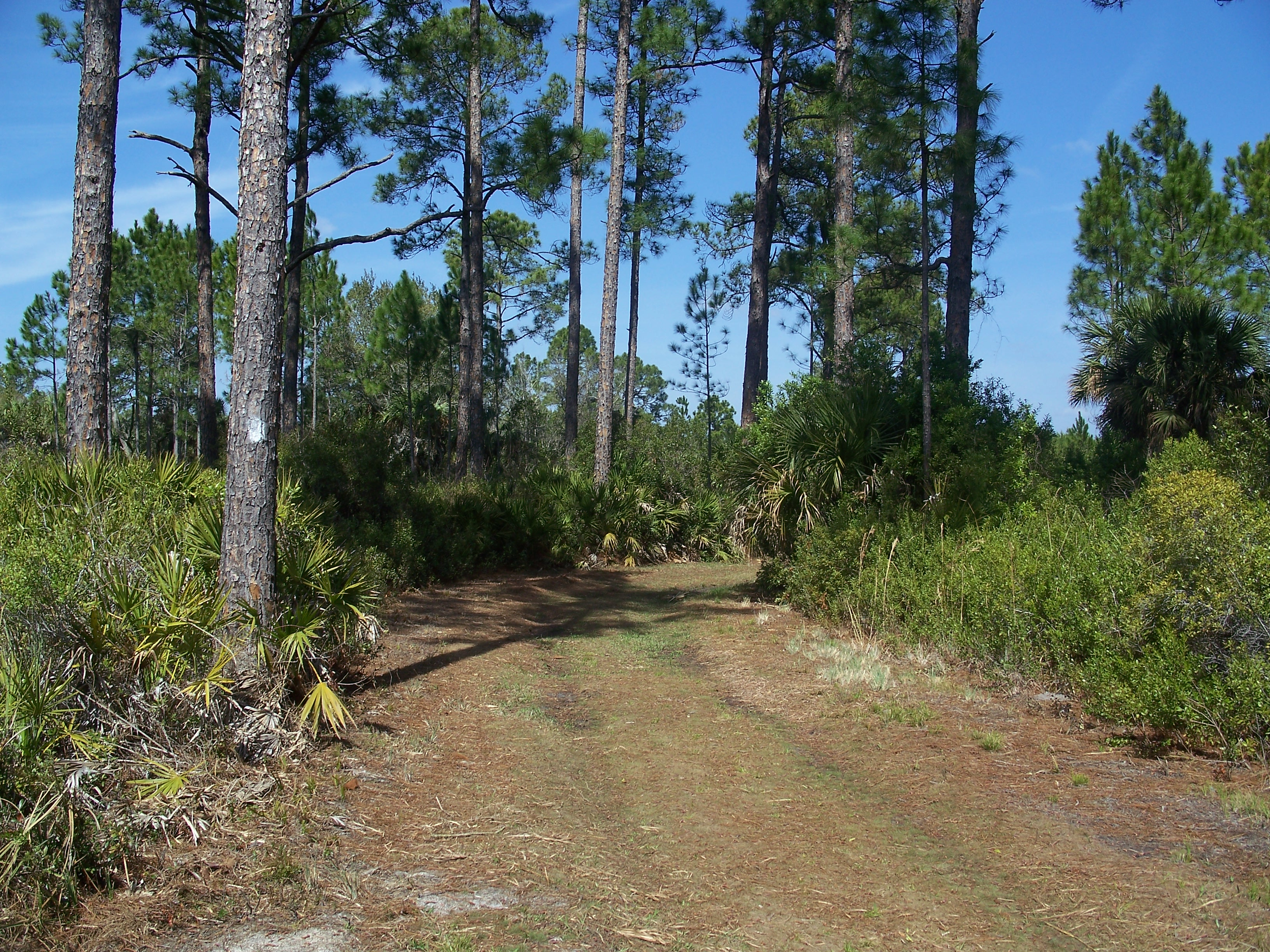
Trail through woods

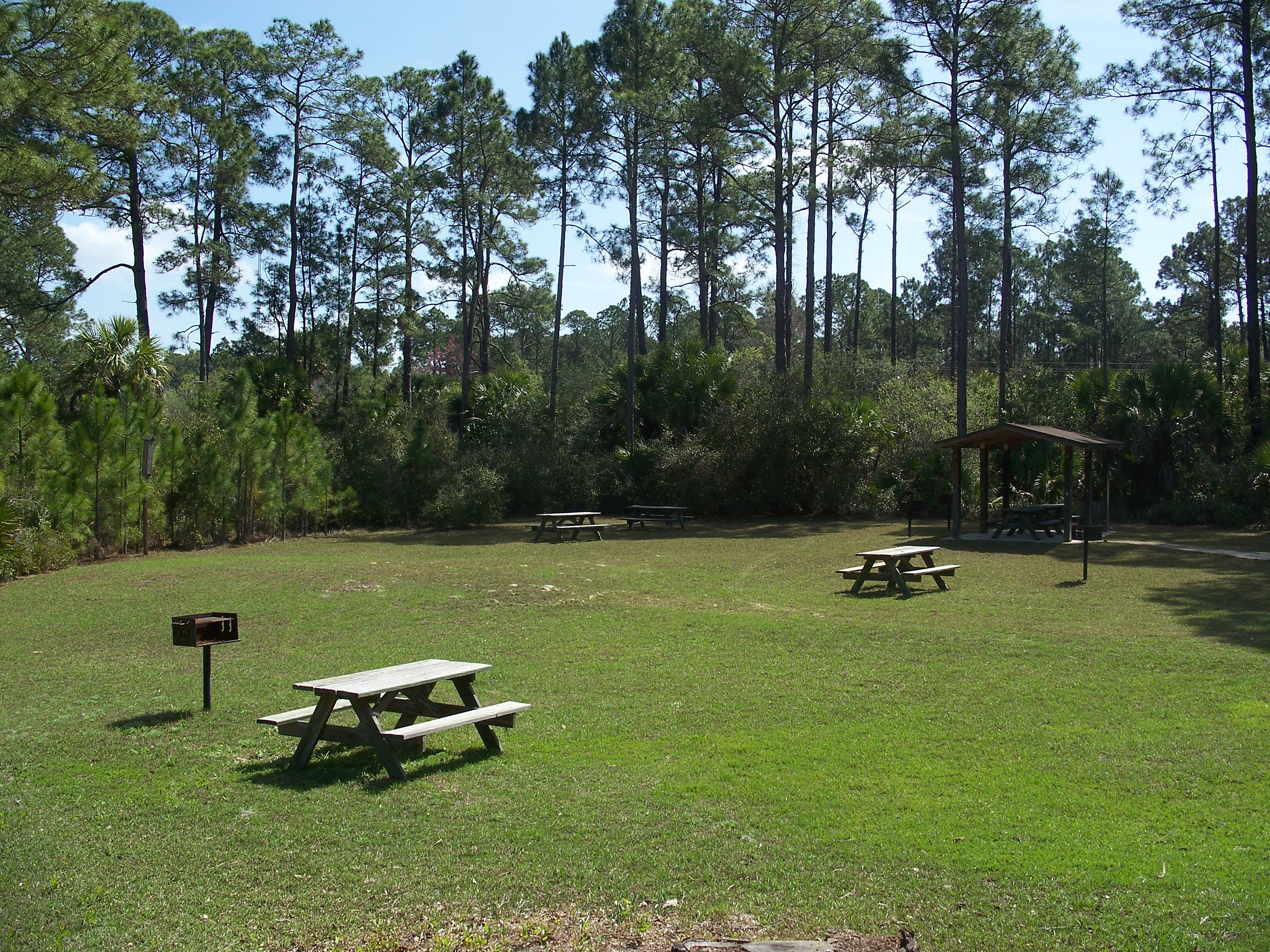
Trailhead
