= Gulf Hammock (wetlands) =

Wetlands area in Florida

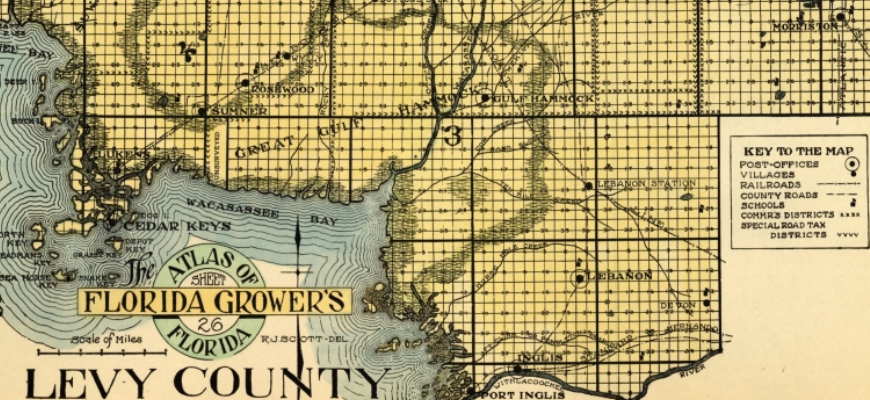
Detail of 1914 map of Levy County, Florida showing the Great Gulf Hammock.

Gulf Hammock is a wetlands area in the southern end of Levy County, Florida. It extends along the Gulf of Mexico coast from Cedar Key to the Withlacoochee River, and reaches several miles inland. Gulf Hammock includes the largest expanse of hydric hammock in Florida. The area is mostly uninhabited, with the area closest to the Gulf coast in a state park, and the inland areas primarily used for logging and hunting.

== Area ==
Gulf Hammock lies along the Gulf of Mexico coast between Cedar Key and the Withlacoochee River, including inland areas southwest of U.S. Highway 19-98 and south of Florida State Road 24. It is part of a series of hammocks, known as the Gulf Hammock Belt, or Gulf Coast Hammocks, found along the Big Bend Coast of Florida from St, Marks, in Wakulla County, to Aripeka, at the boundary between Hernando and Pasco counties.

Gulf Hammock historically covered more than 40,000 hectares (100,000 acres) in Levy County, but has been considerably reduced in size due to conversion to farmland and pine plantations. The Waccasassa Bay Preserve State Park consists of 34,000 acres (14,000 ha) along the coast between Cedar Key and the Withlacoochee River, including 19,000 acres (7,700 ha) of tidal marshes. The Gulf Hammock Wildlife Management Area consists of more than 24,000 acres (9,700 ha) owned by private timber companies. Much of the rest of Gulf Hammock is also held by timber companies.

Gulf Hammock is generally flat and low lying, rising to no more than 25 feet (7.6 m) above sea level, except for some relict sand dunes that occur inland from Cedar Key. It sits on a geological formation where limestone lies very near or at the surface, and the water table is also very near the surface. The portion of the hammock that is in the Waccasassa Bay Preserve State Park is generally less than 5 feet (1.5 m) above sea level, with some islands and mounds rising up to 10 feet (3.0 m) above sea level. The land surface has a thin layer of topsoil over limestone and dolomite. Gulf Hammock is drained by more than 40 named streams. The Waccasassa River flows through the middle of the hammock. The Wekiva River (also known as Wekiva Creek) is a tributary of the Waccasassa River, passing through the community of Gulf Hammock. Other tributaries of the Waccasassa River include Otter Creek, which passes near the town of Otter Creek, and Cow Creek. Dry Creek is the largest stream that flows directly into the Gulf of Mexico. The hammock is also drained by sloughs. During the rainy season, from June through September, the soils are often saturated and the sloughs are flooded. After heavy rainfall events, such as hurricanes, much of the Hammock may be inundated. During the driest months, November, April and May, streams and sloughs often stop flowing, and the soil in higher areas may dry out completely.

== Geomorphology ==
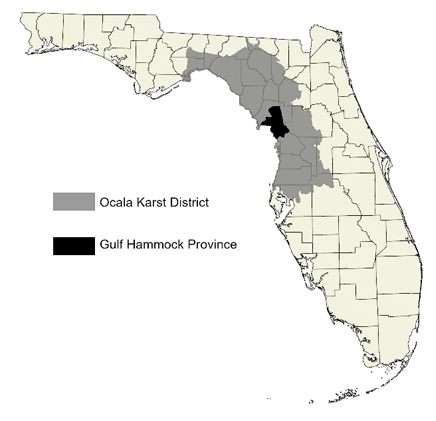
Location of Gulf Hammock geomorphological province in Florida

The Gulf Hammock Province is defined as a geomorphical province in the Ocala Karst District of Florida. It largely overlaps but is not congruent with the historical definition of Gulf Hammock. The province includes central and southern Levy County and small parts of southwestern Marion County and northwestern Citrus county. The Avon Park Formation lies close to the surface. It is generally covered by a thin layer of Quaternary deposits, but is exposed in a few locations. The Avon Park Formation has low permeability, which supports a high water table, creating wetlands throughout the province. While topographic relief is low in the province, shallow circular depressions are scattered throughout the province. The depressions may be sinkholes or other dissolution features. Small relic beach ridges, dunes, and swales with wetlands are found in the eastern part of the province, bordering the Brooksville Ridge Province. Streams in the province are generally swampy. Despite the karst nature of the bedrock, only one stream is known to enter a swallet and go underground.

== Plant communities ==
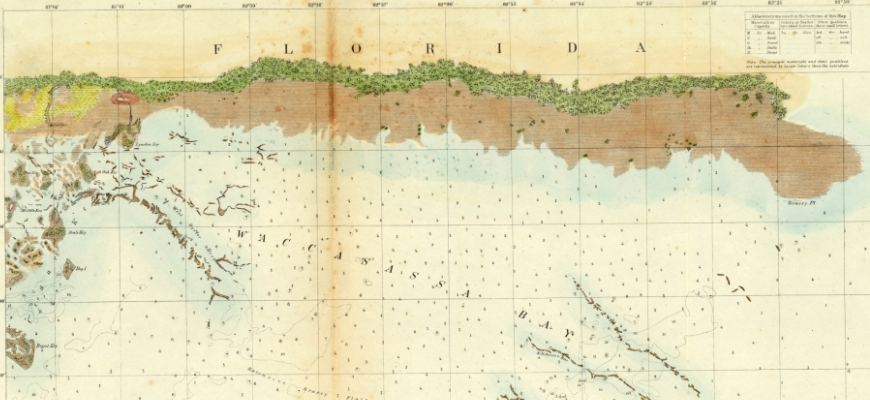
Detail of Waccasassa Bay Nautical Chart 1856 showing the coast between the Cedar Keys and the mouth of the Waccasassa River, with the salt marsh zone in brown and the gulf-facing edge of the coastal hammock zone in green.

Gulf Hammock is separated from the Gulf of Mexico by a salt marsh, which is dominated by black rush. It has tidal creeks and ponds, and is almost completely covered at spring high tides. The salt marsh zone was 1 mile (1.6 km) to 3 miles (4.8 km) wide in 1950. The sea level at Cedar Key has been rising an average of 0.15 centimetres (0.06 in) per year since 1939. As a consequence of the ongoing sea level rise, the salt marsh zone has advanced inland an average of 1 kilometre (0.62 mi) along the coast in Gulf Hammock between 1858 and 1995. Inland from the salt marsh are the coastal hammock and coastal savanna zones. The coastal hammock and savanna communities are on slightly higher ground than the salt marsh zone, but are subject to occasional flooding with salt water. The coastal hammocks are composed primarily of cabbage palms, red cedars and live oaks. The coastal savannas consist of low-growing salt-tolerant plants, with a few cabbage palms.

Inland of the coastal hammocks and savannas are swamps, hydric hammocks and mesic hammocks. The trees in these communities are primarily evergreen hardwoods. Several species of trees are found in all three communities, but differences in abundance of those species and the restriction of some of the species to just one or two of those communities help distinguish them. The swamps are flooded most of the time, while hydric hammocks may be flooded for part of the year, and mesic hammocks are found on relatively dry, slightly elevated areas.

Inland from the swamps and hydric and mesic hammocks are flatwoods. slash pine flatwoods occur on low, poorly-drained land. Long leaf pine flatwoods occur on higher, somewhat better-drained ground. Cypress ponds, small depressions in the flatwoods which retain water almost all of the year, host both bald cypress and pond cypress. Hydric hammocks occur along rivers and streams that flow through the flatwoods, although with a smaller variety of species than are found in the larger hammocks. Sand pine scrub occurs on the relict sand dunes.

== Human activity ==
Gulf Hammock was inhabited by Native Americans before the arrival of Europeans. Thirty-seven archaeological sites from the Weeden Island period, 300 - 1200, were identified in one report. Eighty archaeological sites, primarily shell mounds, have been documented within the boundaries of the Waccasassa Bay Preserve State Park (which includes about one-third of the area of the historic Gulf Hammock). Many of the mounds are eroding. One cause of erosion on mounds has been sea level rise, and many mounds that were formerly on higher ground are now surrounded by water, while other sites used by Native Americans are probably now covered by water. Clarence Bloomfield Moore, an archaeologist active in the last decade of the 19th century and first decade of the 20th century, visited several mounds in Gulf Hammock. The mounds were accessed from Dry Creek and from the Waccasassa River. All of the mounds had been disturbed, sometimes by being plowed, but usually by excavations. Moore reported that one mound had been repeatedly excavated, with the dirt dug out in a second round of excavations dumped in previously excavated trenches, and then dug up again in a third round of excavations on the previously refilled trenches. Moore reported finding burials and artifacts in some of the mounds, but nothing in others. Artifacts recovered at two sites in Gulf Hammock in the 1990s indicate human presence there in the late Paleoindian or early Archaic period.

During the Second Seminole War a grid of forts was established by the U.S. Army in northern Florida to interfere with the movements of the Seminoles. Fort Three was built at the mouth of the Waccasassa River, but no trace of the fort has been found. Local legend indicated that a salt works had operated in Gulf Hammock. Archaeologists found the remains of a small salt works on Salt Island next to Salt Creek in the hammock. Salt Island is a slight rise in the limestone base in the salt marsh, which supports a hydric hammock. The remains consisted of a couple of furnaces and broken pieces of kettles. The remains are probably from the mid- to late-19th century. The site did not appear to be a major producer of salt. The part of Gulf Hammock now in the Waccasassa Bay Preserve State Park is uninhabited.

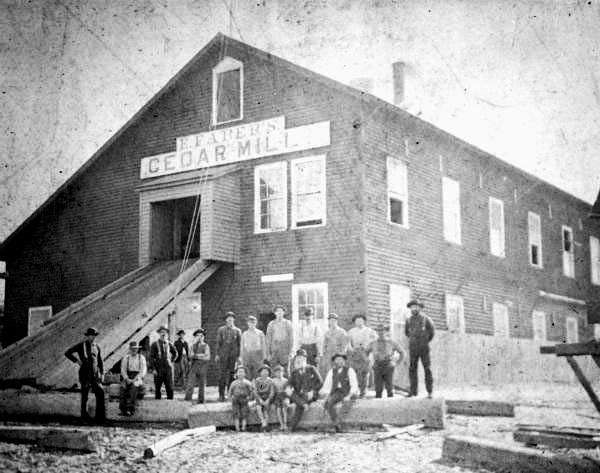
Eberhard Faber's cedar mill in Cedar Key, c. 1890

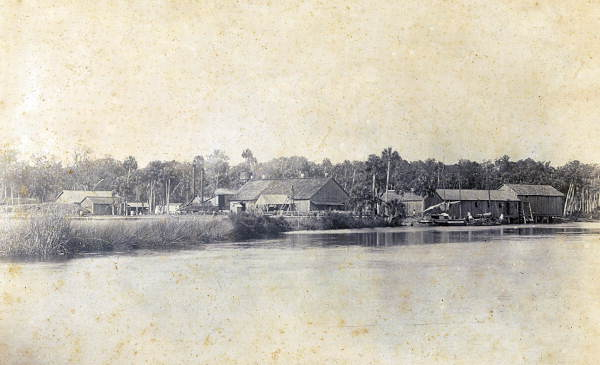
Lumber mill and fiber factory in Gulf Hammock, c. 1890

== Logging ==
Large-scale logging operations began in Gulf Hammock after the American Civil War. In 1865, the Eberhard Faber pencil company built a mill in Cedar Key to cut slats of southern red cedar (Juniperus virginiana), which were sent to New York City to be made into pencils. The Eagle Pencil Company soon built their own mill in Cedar Key for producing cedar slats. Many of the red cedar trees sent to the mills were cut in Gulf Hammock. By the 1890s the red cedars had been over-exploited, and production was falling. In 1896 a hurricane knocked down large numbers of red cedar trees in Gulf Hammock and along the adjacent coastline. The Eagle Pencil Company mill was destroyed, while the Eberhard Faber mill lost 3,000 cases of cedar slats, as well as unprocessed timbers, at a loss of around $40,000. Damage to the Eberhard Faber mill was repaired following the storm, but it closed just two years later due to a shortage of cedar wood. The over-exploitation of red cedar in Gulf Hammock in late 19th century had long-lasting effects. Large stumps were still present a century later, and new growth had not yet reached the girth of those stumps.

Hardwood trees of the hydric hammocks were taken for furniture and crate manufacture in the late 19th and early 20th centuries. New growth had not reached the size of old trees left in the more remote parts of Gulf Hammock by late in the 20th century. Other than for red cedar, logging was selective before the 20th century, taking only the trees with the highest market value at the time. In the first half of the 20th century, highgrading, cutting all trees for which there was a current market, and leaving less desirable trees standing, became popular. In the later half of the 20th century, clearcutting became the standard. These practices changed the composition of the hammocks. Sometimes hammocks were left to regenerate on their own, but many clearcut areas have been planted in loblolly pines.

Cabbage palms had been cut for use as pilings during the 19th century. Later in the 19th century cabbage palms were harvested for fiber. The leaf bud of the palm was cut off, killing the tree. The buds were processed to produce a fiber used in brooms and brushes. The Royal Brush and Broom Company operated a palm fiber factory in the community of Gulf Hammock in the late 19th and early 20th centuries. The Standard Manufacturing Company operated a fiber factory in Cedar Key from 1910 to 1950. Cabbage trees were taken from along the coast from the Suwannee River to the Chassahowitzka River, with Gulf Hammock in the middle of the area.
