= U.S. Route 19 in Florida =

Highway in Florida

U.S. Highway 19
- US 19 highlighted in red

Route information
- Maintained by FDOT
- Length: 261.968 mi (421.597 km)
- Existed: 1929–present

Major junctions
- South end: US 41 in Memphis
- I-275 from Terra Ceia to St. Petersburg US 19 Alt. in St. Petersburg; SR 690 in St. Petersburg; SR 60 in Clearwater; SR 44 in Crystal River; US 27 / US 98 / US 221 in Perry; I-10 near Drifton; US 90 in Monticello
- North end: US 19 / SR 3 / SR 300 south of Thomasville, GA

Location
- Country: United States
- State: Florida
- Counties: Manatee, Hillsborough, Pinellas, Pasco, Hernando, Citrus, Levy, Gilchrist, Dixie, Taylor, Madison, Jefferson

Highway system
- United States Numbered Highway System; List; Special; Divided; Florida State Highway System; Interstate; US; State; Former; Pre‑1945; Toll; Scenic
← SR 18	→ SR 19
← SR 56	SR 57	→ SR 59

U.S. Highway 19 (US 19) runs about 262 miles (422 km) along Florida's west coast from an interchange with US 41 in Memphis, south of Tampa, and continues to the Georgia state line north of Monticello.

As is the case with all Florida roads with federal designations, the entirety of US 19 has a hidden Florida Department of Transportation (FDOT) designation:

- State Road 55 (SR 55) from the U.S. Highway's southern terminus at US 41 south of Terra Ceia to the junction with US 221/SR 55 north in Perry.
- SR 30 from the junction with US 221/SR 55 in Perry for roughly one mile (1.6 km) to the junction with US 27 south (SR 20 east)/US 98 west (SR 30 west) via US 221 Truck.
- SR 20 from the junction with US 27/US 98 in Perry cosigning with US 27 until the routes split in Capps.
- State Road 57 (SR 57) from the US 27/SR 20 split in Capps to the Georgia state line north of Texas Hill.

US 19 remains independent of Interstate 75 (I-75), even as the routes converge in the Tampa Bay area. The route is cosigned with I-275 over the Sunshine Skyway Bridge, a cable-stayed bridge over the mouth of Tampa Bay, US 98 between the Chassahowitzka National Wildlife Refuge and Perry, US 27 Alternate (US 27 Alt.) between Chiefland and Perry, and US 27 between and Perry and Capps.

== Route description ==
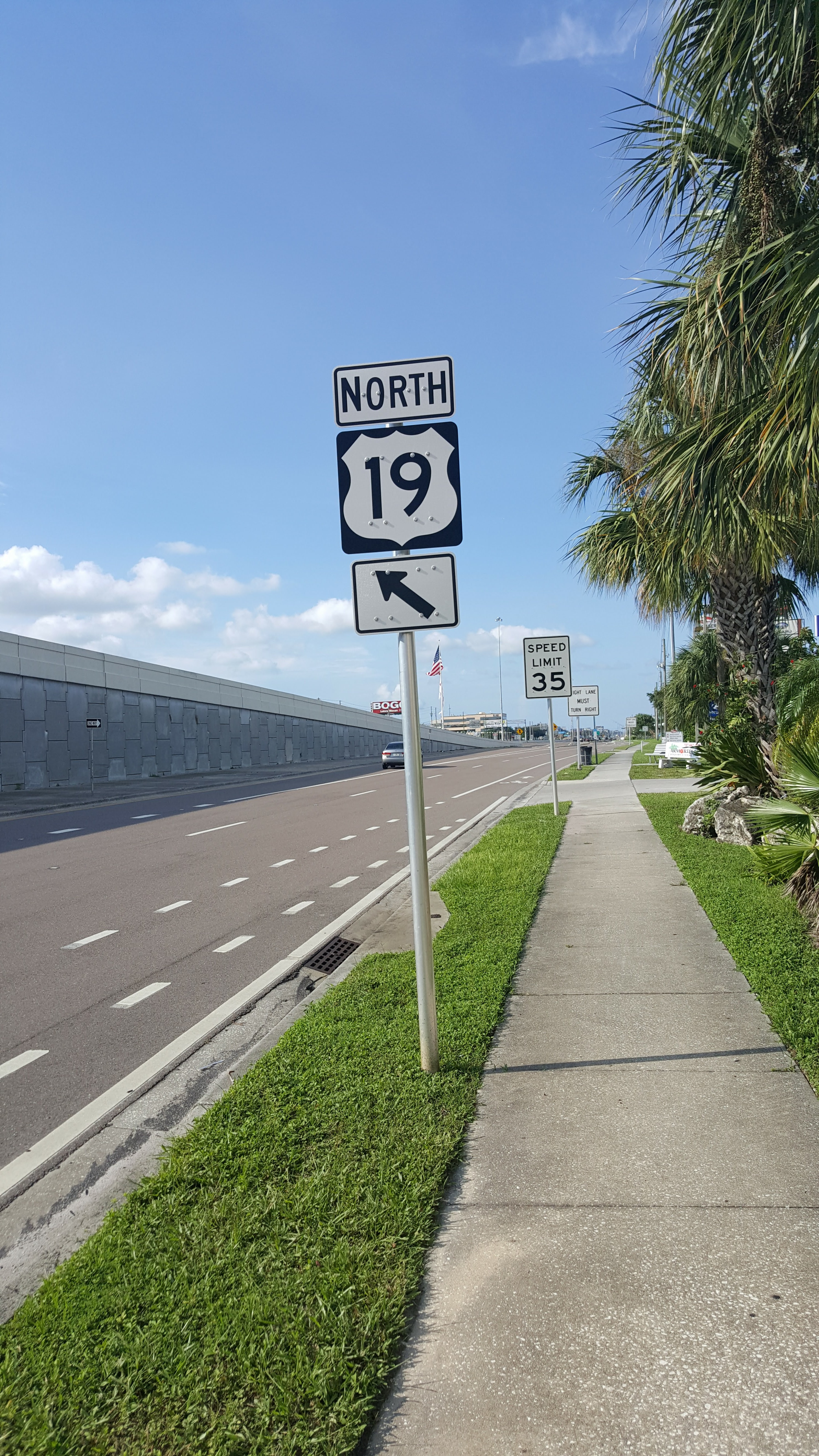
A US 19 sign in Clearwater

=== Manatee County to Pinellas County ===
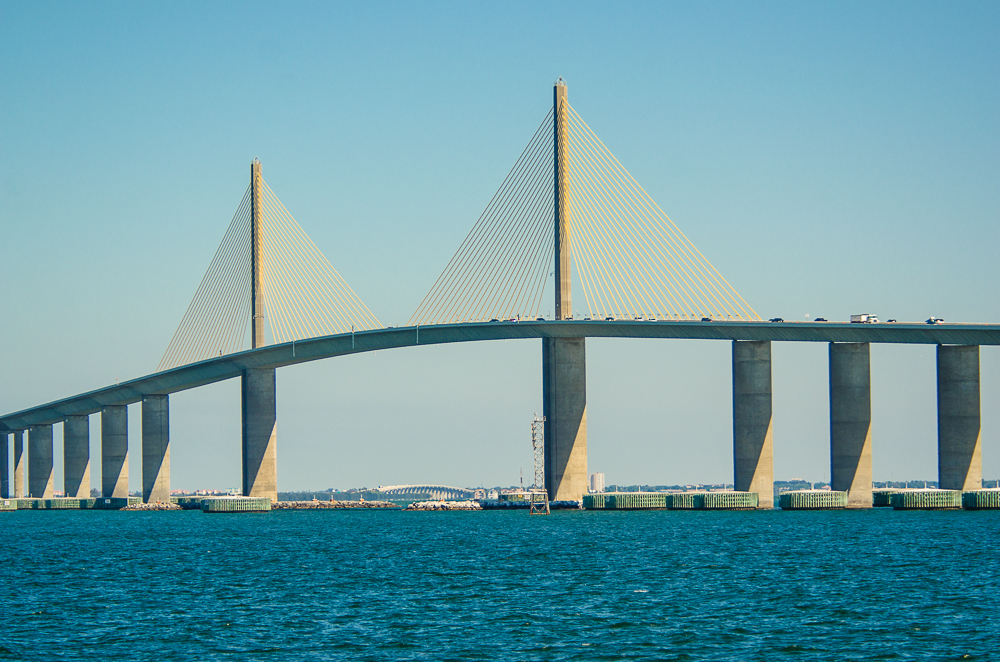
The Sunshine Skyway Bridge, carrying I-275/US 19 across Tampa Bay

The road begins at an interchange with US 41 in Manatee County and remains independent until the interchange with I-275 at exit 5, where it overlaps I-275 across the Sunshine Skyway Bridge, the terminus of which is at the intersection of I-275 and SR 682 at exit 17.

According to a Dateline NBC study, part of US 19 in Florida is the most dangerous road in the U.S. A Florida Highway Patrol test period beginning in 1998 and ending in 2003, as mandated by the National Highway Traffic Safety Administration, showed the stretch of US 19 from Pasco to Pinellas county to average approximately 52 deaths a year, or 262 deaths in the five-year duration of the study. Of these deaths, 100 were pedestrian related making US 19 the #1 worst road to walk on in these two counties. Multiple efforts to improve US 19 have been suggested to FDOT.

Within downtown St. Petersburg, US 19 crosses US 19 Alt., which used to serve as the southern terminus of US 19 Alt. until 2006. US 19 runs along 34th Street until just south of the interchange at SR 694 at Gandy and Park boulevards in Pinellas Park. This interchange was intended for the formerly proposed Gandy Freeway. In eastern Largo, SR 688 shares an interchange with the northern terminus of SR 693, a road that leads to St. Pete Beach and was once part of SR A19A. Immediately after this, the next interchange is at SR 686, the road to St. Pete–Clearwater International Airport. SR 60 is the site of the world's first Single-point urban interchange. Drew Street is north of the interchange, and for years has been a source of major accidents. By 2006, the freeway gap was filled between SR 60 and Sunset Point Road; however, the service roads terminate at a creek between Drew Street and Northeast Coachman Road, creating a traffic situation similar to that of the Oakdale Merge on Long Island, New York.

As of 2017, US 19 is built to freeway standards from just south of 49th Street North to just north of SR 580. The freeway has service roads along the length of the route and Texas U-turns at major interchanges.

=== Pasco County ===
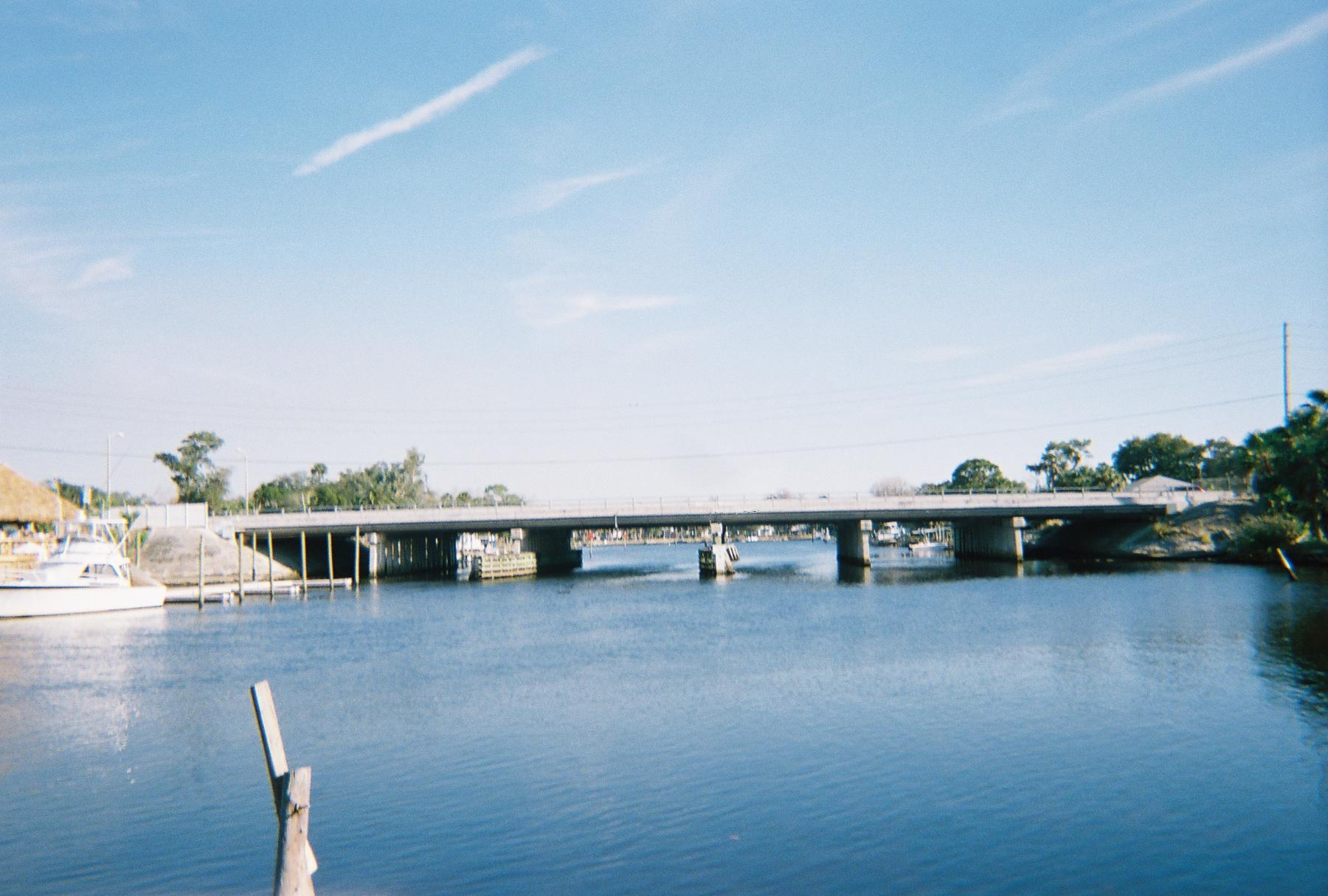
The US 19 bridge over the Pithlachascotee River between New Port Richey and Port Richey

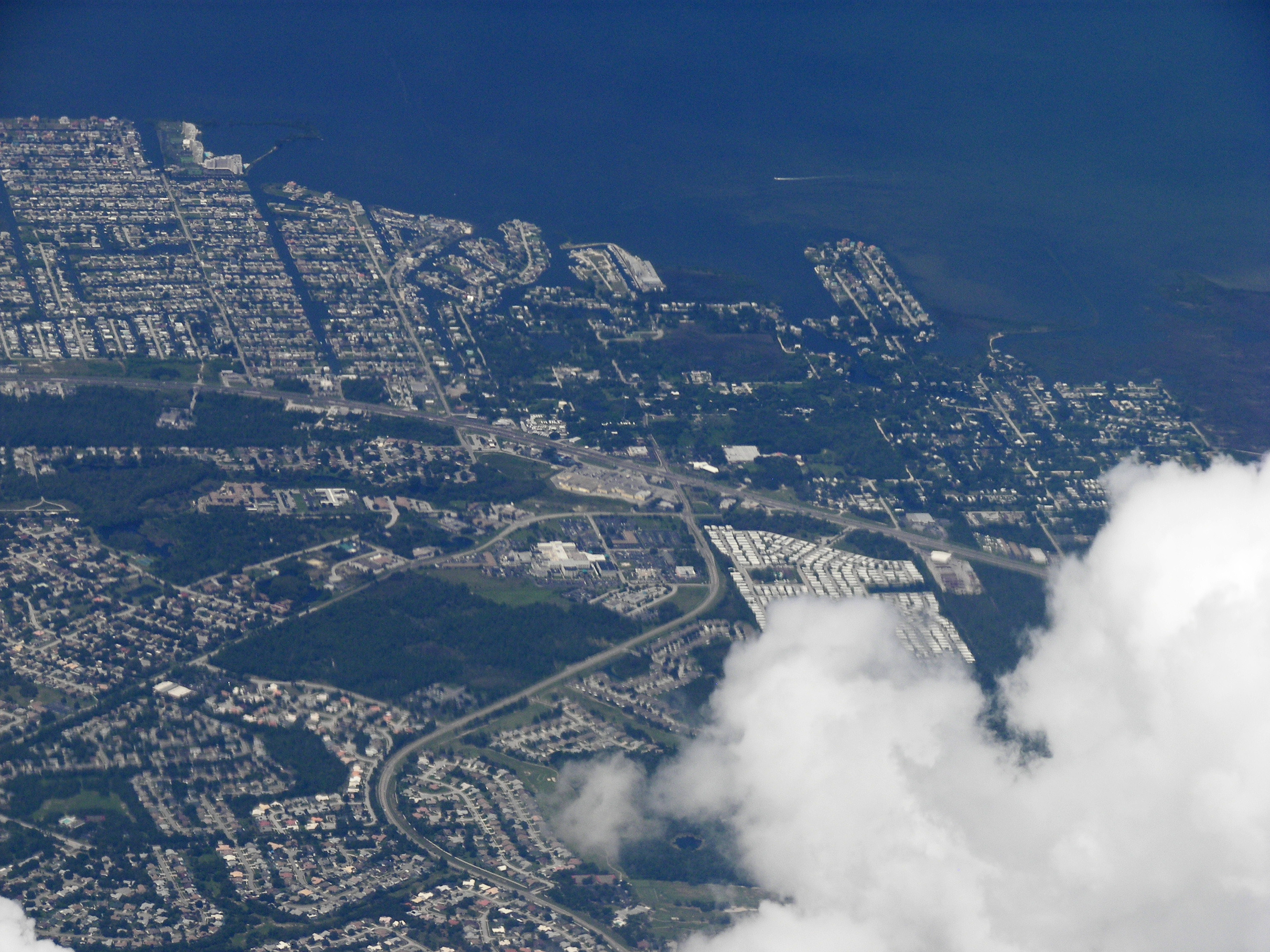
US 19 in Hudson and Hudson Beach

When US 19 Alt. terminates at US 19 in Holiday across from a major trailer park, a de facto extension of the road serves as a brief multiplex with US 19 in Holiday which terminates a block north of the northern terminus of US 19 Alt. in Holiday at Mile Stretch Road (County Road 595, or CR 595). After the intersection with Moog Road, US 19 takes a slight curve to the northeast before intersecting with SR 54. Shortly after this, the road crosses CR 518 (Trouble Creek Road), then dips as it approaches the gateway to Gulf Harbors and curves straight north before reaching Gulf Boulevard. Downtown New Port Richey can be found roughly two miles (3.2 km) north of this point at Main Street which is the northern terminus of unmarked southern CR 595, although the terminus used to be at Grand Boulevard in Port Richey. The bridge over the Pithlachascotee River, which carries US 19 from New Port Richey to Port Richey was a two-lane drawbridge until 1965. An even older version of that bridge is now a fishing pier owned by a boat rental dealership.

Just as in Pinellas County, US 19 in Pasco County has been rated the most dangerous road in the U.S. Ridge Road (CR 524) is considered to be one of the most dangerous intersections of US 19. However instead of making any genuine effort to improve the intersection by building an interchange, local governments have allowed developers to add a Walmart and smaller stores in the vicinity of the intersection. The closest thing to an interchange that has been considered is an overpass strictly for left-turn lanes.

North of Ridge Road, US 19 passes by the Gulf View Square mall as well as the Embassy Plaza and Embassy Crossing shopping centers on the opposite side of the mall. North of these two shopping centers, a marginal dirt road can be found on the east side of US 19 as far north as Fox Hollow Drive, while on the west side a paved road that may have been part of the old US 19 runs from the north end of the mall to Clemens Boulevard. After this, the road intersects CR 77 (Regency Park Drive) south of Jasmine Estates, which is only noticed because an 18-screen movie theater is located opposite from the terminus, before turning straight north again near the intersection with Hammock and Ranch roads. The next major intersection is SR 52 in Bayonet Point. The southwest corner of SR 52 is dominated by a flea market which was originally a racetrack.

After curving from north to northeast near the Old Dixie Highway in Hudson Beach, US 19 intersects with Hudson Avenue and Fivay Drive, the latter of which was formerly part of CR 1. The northern terminus of Little Road (CR 1) was built at the turn of the century further north. Between the former and current terminus of CR 1, US 19 is dotted with independent motels, one of which was plagued with so much flooding during the early 21st Century that it was torn down. Another marginal dirt road exists along the east side of this section. North of Little Road, US 19 curves straight north again.

Aripeka Road (CR 595) is located in one of the most rural sections of the county. Despite efforts to preserve some of the land in this section, a new gated community geared toward horse owners has sprung up north of Aripeka Road. US 19's journey through Pasco County ends at CR 578 (County Line Road) and Holiday Springs RV Resort across from the west end of CR 578.

=== Hernando County ===
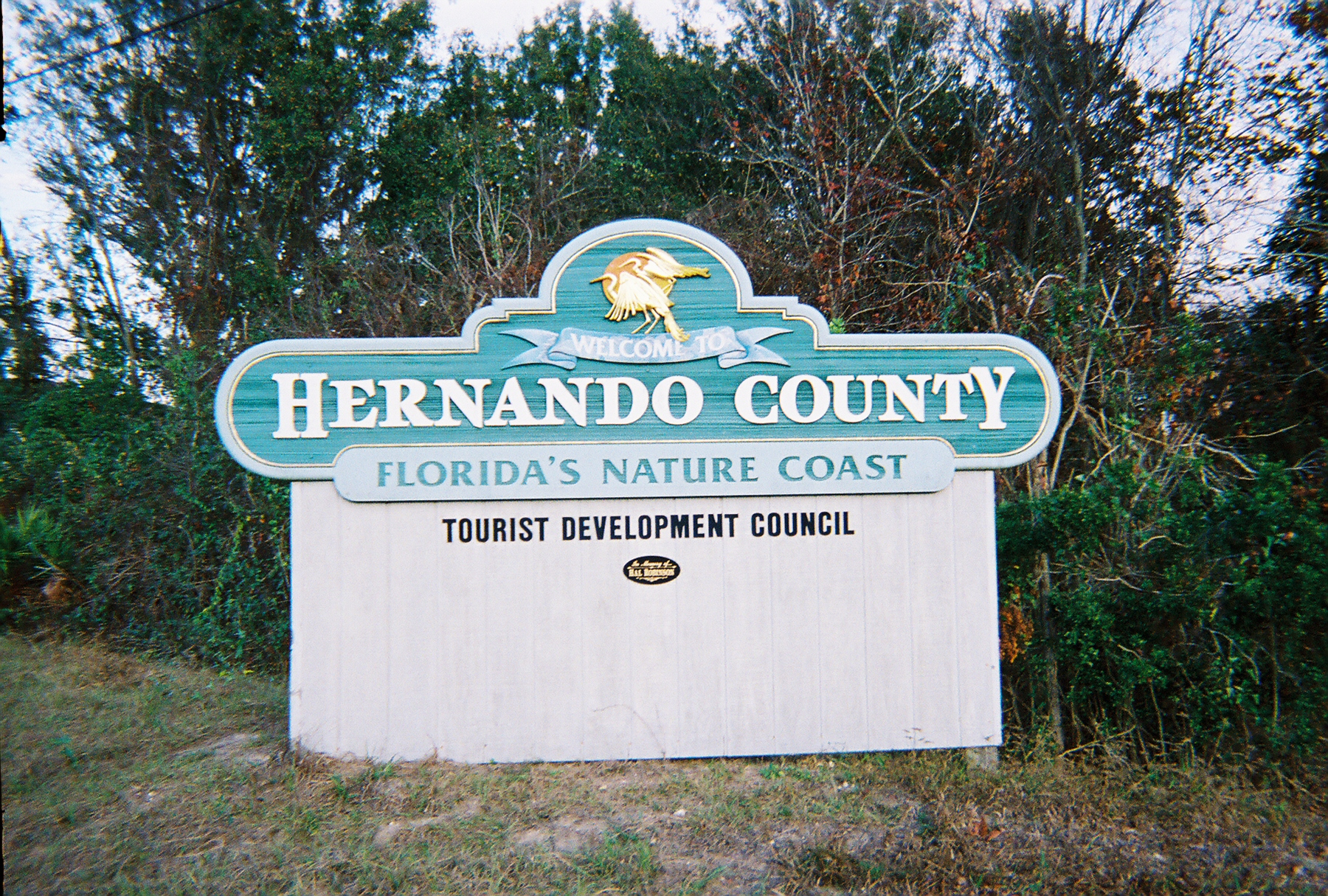
Tourist sign on US 19 just north of County Line Road (CR 578)

After the intersection at CR 578 (County Line Road), US 19 continues northbound as a six-lane highway with occasional frontage roads. Tourist Development Council signs at both borders boast of the county being part of Florida's Nature Coast. The southern half of US 19 serves as most of the western border of Spring Hill. Applegate Road near Wendy Drive is only a short distance from CR 574 (Spring Hill Drive) and CR 595 (Osowaw Boulevard) serve as the Gateways to Spring Hill and Hernando Beach, although southbound US 19 travelers can reach CR 595 from Tarpon Boulevard. Osowaw and Tarpon boulevards were once part of the Old Dixie Highway, which crossed over US 19 and back until shopping centers and a portion of Timber Pines were built along the road.

Evidence of postwar, pre-Disney efforts to attract tourists can be found in two dinosaur-shaped landmarks. The first is north of the Windward Village gated community, and the second is built around a local garage and former Sinclair gas station. In between, there is another short former section of Old Dixie Highway north of Windward Village. Forest Oaks Boulevard is a street that runs past a local Hernando County Sheriff's station as it winds its way to Deltona Boulevard (CR 589). Berkley Manor Boulevard is the next intersection but strictly leads to another Deed Restricted Community in Spring Hill. On the opposite side of these two intersections is a shopping center in front of two other roads leading to gated communities.

US 19 leaves Spring Hill north of Northcliffe Boulevard and enters Weeki Wachee, "the City of Live Mermaids". Weeki Wachee Springs State Park, famous for the daily mermaid performances and the Buccaneer Bay waterpark is at the intersection of SR 50 (Cortez Boulevard). This coastal spur becomes CR 550 and will travel out to Bayport (Bayport Park and boat ramp) and to Pine Island, the county's only Gulf water beach. A shopping center can be found diagonally across from the park. North of SR 50, US 19 is four-lanes wide and has had a limited number of median openings that contain left-turn lanes until 2014. Signs warn motorists that the region is a bear habitat. This is because much of what surrounds US 19 north of Hexam Road consists of the Chassahowitzka National Wildlife Refuge. Even the intersection with CR 476 (Centralia Road) is barely notable without signs.

=== Citrus County ===
Across the Hernando–Citrus county line, US 19 continues its rural surroundings, but this time has a limited number of left-turn lanes in the center median. Recent development in the area may lead to the addition of such turn lanes. US 98 joins US 19 in Chassahowitzka National Wildlife Refuge, where SR 700 ends. CR 480 also shares this intersection and overlaps US 98 before branching out on its own toward Floral City. The first developed neighborhood encountered along US 19/US 98 is Sugarmill Woods. After the western terminus of Cardinal Lane, the road passes by Howard's Flea Market then curves to the northwest. Within Homosassa Springs, the routes overlap CR 490 after the eastern terminus of West Yulee Drive. CR 490A terminates at the three-route concurrency with US 19/US 98/CR 490. Less than 0.5 miles (0.80 km) north of end of the CR 490 concurrency at West Homosassa Trail, the divider begins to widen again. North of Homosassa Springs, US 19/US 98 serves as the location of a series of car dealerships, local garages, a Moose Lodge, churches, and the intersection of Ozello Trail (CR 494).

As the road approaches Crystal River Airport, it enters the city of Crystal River, since the airport serves as the unofficial southern border. At the intersection of CR 44W, US 19/US 98 becomes a six-lane divided boulevard. The division of this highway ends again, just south of the intersection of SR 44, where the road curves west as it approaches CR 495 (North Citrus Avenue). US 19/US 98 curves back north and becomes a divided highway once again as it approaches the site of the former Crystal River Mall. Other former sections exist between Crystal River and Red Level, while the current US 19/US 98 passes by sparsely located hotels, bars, houses, cluster developments, and signs advertising locally-prepared peanuts. It also passes by the Seven Rivers Regional Medical Center just south of the Crystal River Nuclear Plant and then CR 488 in Red Level. A field where American Civil War reenactments are staged lies just north of the back entrance to a local quarry.

The Marjorie Harris Carr Cross Florida Greenway was the last section of US 19 that was two lanes wide in Citrus County. A new four-lane divided bridge was completed by FDOT in the early-2010s, which was originally planned in conjunction with the proposed Suncoast Parkway extension to Red Level. A smaller four-lane bridge carries US 19/US 98 across the Withlacoochee River as it crosses the Citrus–Levy county line.

=== Levy County to Dixie County ===
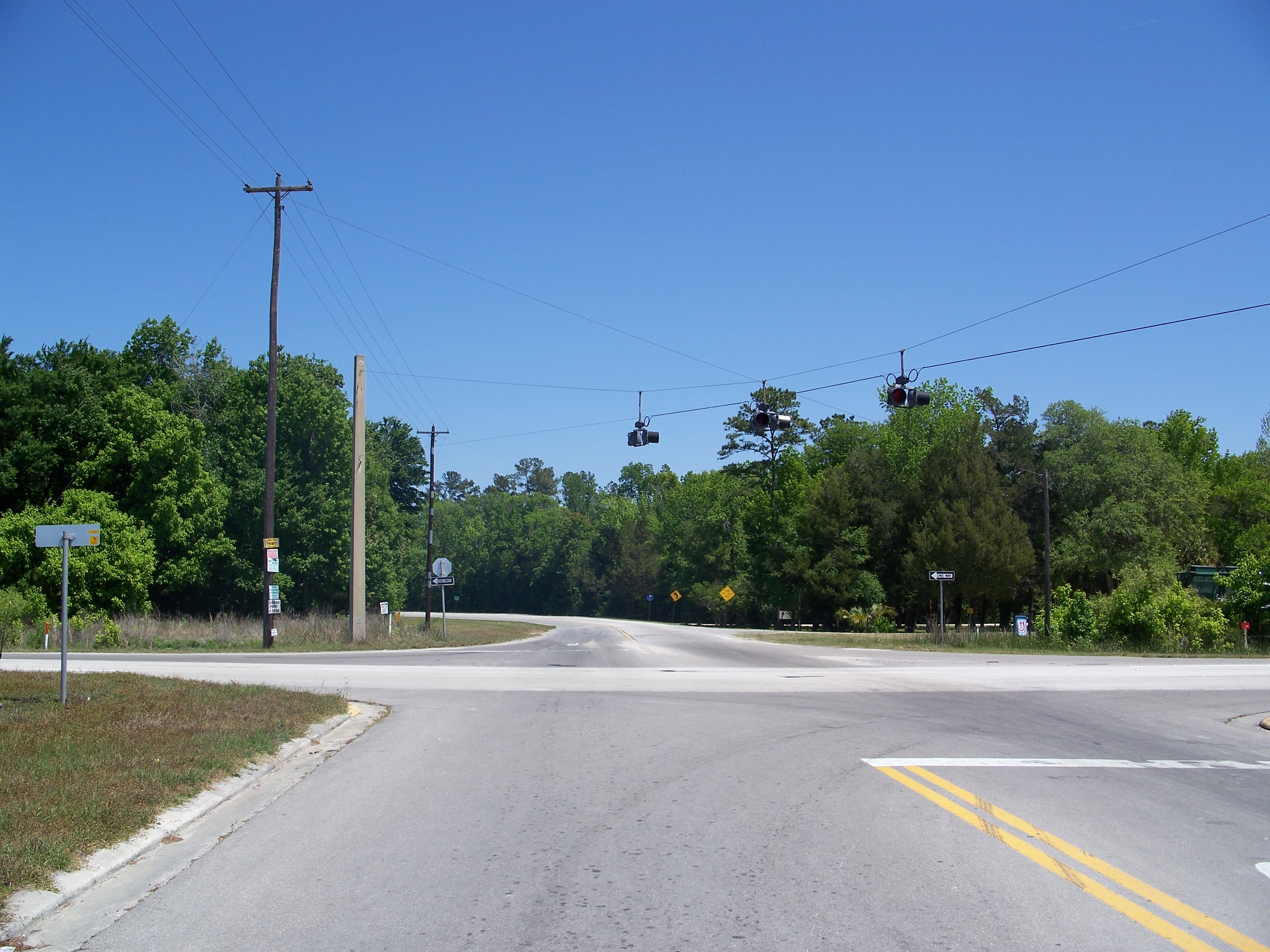
Intersection of US 19 and CR 326, looking east along CR 326

US 19/US 98 crosses the Withlacoochee River and immediately enters Levy County and the city of Inglis, where it intersects with CR 40. West of US 19/US 98, CR 40 is named "Follow That Dream Boulevard" for the 1962 movie starring Elvis Presley. Shortly after this, the road intersects CR 40A. North of Inglis, US 19/US 98 runs along sparse residences, trailer parks, a Florida Sheriff's Youth Facility, the Gulf Hammock Wildlife Management Area and eventually the Goethe State Forest. Within the forest, the road crosses the Ten Mile Creek bridge before reaching an at-grade interchange with SR 121 and CR 336 in Lebanon Junction. From there, US 19/US 98 runs along an abandoned railroad line along the east side, while the median is widened and lined with the trees that existed before the road was ever built. This section also secretly overlaps CR 336. At the intersection of CR 326 in Gulf Hammock, an old locomotive and caboose are on display. Blinking signals exist over the intersection with SR 24 in Otter Creek, but the overlap with CR 336 leaves just before the signal.

US 27 Alt. joins US 19/US 98 in Chiefland where SR 500 ends. This intersection was transformed into a 90-degree intersection, which directly faces a local high school. Almost instantly, US 19/US 27 Alt./US 98 encounters the intersection of US 129.

US 19/US 27 Alt./US 98 makes a sharp left turn near the intersection of SR 26 in Fanning Springs, where it also crosses the Joe H. Anderson Sr. Bridge over the Suwannee River, thus entering Dixie County. It then follows the left bank of the Suwannee River and intersects the eastern terminus of CR 55A, and even contains a truck weight station in the median before reaching SR 349 in Old Town, which used to be US 129 Alt. The road starts making more of a northwest turn after this and shortly afterward encounters CR 351 in Cross City, then passes through Shamrock where the road crosses CR 358 twice. After the second crossing of CR 358, it begins to take an even more northerly direction before leaving Dixie County at the Steinhatchee River.

=== Taylor County to Jefferson County ===
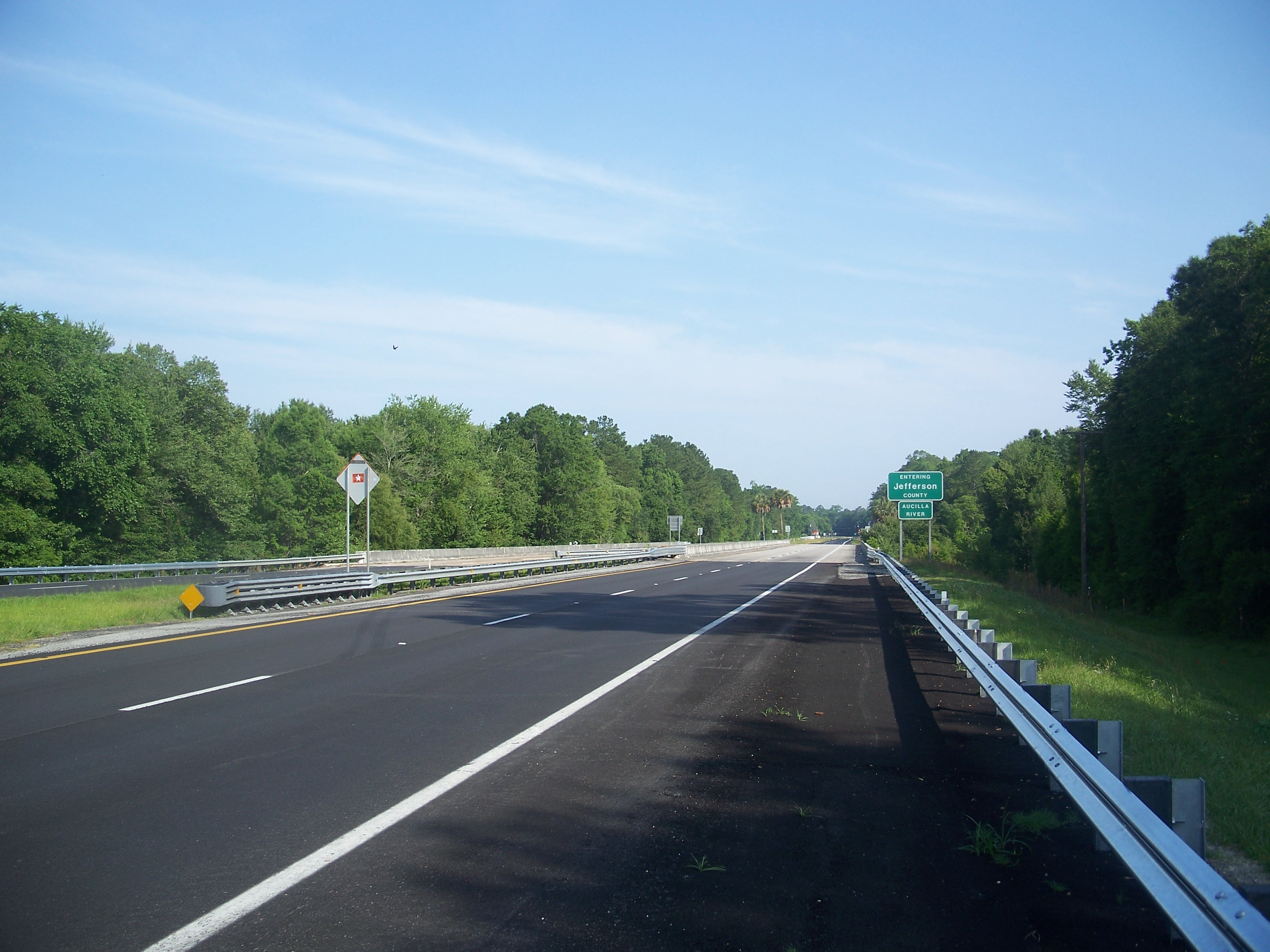
US 19/US 27 crossing the Aucilla River, south of Lamont

Immediately after crossing the Steinhatchee River, US 19 enters Taylor County, where it intersects with SR 51 at Tennille. The rest of the way, US 19 passes through small unincorporated areas such as Salem, Carbur, Athena, and Pinland.

In Bucell Junction, US 19 gains the name Byron Butler Parkway as it intersects with SR 30 and SR 30A near Perry–Foley Airport. SR 30 secretly joins US 19 momentarily. Within the city limits of Perry, SR 55 veers to the right along US 221. SR 30 is the secret designation north of here. US 27 Alt. terminates at US 27, which replaces it as an overlapping U.S. Highway as US 98 heads west along SR 30. From this point, the secret designation is SR 20. It also briefly carries US 221 Truck until it reaches CR 359A (Wright Road).

In Eridu, the road intersects with CR 14. US 19/US 27 briefly enters Madison County where the name is changed to the Florida–Georgia Parkway, where it intersects with CR 150, then Jefferson County. The first major town in Jefferson County that the road enters is Lamont, where US 19/US 27 encounters former SR 165, CR 257A, and CR 257B, as it begins to move in a more westerly direction.

=== Capps to the Georgia State Line ===
State Road 57
- Location: Capps–Georgia state line, near Thomasville

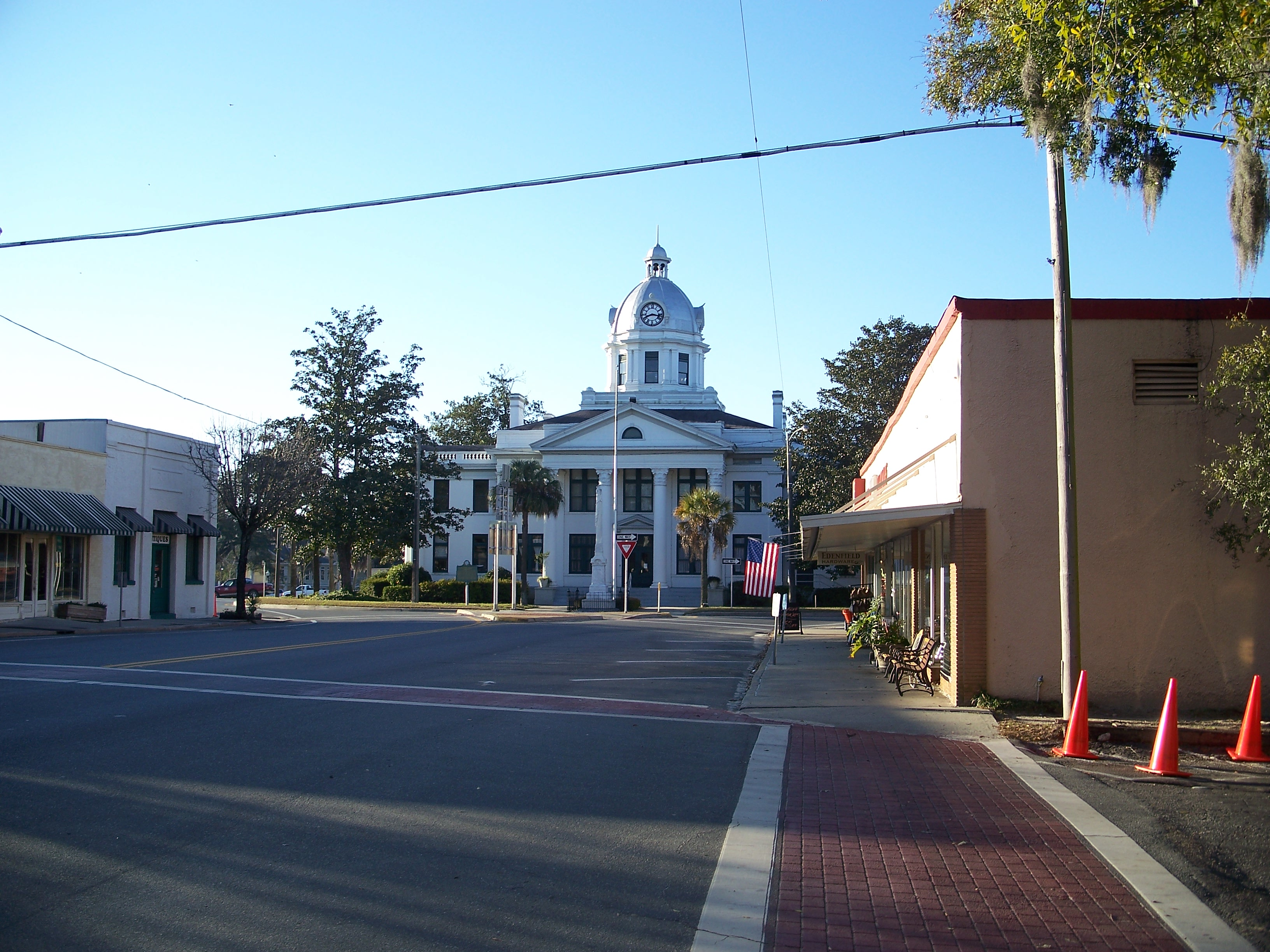
Intersection of US 19 and US 90 in Monticello

US 27 leaves US 19 in Capps along with SR 20, on its way through Tallahassee. From this point on, SR 57 is the secret designation, and the road maintains the name Florida–Georgia Parkway. After the intersection with CR 158B, US 19 encounters I-10 at exit 225 in Drifton, then an intersection with CR 57A, and later CR 158. The road shares a concurrency with CR 259 as it intersects US 90 (SR 10) and CR 146, but it ends just south of the intersection with CR 149 in Monticello. US 19 finally crosses the Georgia state line where SR 57 ends and State Route 3 (SR 3) and SR 300 begin, the former of which is the state route for US 19 into Atlanta, while the latter of which is the state route for US 19 from there to Albany, Georgia.

== History ==
Historical US 19 route markers

1929 design

1948 design

1956–1993, red highway shields

US 19 first entered Florida in 1929. It underwent three route shifts (the first in 1933, the second in 1946, and the third in 1951), which adjusted it to its current alignment and created the alternate route in Pinellas County. US 19 was extended to its southern terminus of Memphis in September 1954, when the original Sunshine Skyway Bridge opened to traffic.

From 1956 until 1993, US 19 signs in Florida featured white numbering on a red shield. The "color-coding" of U.S. Highways by FDOT was stopped when the state could no longer use federal funds to replace the signs with anything but the standard black-and-white version; a few red US 19 signs remain.

== Major intersections ==
County	Location	mi	km	Destinations	Notes
Manatee		0.000	0.000	US 41 (SR 45 / SR 55 south) – Palmetto, Bradenton	interchange; southern terminus of US 19
Manatee		0.651	1.048	50th Street West - Bay Colony, Palmetto Point	
Manatee	Terra Ceia	1.725	2.776	Bayshore Drive - Madira Bickel Mound State Archaeological Site	
Manatee	Terra Ceia	3.099	4.987	I-275 south (SR 93) to I-75	south end of I-275 / SR 93 overlap; southbound exit and northbound entrance; US 19 uses I-275 exit 5
Manatee	Terra Ceia			South Toll Plaza (northbound only); SunPass or Toll-by-Plate	
Manatee		4.72	7.60	South Skyway Fishing Pier; Rest Area	
Hillsborough		7	11	Sunshine Skyway Bridge over Tampa Bay	
Pinellas	St. Petersburg	10.23	16.46	North Skyway Fishing Pier; Rest Area	
Pinellas	St. Petersburg			North Toll Plaza (southbound only); SunPass or Toll-by-Plate	
Pinellas	St. Petersburg	14.30	23.01	Skyway Lane, Pinellas Point Drive	northbound exit and southbound entrance; I-275 exit 16
Pinellas	St. Petersburg	14.772	23.773	I-275 north (SR 93) – Tampa	north end of I-275 / SR 93 overlap; northbound exit and southbound entrance; US 19 uses I-275 exit 17
Pinellas	St. Petersburg	15.023	24.177	SR 682 west (54th Avenue South / Pinellas Bayway) to I-275 north – Fort Desoto Park, St. Pete Beach, Eckerd College	
Pinellas	St. Petersburg	16.784	27.011	To I-275 south / 26th Avenue South	
Pinellas	St. Petersburg	17.035	27.415	CR 138 west (22nd Avenue South) to I-275 north – Stetson University College of Law	
Pinellas	St. Petersburg	18.595	29.926	CR 150 (Central Avenue)	
Pinellas	St. Petersburg	19.030	30.626	US 19 Alt. / SR 595 (5th Avenue North) to I-275 north – Seminole, Largo	
Pinellas	St. Petersburg	20.032	32.238	CR 690 (22nd Avenue North) to I-275	
Pinellas	St. Petersburg	21.039	33.859	CR 184 (38th Avenue North) to I-275 – VA Medical Center	
Pinellas	Lealman	22.053	35.491	CR 202 (54th Avenue North) to I-275	
Pinellas	Pinellas Park	22.556	36.300	CR 216 (62nd Avenue North)	
Pinellas	Pinellas Park	22.999	37.013	Haines Road (CR 691 south)	northbound access only
Pinellas	Pinellas Park	23.386	37.636	SR 694 (Park Boulevard / Gandy Boulevard) to I-275 – Tampa, Pinellas Park, Seminole	interchange
Pinellas	Pinellas Park	25.272	40.671	CR 611 (49th Street North) – Pinellas Park	south end of freeway
Pinellas	Pinellas Park	26.048	41.920	CR 298 (110th Avenue North)	northbound exit is combined with CR 296
Pinellas	Pinellas Park	26.611	42.826	CR 296 (Bryan Dairy Road / 118th Avenue North / Gateway Expressway) / SR 690 east to I-275 / Frontage Road	southbound exit for CR 296 is combined with SR 688; southbound exit and northbound entrance for SR 690
Pinellas	Pinellas Park	27.207	43.785	CR 346 west (126th Avenue North)	northbound exit is combined with CR 296; southbound exit is combined with SR 688
Pinellas		27.812	44.759	SR 688 (Ulmerton Road) to I-275 – Tampa	
Pinellas	Largo	28.558	45.960	SR 693 south (66th Street North) – St. Pete Beach	no northbound exit
Pinellas	Largo	28.9	46.5	Frontage Road to 150th Avenue North	no access across US 19; southbound exit is combined with SR 686
Pinellas	Largo	29.457	47.406	SR 686 (East Bay Drive / Roosevelt Boulevard) – Largo	
Pinellas	Largo	29.967	48.227	Frontage Road, Whitney Road (CR 438 east)	northbound exit is combined with SR 686
Pinellas	Largo–Clearwater line	30.959	49.824	Nursery Road (CR 474 west), Belleair Road (CR 464 west)	
Pinellas	Clearwater	32.132	51.711	Harn Boulevard, Seville Boulevard	No access across US 19; northbound exit is combined with SR 60
Pinellas	Clearwater	32.483	52.276	SR 60 (Gulf To Bay Boulevard) – Tampa, Downtown Clearwater, Clearwater Beaches	
Pinellas	Clearwater	32.996	53.102	Drew Street (CR 528 west)	southbound exit is combined with SR 60
Pinellas	Clearwater	34.013	54.739	SR 590 (Northeast Coachman Road) – Safety Harbor	
Pinellas	Clearwater	34.560	55.619	Sunset Point Road (CR 576)	southbound exit is combined with SR 590
Pinellas	Clearwater	35.6	57.3	Dimmitt Drive, Frontage Road	no access across US 19
Pinellas	Clearwater	35.904	57.782	CR 638 east (Enterprise Road)	No access across US 19; southbound exit is combined with SR 580
Pinellas	Clearwater	36.352	58.503	Countryside Boulevard	southbound exit is combined with SR 580
Pinellas	Clearwater	36.707	59.074	SR 580 – Dunedin, Oldsmar	
Pinellas	Dunedin	36.9	59.4	Evans Road	north end of freeway; no access across US 19; northbound exit is combined with SR 580
Pinellas	Dunedin	38.736	62.340	SR 586 (Curlew Road) – Dunedin Beach, Oldsmar, Honeymoon Island State Park	interchange proposed
Pinellas	Palm Harbor	39.988	64.354	CR 752 (Tampa Road)	
Pinellas	Palm Harbor	40.797	65.656	CR 776 west (Nebraska Avenue)	
Pinellas	Palm Harbor	41.811	67.288	CR 816 west (Alderman Road)	
Pinellas	Tarpon Springs	43.836	70.547	Klosterman Road (CR 880 west) - St. Petersburg College, Leepa-Rattner Museum of Art	
Pinellas	Tarpon Springs	45.431	73.114	CR 582 (Tarpon Avenue) to SR 589 (Suncoast Parkway) – Downtown	
Pinellas	Tarpon Springs	46.849	75.396	Beckett Way (CR 976 west)	
Pasco	Holiday	47.938	77.149	US 19 Alt. south (SR 595) – Tarpon Springs, Sponge Docks	
Pasco	Holiday	48.311	77.749	CR 595 north (Mile Stretch Drive)	
Pasco	Elfers	50.330	80.998	SR 54 east to SR 589 (Suncoast Parkway) – Zephyrhills	
Pasco	New Port Richey	50.889	81.898	CR 518 east (Troublecreek Road)	
Pasco	New Port Richey	52.737	84.872	Main Street - Downtown New Port Richey	
Pasco	Port Richey	54.443	87.618	Grand Boulevard (CR 595 south)	
Pasco	Port Richey	55.012	88.533	CR 524 east (Ridge Road) – Pasco–Hernando State College	
Pasco		57.024	91.771	CR 77 south (Regency Park Boulevard)	
Pasco	Bayonet Point	58.776	94.591	SR 52 east to SR 589 (Suncoast Parkway) – San Antonio, Dade City	
Pasco		64.298	103.478	CR 1 south (Little Road)	
Pasco		65.613	105.594	CR 595 north (Aripeka Road) – Aripeka	
Pasco–Hernando county line	Spring Hill	66.990	107.810	CR 578 east (County Line Road)	
Hernando	Spring Hill	68.916	110.910	CR 574 east (Spring Hill Drive) / CR 595 west (Osowaw Boulevard) to SR 589 (Suncoast Parkway) – Hernando Beach, Aripeka	
Hernando	Spring Hill	73.435	118.182	Northcliffe Boulevard (CR 587 south)	
Hernando	Weeki Wachee	74.249	119.492	SR 50 east / CR 550 west (Cortez Boulevard) to SR 589 (Suncoast Parkway) – Bayport, Hernando Beach, Brooksville, Orlando	
Hernando		80.965	130.301	CR 476 east (Centralia Road)	
Citrus		88.418	142.295	US 98 south (Ponce de Leon Boulevard) / CR 480 west (Miss Maggie Drive) to SR 589 (Suncoast Parkway) – Chassahowitzka, Brooksville	south end of US 98 overlap
Citrus				CR 482 east (West Cardinal Street) – Mannsfield	
Citrus	Homosassa Springs	94.172	151.555	CR 490 west (West Yulee Drive) – Homosassa, Yulee Sugar Mill Ruins Historic State Park	
Citrus	Homosassa Springs	94.559	152.178	CR 490A west (Halls River Road) / Grover Cleveland Boulevard	
Citrus	Homosassa Springs	94.686	152.382	CR 490 east (Homosassa Trail) – Lecanto	
Citrus		98.172	157.993	CR 494 west (West Ozello Trail) – Ozello	
Citrus	Crystal River	100.017	160.962	CR 44W west (Fort Island Trail) – Fort Island Gulf Beach, Crystal River National Wildlife Refuge	
Citrus	Crystal River	101.152	162.788	SR 44 east (Northeast 5th Street) to I-75 – Inverness	
Citrus	Crystal River	101.594	163.500	CR 495 north (Citrus Avenue)	
Citrus	Red Level	107.246	172.596	CR 488 east (West Dunnellon Road) – Dunnellon	
Citrus	Red Level			Trooper Ronald Gordon Smith Memorial Bridge over the Cross Florida Barge Canal	
Withlacoochee River				Bridges	
Levy	Inglis	111.949	180.164	CR 40 (Follow That Dream Parkway) – Yankeetown, Dunnellon, Withlacoochee Gulf Preserve	
Levy		113.270	182.290	CR 40A west	
Levy	Lebanon Station	121.575	195.656	SR 121 north / CR 336 east – Williston, Dunnellon, Gainesville, Goethe State Forest	
Levy	Gulf Hammock	129.886	209.031	CR 326	
Levy	Otter Creek	135.708	218.401	SR 24 to I-75 – Cedar Key, Bronson, Gainesville	
Levy		142.708	229.666	CR 347 (Northwest 60th Street / Northwest 30th Avenue) – Fowlers Bluff, Lower Suwannee National Wildlife Refuge	
Levy	Chiefland	147.266	237.002	SR 345 (Southeast 4th Avenue / Southwest 4th Avenue) – Cedar Key, Bronson	
Levy	Chiefland	148.043	238.252	US 27 Alt. south (SR 500) – Ocala, Bronson, Williston	south end of US 27 Alt. overlap
Levy	Chiefland	148.158	238.437	US 129 north (Rodgers Boulevard / SR 49) – Trenton, Gainesville, Live Oak	
Levy	Chiefland	148.963	239.733	SR 320 west (Northwest 19th Avenue) – Manatee Springs State Park	
Levy	Chiefland	149.511	240.615	CR 320 east (Northwest 120th Street)	
Levy		149.608	240.771	CR 341 (Northwest 60th Avenue) – Manatee Springs State Park	
Levy		151.770	244.250	CR 346 east (Northwest 140th Street)	
Levy		154.610	248.821	CR 346A east (Northwest 165th Street)	
Levy	Fanning Springs	156.08	251.19	CR 55A north to SR 26 east – Trenton, Newberry, Gainesville, University of Florida	
Gilchrist	Fanning Springs	156.357	251.632	SR 26 east – Trenton, Newberry, Gainesville, University of Florida	
Suwannee River		156.969	252.617	Joe H. Anderson Sr. Bridge	
Dixie		158.441	254.986	CR 317 south	
Dixie		158.945	255.797	CR 55A north (Southeast 136th Avenue)	
Dixie	Old Town	160.347	258.053	SR 349 north / CR 349 south – Suwannee, Branford, Lower Suwannee National Wildlife Refuge	
Dixie	Eugene	166.534	268.010	CR 55A south	
Dixie	Cross City	169.391	272.608	CR 351 north	
Dixie	Cross City	169.513	272.805	CR 351 south	
Dixie	Shamrock	170.496	274.387	CR 351A – Horseshoe Beach, truck route to CR 351	
Dixie		172.864	278.198	CR 358 west	
Dixie	Jonesboro	180.947	291.206	CR 358 east	
Dixie	Jonesboro	181.087	291.431	CR 358 west – Jena, Stewart City, Steinhatchee	
Steinhatchee River				Bridge	
Taylor	Tennille	186.411	299.999	SR 51 – Steinhatchee, Stewart City, Mayo	
Taylor	Pinland	207.083	333.268	South Red Padgett Road	former SR 356 east
Taylor		209.870	337.753	CR 361 south – Keaton Beach, Dekle Beach	
Taylor		210.663	339.029	CR 356A east (Red Padgett Road)	
Taylor		211.096	339.726	CR 30 east – Foley	former SR 30 east / SR 30A west
Taylor		211.929	341.067	Industrial Park Drive - Taylor Technical Institute	former SR 362 west
Taylor	Perry	213.643	343.825	US 221 north (Jefferson Street / SR 55) / CR 361A south (Puckett Road) – Downtown Perry	north end of SR 55 overlap; south end of US 221 Truck / SR 30 overlap
Taylor	Perry	214.672	345.481	US 27 south / US 98 west (Hampton Springs Avenue / SR 20 east / SR 30 west) – Mayo	north end of US 27 Alt. / US 98 / SR 30 overlap; south end of US 27 / SR 20 overlap
see US 27 (mile 422.350-451.558)
Jefferson	Capps	243.880	392.487	US 27 north (SR 20 west) – Tallahassee	north end of US 27 / SR 20 overlap; south end of SR 57 overlap
Jefferson		248.288	399.581	CR 158 west	
Jefferson		248.412	399.780	CR 139 south	
Jefferson		248.63	400.13	I-10 (SR 8) – Tallahassee, Lake City	I-10 Exit 225
Jefferson	Drifton	249.792	402.001	CR 57A north (David Road)	
Jefferson	Drifton	250.327	402.862	CR 158 east (Aucilla Highway) – Jefferson Correctional Institution	
Jefferson	Monticello	251.999	405.553	CR 259 south (Waukeenah Highway) – Waukeenah	
Jefferson	Monticello	253.626	408.171	US 90 (Washington Street / SR 10) – Tallahassee, Greenville	traffic circle around Jefferson County Courthouse
Jefferson	Texas Hill	254.785	410.037	CR 149 north (Boston Highway) / CR 259 north	
Jefferson		261.968	421.597	US 19 north / SR 3 north / SR 300 north – Thomasville, Ochlocknee	Georgia state line
1.000 mi = 1.609 km; 1.000 km = 0.621 mi: Concurrency terminus; Electronic toll collection

U.S. Route 19
Previous state: Terminus	Florida	Next state: Georgia
