= List of county roads in Madison County, Florida =

- County road shields used in Florida

Highway names
- Interstates: Interstate X (I-X)
- US Highways: U.S. Highway X (US X)
- State: State Road X (SR X)
- County: County Road X (CR X)

System links
- County roads in Florida; County roads in Madison County

The following is a list of county roads in Madison County, Florida. All county roads are maintained by the county in which they reside.

== County roads in Madison County, Florida ==
Route	Road Name(s)	From	To	Notes
CR 14		CR 14 at the Taylor County line southeast of Ebb	SR 14 southwest of Madison	Former SR 14
CR 53		CR 53 at the Lafayette County line south-southeast of Lee	SR 53 southwest of Lee	Former SR 53
CR 140		US 221 (SR 55) north of Greenville	CR 150 northeast of Greenville	Former SR 140
CR 141	Myrrh Road	NE Myrrh Street in Suwannee River State Park east-southeast of Lee	CR 141 at the Hamilton County line east of Lee	Unsigned
CR 146	Little Cat Road	SR 53 north of Madison	Empress Road at the Georgia state line north-northwest of Madison	Former SR 146
CR 150	SW Overstreet Avenue NW Lovett Road; NW Little Cat Road NE Bellville Road	US 19 / US 27 (SR 20) / Wyoming Street south-southwest of Greenville US 90 (SR 10) east of Greenville SR 145 / NE Persimmon Drive in Pinetta	US 221 (SR 55) south of Greenville SR 145 / NE Eucalyptus Street south-southwest of Pinetta CR 152 at the Hamilton County line east of Pinetta	Former SR 150
CR 158	Sundown Creek Road	US 221 (SR 55) south of Greenville	CR 14 south-southwest of Madison	Former SR 158
CR 253	NE Cherry Lake Circle	Milton Road at the Georgia state line north-northwest of Madison SR 53 north-northwest of Madison	SR 53 north-northwest of Madison CR 253 north of Madison	Former SR 253
CR 254	NE Dusty Miller Avenue	SR 145 north-northeast of Madison	CR 255 northeast of Madison	Former SR 254
CR 255	NE Hickory Grove Road; NE Dusty Miller Avenue	CR 53 south-southeast of Lee	CR 150 east-southeast of Pinetta	Former SR 255
CR 360	SW Moseley Hall Road	US 221 (SR 55) in Ebb	SR 14 south-southwest of Madison	Former SR 360
CR 360A	SW Martin Luther King Jr. Drive	SR 14 southwest of Madison	US 90 (SR 10) / NW Crane Avenue in Madison	Former SR 360A
CR 591	NE Rocky Ford Road	SR 145 in Madison	CR 150 / NE Rootman Road west-southwest of Pinetta	
