= List of county roads in Jefferson County, Florida =

- County road shields used in Florida

Highway names
- Interstates: Interstate X (I-X)
- US Highways: U.S. Highway X (US X)
- State: State Road X (SR X)
- County: County Road X (CR X)

System links
- County roads in Florida; County roads in Jefferson County

The following is a list of county roads in Jefferson County, Florida. All county roads are maintained by the county in which they reside.

== County roads in Jefferson County ==
Route	Road Name(s)	From	To	Notes
CR 3	West Lake Road	New Monticello Road / West Lake Road northwest of Monticello	CR 259A north of Monticello	Unsigned
CR 57A	David Road; Marcie Road; Horne Road	US 19 (SR 57) in Drifton	CR 158 in Drifton	Former SR 57A
CR 59		I-10 (SR 8) / SR 59 north-northwest of Lloyd	CR 142 at the Leon County line north-northwest of Lloyd	
CR 139	Ebenezer Road; Pafford Road	Hatchett Road northeast of Nash	US 19 (SR 57) north-northeast of Nash	Unsigned on CR 139 itself, but there is signage on US 19 (SR 57). Also, it is not marked on FDOT's Jefferson County map.
CR 142	Lake Road	CR 142 at the Leon County line northwest of Festus	CR 259A / Oetinger Road north-northwest of Monticello	Former SR 142
CR 146	St. Margaret's Church Road; Ashville Highway	US 90 (SR 10) east of Monticello	US 221 (SR 55) in Ashville	Former SR 146
CR 149	Boston Highway	CR 259A north of Monticello	Boston–Monticello Road at the Georgia state line north-northeast of Monticello	Former SR 149
CR 149A	Dills Road	CR 149 north-northeast of Monticello	Brock Road / Faglie Cemetery / Groover Road in Dills	Former SR 149A
CR 158	Old Lloyd Road Aucilla Highway	CR 1540 at the Leon County line west-northwest of Lloyd US 19 (SR 57) in Drifton	CR 158A / CR 158B east-northeast of Lloyd CR 257 / Tinnell Street in Aucilla	Former SR 158; part of the Old Spanish Trail Former SR 158
CR 158A	Old Lloyd Road	CR 158 / CR 158B east-northeast of Lloyd	US 90 (SR 10) west of Monticello	Part of the Old Spanish Trail
CR 158B	Rabon Road Nash Road	CR 158 / CR 158A east-northeast of Lloyd CR 259 southwest of Drifton	CR 259 west-northwest of Drifton US 19 (SR 57) north-northeast of Nash	Former SR 158 Former SR 158B
CR 257	Salt Road	US 90 (SR 10) north-northwest of Aucilla	CR 257C / Bassett Dairy Road north-northwest of Aucilla	Former SR 257
CR 257A	Salt Road	CR 14 at the Taylor County line south-southwest of Lamont	US 19 / US 27 (SR 20) in Lamont	Former SR 257
CR 257B	Salt Road	US 19 / US 27 (SR 20) in Lamont	I-10 (SR 8) south-southwest of Aucilla	Former SR 257
CR 257C		CR 257 north-northwest of Aucilla	Salt Road / Milton Road north of Aucilla	Former SR 257
CR 259	Waukeenah Highway	CR 259 at the Leon County line west-northwest of Cody	US 19 (SR 57) / Nacoosa Road south of Monticello	Former SR 259
CR 259A	Lake Road	US 19 (SR 57) / Texas Hill Road north of Monticello	CR 142 / Oetinger Road north-northwest of Monticello	Unsigned; former SR 259
