= Florida State Road 55 =

Highway in Florida

State Road 55

Route information
- Maintained by FDOT
- Length: 259.700 mi (417.947 km)
- Existed: 1945–present

Major junctions
- South end: US 41 / SR 684 near Bradenton
- I-275 in St. Petersburg; SR 60 in Clearwater; SR 50 in Weeki Wachee; SR 44 in Crystal River; US 129 in Chiefland; US 19 / US 27 / US 98 in Perry; US 90 in Greenville
- North end: US 221 / SR 76 towards Quitman, GA

Location
- Country: United States
- State: Florida
- Counties: Manatee, Hillsborough, Pinellas, Pasco, Hernando, Citrus, Levy, Gilchrist, Dixie, Taylor, Madison, Jefferson

Highway system
- Florida State Highway System; Interstate; US; State; Former; Pre‑1945; Toll; Scenic
← SR 54	→ SR 56

State Road 55 (SR 55) is mainly the internal or secret designation of U.S. Route 19 through Florida, although it has appeared on maps and atlases on several occasions. State Road 55 originates at the Georgia state line north of Ashville and ends at SR 684 in Bradenton. North of Perry, it is the secret route for US 221, continuing north into Georgia as Georgia State Route 76. South of Memphis, it is a secret designation for US 41; it is also a secret designation for US 301 in the Bradenton–Palmetto area, along a segment co-signed with US 41.

Very little evidence of SR 55's existence can be found, except in Levy, Dixie, and Taylor counties. In Dixie County, for example, there's a CR 55A in Old Town and Fanning Springs. In Chiefland, US 19's status as SR 55 is exposed in street-name signs and one shield south of US 27 ALT.

== Route description ==
SR 55 begins at the eastern terminus of unsigned SR 684 in Bradenton, Florida, which heads west as US 41. The road is the hidden state road for US 41, heading north. SR 55 serves as the northern terminus for hidden State Road 683, but not its exposed route US 301. From this point, it is the hidden route for a concurrency of US 41 and 301. After the intersection with SR 64, US 41-301-SR 55 concludes its journey through Bradenton and crosses the Hernando Desoto Bridge over the Manatee River and enters Palmetto. The concurrency ends when US 301 makes a sharp right turn onto SR 43 at a diamond interchange, and SR 55 becomes a hidden route only of US 41 again. Right after an interchange with the northern terminus of US 41 BUS, SR 45 shares the hidden concurrency with US 41, but almost instantly, SR 55 meets another interchange with US 19 in Memphis and moves onto that road, only to join I-275 (State Road 93) at Exit 5, where they both use the Sunshine Skyway Bridge. At Exit 17, SR 55 leaves I-275 and resumes its role as the hidden route along US 19 once again, as it will do throughout most of the west coast of the state.

In Pasco County, despite the fact that US 19 ALT terminates in Holiday, its hidden route State Road 595 secretly joins US 19-SR 55 only to branch off a few blocks later as County Road 595 on Mile Stretch Road. CR 595 is encountered again without any markings from New Port Richey to Aripeka, where shields can actually be found approaching Aripeka Road. In Hernando County, the road appears again as County Road 595, which terminates at the gateway to Hernando Beach, Florida. This terminus is across from the intersection of County Road 574, a road that serves as the gateway to Spring Hill, Florida.

US 98 joins US 19 in Chassahowitzka, where State Road 700 ends. From here, it becomes the hidden state route of both US 19 and 98. Further northwest in Homosassa Springs, US 19-98-SR 55 takes County Road 490 with it as all four routes pass by the entrance to Homosassa Springs Wildlife State Park. A block after the eastern terminus of County Road 490A, CR 490 branches off to the east as it heads towards Lecanto.

After entering Crystal River and passing by the Crystal River Airport, SR 55 encounters the eastern terminus of County Road 44W, which secretly joins the road to meet the western terminus of State Road 44.

The at-grade interchange with State Road 121 in Lebanon Station also includes County Road 336 and secretly takes the road with it to a local street in Otter Creek.

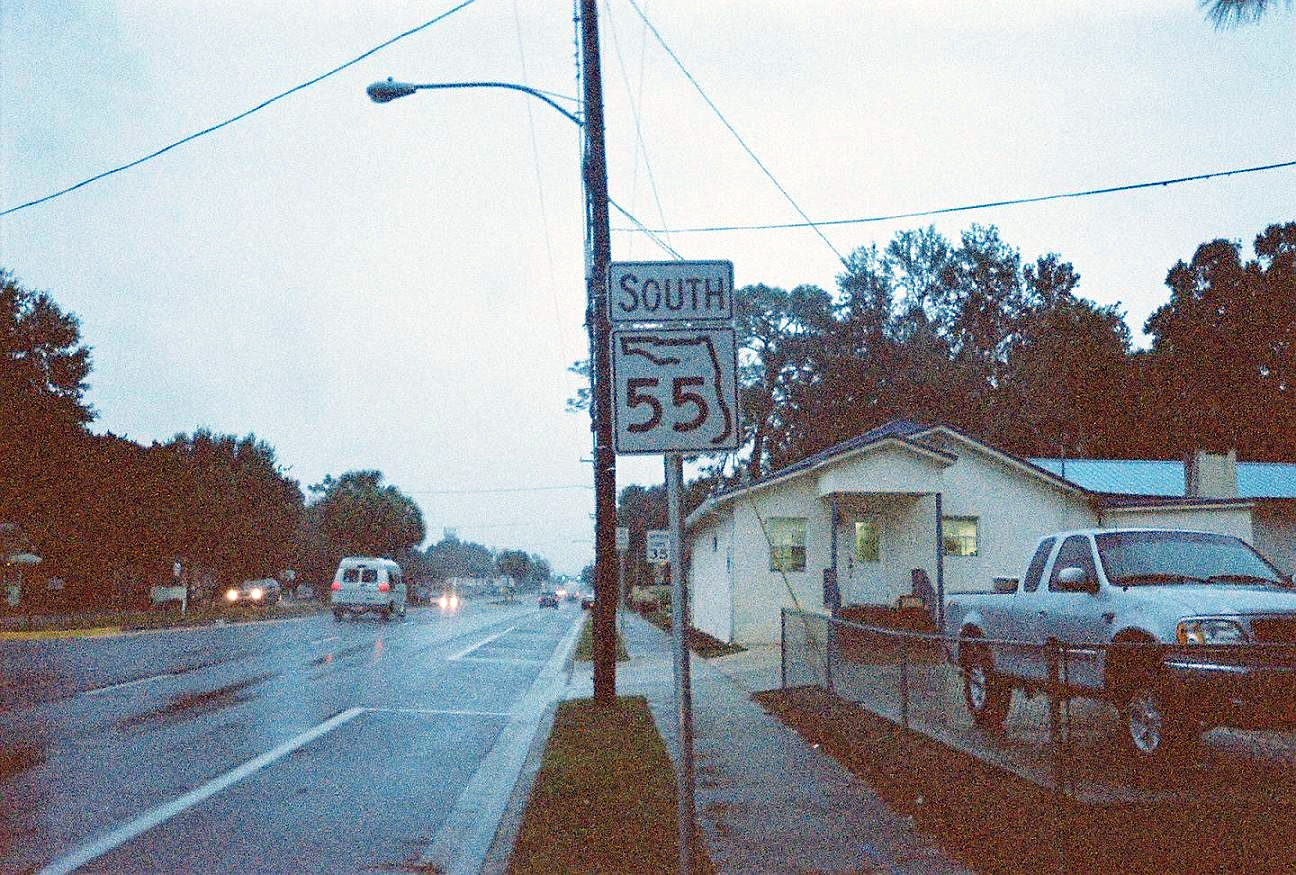
SR 55 shield on US 19-98 in Chiefland, Florida

US 27 ALT joins US 19-98 in Chiefland, where State Road 500 ends. From here, it becomes the hidden state route of US 19, 98, and ALT 27, and instantly intersects US 129, which at one time shared the intersection with US 27 ALT. Still in Chiefland, US 19-98-Alt. 27-SR 55 encounters the eastern terminus of State Road 320, which joins these roads for several blocks before turning east and becoming County Road 320.

In the City of Perry, State Road 30 joins US 19-98-Alt 27, and SR 55 moves onto US 221. The road narrows down to two lanes at the intersection of US 27, although trucks must use a detour. Intersections north of here include CR 14 (an extension of SR 14) in Shady Grove, an interchange with Interstate 10, and a brief concurrency with US 90 in Greenville before finally terminating at the Georgia State Line, where US 221 continues onto Georgia State Route 76.

== Major intersections ==
County	Location	mi	km	Destinations	Notes
Manatee		0.000	0.000	US 41 south (Cortez Road / SR 684 west) / 44th Avenue Connection	
Manatee	see US 41 (mile 225.226-231.305)				
Manatee		6.079	9.783	US 41 north (SR 45) – Port Manatee, Tampa	north end of US 41 / SR 45 overlap; south end of US 19 overlap
see US 19 (mile 0.000-213.643)
Taylor	Perry	219.722	353.608	US 19 north / US 27 Alt. north / US 98 north / US 221 Truck north (Byron Butler Parkway / SR 30 west) – Tallahassee CR 361A south (Puckett Road)	north end of US 19 / US 27 Alt. / US 98 overlap; south end of US 221 overlap
see US 221 (mile 0.000-39.978)
Jefferson		259.700	417.947	US 221 north / SR 76 east – Quitman	Georgia state line
1.000 mi = 1.609 km; 1.000 km = 0.621 mi

== Related routes ==
=== Dixie County ===
County Road 55A
- Location: Eugene – Old Town

County Road 55A is an east-west county road that runs along the south side of SR 55 between Eugene and Old Town, just west of the Suwannee River.

=== Levy and Gilchrist Counties ===
County Road 55A
- Location: Fanning Springs

East of the Suwannee River, County Road 55A is a north-south bi-county road entirely within the City of Fanning Springs that connects US 19-ALT 27-98 with State Road 26.
