= Florida State Road 14 =

Highway in Florida, US

State Road 14
- SR 14 in red, truck route in pink, related county roads in blue

Route information
- Maintained by FDOT
- Length: 3.903 mi (6.281 km)
- Existed: 1945 renumbering (definition)–present

Major junctions
- West end: I-10 / CR 14 near Madison
- East end: SR 53 in Madison

Location
- Country: United States
- State: Florida
- Counties: Madison

Highway system
- Florida State Highway System; Interstate; US; State; Former; Pre‑1945; Toll; Scenic
← SR 13	→ SR 15

State Road 14 (SR 14) is a northeast-southwest route in Madison County, Florida. The western terminus is near an interchange with Interstate 10 (unsigned SR 8) and County Road 14 (CR 14) near Madison; the eastern terminus is an intersection with Duval Street (SR 53) in the city of Madison itself.

== Route description ==
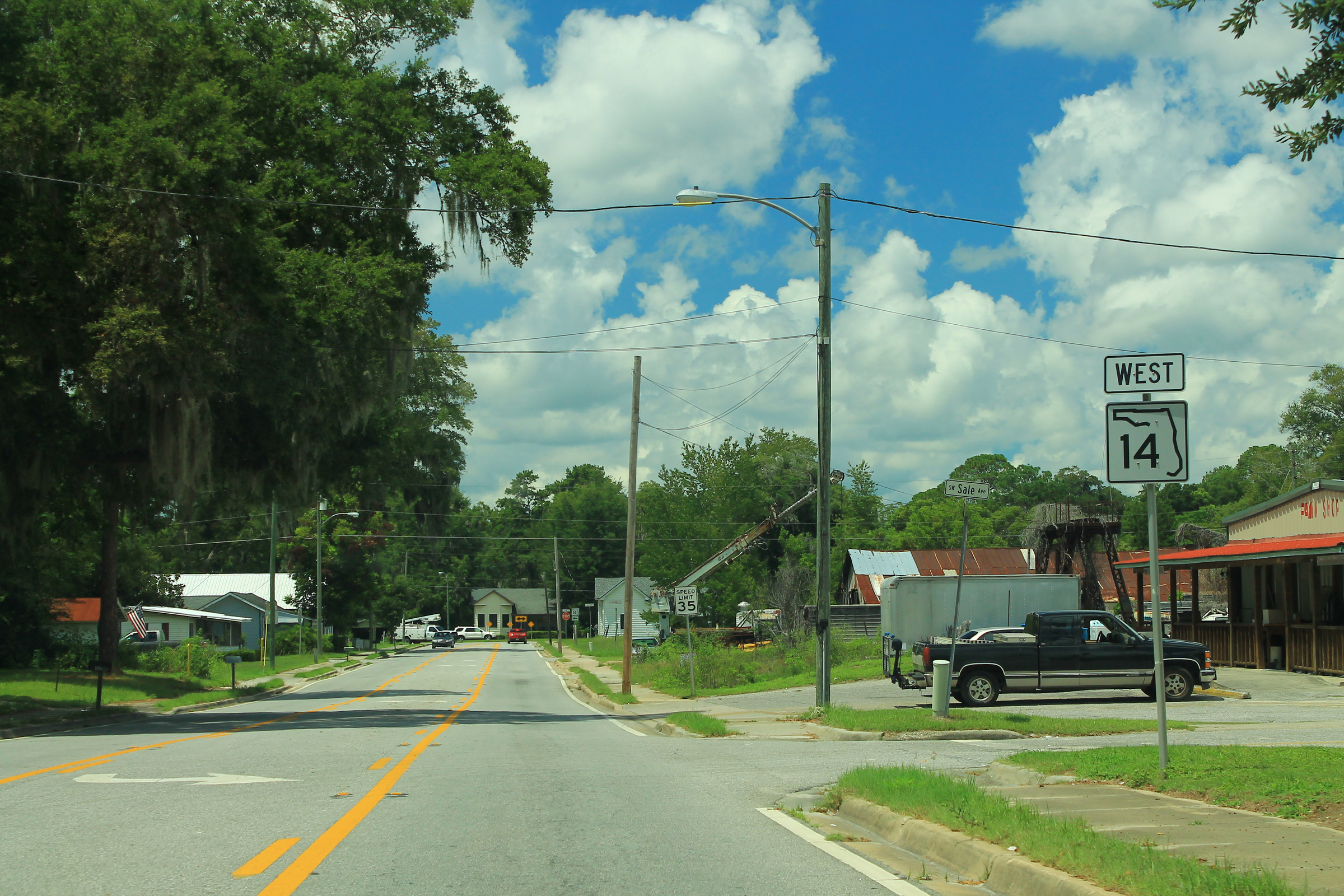
Looking west from SR 14's northern terminus

The southwestern continuation of SR 14 (which ends at an interchange with Interstate 10 at exit 251) is County Road 14, intersecting with U.S. Route 221 (US 221, unsigned SR 55) in Shady Grove before taking a more westerly route (with the former State Road 14A, now County Road 14A, straddling the Econfina River for four miles (6 km) just west of Shady Grove) and reaching its terminus, an intersection with US 19/27 (unsigned SR 20) in Eridu.

An additional segment of former SR 14 is located in Taylor County, running from the bridge over the Aucilla River at the Jefferson County line (the road continuing north as CR 257) south across US 98 to a terminus at the Econfina River State Park.

== Major intersections ==
County	Location	mi	km	Destinations	Notes
Taylor	Eridu	0.000	0.000	US 19 / US 27 (SR 20)	
Taylor	Shady Grove	6.8	10.9	CR 14A west	
Taylor	Shady Grove	7.238	11.648	US 221 (SR 55) to I-10 – Greenville, Perry	
Madison		16.021	25.783	CR 360 west (Southwest Moseley Hall Road)	west end of CR 360 overlap
Madison		17.798	28.643	CR 360 east	east end of CR 360 overlap
Madison		19.8	31.9	CR 158 west (Southwest Sundown Creek Road)	
Madison		22.855	36.782	west end of state maintenance	
Madison		22.99	37.00	I-10 (SR 8) – Tallahassee, Lake City	I-10 exit 251
Madison		23.356	37.588	CR 360A east	
Madison		25.172	40.510	CR 360 west – Madison Correctional Institution	
Madison		25.433	40.930	SR 14 Truck east (Harvey Greene Drive)	
Madison	Madison	26.564	42.751	Southwest Range Avenue - Downtown Madison	
Madison	Madison	26.758	43.063	SR 53 (South Duval Avenue) – North Florida Community College	
1.000 mi = 1.609 km; 1.000 km = 0.621 mi: Concurrency terminus; Route transition

== State Road 14 Truck ==
State Road 14 Truck
- Location: Madison
- Length: 1.8 mi (2.9 km)

From the eastern terminus of SR 14 southeastward, part of SR 53 carries the additional designation of State Road 14 Truck, a rare bannered state road in Florida. The truck route then turns west on Harvey Greene Drive to rejoin SR 14. It bypasses a portion of SR 14 in Madison from which trucks are banned, adding about 1/2 mile (0.80 km) to the distance.
