= U.S. Route 221 in Florida =

Segment of American highway

U.S. Highway 221
- US 221 highlighted in red

Route information
- Maintained by FDOT
- Length: 39.978 mi (64.338 km)
- Existed: 1930–present

Major junctions
- South end: US 19 / US 27 Alt. / US 98 / CR 361A in Perry
- US 27 in Perry; CR 14 at Shady Grove; I-10 near Greenville; US 90 in Greenville
- North end: US 221 / SR 76 towards Quitman, GA

Location
- Country: United States
- State: Florida
- Counties: Taylor, Madison, Jefferson

Highway system
- United States Numbered Highway System; List; Special; Divided; Florida State Highway System; Interstate; US; State; Former; Pre‑1945; Toll; Scenic
← SR 212	→ SR 222

U.S. Route 221 (US 221) in Florida is a north–south United States Highway. It runs 40 miles (64 km) from Perry northwest to the Georgia State Line in Taylor, Madison and Jefferson Counties. The entire route is inventoried by FDOT as the northern section of unsigned State Road 55. A short overlap with US 90 exists in Greenville.

== Route description ==
U.S. Route 221 begins its northward journey in the City of Perry at the intersection of US 19-98-Alt 27 at the northern terminus of CR 361A. US Truck Route 221 also begins at this intersection, but runs along US 19-98-ALT 27. North of the terminus of CR 335, the road narrows down to two lanes at the intersection of US 27, which includes another leg of the truck detour. North of US 27, Route 221 crosses a bridge over Spring Creek and then meets a pair of at-grade crossings with railroad line owned by Georgia and Florida Railroad, which leads to a branch of the Georgia Southern and Florida Railway further north. Nearby it passes by a former Live Oak, Perry and Gulf Railroad station and then the Perry City Hall, and more than several blocks north of that point crosses another bridge over Pimple Creek just south of the intersection of County Road 356 (Ash Street). Intersections north of the city limits include County Road 359A, which is also the northern terminus of US Truck Route 221, and later County Road 361. The aforementioned G&F Railroad line meets up with the west side of US 221, but runs parallel with it throughout Taylor County, even as they both approach CR 14 (an extension of SR 14) in Shady Grove.

US 221 and the G&F Railway Line continue to run parallel to each other as they cross the Taylor-Madison County Line, and for the most part tends to intersect only local and private roads of no importance, until it approaches the western terminus of CR 360 (Moseley Hall Road). A local street named Open Sands Loop terminates at both ends of US 221, but the road moves away from the railroad line curving to the northeast just south of the northern terminus of this street. North of the western terminus of Former State Road 158, the road turns back north and becomes a divided highway ahead of the interchange with Interstate 10 at Exit 241. The divided highway ends north of this interchange, and the road continues to wind through the woods of the central Florida Panhandle.

The brown US 221 shield used in Florida prior to 1993

Just before entering the Greenville Town Limits US 21 intersects with County Road 150. US 221 then crosses a former Seaboard Air Line Railroad line that was used by Amtrak Silver Meteor until 2005. The former SAL freight depot lies just to the east of the railroad crossing. As the road approaches the historic Bishop-Andrews Hotel, US 221 turns west onto US 90. Together US 90-221 passes by some local industry and the Haffye Hays Park, a local park that contains a memorial to Ray Charles. The routes cross the G&F Railroad line it ran next to in Perry and Taylor County on the east side of Leggett Street, and a block later US 221 finally leaves US 90 to run north as it is intended to do. One last moderate intersection can be found outside of the town limits in the form of the southern terminus of County Road 140 (Old Equipment Road). North of there. CR 140 is encountered again, but it crosses the road heading to the east toward some cemeteries near CR 150.

Upon crossing the Madison-Jefferson County Line, US 221 changes from the westernmost US route in Madison County, to the easternmost in Jefferson County. The only community resembling a major municipality within the county though is Ashville, and the only major street within the county is the eastern terminus of CR 146, but not the eastern terminus of Ashville Highway, which crosses over into Madison County. One last intersection with a private road north of Ashville can be found before US 221 finally crosses the Georgia State Line, where the road continues onto Georgia State Route 76, while hidden State Road 55 terminates.

== Major intersections ==
County	Location	mi	km	Destinations	Notes
Taylor	Perry	0.000	0.000	US 19 / US 98 / US 27 Alt. (Byron Butler Parkway / SR 30 west / SR 55 south / US 221 Truck north) / CR 361A south (Puckett Road) – Cross City, St. Petersburg, Tallahassee	Southern terminus of US 221 Truck
Taylor	Perry	0.762	1.226	CR 30 east (South Old Dixie Highway)	
Taylor	Perry	0.914	1.471	US 27 (Hampton Springs Avenue / SR 20) to US 221 Truck north	
Taylor	Perry	2.065	3.323	Ash Street (CR 356)	
Taylor		3.384	5.446	US 221 Truck south / CR 359A west (Wright Road)	Northern terminus of US 221 Truck
Taylor		4.695	7.556	Pisgah Road (CR 361 west)	
Taylor		5.225	8.409	Roberts Aman Road (CR 361 east)	
Taylor	Shady Grove	13.469	21.676	CR 14 – Madison	
Madison	Sirmans	18.324	29.490	CR 360 east (Southwest Moseley Hall Road)	
Madison		23.833	38.355	CR 158 east (Southwest Sundown Creek Road)	
Madison		24.37	39.22	I-10 (SR 8) – Lake City, Tallahassee	Exit 241 (I-10)
Madison		26.289	42.308	CR 150 west (Southwest Overstreet Avenue)	
Madison	Greenville	26.930	43.340	US 90 east (SR 10) – Madison	Southern end of US 90 / SR 10 concurrency
Madison	Greenville	27.241	43.840	US 90 west (SR 10) – Monticello	Northern end of US 90 / SR 10 concurrency
Madison		27.622	44.453	CR 140 north	
Madison		29.462	47.414	CR 140	
Jefferson	Ashville	37.456	60.280	CR 146 west (Ashville Highway) – Monticello	
Jefferson		39.978	64.338	US 221 north / SR 76 east – Quitman	Georgia state line
1.000 mi = 1.609 km; 1.000 km = 0.621 mi: Concurrency terminus

== See also ==
U.S. Route 221
Previous state: Terminus	Florida	Next state: Georgia
