= Pimple (disambiguation) =

A pimple is a swollen spot on the skin.

Pimple may also refer to:

- The Pimple, a mountain in Antarctica
- Pimple Creek, a river in Florida
- Pimple Hill, a summit in Pennsylvania
- Pimple Hills, a mountain range in New Jersey
- Pimple (film series), a series of short silent films featuring the British comedian Fred Evans
