= Econfina =

Econfina may refer to:

- Econfina Creek, a small river in Jackson, Washington and Bay Counties, Florida
- Econfina River, a small river in Taylor County, Florida
- Econfina River State Park, on the Econfina River
