= Carbur, Florida =

Former company town in Florida, US

Coordinates: 29°55′06″N 83°25′41″W

Carbur is a former company town developed by the lumber industry in Taylor County, Florida, which operated several lumber camps around the settlement. Carbur is named for the two companies that collaborated to exploit the swampy area's cypress forests: Carpenter-O'Brien Lumber Company and Burton-Swartz Lumber Company.

== Background ==
In 1917, Carpenter-O'Brien sold its Florida operations to the Brooks-Scanlon Corporation after a damaging fire at its Jacksonville sawmill. Brooks-Scanlon negotiated with the Atlantic Coast Line Railroad for lumber transport but to no avail. In 1928, it removed its sawmill and rebuilt it south of Perry, Florida in the town of Foley, Florida, named for the president of Brooks-Scanlon J.S. Foley.

The State of Florida photographic archives include images of logging operations and rail engines operating in the Cabur area. Skidders were used to stack logs. A 1914 letter in Florida health department publication Florida Health Notes lauded a doctors efforts to improve health conditions at the lumber camp. In the 1916 State Board of Health annual report it was noted the entire area around Carbur was swampy and malaria was a problem. Screens and clearing around the settlement as well as upgraded healthcare services were recommended.
