= Bucell Junction, Florida =

- Unincorporated area
- Location within Florida
- Coordinates: 30°4′11″N 83°33′21″W
- Country: United States
- State: Florida
- County: Taylor
- Time zone: UTC-5 (Eastern (EST))
  - Summer (DST): UTC-4 (EDT)

Bucell Junction is an unincorporated area of Taylor County, Florida south of Perry, Florida. It may have been named for a transit junction near the Buckeye Cellulose Plant. Bucell Junction is near the Fenholloway River and Atlantic Camp Ground Spring. The Buckey Cellulose Plant was located east of Bucell Junction in Foley, Florida and is now the Georgia Pacific Foley Plant. The unincorporated area of Buckeye, Florida is located just north of the plant. Water pollution from the cellulose plant has been an ongoing issue. The plant is a major employer in the area.
