= Shady Grove, Taylor County, Florida =

Shady Grove, Florida
- Unincorporated community
- Location within Florida
- Coordinates: 30°17′17″N 83°37′55″W
- Country: United States
- State: Florida
- County: Taylor
- Elevation: 82 ft (25 m)
- Time zone: UTC-5 (Eastern (EST))
  - Summer (DST): UTC-4 (EDT)
- ZIP code: 32357
- Area code: 850
- GNIS feature ID: 290897

Shady Grove is an unincorporated community in Taylor County, Florida, United States, along U.S. Route 221, 12.1 miles (19.5 km) north-northwest of Perry. Shady Grove has a post office with ZIP code 32357.
