= Pinetta, Florida =

- Unincorporated community
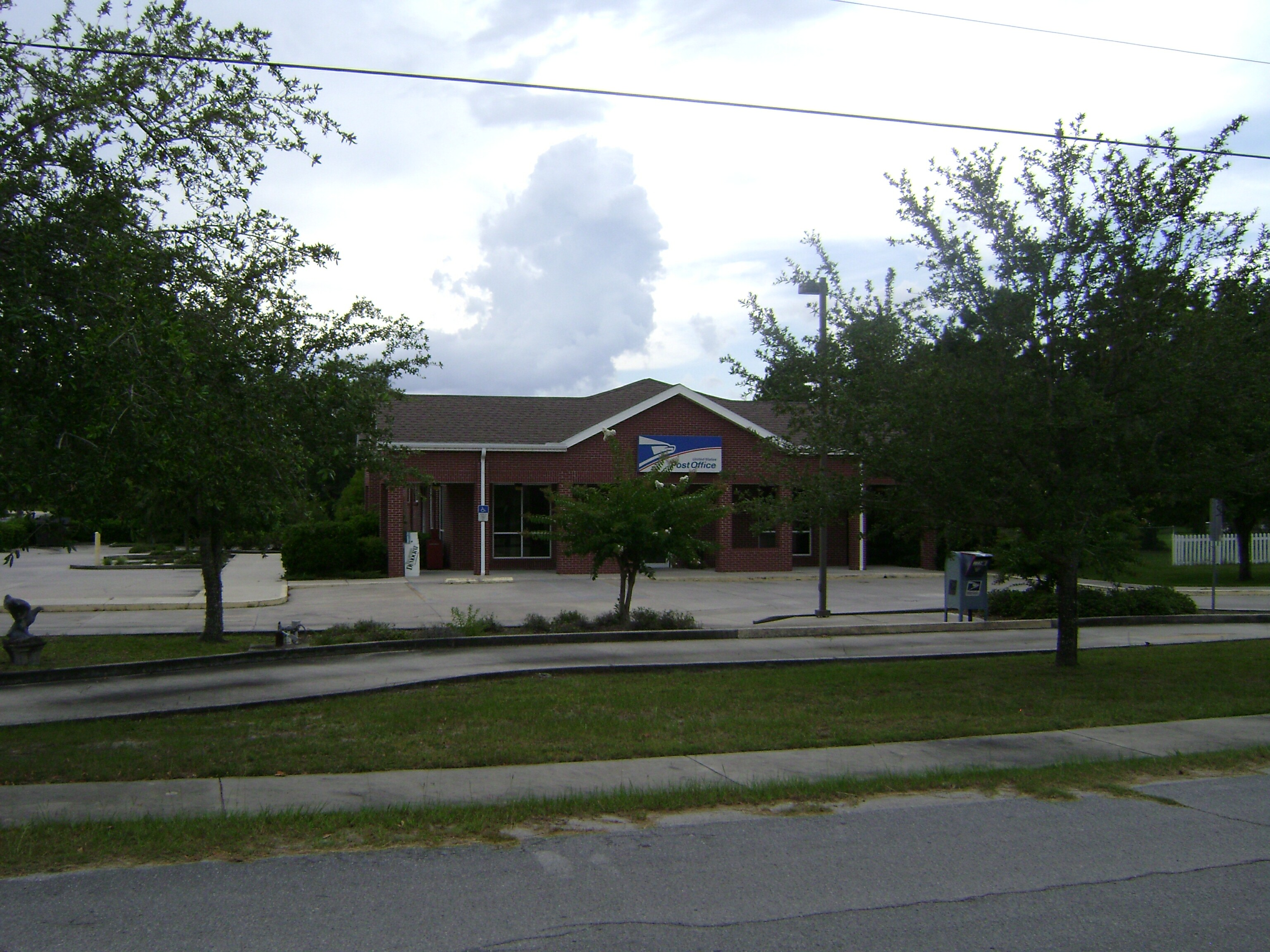
- Post office

- Location within Florida Location within the United States
- Coordinates: 30°35′39″N 83°21′09″W
- Country: United States
- State: Florida
- County: Madison
- Elevation: 154 ft (47 m)
- Time zone: UTC-5 (Eastern (EST))
  - Summer (DST): UTC-4 (EDT)
- ZIP code: 32350
- Area code: 850
- GNIS feature ID: 288941

Pinetta is an unincorporated community in Madison County, Florida, United States. The community is located on Florida State Road 145, 9.3 miles (15.0 km) north-northeast of Madison. Pinetta has a post office with ZIP code 32350, which opened on May 4, 1891.

== Education ==
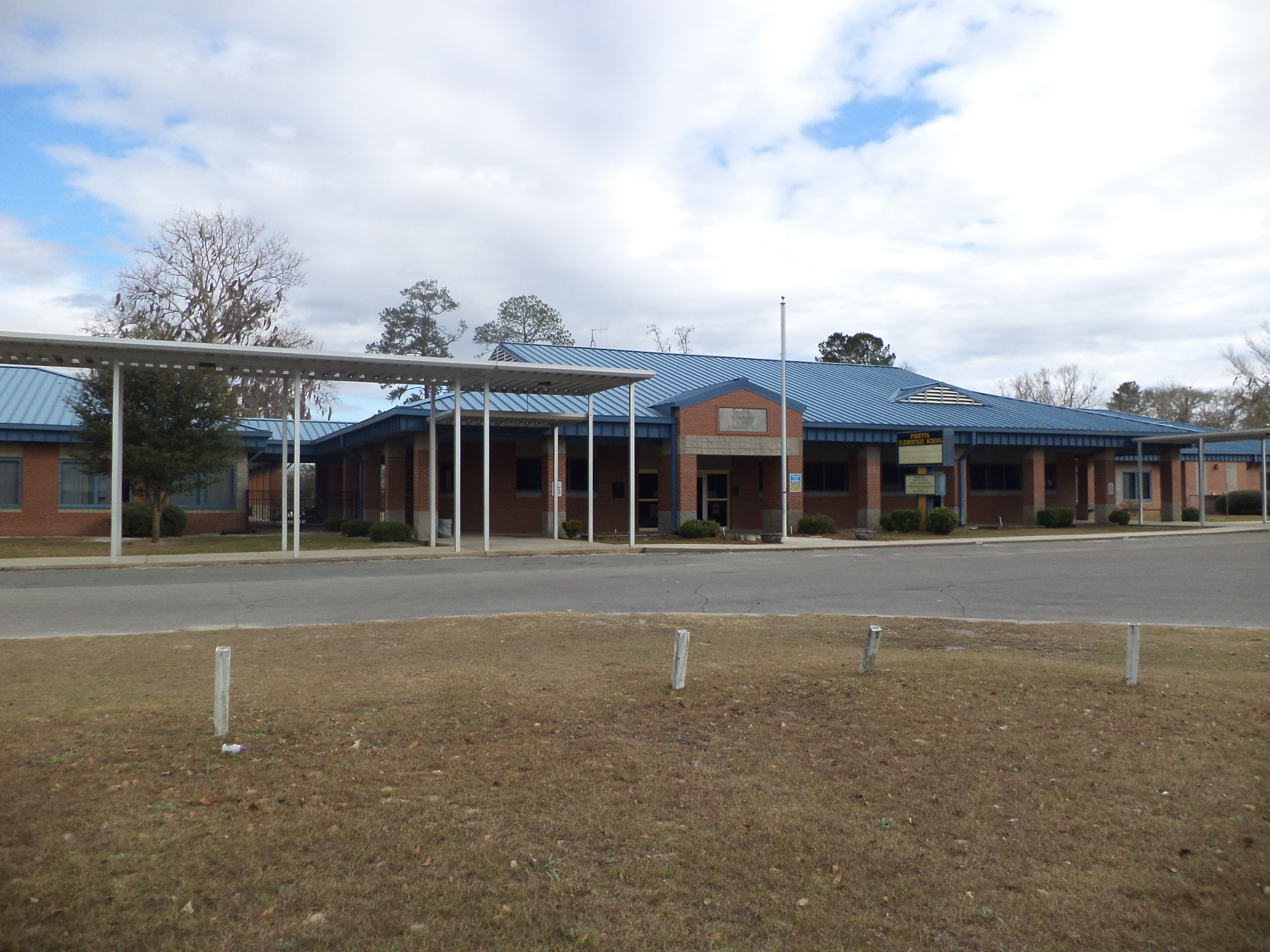
Pinetta Elementary School

Pinetta Elementary School is a part of the District School Board of Madison County. Secondary school students go to the PreK-8 Madison County Central School, which serves Pinetta students for middle school, and Madison County High School.
