= Salem, Florida =

- Unincorporated community
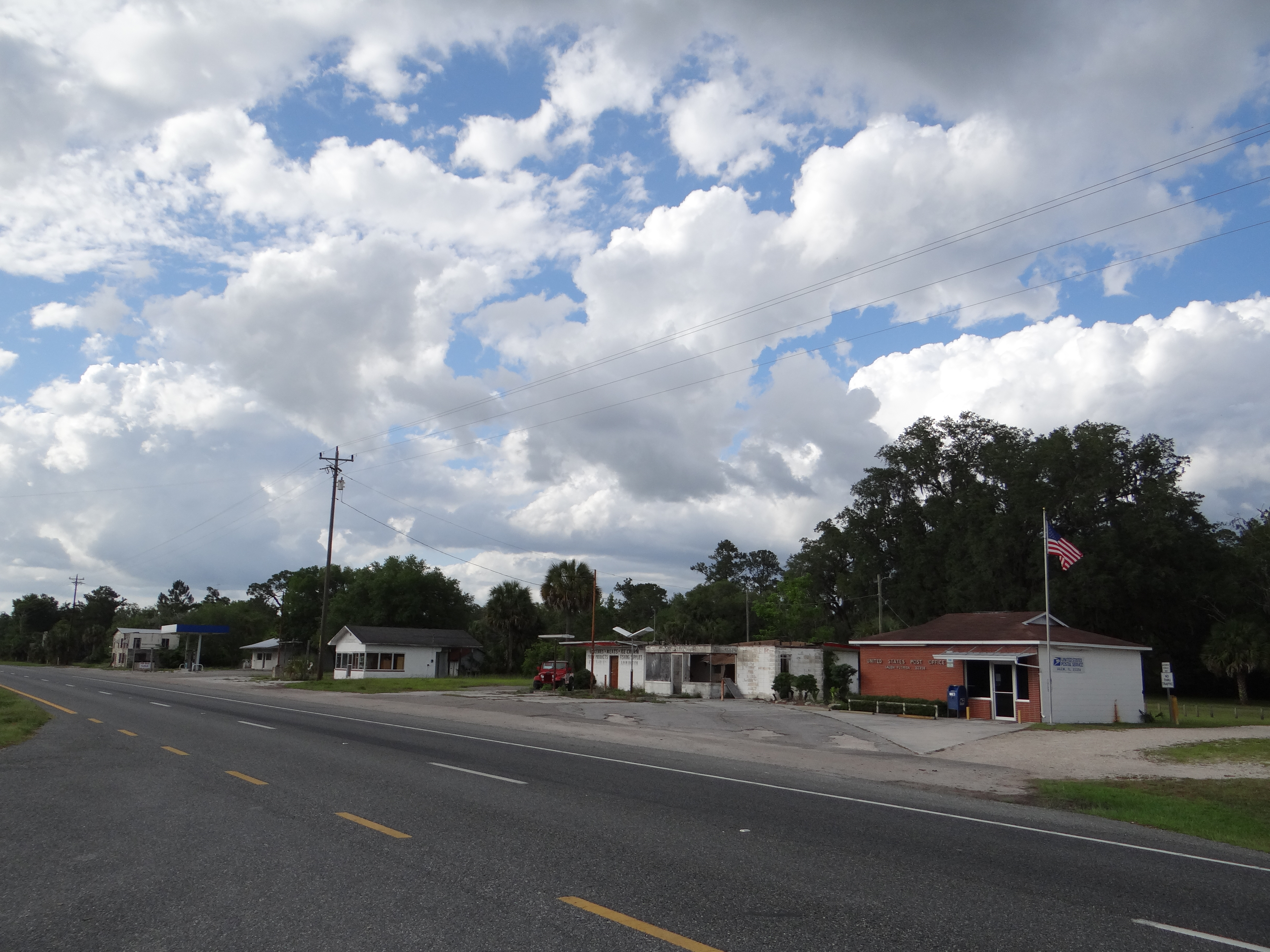
- Post office

- Location within Florida
- Coordinates: 29°53′13″N 83°24′47″W
- Country: United States
- State: Florida
- County: Taylor
- Elevation: 39 ft (12 m)
- Time zone: UTC-5 (Eastern (EST))
  - Summer (DST): UTC-4 (EDT)
- ZIP code: 32356
- Area code: 850
- GNIS feature ID: 294916

Salem is an unincorporated community in Taylor County, Florida, United States. The community is located on U.S. Route 19, 19 miles (31 km) southeast of Perry. Salem has a post office with ZIP code 32356, which opened on April 16, 1915.
