= List of county roads in Taylor County, Florida =

- County road shields used in Florida

Highway names
- Interstates: Interstate X (I-X)
- US Highways: U.S. Highway X (US X)
- State: State Road X (SR X)
- County: County Road X (CR-X)

System links
- County roads in Florida; County roads in Taylor County

The following is a list of county roads in Taylor County, Florida, United States. All county roads are maintained by the county in which they reside.

This list includes only those county roads that are numbered in the statewide grid, not those with locally-assigned numbers.

== County roads in Taylor County ==
Route	Road Name(s)	From	To	Notes
CR 14		Econfina River State Park	Taylor-Jefferson County line (CR 257A)	former SR 14
CR 14	Mount Gilead Road	US 19-27	Taylor-Madison County Line	former SR 14
CR 14A		CR 14	CR 14	former SR 14A
CR 30	Foley Road; Old Dixie Highway	US 19 / US 27 Alt. / US 98; US 221	US 27	former SR 30; Old Dixie Highway is inventoried by FDOT as CR 2131
CR 30A	Holt Road; Carlton Cemetery Road	CR 359	US 19-98-ALT 27	former SR 30A; Carlton Cemetery Road is inventoried by FDOT as CR 2132
CR 356		Thomas Mill	US 19 / US 27 Alt. / US 98, Pinland	former SR 356
CR 356A	Red Padgett Road	US 19 / US 27 Alt. / US 98	CR 356	former SR 356A
CR 356B	Miller Road	CR 356	US 19 / US 27	former SR 356B
CR 356C	Buckeye Credit Union Road, Foley Cut-off Road	CR 356A	US 27	former SR 356C
CR 358	10th Street East	1st Avenue South	Steinhatchee River Bridge	former SR 358
CR 359		CR 361A	CR 361	former SR 359
CR 359A	Slaughter Road	CR 359	US 19/27	former SR 359A
CR 359A	Gas Plant Road			former SR 359A
CR 359B	Osteen Road	US 98	CR 361B	former SR 359B
CR 361		SR 51	CR 361B	former SR 361 partly inventoried by FDOT as CR 1509 and CR 2130
CR 361A		Spring Warrior Creek	US 19-98-ALT 27 @ US 221	former SR 361A
CR 361B	Woods Creek Road	CR 356 / CR 359	CR 361	former SR 361B
CR 361C	Morgan Whiddon Road	CR 361		former SR 361C
CR 362	Houck Road; Industrial Park Drive	CR 359	US 19-98-ALT 27	former SR 362
