= Pimple Hill =

Hill in Pennsylvania, United States of America

Coordinates: 41.028718°N 75.504122°W

Pimple Hill is a summit in Monroe County, Pennsylvania, United States, with an elevation of 2,198 feet (670 m).

A surveyors' station of the United States Coast and Geodetic Survey was located atop Pimple Hill.
