= Pimple Creek =

River in the United States of America

Coordinates: 30°6′55″N 83°35′40″W

Pimple Creek is a stream in Taylor County, Florida, in the United States.

Pimple Creek formed a boundary of Perry, Florida when Perry was incorporated in 1905. and it is still around. And has flooded the Roadway on one occasion

== See also ==
- List of rivers of Florida
