= Econfina River State Park =

Florida state park

- IUCN category V (protected landscape/seascape)
- Location within Florida Location within the United States
- Interactive map of Econfina River State Park
- Location: Taylor County, Florida, USA
- Nearest city: Lamont, Florida
- Coordinates: 30°03′36″N 83°54′22″W
- Area: 3,377 acres (13.67 km^{2})
- Governing body: Florida Department of Environmental Protection

Econfina River State Park is a Florida State Park, covering 3,377 acres (14 km^{2}) located on the Gulf of Mexico at the mouth of the Econfina River. The address is 4384 Econfina River Road, Lamont, Florida, United States.

== Ecology ==
The park contains 2,000 ha (5,000 acres) pine flatwoods, oak/palm forests, and broad expanses of salt marsh dotted with pine islands.

== Recreational Activities ==
The park has such amenities as birding, boating, canoeing, fishing, hiking, horse trails, kayaking and picnicking areas. Concessions are also available.

== Admission and Hours ==
There is a small entrance charge. Florida state parks are open between 8 a.m. and sundown every day of the year (including holidays).

== Gallery ==
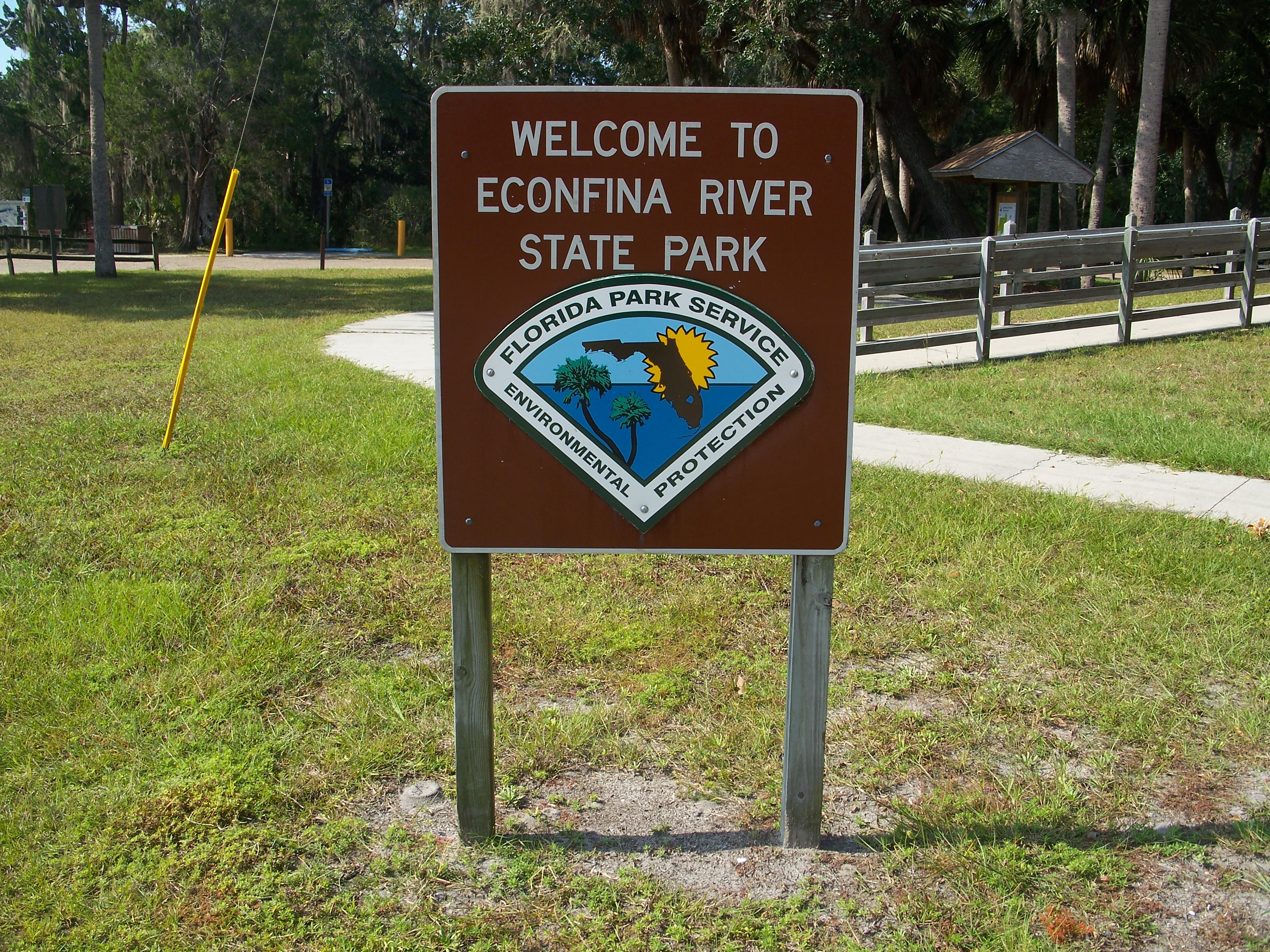

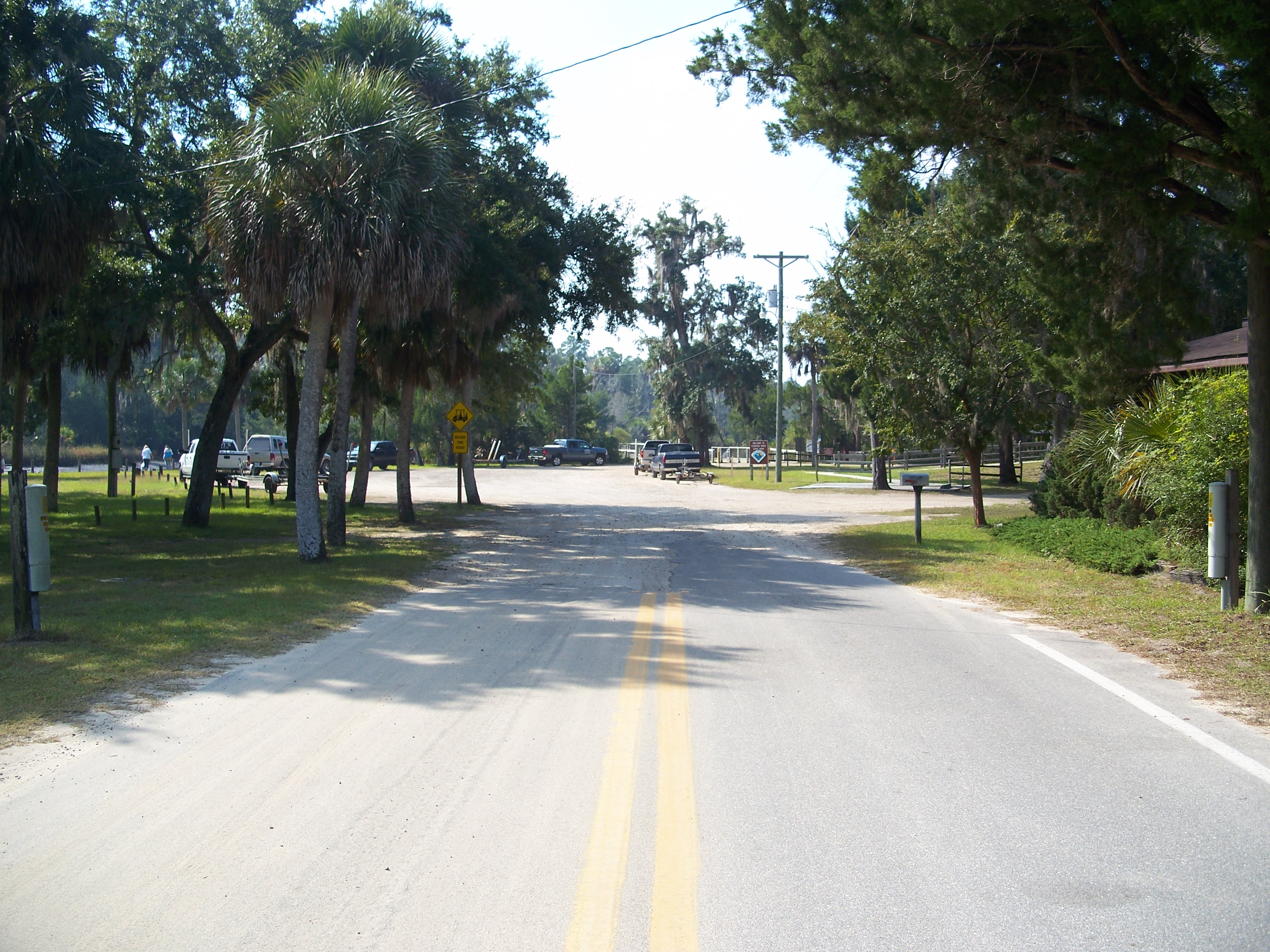

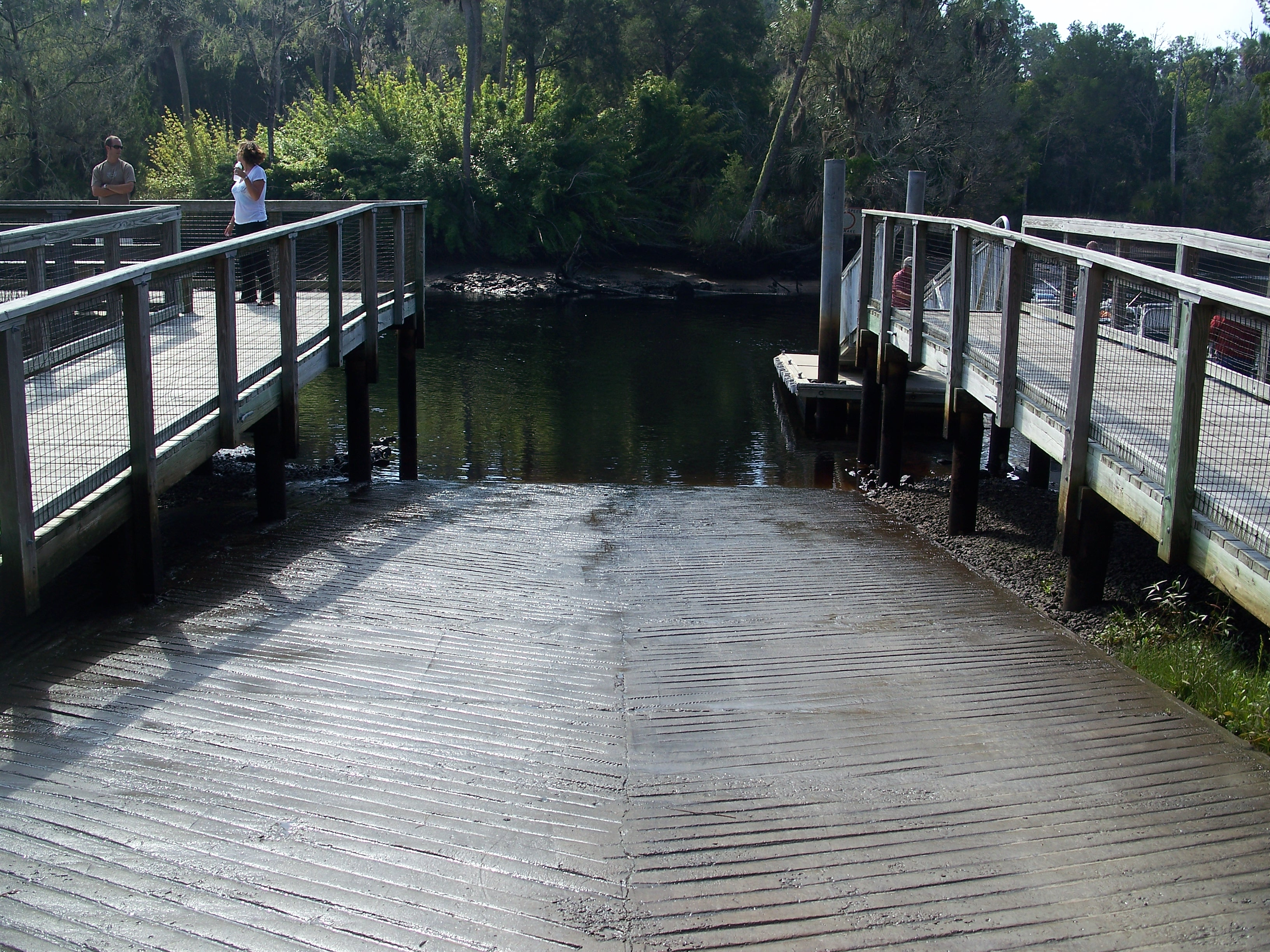

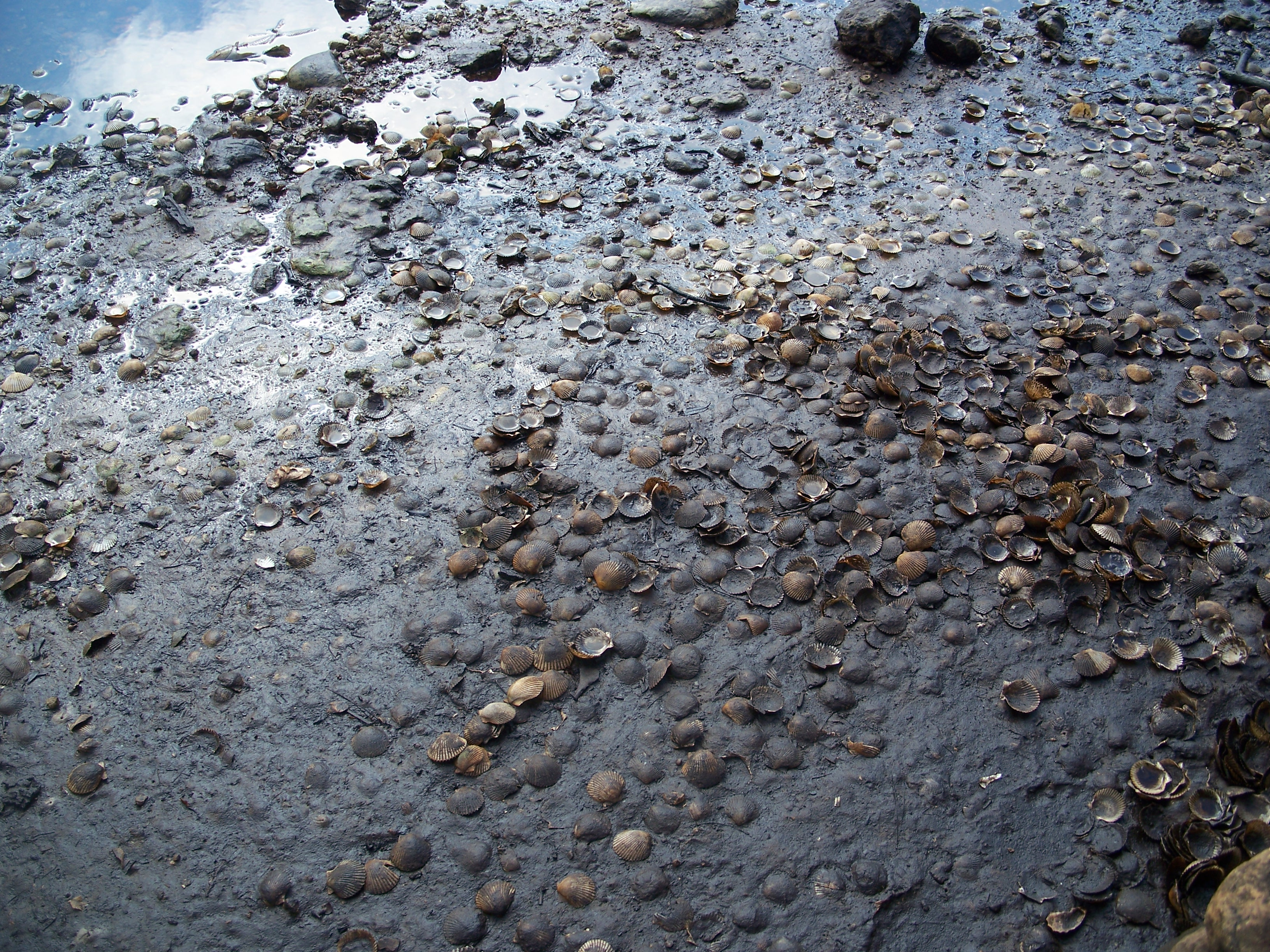
