= Crystal River Airport =

Airport in Florida, U.S.

Crystal River Airport Captain Tom Davis Field
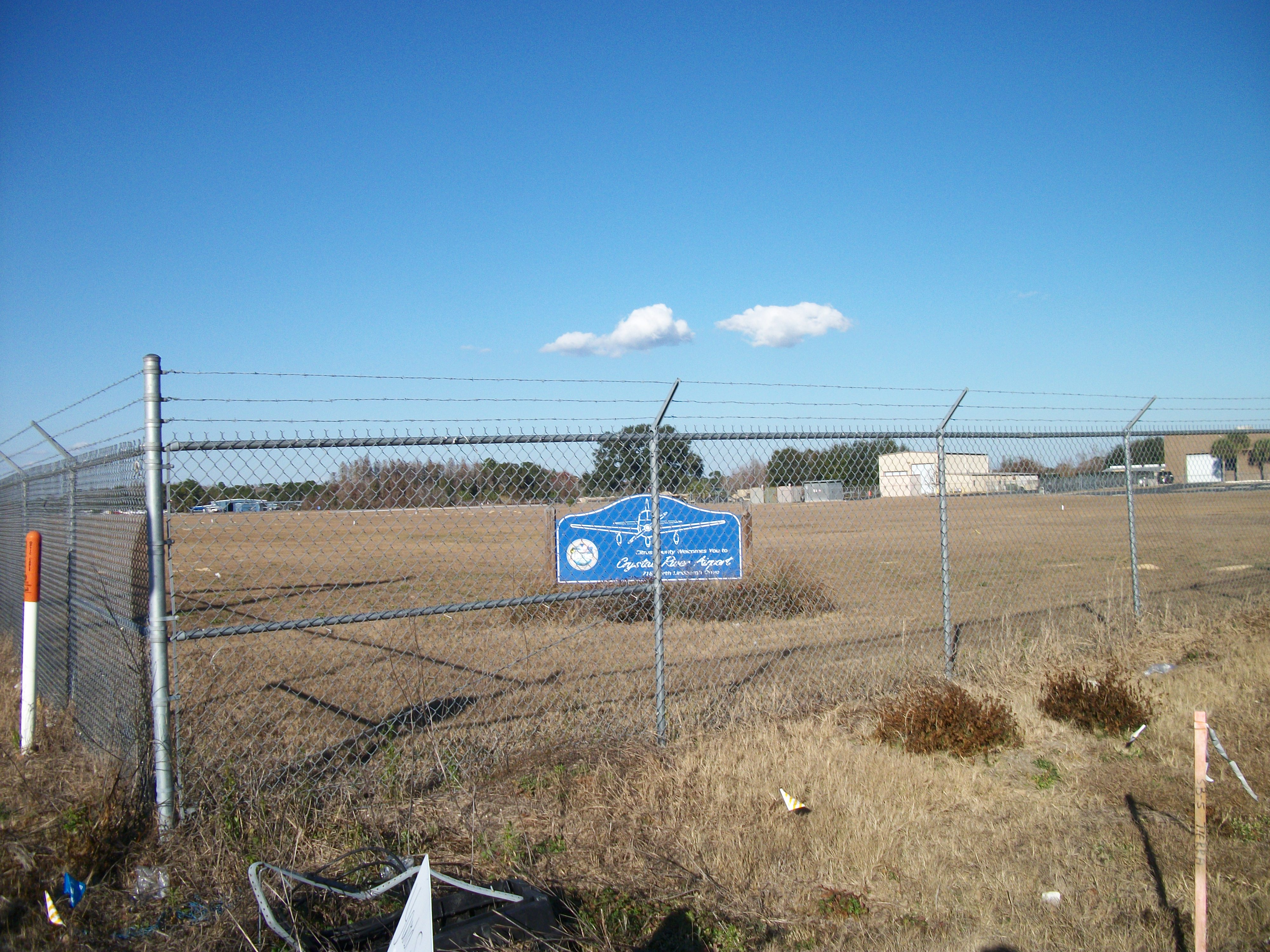
- IATA: none; ICAO: KCGC; FAA LID: CGC

Summary
- Airport type: Public
- Owner: Citrus County
- Operator: Crystal Aero Group
- Serves: Crystal River, Florida, U.S.
- Elevation AMSL: 9 ft (2.7 m)
- Coordinates: 28°52′02″N 082°34′17″W
- Interactive map of Crystal River Airport

Runways
| Direction | Length | | Surface |
| Direction | ft | m | Surface |
|---|---|---|---|
| 9/27 | 4,555 | 1,388 | Asphalt |
| 18/36 | 3,020 | 920 | Turf |

Statistics (2002)
- Aircraft operations: 36,600
- Based aircraft: 50
- Source: Federal Aviation Administration

Crystal River Airport – Captain Tom Davis Field (ICAO: KCGC, FAA LID: CGC) is a public airport located three miles (5 km) southeast of the central business district of Crystal River, in Citrus County, Florida, United States. It is owned by Citrus County.

This airport is assigned a three-letter location identifier of CGC by the Federal Aviation Administration, but it does not have an International Air Transport Association (IATA) airport code (the IATA assigned CGC to Cape Gloucester Airport in Papua New Guinea).

== History ==
In December 2013, the Citrus County Board of County Commissioners passed a resolution modifying the airport's name to Crystal River Airport – Captain Tom Davis Field. CAPT Tom Davis, USN (Ret), was an accomplished Naval Aviator out of the Navy's jet fighter community and a recipient of the Legion of Merit and the Distinguished Flying Cross.

Retiring from the Navy in 1978 following 33 years of service, CAPT Davis settled in Crystal River, starting a flight school at the airport that eventually became the facility's fixed-base operator (FBO). CAPT Davis also volunteered to become the airport manager and oversaw numerous capital improvements, including the addition of the airport's 4,555 foot paved runway.

By 2014 CAPT Davis had logged over 24,000 military and civilian flight hours, was an FAA Designated Pilot Examiner, and received the FAA Master Pilot Award. CAPT Davis died on December 15, 2022 at the age of 95.

== Facilities and aircraft ==
Crystal River Airport – Captain Tom Davis Field covers an area of 100 acres (40 ha) which contains two runways: 9/27 with an asphalt surface measuring 4,555 x 75 ft (1,388 x 23 m) and 18/36 with a turf surface measuring 3,020 x 100 ft (920 x 30 m).

For the 12-month period ending May 9, 2002, the airport had 36,600 aircraft operations, an average of 100 per day: 98% general aviation, 1% air taxi, and 1% military. There are 50 aircraft based at this airport: 86% single engine and 10% multi-engine airplanes, 2% helicopter and 2% glider.

A non-aviation Florida Army National Guard facility is located at the airport which periodically hosts visiting Florida Army National Guard aircraft from other FLARNG installations.

== See also ==
- List of airports in Florida
