= Eugene, Florida =

- Unincorporated community
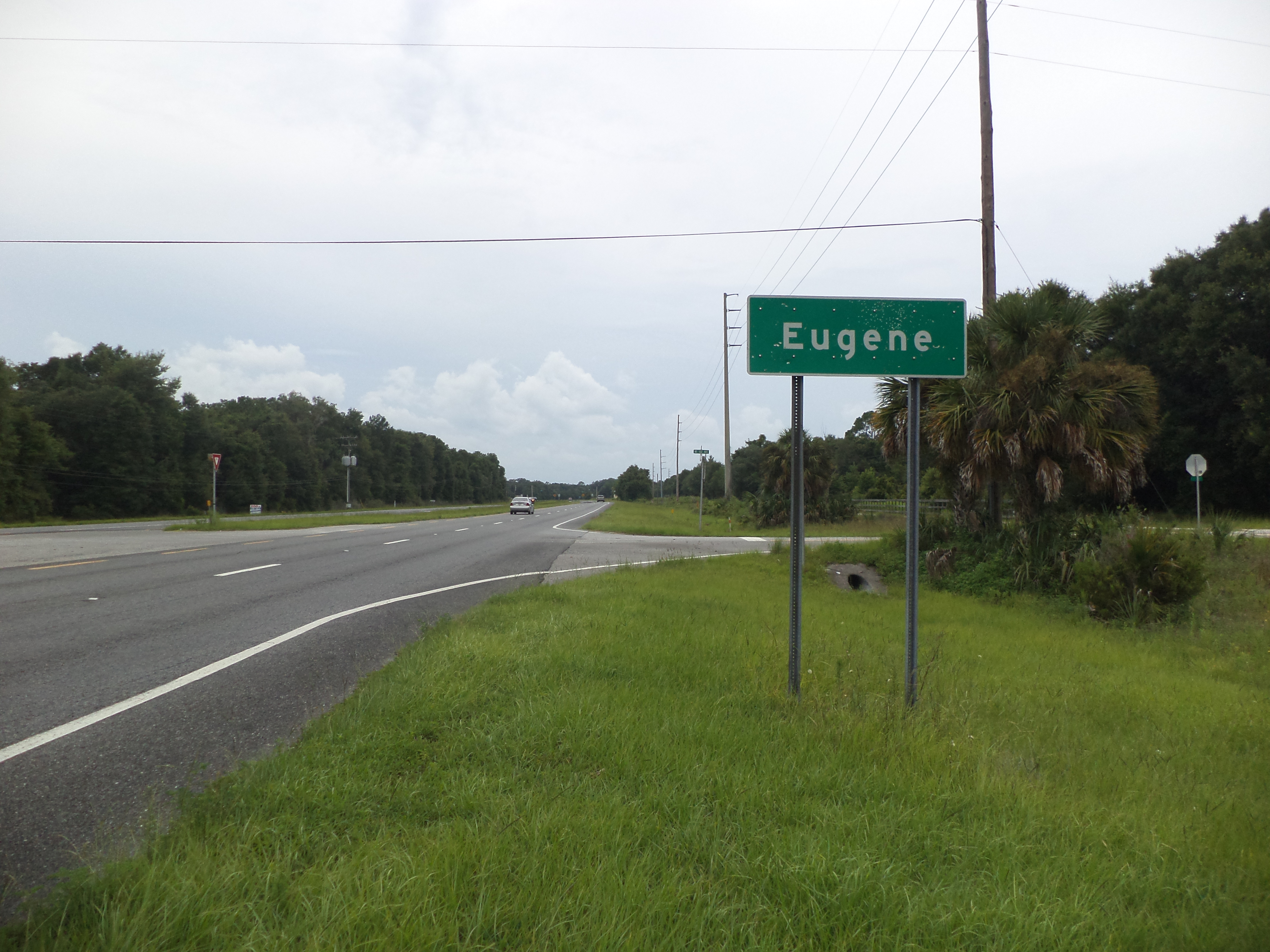
- Sign along US 19-98 and ALT US 27 as they enter Eugene.

- Location within Florida
- Coordinates: 29°36′42″N 83°05′16″W
- Country: United States
- State: Florida
- County: Dixie
- Elevation: 39 ft (12 m)
- Time zone: UTC-5 (Eastern (EST))
  - Summer (DST): UTC-4 (EDT)
- Area code: 352
- GNIS feature ID: 294758

Eugene is an unincorporated area in Dixie County, Florida. The Florida State Road Department rendered Eugene on a 1936 road map. A 1967 state geology report noted Pamlico Dune near Eugene on U.S. Highway 27. Eugene is south of Cross City and North of Old Town, Florida on U.S. Route 98 in Florida. The Nature Coast State Trail also passes by.

== Notable person ==
- Howell Lancaster (1911–1972), member of the Florida House of Representatives, and former leader of the Pork Chop Gang
