= Foley, Florida =

- Unincorporated area
- Location within Florida Location within the United States
- Coordinates: 30°4′9.77″N 83°31′50.53″W
- Country: United States
- State: Florida
- County: Taylor
- Time zone: UTC-5 (Eastern (EST))
  - Summer (DST): UTC-4 (EDT)
- ZIP codes: 32348
- GNIS feature ID: 282642

Foley is an unincorporated area in Taylor County, Florida, United States. It is located about 5 mi (8.05 km) southeast of Perry. The area is named after Jerry S. Foley, who founded it as a company town for the Brooks-Scanlon Lumber Company.

== History ==
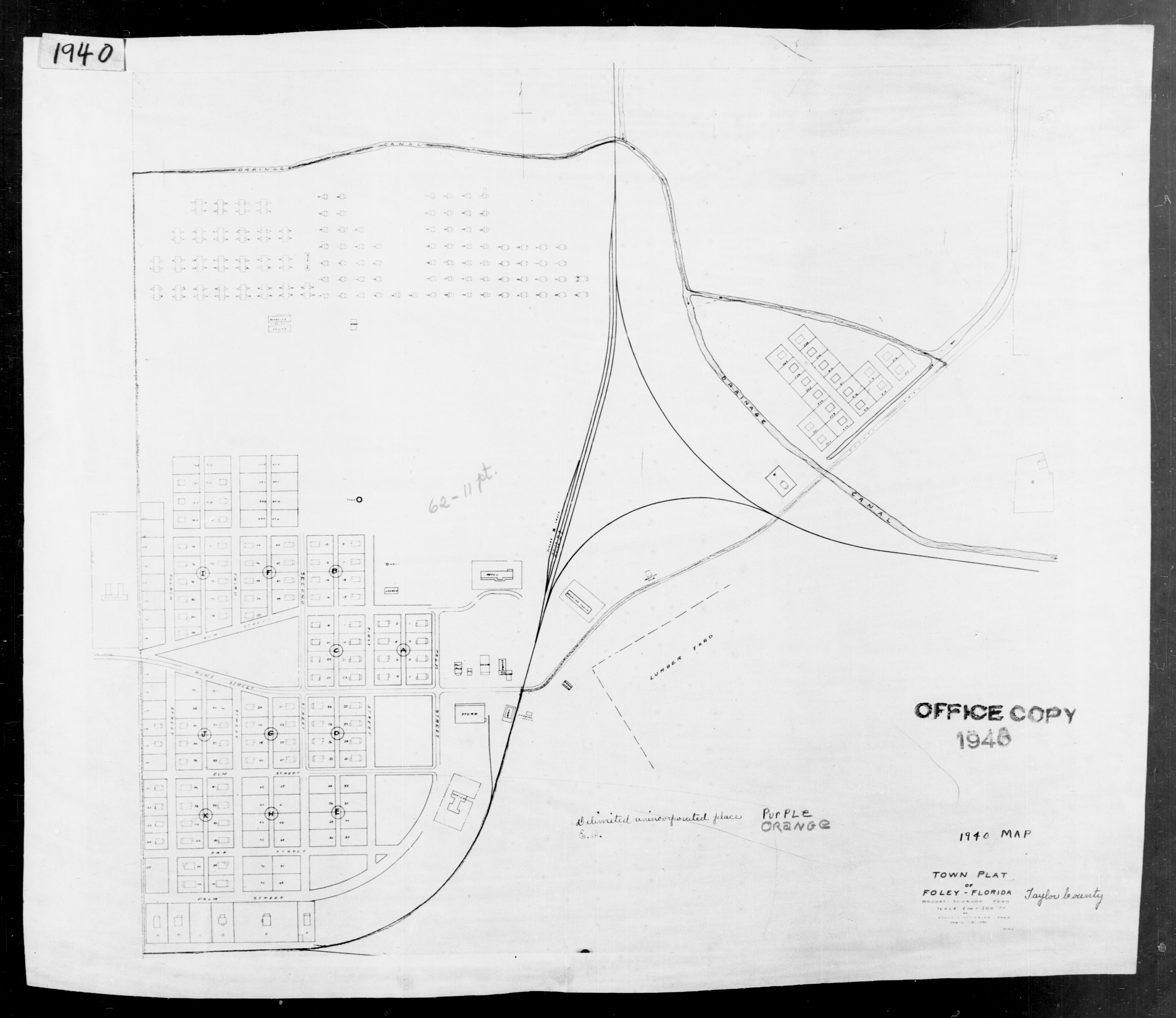
Town plat of Foley, Florida (1940)

In 1929, Brooks-Scanlon relocated to this section of Taylor County from their sawmill in Eastport, near Jacksonville. In doing so, the company planned to establish a town for its workers in the process. The town would consist of all the standard institutions, including a school, church, and post office, which opened in 1929 but was discontinued in 1964. There was also a theater, which burned down in 1936.

Foley Lumber Industries Inc. was established in 1951 and purchased the Brooks-Scanlon lumber plant that same year. At this time there were 600 homes available to workers at Foley. The industrial site would later be home to a branch of the Buckeye Cellulose Corporation, a subsidiary of Procter & Gamble. It is now occupied by Georgia Pacific, which acquired Buckeye in 2013.
