= Taylor County, Florida =

County in Florida, United States

- County
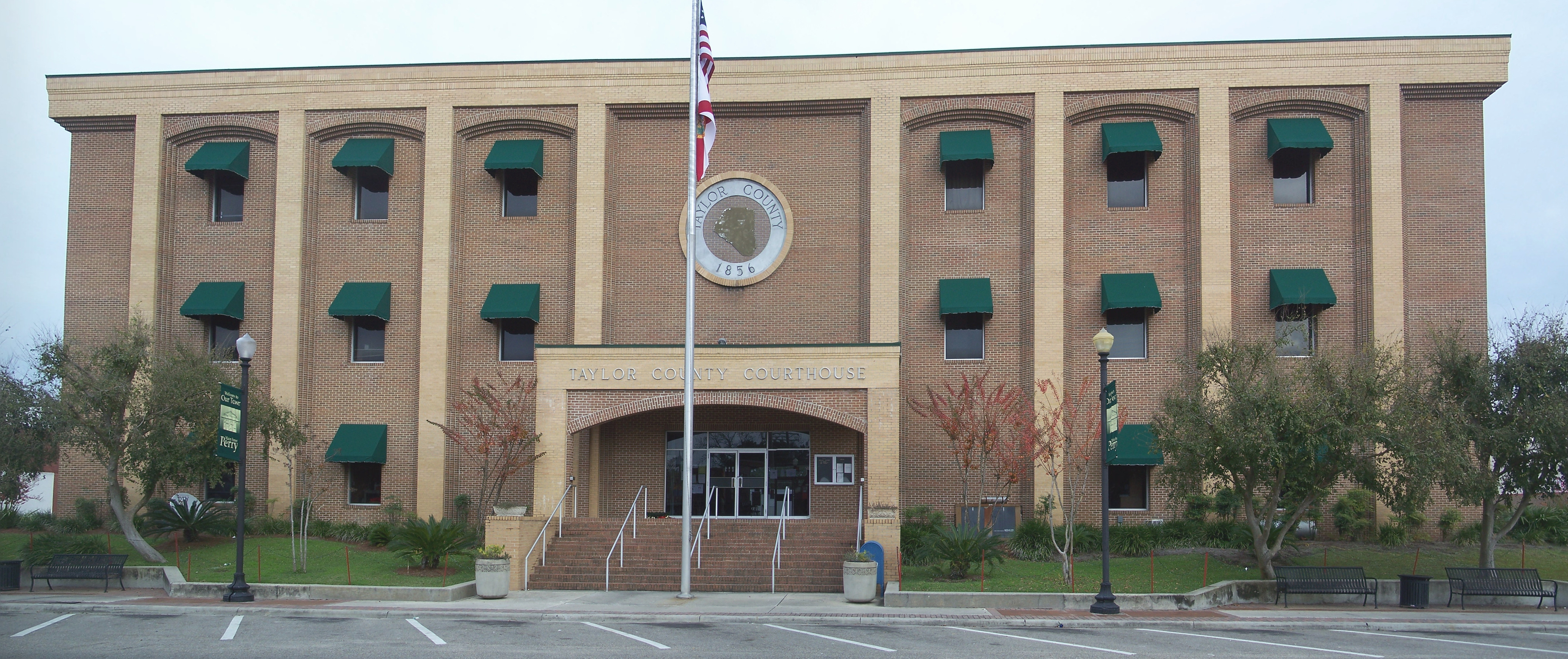
- Taylor County Courthouse

- Seal

- Location within the U.S. state of Florida
- Coordinates: 30°01′N 83°37′W
- Country: United States
- State: Florida
- Founded: December 23, 1856
- Named for: Zachary Taylor
- Seat: Perry
- Largest city: Perry

Area
  - Total: 1,232 sq mi (3,190 km^{2})
  - Land: 1,043 sq mi (2,700 km^{2})
  - Water: 189 sq mi (490 km^{2}) 15.3%

Population (2020)
  - Total: 21,796
  - Estimate (2025): 21,210 ▼
  - Density: 20.90/sq mi (8.069/km^{2})
- Time zone: UTC−5 (Eastern)
  - Summer (DST): UTC−4 (EDT)
- Congressional district: 2nd
- Website: www.taylorcountygov.com

Taylor County is a county located in the Big Bend region in the northern part of the U.S. state of Florida. As of the 2020 census, the population was 21,796. Its county seat is Perry. The county hosts the annual Florida Forest Festival and has been long known as the "Tree Capital of the South" since a 1965 designation from then-Governor W. Haydon Burns.

== History ==
Taylor County was created on December 23, 1856, from Madison County on the same day as Lafayette County was also split off from Madison County. It was named for Zachary Taylor, twelfth president of the United States, who served from 1849 to 1850. Taylor won most counties in northern Florida during the election of 1848 and was largely responsible for the ultimate U.S. victory in the Second Seminole War.

During the American Civil War, Taylor County was home to William Strickland and his band of deserters and Unionists called "The Royal Rangers" or the "Independent Rangers". In 1864, a Confederate colonel tasked with hunting down deserters, broke into Strickland's home and found a membership list of 35 men who "bear true allegiance to the United States of America." Despite their names being identified and homes burned to the ground, few members of the Rangers surrendered.

== Geography ==
According to the U.S. Census Bureau, the county has a total area of 1,232 square miles (3,190 km^{2}), of which 1,043 square miles (2,700 km^{2}) is land and 189 square miles (490 km^{2}) (15.3%) is water.

=== Adjacent counties ===
- Jefferson County, Florida - northwest
- Madison County, Florida - north
- Lafayette County, Florida - east
- Dixie County, Florida - southeast

=== National protected area ===
- St. Marks National Wildlife Refuge (part)

== Demographics ==
Historical population
Census	Pop.	Note	%±
1860	1,384		—
1870	1,453		5.0%
1880	2,279		56.8%
1890	2,122		−6.9%
1900	3,999		88.5%
1910	7,103		77.6%
1920	11,219		57.9%
1930	13,136		17.1%
1940	11,565		−12.0%
1950	10,416		−9.9%
1960	13,168		26.4%
1970	13,641		3.6%
1980	16,532		21.2%
1990	17,111		3.5%
2000	19,256		12.5%
2010	22,570		17.2%
2020	21,796		−3.4%
2025 (est.)	21,210	▼	−2.7%
U.S. Decennial Census; 1790-1960 1900-1990; 1990-2000 2010-2019

=== 2020 census ===
As of the 2020 census, the county had a population of 21,796, 8,138 households, and 5,197 families. The median age was 43.7 years; 19.8% of residents were under the age of 18 and 20.9% were 65 years of age or older. For every 100 females there were 121.2 males, and for every 100 females age 18 and over there were 125.1 males.

Of those households, 27.7% had children under the age of 18 living in them. Of all households, 42.7% were married-couple households, 21.2% were households with a male householder and no spouse or partner present, and 29.0% were households with a female householder and no spouse or partner present. About 30.0% of all households were made up of individuals and 15.8% had someone living alone who was 65 years of age or older.

The racial makeup of the county was 73.6% White, 19.3% Black or African American, 0.5% American Indian and Alaska Native, 1.0% Asian, <0.1% Native Hawaiian and Pacific Islander, 1.3% from some other race, and 4.2% from two or more races. Hispanic or Latino residents of any race comprised 4.0% of the population.

30.0% of residents lived in urban areas, while 70.0% lived in rural areas.

There were 11,088 housing units, of which 26.6% were vacant. Among occupied housing units, 75.9% were owner-occupied and 24.1% were renter-occupied. The homeowner vacancy rate was 2.6% and the rental vacancy rate was 11.6%.

=== Racial and ethnic composition ===
Taylor County, Florida – Racial and ethnic composition Note: the US Census treats Hispanic/Latino as an ethnic category. This table excludes Latinos from the racial categories and assigns them to a separate category. Hispanics/Latinos may be of any race.
Race / Ethnicity (NH = Non-Hispanic)	Pop 1980	Pop 1990	Pop 2000	Pop 2010	Pop 2020	% 1980	% 1990	% 2000	% 2010	% 2020
White alone (NH)	12,758	13,682	14,817	16,483	15,629	77.17%	79.96%	76.95%	73.03%	71.71%
Black or African American alone (NH)	3,497	3,068	3,640	4,629	4,196	21.15%	17.93%	18.90%	20.51%	19.25%
Native American or Alaska Native alone (NH)	108	153	175	171	102	0.65%	0.89%	0.91%	0.76%	0.47%
Asian alone (NH)	30	34	85	149	224	0.18%	0.20%	0.44%	0.66%	1.03%
Native Hawaiian or Pacific Islander alone (NH)	x	x	2	5	0	x	x	0.01%	0.02%	0.00%
Other race alone (NH)	5	0	11	15	45	0.03%	0.00%	0.06%	0.07%	0.21%
Mixed race or Multiracial (NH)	x	x	231	341	734	x	x	1.20%	1.51%	3.37%
Hispanic or Latino (any race)	134	174	295	777	866	0.81%	1.02%	1.53%	3.44%	3.97%
Total	16,532	17,111	19,256	22,570	21,796	100.00%	100.00%	100.00%	100.00%	100.00%

=== 2000 census ===
As of the census of 2000, there were 19,256 people, 7,176 households, and 5,130 families residing in the county. The population density was 18 people per square mile (6.9 people/km^{2}). There were 9,646 housing units at an average density of 9 per square mile (3.5/km^{2}). The racial makeup of the county was 77.84% White, 19.04% Black or African American, 0.98% Native American, 0.44% Asian, 0.02% Pacific Islander, 0.32% from other races, and 1.38% from two or more races. 1.53% of the population were Hispanic or Latino of any race.

There were 7,176 households, out of which 31.60% had children under the age of 18 living with them, 52.50% were married couples living together, 14.40% had a female householder with no husband present, and 28.50% were non-families. 24.20% of all households were made up of individuals, and 10.60% had someone living alone who was 65 years of age or older. The average household size was 2.51 and the average family size was 2.95.

In the county, the population was spread out, with 24.60% under the age of 18, 8.20% from 18 to 24, 28.30% from 25 to 44, 24.80% from 45 to 64, and 14.10% who were 65 years of age or older. The median age was 38 years. For every 100 females there were 104.40 males. For every 100 females age 18 and over, there were 104.80 males.

The median income for a household in the county was $30,032, and the median income for a family was $35,061. Males had a median income of $27,967 versus $19,054 for females. The per capita income for the county was $15,281. About 14.50% of families and 18.00% of the population were below the poverty line, including 22.20% of those under age 18 and 17.90% of those age 65 or over.

In March 2016, the county's unemployment rate was 5.6%.

== Education ==
Students are served by the Taylor County School System. For the 2006 - 2007 school year the Florida Department of Education gave the District a "B" grade with three of its schools earning an "A" and one school earning a "B" grade.

Taylor County High School also has an Army JROTC unit which has been an Honor Unit with Distinction for 27 consecutive years.

== Library ==
The Taylor County Public Library is part of the Three Rivers Library System, which also serves Gilchrist, Lafayette, and Dixie counties.

== Communities ==
=== Town ===
- Perry

=== Census-designated place ===
- Steinhatchee

=== Other unincorporated communities ===
- Athena
- Bucell Junction
- Clara (shared with Dixie County)
- Dekle Beach
- Eridu
- Fenholloway
- Fish Creek
- Foley
- Hampton Springs
- Iddo
- Keaton Beach
- Lake Bird
- Pinland
- Salem
- Shady Grove
- Tennille

== Politics ==
Taylor County was a Democratic-leaning county until 1964, when Republican Barry Goldwater carried it. Democrats only carried the county three times since then, with the last being in 1996.

United States presidential election results for Taylor County, Florida
Year	Republican		Democratic		Third party(ies)	
Year	No.	%	No.	%	No.	%
1904	119	37.54%	168	53.00%	30	9.46%
1908	160	31.13%	250	48.64%	104	20.23%
1912	56	15.43%	236	65.01%	71	19.56%
1916	51	8.36%	547	89.67%	12	1.97%
1920	128	17.73%	563	77.98%	31	4.29%
1924	100	16.45%	476	78.29%	32	5.26%
1928	465	38.05%	739	60.47%	18	1.47%
1932	130	8.24%	1,447	91.76%	0	0.00%
1936	127	6.27%	1,897	93.73%	0	0.00%
1940	198	7.34%	2,499	92.66%	0	0.00%
1944	165	8.28%	1,828	91.72%	0	0.00%
1948	216	10.81%	1,354	67.73%	429	21.46%
1952	744	29.40%	1,787	70.60%	0	0.00%
1956	776	28.52%	1,945	71.48%	0	0.00%
1960	1,212	38.85%	1,908	61.15%	0	0.00%
1964	2,661	60.91%	1,708	39.09%	0	0.00%
1968	794	15.71%	941	18.62%	3,318	65.66%
1972	4,109	84.50%	754	15.50%	0	0.00%
1976	1,983	36.68%	3,370	62.34%	53	0.98%
1980	2,776	47.31%	2,963	50.49%	129	2.20%
1984	4,038	69.98%	1,732	30.02%	0	0.00%
1988	4,057	69.06%	1,763	30.01%	55	0.94%
1992	2,693	37.34%	2,568	35.60%	1,952	27.06%
1996	3,188	39.86%	3,583	44.80%	1,226	15.33%
2000	4,058	59.59%	2,649	38.90%	103	1.51%
2004	5,467	63.71%	3,049	35.53%	65	0.76%
2008	6,457	68.79%	2,803	29.86%	127	1.35%
2012	6,249	68.37%	2,764	30.24%	127	1.39%
2016	6,930	74.13%	2,152	23.02%	266	2.85%
2020	7,751	76.45%	2,299	22.68%	88	0.87%
2024	7,954	79.37%	1,991	19.87%	77	0.77%

== Transportation ==
=== Airports ===
- Perry–Foley Airport

=== Major highways ===
- US 19 is the main south-to-north route in Taylor County. It enters the county from Dixie County across a pair of bridges over the Tennille River east of Tennille, being overlapped with US 98 and Alternate US 27 until the routes encounter US 27 in Perry. From that point, US 98 turns west to run along the south coast of the Florida Panhandle and US 27 joins US 19 in an overlap through the Madison County Line.
- US 27 runs southeast to northwest from Lafayette County and joins US 19 in Perry at the north end of the US 19/98 overlap. From there it runs north along US 19 on its way to Capps.
- US 27 Alt. is a bannered alternate of US 27 that runs northwest and southeast from US 27 at the US 19/98 overlap in Perry to US 19/US 98 in Chiefland, where it branches off onto its own route to Williston.
- US 98 begins as a west-to-east route in the county, but once it intersects US 19 in Perry it joins that road and becomes a north-to-south route.
- US 221 is an auxiliary route of US 21 that runs north from Perry, and then passes through in Shady Grove just before crossing the Madison County line on its way through Greenville before heading north into Georgia.
- SR 51 begins in Steinhatchee on the Gulf of Mexico running along the west bank of the Steinhatchee River. After intersecting with US 19/98/Alt. 27 in Tennille, it crosses the Dixie County Line.

=== Railroads ===
- Taylor County's current surviving railway is the Georgia and Florida Railway. Past railroads in the county have included the Perry Cutoff of the Atlantic Coast Line Railroad and the Live Oak, Perry and South Georgia Railway, both of which are now abandoned.

== See also ==
- National Register of Historic Places listings in Taylor County, Florida
