= T. C. Merchant Jr. =

American politician

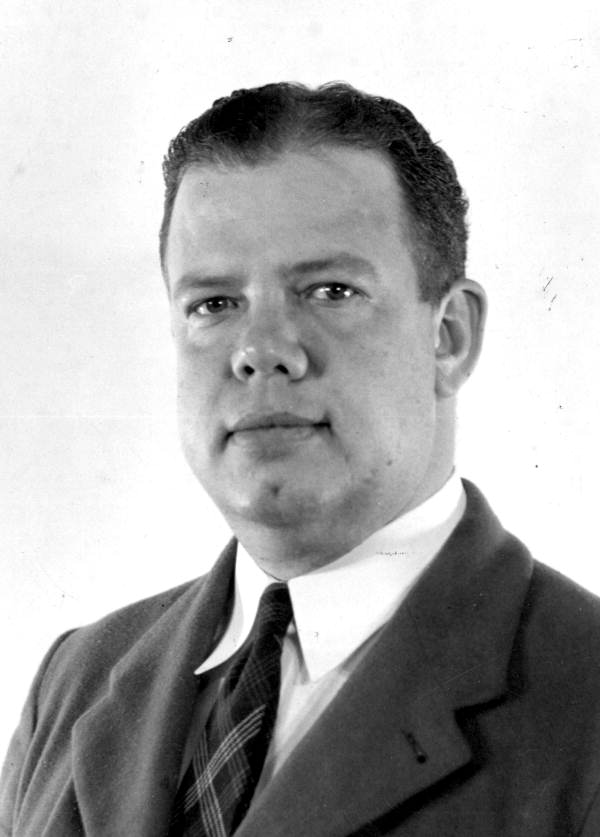
- Merchant in 1949

Member of the Florida House of Representatives from Madison County
- In office 1949–1951

Personal details
- Born: April 2, 1916 Madison, Florida, U.S.
- Died: December 5, 2012 (aged 96)
- Party: Democratic
- Parent: T. C. Merchant Sr. (father)
- Education: University of Florida; Harvard Business School

T. C. Merchant Jr. (April 2, 1916 – December 5, 2012) was an American politician. He served as a Democratic member of the Florida House of Representatives.

== Life and career ==
Merchant was born in Madison, Florida. He attended the University of Florida and Harvard Business School.

Merchant served in the Florida House of Representatives from 1949 to 1951.

Merchant died on December 5, 2012, at the age of 96.
