= Greenville, Florida =

Town in the state of Florida, United States

- Town
- Town of Greenville
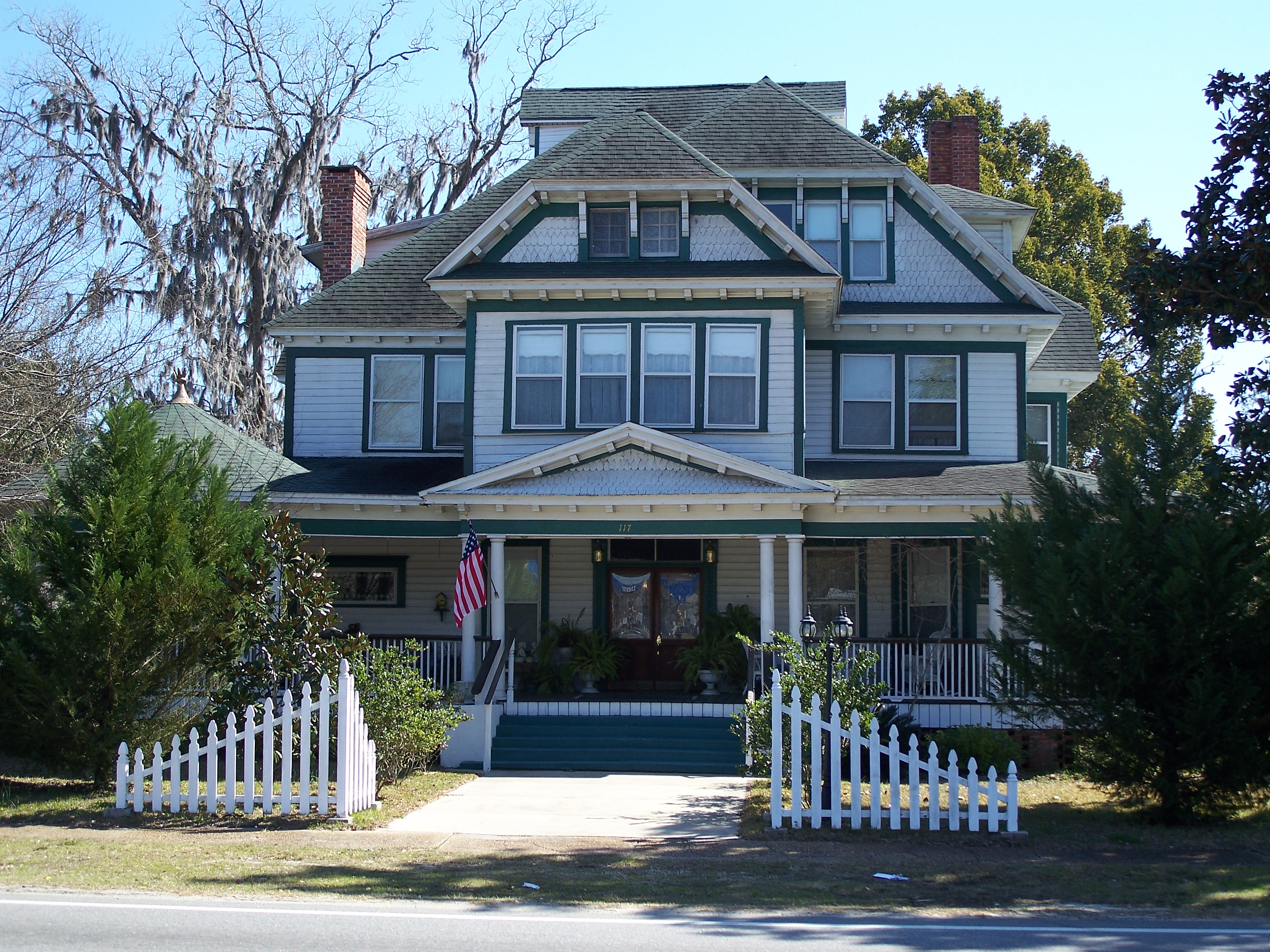
- Historic Bishop-Andrews Hotel

- Seal

- Location in Madison County and the state of Florida
- Coordinates: 30°27′59″N 83°37′48″W
- Country: United States
- State: Florida
- County: Madison
- Settled (Sandy Ford): 1850
- Settled (Station Five): 1861–1865
- Incorporated (Town of Greenville): 1907
- Named after: Greenville, North Carolina

Government
  - Type: Council-Manager
  - Mayor: Ryan Kornegay
  - Vice Mayor: Carl Livingston
  - Councilors: Barbara Dansey, Kathleen Hamilton, and Chiquila Pleas
  - Town Manager: Dr. Victoria K. Kingston
  - Town Clerk: Kimberly "Kim" M. Reams

Area
  - Total: 1.32 sq mi (3.41 km^{2})
  - Land: 1.32 sq mi (3.41 km^{2})
  - Water: 0 sq mi (0.00 km^{2})
- Elevation: 135 ft (41 m)

Population (2020)
  - Total: 746
  - Density: 566.6/sq mi (218.78/km^{2})
- Time zone: UTC-5 (Eastern (EST))
  - Summer (DST): UTC-4 (EDT)
- ZIP code: 32331
- Area code(s): 850, 448
- FIPS code: 12-27575
- GNIS feature ID: 2406616
- Website: mygreenvillefl.com

Greenville is a town in Madison County, Florida, United States. The population was 746 at the 2020 census, down from 843 at the 2010 census.

== History ==
Greenville was first settled in 1850. It was originally known as "Sandy Ford", and during the American Civil War it was renamed "Station Five" for its location along the Pensacola and Georgia Railroad. It was officially incorporated in 1907, and named the "Town of Greenville" because during the US civil war, the women's sewing circle in the community helped sew for Confederate soldiers and after the civil war, the postmaster and residents decided to name it after the birthplace of Mrs. U.M. Roberts, the sewing circle's president: Greenville, North Carolina. Ray Charles lived with his mother in Greenville. There is a statue of him in Greenville Park.

== Geography ==
The approximate coordinates for the Town of Greenville is located in west central Madison County. U.S. Route 90 passes through the north side of the town, leading east 13 miles (21 km) to Madison, the county seat, and northwest 16 miles (26 km) to Monticello. U.S. Route 221 passes through the center of town, leading south 26 miles (42 km) to Perry and north 24 miles (39 km) to Quitman, Georgia. Interstate 10 passes 2 miles (3 km) south of the town, with access to US-221 at Exit 241. I-10 leads west 41 miles (66 km) to Tallahassee, the state capital, and east 63 miles (101 km) to Lake City.

According to the United States Census Bureau, the town of Greenville has a total area of 1.3 square miles (3.4 km^{2}), all land.

== Climate ==
The climate in this area is characterized by hot, humid summers and generally mild winters. According to the Köppen climate classification, the Town of Greenville has a humid subtropical climate zone (Cfa).

== Demographics ==
Historical population
Census	Pop.	Note	%±
1910	751		—
1920	668		−11.1%
1930	904		35.3%
1940	1,114		23.2%
1950	1,163		4.4%
1960	1,318		13.3%
1970	1,141		−13.4%
1980	1,096		−3.9%
1990	950		−13.3%
2000	837		−11.9%
2010	843		0.7%
2020	746		−11.5%
U.S. Decennial Census

=== Racial and ethnic composition ===
Greenville town, Florida – Racial and ethnic composition Note: the US Census treats Hispanic/Latino as an ethnic category. This table excludes Latinos from the racial categories and assigns them to a separate category. Hispanics/Latinos may be of any race.
Race / Ethnicity (NH = Non-Hispanic)	Pop 2000	Pop 2010	Pop 2020	% 2000	% 2010	% 2020
White alone (NH)	228	219	217	27.24%	25.98%	29.09%
Black or African American alone (NH)	603	595	480	72.04%	70.58%	64.34%
Native American or Alaska Native alone (NH)	1	1	3	0.12%	0.12%	0.40%
Asian alone (NH)	1	1	2	0.12%	0.12%	0.27%
Native Hawaiian or Pacific Islander alone (NH)	0	0	0	0.00%	0.00%	0.00%
Other race alone (NH)	0	0	2	0.00%	0.00%	0.27%
Mixed race or Multiracial (NH)	2	15	23	0.24%	1.78%	3.08%
Hispanic or Latino (any race)	2	12	19	0.24%	1.42%	2.55%
Total	837	843	746	100.00%	100.00%	100.00%

=== 2020 census ===
As of the 2020 United States census, there were 746 people, 378 households, and 218 families residing in the town.

=== 2010 census ===
As of the 2010 United States census, there were 843 people, 369 households, and 273 families residing in the town.

=== 2000 census ===
As of the census of 2000, there were 837 people, 331 households, and 220 families residing in the town. The population density was 636.9 inhabitants per square mile (245.9/km^{2}). There were 394 housing units at an average density of 299.8 per square mile (115.8/km^{2}). The racial makeup of the town was 27.36% White, 72.04% African American, 0.12% Native American, 0.12% Asian, 0.12% from other races, and 0.24% from two or more races. Hispanic or Latino of any race were 0.24% of the population.

In 2000, there were 331 households, out of which 33.8% had children under the age of 18 living with them, 33.8% were married couples living together, 27.5% had a female householder with no husband present, and 33.5% were non-families. 31.4% of all households were made up of individuals, and 16.9% had someone living alone who was 65 years of age or older. The average household size was 2.53 and the average family size was 3.16.

In 2000, in the town, the population was spread out, with 31.3% under the age of 18, 7.2% from 18 to 24, 24.4% from 25 to 44, 19.0% from 45 to 64, and 18.2% who were 65 years of age or older. The median age was 35 years. For every 100 females, there were 83.2 males. For every 100 females age 18 and over, there were 70.1 males.

In 2000, the median income for a household in the town was $20,060, and the median income for a family was $21,484. Males had a median income of $23,750 versus $17,368 for females. The per capita income for the town was $11,128. About 26.4% of families and 32.9% of the population were below the poverty line, including 48.5% of those under age 18 and 25.7% of those age 65 or over.

== Education ==
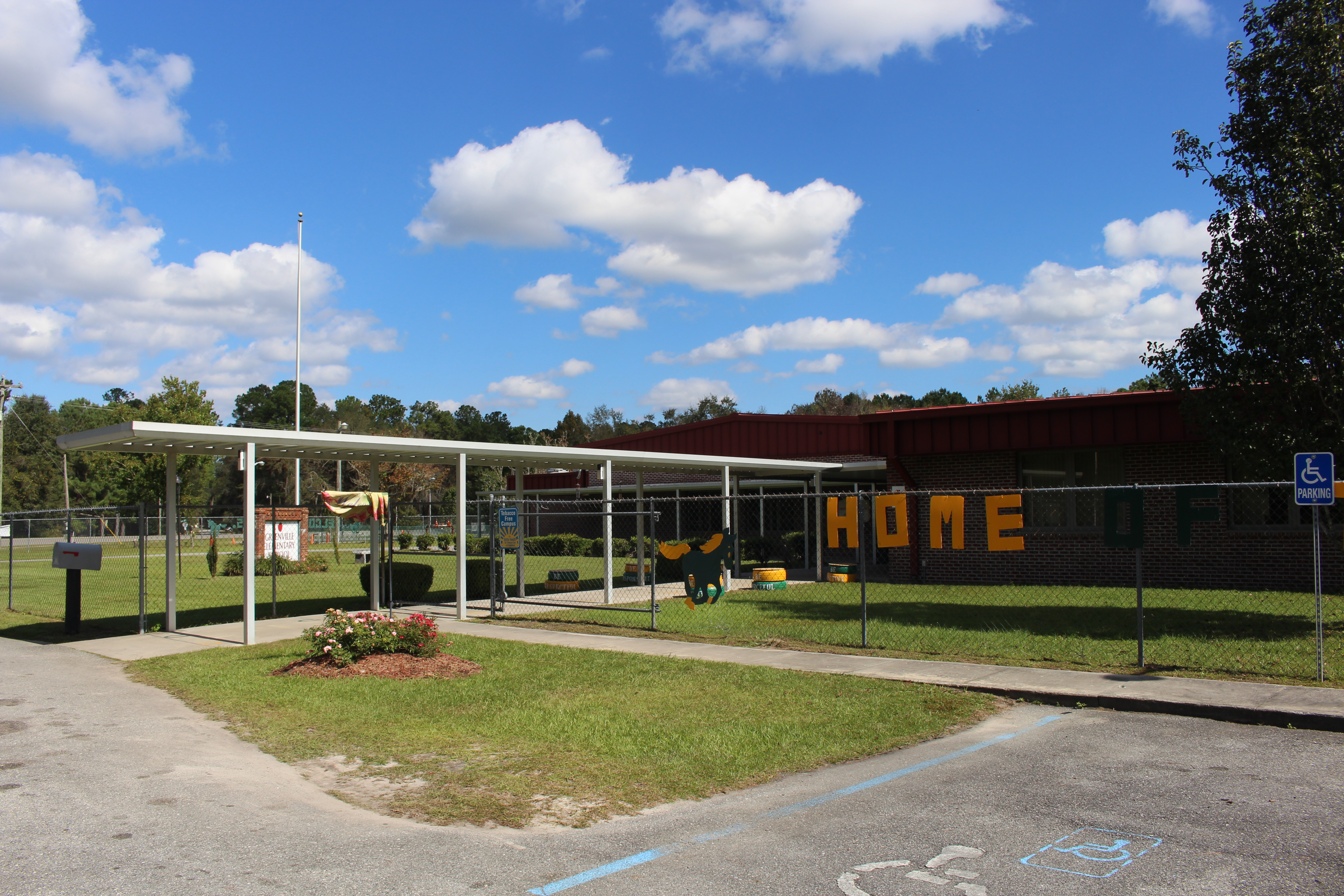
Greenville Elementary School

Greenville Elementary School is a part of the District School Board of Madison County. Secondary school students go to the PreK–8 Madison County Central School, which serves Greenville students for middle school, and Madison County High School.

The Suwanee River Regional Library System operates the Greenville Library.

== Notable people ==
- Ray Charles, childhood home of R&B icon
- Geno Hayes, former NFL linebacker for various teams
- Chris Thompson, former NFL running back for various teams
