= Lee, Florida =

Town in the state of Florida, United States

- Town
- Town of Lee
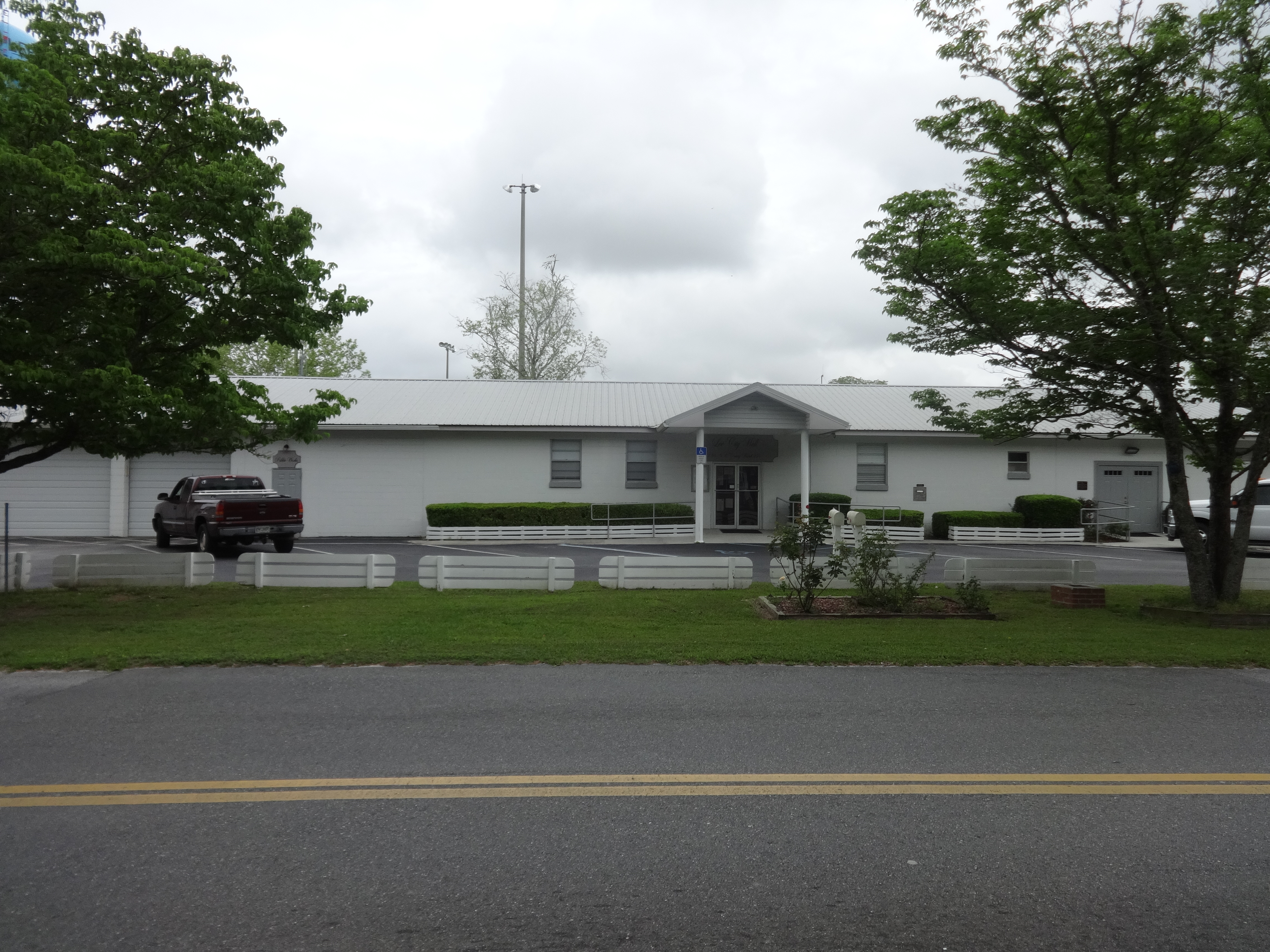
- Lee Town Hall

- Seal
- Motto: "Little but Proud"
- Location in Madison County and the state of Florida
- Coordinates: 30°24′42″N 83°18′01″W
- Country: United States
- State: Florida
- County: Madison
- Settled: c. 1890s
- Incorporated: 1909

Government
  - Type: Council-Manager
  - Mayor: James C. Ruzicka
  - Council President: Kenneth "Ken" Szostek
  - Councilors: Ronnie Bass, Cindy Thomas, Lloyd Burke, and Edwin McMullen
  - Town Manager and Town Clerk: Sona Hayslett
  - Town Attorney: Rhett Bullard

Area
  - Total: 2.44 sq mi (6.31 km^{2})
  - Land: 2.44 sq mi (6.31 km^{2})
  - Water: 0 sq mi (0.00 km^{2})
- Elevation: 89 ft (27 m)

Population (2020)
  - Total: 375
  - Density: 153.9/sq mi (59.44/km^{2})
- Time zone: UTC-5 (Eastern (EST))
  - Summer (DST): UTC-4 (EDT)
- ZIP code: 32059
- Area code(s): 850, 448
- FIPS code: 12-39850
- GNIS feature ID: 2405998
- Website: www.leeflorida.org

Lee is a town in Madison County, Florida, United States. The Town of Lee is part of the Florida Panhandle region in North Florida. The population was 375 at the 2020 census.

== Geography ==
The approximate coordinates for the Town of Lee is located in eastern Madison County on the Florida Panhandle in North Florida.

U.S. Route 90 passes through the north side of the town, leading northwest 8 miles (13 km) to Madison, the county seat, and southeast 21 miles (34 km) to Live Oak. Interstate 10 passes 3 miles (5 km) south of the town center, with access from Exit 262 (County Road 255).

According to the United States Census Bureau, the town has a total area of 2.4 square miles (6.2 km^{2}), all land.

== Climate ==
The climate in this area is characterized by hot, humid summers and generally mild winters. According to the Köppen climate classification, the Town of Lee has a humid subtropical climate zone (Cfa).

== Demographics ==
Historical population
Census	Pop.	Note	%±
1920	199		—
1930	185		−7.0%
1940	258		39.5%
1950	228		−11.6%
1960	243		6.6%
1970	240		−1.2%
1980	297		23.8%
1990	306		3.0%
2000	352		15.0%
2010	352		0.0%
2020	375		6.5%
U.S. Decennial Census

=== 2010 and 2020 census ===
Lee racial composition (Hispanics excluded from racial categories) (NH = Non-Hispanic)
Race	Pop 2010	Pop 2020	% 2010	% 2020
White (NH)	266	287	75.57%	76.53%
Black or African American (NH)	27	29	7.67%	7.73%
Native American or Alaska Native (NH)	2	3	0.57%	0.80%
Asian (NH)	3	5	0.85%	1.33%
Pacific Islander or Native Hawaiian (NH)	0	0	0.00%	0.00%
Some other race (NH)	0	2	0.00%	0.53%
Two or more races/Multiracial (NH)	8	23	2.27%	6.13%
Hispanic or Latino (any race)	46	26	13.07%	6.93%
Total	352	375		

As of the 2020 United States census, there were 375 people, 212 households, and 122 families residing in the town.

As of the 2010 United States census, there were 352 people, 176 households, and 156 families residing in the town.

=== 2000 census ===
At the 2000 census there were 352 people, 130 households, and 92 families in the town. The population density was 287.8 inhabitants per square mile (111.1/km^{2}). There were 154 housing units at an average density of 125.9 per square mile (48.6/km^{2}). The racial makeup of the town was 95.45% White, 2.84% African American, 0.28% Native American, 0.28% Asian, and 1.14% from two or more races. Hispanic or Latino of any race were 2.56%.

Of the 130 households in 2000, 34.6% had children under the age of 18 living with them, 52.3% were married couples living together, 16.2% had a female householder with no husband present, and 28.5% were non-families. 26.2% of households were one person and 12.3% were one person aged 65 or older. The average household size was 2.71 and the average family size was 3.13.

The age distribution in 2000 was 30.7% under the age of 18, 5.4% from 18 to 24, 28.7% from 25 to 44, 22.2% from 45 to 64, and 13.1% 65 or older. The median age was 37 years. For every 100 females, there were 96.6 males. For every 100 females age 18 and over, there were 101.7 males.

In 2000, the median household income was $26,250 and the median family income was $26,875. Males had a median income of $33,750 versus $21,875 for females. The per capita income for the town was $13,242. About 19.8% of families and 26.5% of the population were below the poverty line, including 46.2% of those under age 18 and 12.8% of those age 65 or over.

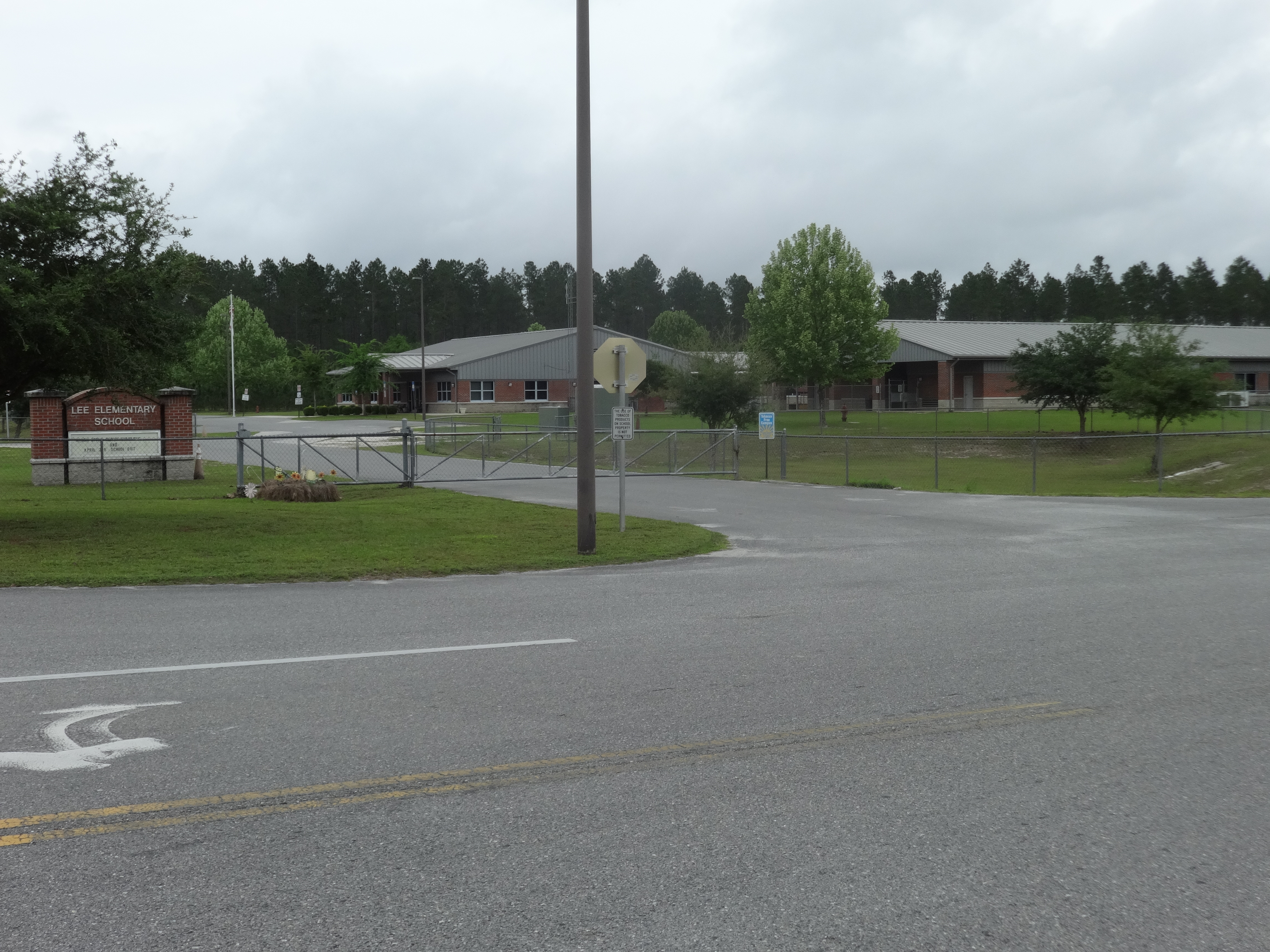
Lee Elementary School

== Education ==
All public schools are served by the District School Board of Madison County.

- Lee Elementary School (K-5)
- Madison County Central School (PreK-8), which serves pre-kindergarten and elementary school students to middle school (6–8) students
- Madison County High School

=== Library ===
The Suwanee River Regional Library System operates the Lee Library.
