= T. C. Merchant Sr. =

American politician

Member of the Florida House of Representatives from Madison County
- In office 1918–1919
- In office 1923
- In office 1929

Personal details
- Born: December 9, 1887
- Died: 1968 (aged 80–81)
- Party: Democratic
- Children: T. C. Merchant Jr.

T. C. Merchant Sr. (December 9, 1887 – 1968) was an American politician. He served as a Democratic member of the Florida House of Representatives.
