= Jacobbi McDaniel =

American football player (born 1989)

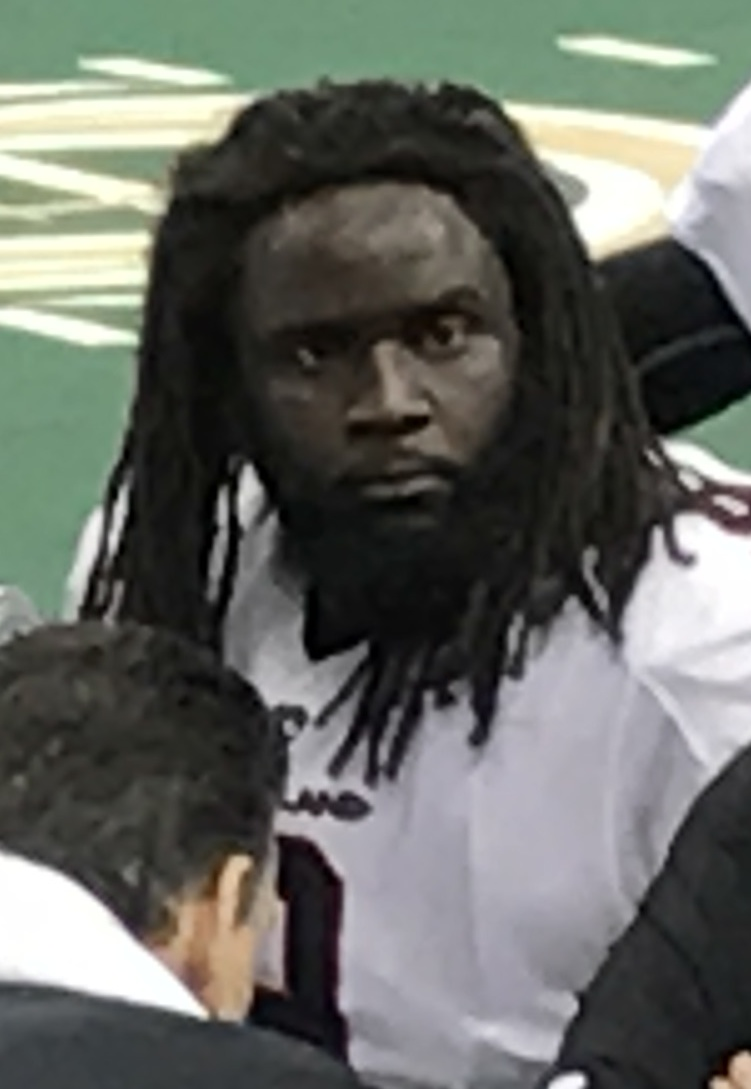
- McDaniel with the Cleveland Gladiators in 2017

No. 60, 9
- Position: Defensive tackle

Personal information
- Born: October 8, 1989 (age 37)
- Listed height: 6 ft 0 in (1.83 m)
- Listed weight: 293 lb (133 kg)

Career information
- High school: Madison County (Madison, Florida)
- College: Florida State (2009-2013)
- NFL draft: 2014: undrafted

Career history
- Cleveland Browns (2014); Cleveland Gladiators (2017)
- Stats at Pro Football Reference
- Stats at ArenaFan.com

Jacobbi McDaniel (born October 8, 1989) is an American former professional football defensive tackle who played for the Cleveland Browns of the National Football League (NFL). He played college football at Florida State University.

== Early life ==
McDaniel played high school football and baseball at Madison County High School in Madison, Florida. He earned first-team Big Bend honors in baseball as a junior and a senior, while also receiving first-team All-State accolades his senior year. He nearly won the Big Bend triple crown as a junior, hitting .589 with 13 home runs. McDaniel was named the 2008–09 Gatorade Player of the Year in football in the state of Florida, earning Big Bend first-team honors his senior year. He was honored as a USA Today and Under Armour All-American. He was drafted in the 33rd round by the Milwaukee Brewers in the 2009 MLB draft. McDaniel was listed as a third baseman in the Draft.

== College career ==
McDaniel was a member of the Florida State Seminoles football team from 2009 to 2013.

== Professional career ==
Pre-draft measurables
Height	Weight	Arm length	Hand span	40-yard dash	10-yard split	20-yard split	Vertical jump	Broad jump	Bench press
6 ft 0 5/8 in (1.84 m)	293 lb (133 kg)	31 3/8 in (0.80 m)	9 1/2 in (0.24 m)	5.02 s	1.73 s	2.90 s	30.5 in (0.77 m)	8 ft 9 in (2.67 m)	25 reps
All values from Florida State's Pro Day

McDaniel signed with the Cleveland Browns on May 19, 2014, after going undrafted in the 2014 NFL draft. He was released by the Browns on August 30, 2014, and signed to the team's practice squad on August 31, 2014. He was promoted to the active roster on October 18, 2014. McDaniel made his NFL debut on October 19, 2014, against the Jacksonville Jaguars. He was released by the Browns on October 20 and signed to the team's practice squad on October 22, 2014. He was waived by the Browns on November 11 and signed to the team's practice squad on November 18, 2014. McDaniel was released by the Browns on September 5, 2015.

McDaniel was assigned to the Cleveland Gladiators on January 9, 2017.
