= Madison County Schools (Florida) =

School district in Florida, United States

Madison County School District

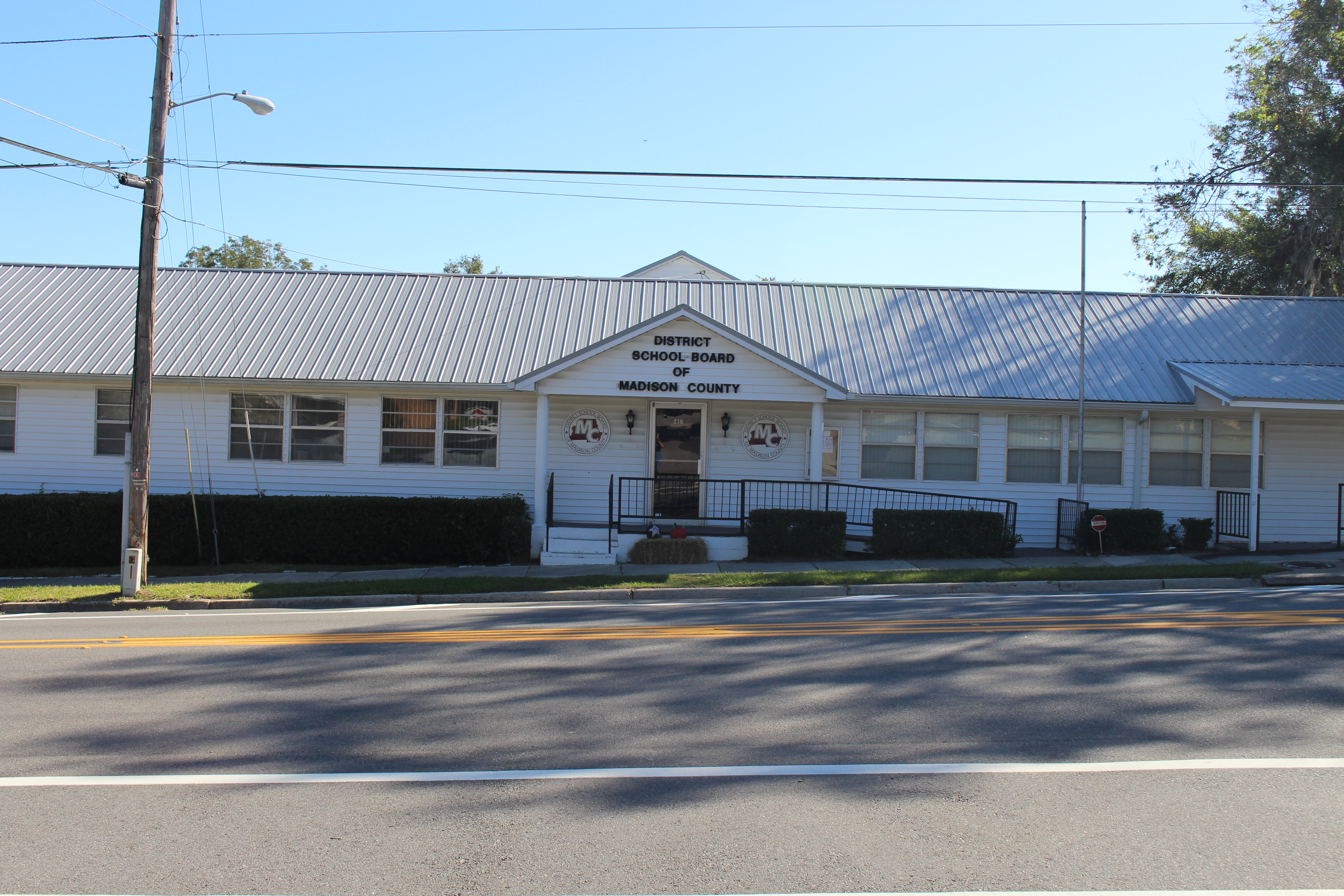
- Headquarters

Location
- Madison, FL United States of America

District information
- Type: Public
- Grades: Pre-K through 12
- Superintendent: Doug Brown

Other information
- Website: https://www.madison.k12.fl.us/

Madison County School District (MCSD) or Madison County Schools is a public school district (K-12) with its headquarters located in Madison, Florida.

It serves all of Madison County.

== Schools and facilities ==
High school:

- Madison County High School - unincorporated, west of Madison

PK-8 schools:

- Madison County Central School - unincorporated, west of Madison

Primary schools:

- Greenville Elementary School - Greenville
- Pinetta Elementary School - Pinetta
- Lee Elementary School - Lee
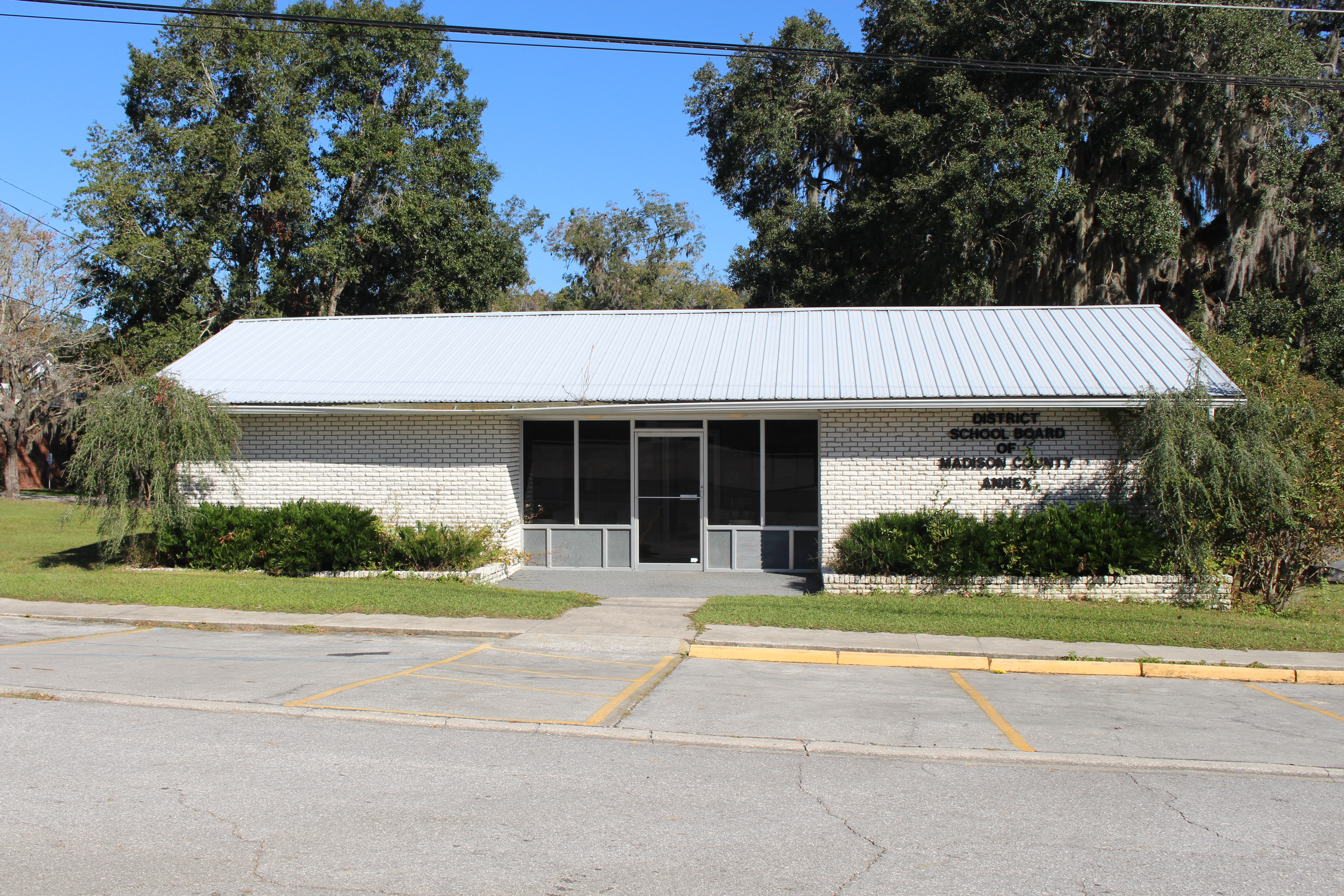
Headquarters Annex

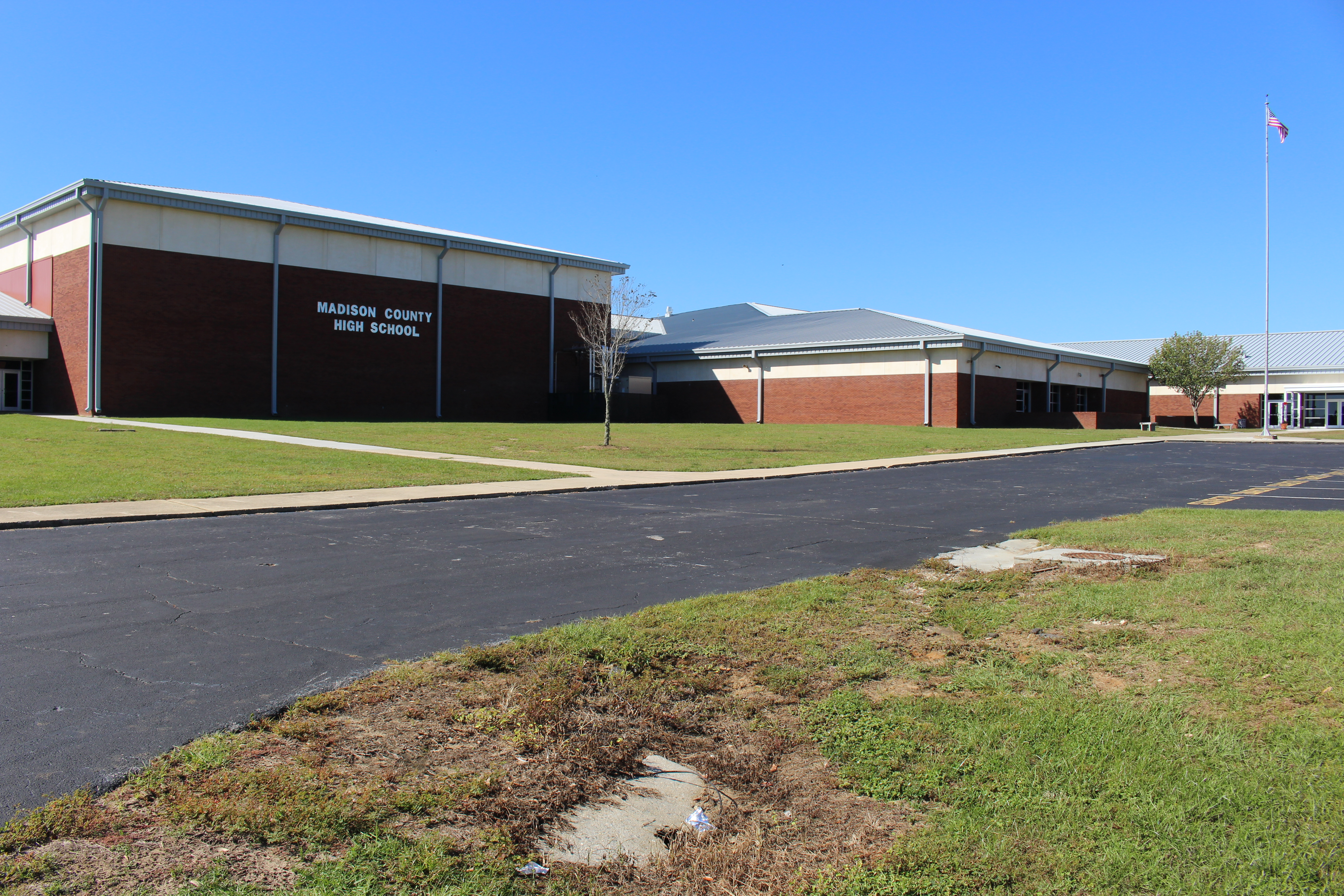
Madison County High School

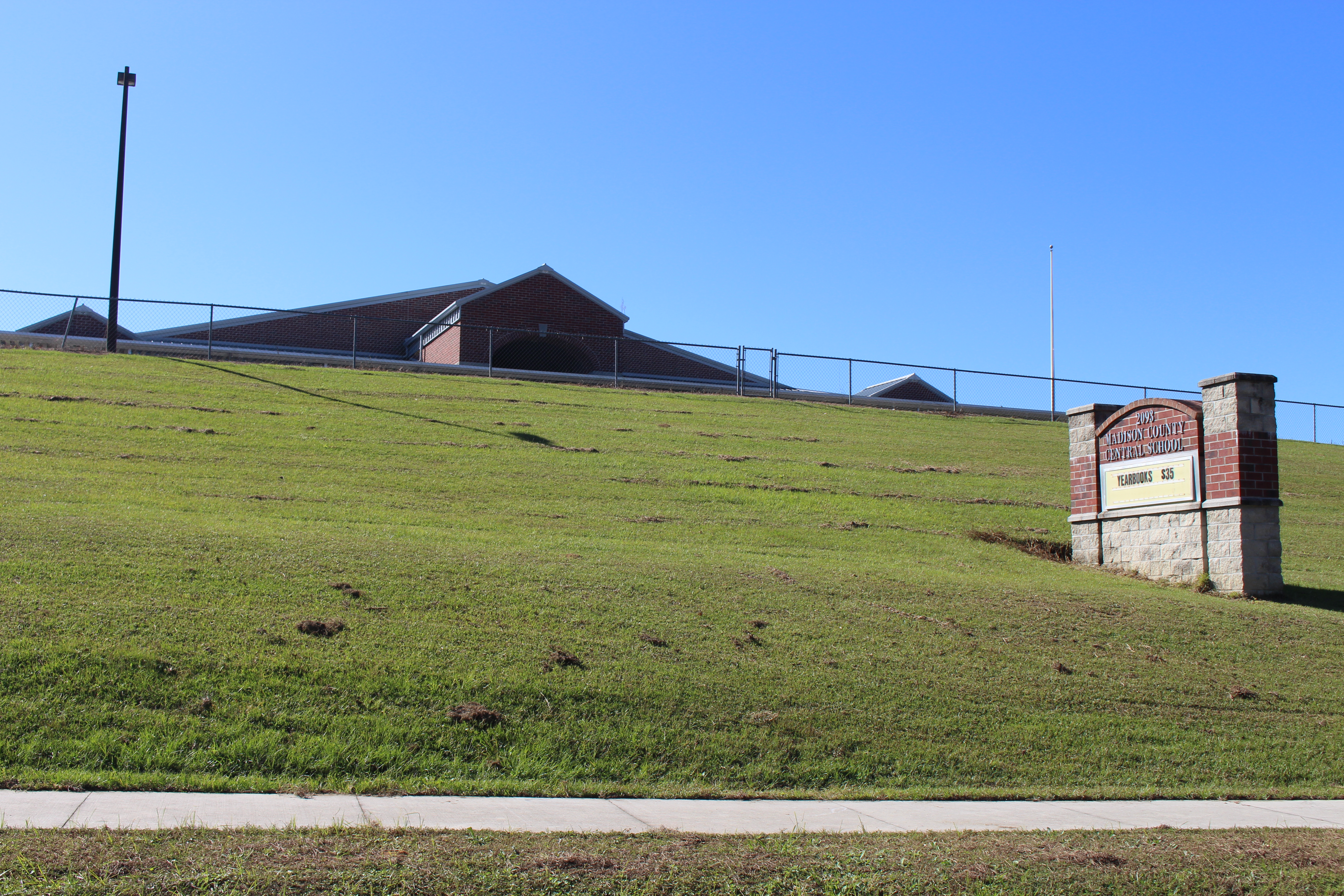
Madison County Central School

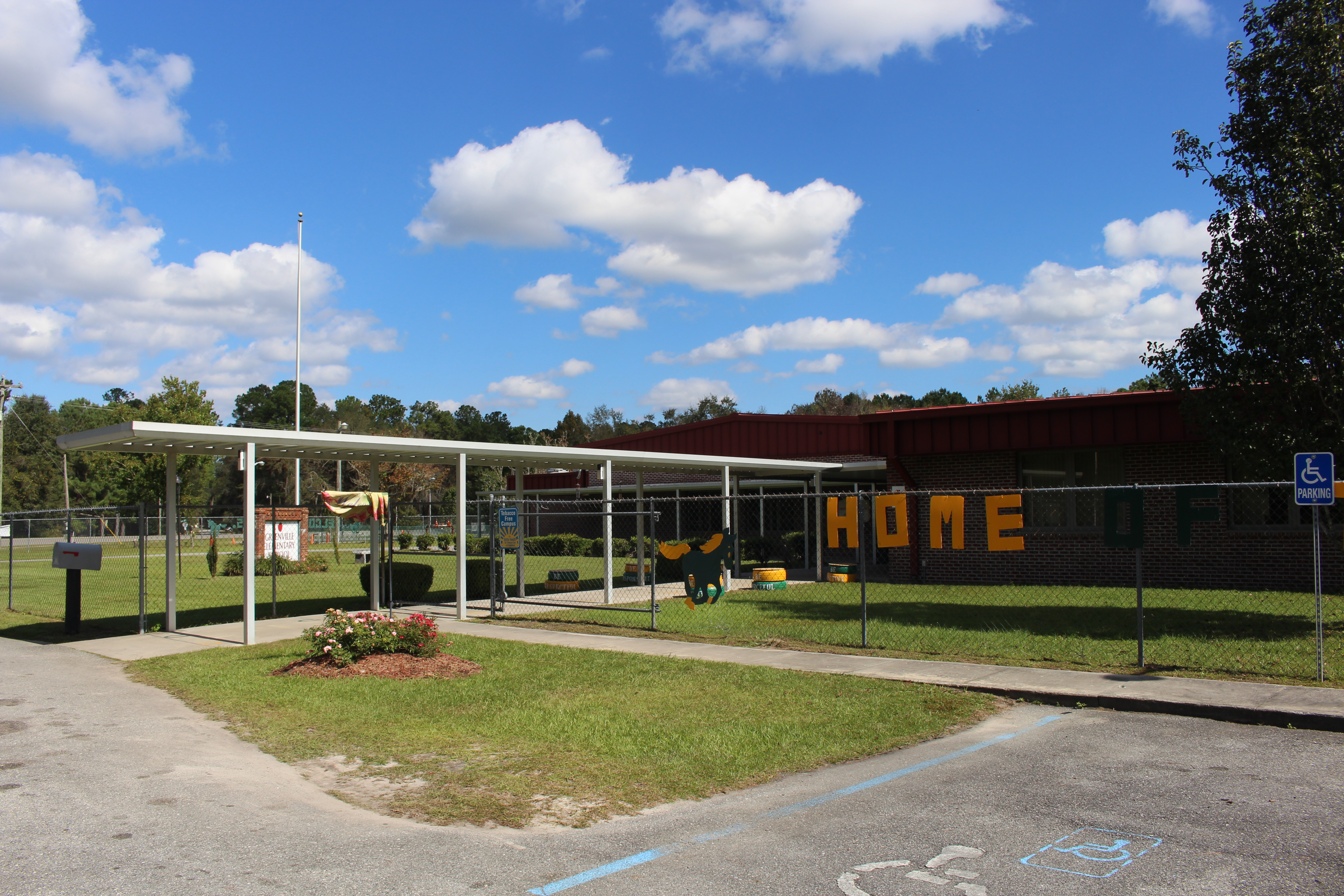
Greenville Elementary School

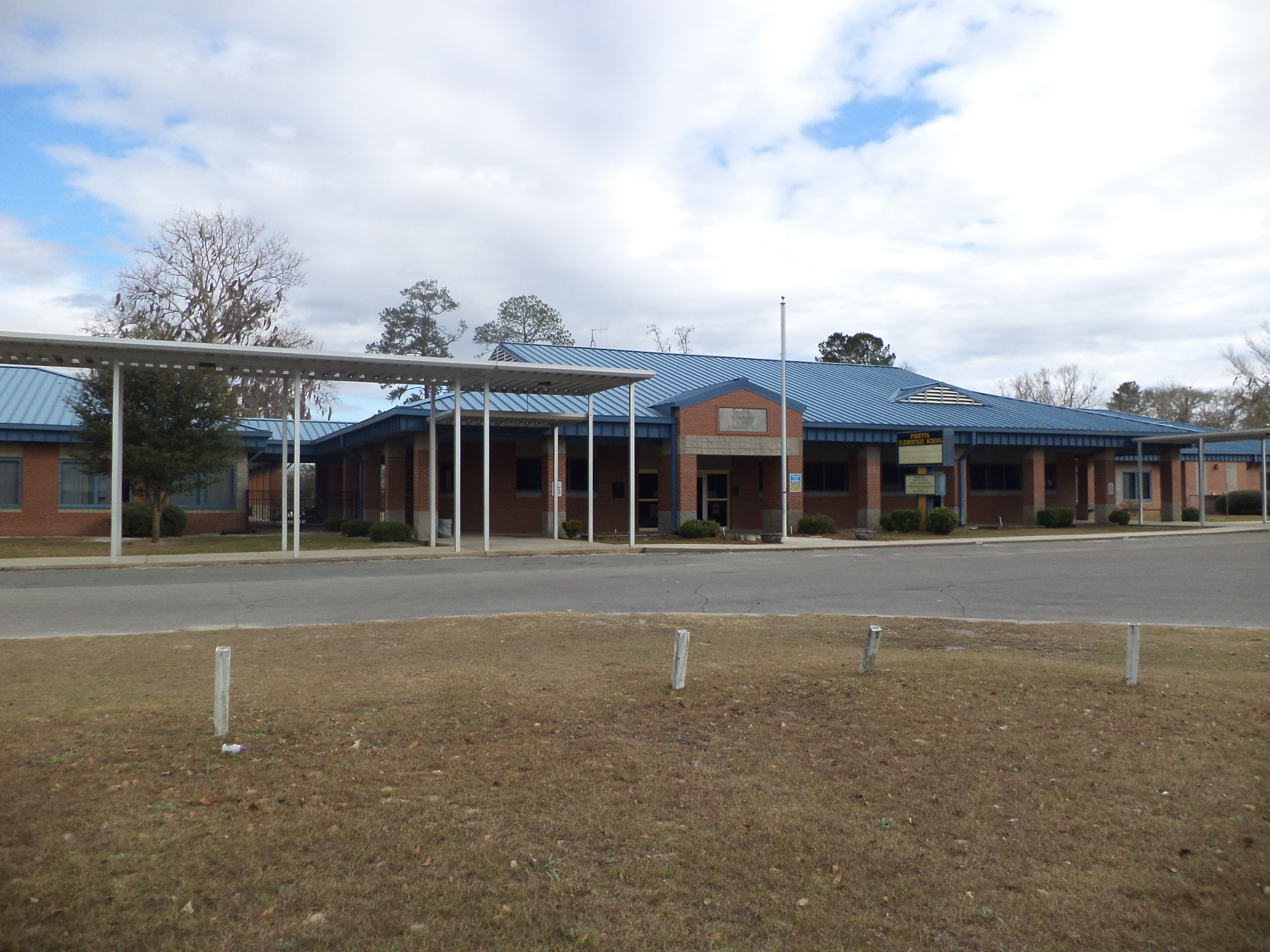
Pinetta Elementary School

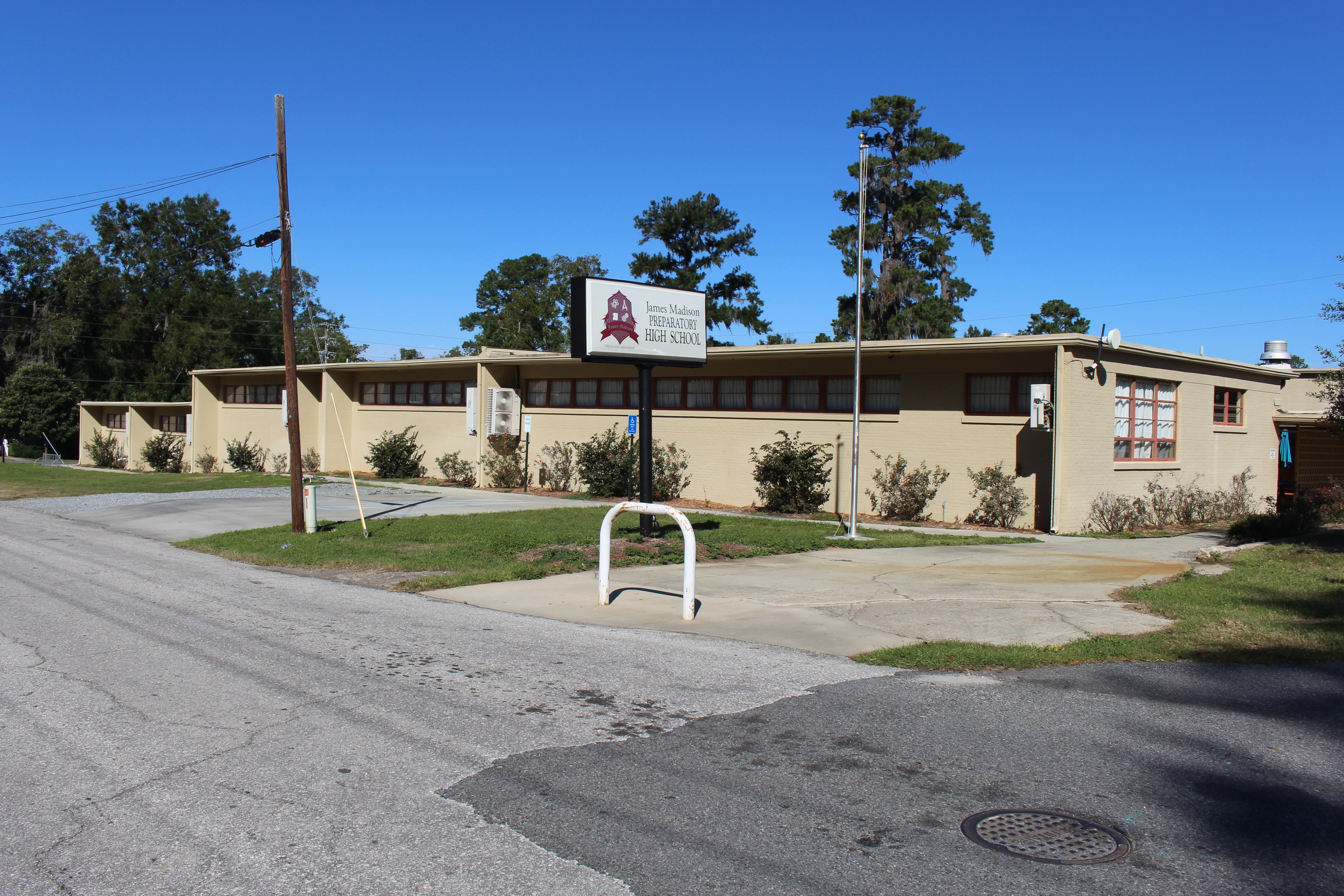
James Madison Preparatory High School (alternative)
