= Bishop-Andrews Hotel =

- U.S. National Register of Historic Places
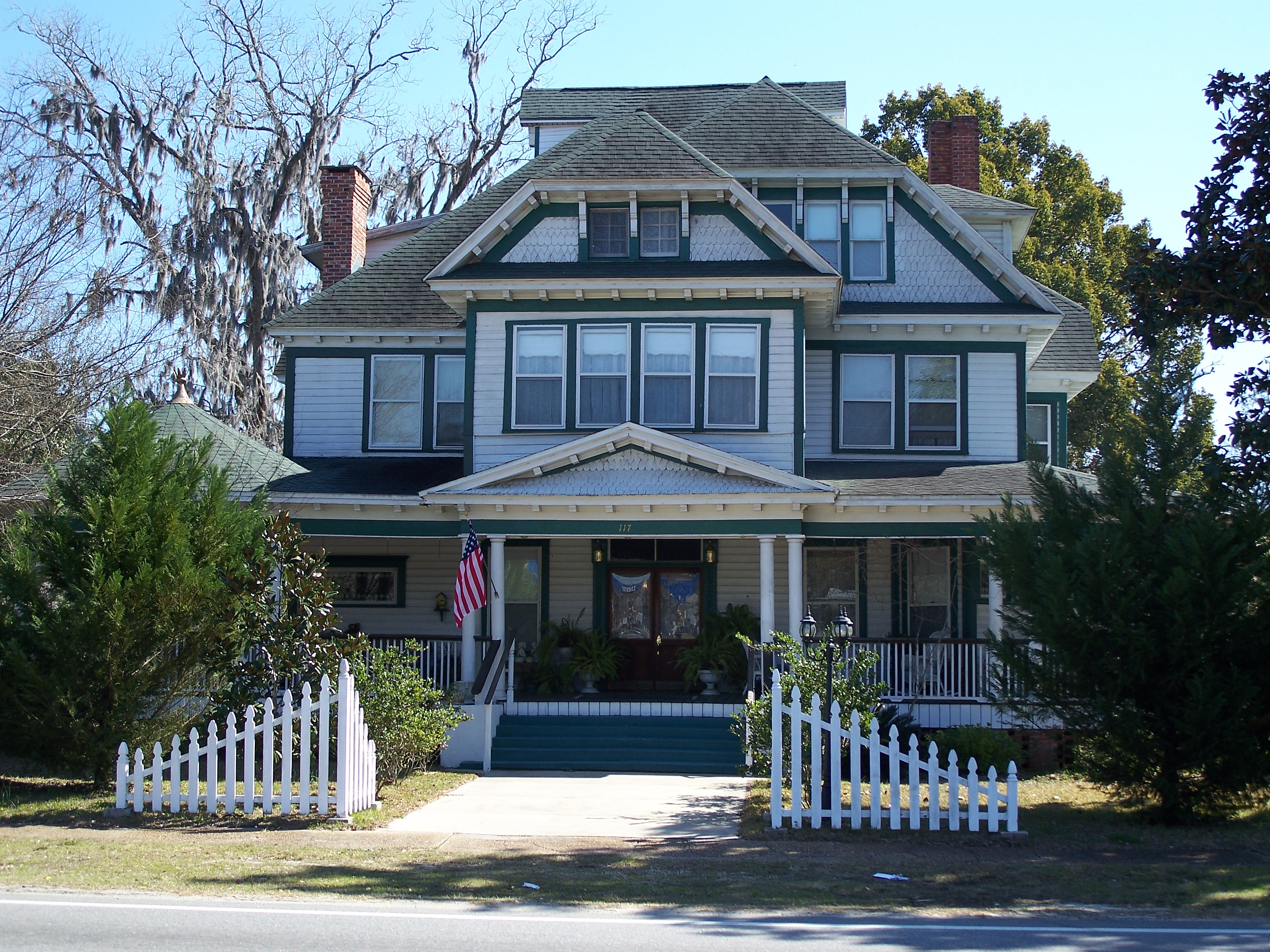

- Location within Florida Location within the United States
- Location: 109 Redding St., Greenville, Florida
- Coordinates: 30°28′9″N 83°37′48″W
- Area: less than one acre
- Built: 1902
- Architectural style: Queen Anne
- NRHP reference No.: 90001002
- Added to NRHP: 28 June 1990

The Bishop-Andrews Hotel is a U.S. historic building in Greenville, Florida. It is located at 117 Redding Street, on U.S. 90. On June 28, 1990, it was added to the U.S. National Register of Historic Places. The building has been converted into the Grace Manor Inn, a bed and breakfast house.

It was built in 1902 as a Queen Anne-style hotel, one block from Greenville's railway station. It is a square three-story building. Its Queen Anne features include its wraparound porch with one segment having a conical roof.
