= Chris Thompson (running back) =

American football player (born 1990)

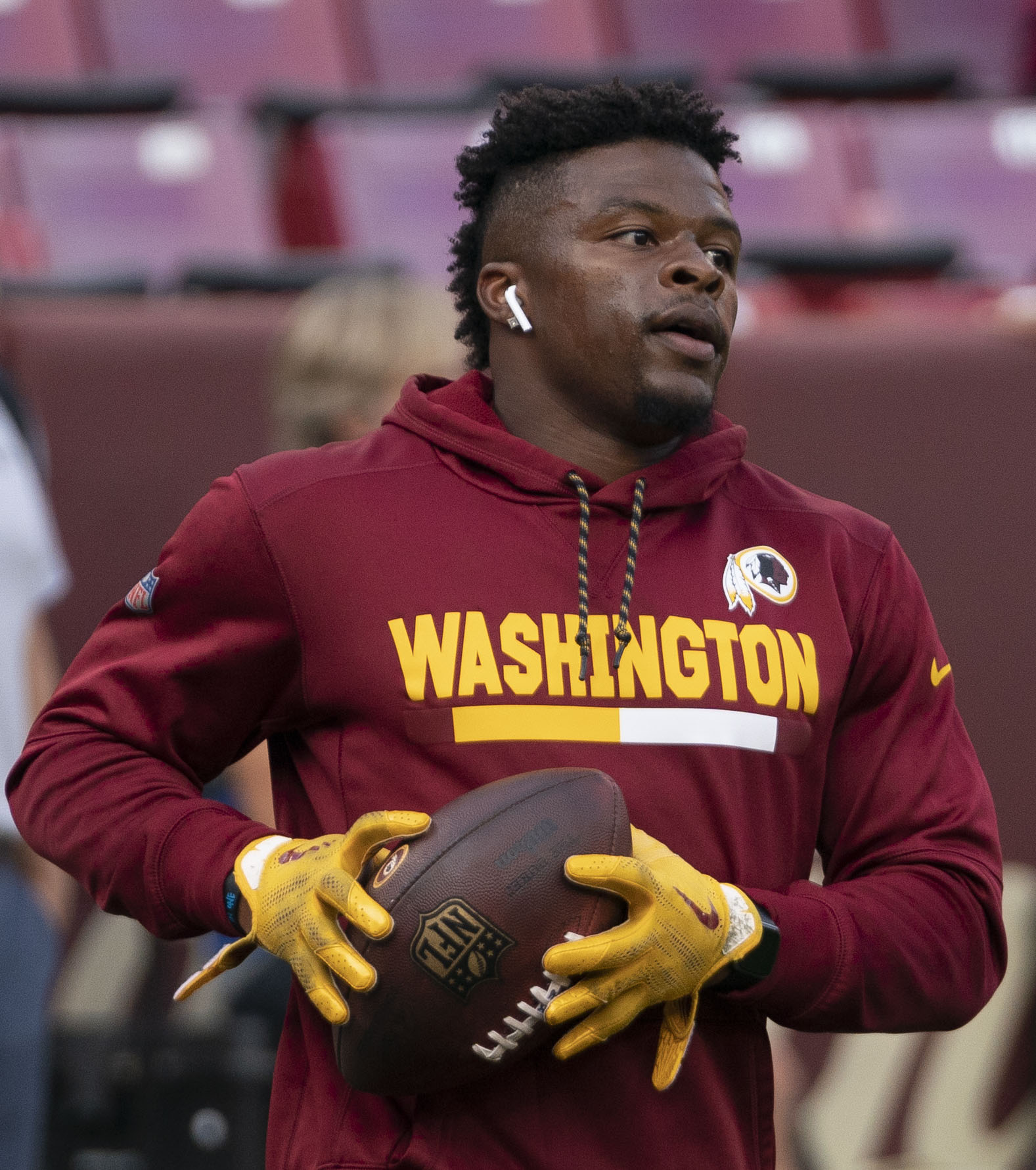
- Thompson with the Washington Redskins in 2018

No. 25, 37, 34
- Position: Running back

Personal information
- Born: October 20, 1990 (age 36); Greenville, Florida, U.S.
- Listed height: 5 ft 8 in (1.73 m)
- Listed weight: 195 lb (88 kg)

Career information
- High school: Madison County (Madison, Florida)
- College: Florida State (2009–2012)
- NFL draft: 2013: 5th round, 154th overall pick

Career history
- Washington Redskins (2013–2019); Jacksonville Jaguars (2020); San Francisco 49ers (2021)*; Chicago Bears (2021)*
- * Offseason or practice squad member only

Awards and highlights
- ACC Brian Piccolo Award (2012); Second-team All-ACC (2012)

Career NFL statistics
- Rushing yards: 1,214
- Rushing average: 4.7
- Rushing touchdowns: 5
- Receptions: 232
- Receiving yards: 1,918
- Receiving touchdowns: 11
- Stats at Pro Football Reference

Chris Thompson (born October 20, 1990) is an American former professional football player who was a running back in the National Football League (NFL). He played college football for the Florida State Seminoles and was selected by the Washington Redskins in the fifth round of the 2013 NFL draft.

== Early life ==
Thompson grew up in Greenville, Florida, and attended and played high school football at Madison County High School. He received offers from Florida State, Clemson, Memphis, and Miami. He chose to attend Florida State.

== College career ==
=== 2009 ===
On October 10, 2009, Thompson ran for a 49-yard gain against Georgia Tech. On October 31, Thompson ran for his first and second touchdown as a Seminole against North Carolina State.

Thompson played in 13 games his freshman year, running for 120 yards on 23 carries and two touchdowns. He also caught two passes for 10 yards. Thompson returned six kickoffs for 150 yards (25.0 average).

=== 2010 ===
On September 4, 2010, Thompson ran for a touchdown and blocked a punt against Samford. On September 18, Thompson ran for 123 yards on nine carries and a touchdown against BYU. On October 2, 2010, Thompson ran for 76 yards on 10 carries and a touchdown against Virginia. On October 9, Thompson ran for 158 yards on 14 carries and a touchdown against Miami. On November 20, Thompson ran for 95 yards and a touchdown against Maryland. On December 31, Thompson ran 147 yards on 25 carries and a touchdown against South Carolina in the 2010 Chick-fil-A Bowl. On December 4, Thompson recorded a 20-yard touchdown reception against Virginia Tech in the 2010 Dr. Pepper ACC Championship Game.

Thompson played in 14 games his sophomore year, running for 845 yards on 134 carries and six touchdowns. He also caught 19 passes for 155 yards and a touchdown. Thompson returned 2 kickoffs for 33 yards (16.5 average).

=== 2011 ===
On September 10, 2011, Thompson ran for 21 yards and a touchdown against Charleston Southern. On October 8, Thompson sustained T5 and T6 compression fractures in his back against Wake Forest which ended his junior season.

Thompson only played in five games as a junior, running for 83 yards on 29 carries and a touchdown. He also caught three passes for 17 yards.

=== 2012 ===
On September 8, 2012, Thompson ran for his first touchdown of the season against Savannah State. On September 15, Thompson ran for 197 yards on 9 carries and two touchdowns against Wake Forest. On September 22, Thompson ran for 103 yards on 15 carries and two touchdowns against Clemson. He also caught 8 passes for 79 yards. On October 6, Thompson ran for 141 yards on 25 carries against NC State. On October 20, Thompson tore his ACL in his left knee against Miami which ended his season.

Thompson played in eight games his senior year, running for 687 yards on 91 carries and five touchdowns. He caught 21 passes for 248 yards.

On January 2, 2013, Thompson, along with teammate and cornerback Xavier Rhodes entered the 2013 NFL draft.

== Professional career ==
Pre-draft measurables
Height	Weight	Arm length	Hand span	Vertical jump	Bench press
5 ft 7 1/8 in (1.70 m)	192 lb (87 kg)	30 1/4 in (0.77 m)	9 1/4 in (0.23 m)	35.0 in (0.89 m)	21 reps
All values from NFL Combine/Pro Day

=== Washington Redskins ===
Thompson was selected by the Washington Redskins in the fifth round, with the 154th overall pick, of the 2013 NFL draft. He signed a four-year contract on May 15, 2013. With Richard Crawford on injured reserve, Thompson was given the return specialist job. After struggling in the first four games of the season, he lost his returner position to Josh Morgan. On November 8, 2013, Thompson was placed on the team's injured reserve due to a torn left labrum. He finished his rookie season with eight kick returns for 160 net yards and seven punt returns for 36 net yards.

The Redskins released Thompson for final roster cuts before the start of the 2014 season, losing the third-string running back position to rookie Silas Redd. He was signed to the team's practice squad after clearing waivers the following day. Thompson was promoted to the active roster on December 11, 2014. Thompson scored a receiving touchdown against the New York Giants in the Week 15 game. The touchdown was the first of Thompson's professional career. His only other action in the 2014 season came in the next game against the Philadelphia Eagles, where he had three receptions for five yards.

On September 24, 2015, Thompson recorded his second career touchdown reception against the New York Giants. Overall, in the 2015 season, he had 216 rushing yards, 35 receptions, 240 receiving yards, and two receiving touchdowns.

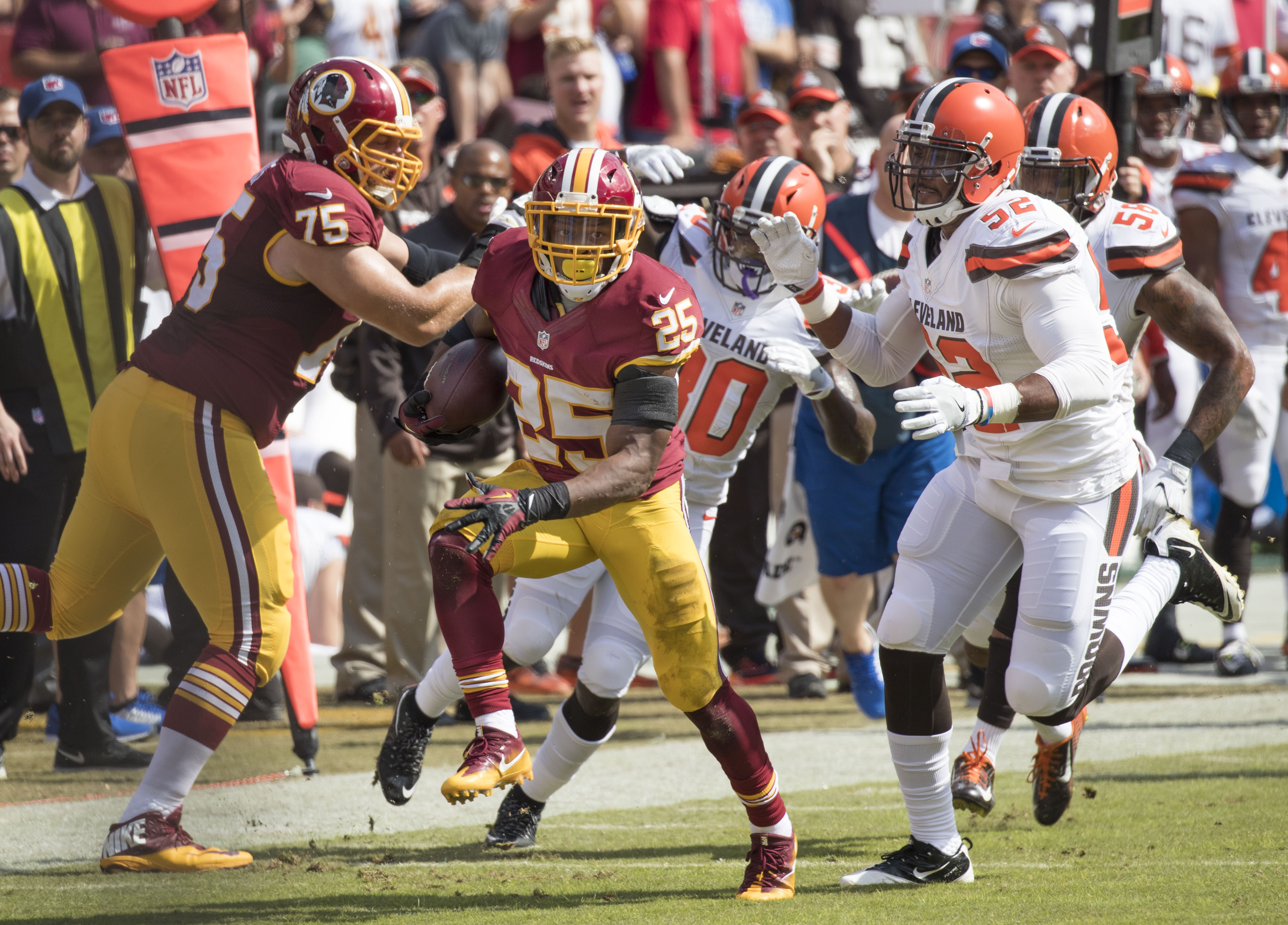
Thompson playing against the Cleveland Browns in 2016.

On March 4, 2016, the Redskins extended a tender to Thompson. He officially accepted and signed the tender on March 17. On September 12, 2016, Thompson scored his first rushing touchdown of his career against the Pittsburgh Steelers. On October 2, 2016, Thompson scored his fifth touchdown of his career, a 5-yard touchdown reception against the Cleveland Browns. On October 23, 2016, Thompson ran for a season-high 73 yards on 12 carries against the Detroit Lions. On December 11, 2016, Thompson ran for 38 yards on three carries and a touchdown against the Philadelphia Eagles. Thompson ran in a 25-yard touchdown, his third touchdown of the season and the sixth of his career. Overall, in the 2016 season, he finished with 356 rushing yards, three rushing touchdowns, 49 receptions, 349 receiving yards, and two receiving touchdowns.

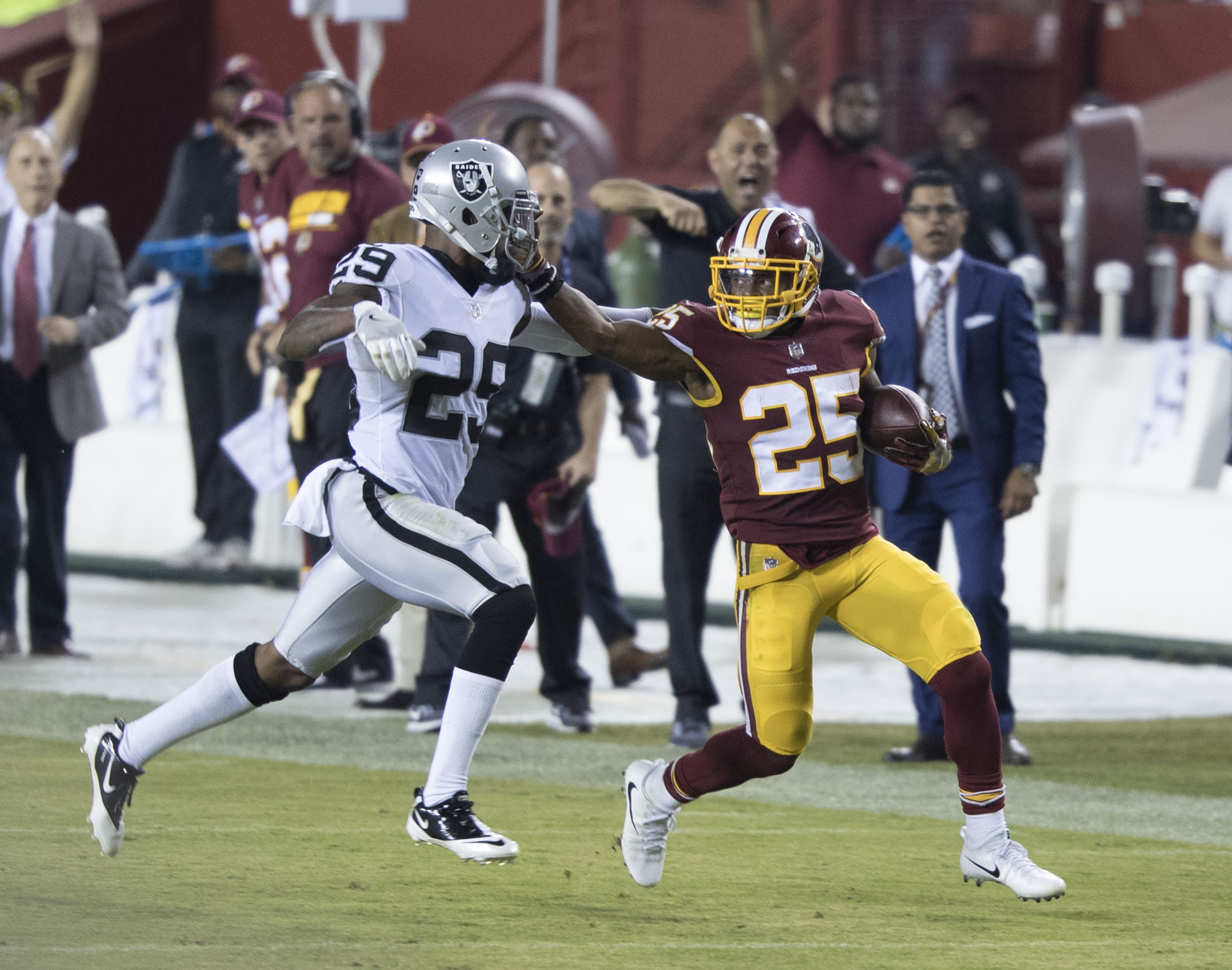
Thompson stiff arms David Amerson in a game against the Oakland Raiders in 2017.

On April 21, 2017, Thompson re-signed with the Redskins. On September 5, 2017, Thompson signed a two-year contract extension with the Redskins. On September 10, 2017, in the season opening 30–17 loss to the Philadelphia Eagles, Thompson recorded a 24-yard receiving touchdown from Cousins. In a Week 2 game against the Los Angeles Rams, Thompson had three rushing attempts for 77 yards and two touchdowns. On September 24, Thompson amassed 188 total yards (150 receiving) in a 27–10 win over the Oakland Raiders on NBC Sunday Night Football. In Week 11, Thompson fractured his fibula and was ruled out for the season. He was placed on injured reserve on November 21, 2017. He finished the 2017 season with 294 rushing yards and two touchdowns, along with 39 receptions for a career-high 510 yards and four touchdowns.

In Week 2, against the Indianapolis Colts, Thompson recorded a career-high 13 receptions for 92 receiving yards in the 21–9 loss. He suffered a rib injury and missed game action. Overall, Thompson played in ten games and had 178 rushing yards and 41 receptions for 268 receiving yards and one receiving touchdown. In 2019, Thompson appeared in 11 games and recorded 37 carries for 138 rushing yards to go along with 42 receptions for 378 receiving yards.

=== Jacksonville Jaguars ===
On May 1, 2020, Thompson signed a one-year contract with the Jacksonville Jaguars. In Week 2 against the Tennessee Titans, Thompson recorded his first receiving touchdown as a Jaguar during the 33–30 loss. He was placed on the reserve/COVID-19 list by the team on October 24, and activated on October 30. He suffered a back injury in Week 10 and was placed on injured reserve on November 16.

=== San Francisco 49ers ===
On September 22, 2021, Thompson was signed to the San Francisco 49ers' practice squad. He was released by San Francisco on October 5.

=== Chicago Bears ===
On October 19, 2021, Thompson was signed to the Chicago Bears practice squad. He was waived by the team on November 3.

== Career statistics ==
=== NFL ===
Year	Team	Games		Rushing							Receiving							
Year	Team	GP	GS	Att	Yards	Avg	Lng	TD	A/G	Y/G	Tgt	Rec	Yards	Avg	Lng	TD	R/G	Y/G
2013	WAS	4	0	—	—	—	—	—	—	—	—	—	—	—	—	—	—	—
2014	WAS	2	0	3	12	4.0	7	0	1.5	6.0	7	6	27	4.5	9	1	3.0	13.5
2015	WAS	13	0	35	216	6.2	42	0	2.7	16.6	48	35	240	6.9	23	2	2.7	18.5
2016	WAS	16	0	68	356	5.2	25	3	4.3	22.3	62	49	349	7.1	38	2	3.1	21.8
2017	WAS	10	1	64	294	4.6	61	2	6.4	29.4	54	39	510	13.1	74	4	3.9	51.0
2018	WAS	10	0	43	178	4.1	16	0	4.3	17.8	55	41	268	6.5	23	1	4.1	26.8
2019	WAS	11	0	37	138	3.7	16	0	3.4	12.5	58	42	378	9.0	39	0	3.8	34.4
2020	JAX	8	0	7	20	2.9	5	0	0.9	2.5	23	20	146	7.3	15	1	2.5	18.3
Career		74	1	257	1,214	4.7	61	5	3.5	16.4	307	232	1,918	8.3	74	11	3.1	25.9

=== College ===
Rushing						Receiving			
Year	Games	Rush	Yards	Avg	TD	Rec	Yards	Avg	TD
2009	11	23	120	5.2	2	2	10	5	0
2010	14	134	845	6.3	6	19	155	8.2	1
2011	5	29	83	2.9	1	3	17	5.7	0
2012	9	91	687	7.5	5	21	248	11.8	0
Career	39	277	1,735	6.3	14	45	430	9.6	1
