= Jesse Solomon =

American football player (born 1963)

No. 54, 58
- Position: Linebacker

Personal information
- Born: November 14, 1963 (age 62); Madison, Florida, U.S.
- Listed height: 6 ft 0 in (1.83 m)
- Listed weight: 249 lb (113 kg)

Career information
- High school: Madison
- College: Florida State
- NFL draft: 1986: 12th round, 318th overall pick

Career history
- Minnesota Vikings (1986–1989); Dallas Cowboys (1989–1990); Tampa Bay Buccaneers (1991); Atlanta Falcons (1992–1993); Miami Dolphins (1994)

Awards and highlights
- NFL combined tackles leader (1987)

Career NFL statistics
- Tackles: 804
- Sacks: 10
- Interceptions: 8
- Stats at Pro Football Reference

Jesse William Solomon (born November 4, 1963) is an American former professional football player who was a linebacker in the National Football League (NFL) for the Minnesota Vikings, Dallas Cowboys, Tampa Bay Buccaneers, Atlanta Falcons, and Miami Dolphins. He played college football for the Florida State Seminoles and was selected by the Vikings in the 12th round of the 1986 NFL draft.

== Early life ==
Solomon attended Madison High School but he did not play football until his junior year when he started on the defensive line. He was not allowed to play in his senior season because of differences with the school administration. He also practiced track.

He moved on to North Florida Junior College where he played intramural football for one season.

In 1983, he walked on at Florida State University and spent a year with the scout team. As a junior, he became a backup linebacker and special teams player. As a senior, he blocked a punt and recovered it in the end zone for a touchdown against Tulane University. He finished his college career with 99 tackles, one interception and 2 fumble recoveries.

== Professional career ==
=== Minnesota Vikings ===
Solomon was selected by the Minnesota Vikings in the twelfth round (318th overall) of the 1986 NFL draft, after a private workout with scout Ralph Kohl and being rated high for his athletic abilities. As a rookie he led the team with 17 special teams tackles and was third on the team with 96 defensive tackles, despite missing 3 games due to an injury and starting only 4 others. One of his starts came at middle linebacker.

In his second season, he became a full-time starter at left outside linebacker and led the team in tackles (126) when Chris Doleman was moved to defensive end. He also had 2 sacks, one interception, 3 passes defensed and 3 forced fumbles.

In 1988, he led the top-ranked Vikings defense with 121 tackles (95 solo), while also making 4 interceptions, one pass defensed, one forced fumble, 2 fumble recoveries and 2.5 sacks. He suffered a knee injury in the season finale against the Chicago Bears, forcing him to sit out the playoffs. Against the New Orleans Saints, he had 10 tackles, one sack and returned an interception 78 yards for a touchdown. Against the Green Bay Packers, he had a career-high 17 tackles.

On October 12, 1989, he was sent to the Dallas Cowboys as part of the Herschel Walker trade. At the time he started one game and had 8 tackles.

=== Dallas Cowboys ===
In 1989, he didn't start because there were conditional draft picks attached to the Vikings traded players and the Dallas Cowboys wanted the selections instead of keeping Solomon and the others. Head coach Jimmy Johnson eventually had second thoughts on the February 1 deadline and traded three future draft choices (third-round and tenth-round in 1990 and a third-round in 1991) to the Vikings for the right to retain the original full package of draft choices, plus Solomon, Issiac Holt and David Howard. He split snaps with Ken Norton Jr. at weakside linebacker during the second half of the season, with his only start coming as an outside linebacker when the team went to a 3-4 defense against the Miami Dolphins. He had 7 tackles in the twelfth game against the Philadelphia Eagles. He finished with 43 tackles (15 solo), one quarterback pressure and one forced fumble.

In 1990, he missed all of training camp in a contract holdout and reported to the team after the seventh game of the regular season. He played mostly in pass situations rest of the season, registering 13 tackles, one sack, one quarterback pressure, 2 passes defensed and 2 forced fumbles.

On August 21, 1991, when told of his demotion to the second team from his starting strongside linebacker position, he walked out of the Cowboys' training camp and would eventually be traded to the New England Patriots in exchange for a sixth round draft choice (#149-Fallon Wacasey) on September 15.

=== Tampa Bay Buccaneers ===
On September 18, 1991, the New England Patriots traded Solomon to the Tampa Bay Buccaneers in exchange for a fifth round draft choice (#116-Dwayne Sabb). It has been speculated that the Patriots were used as a bridge team, because of a clause in the Herschel Walker trade that prohibited the Dallas Cowboys from sending any of the players involved to a team in the NFC Central division.

Reunited with his former Vikings defensive coordinator Floyd Peters, Solomon went on to record 128 tackles (91 solo) in just 12 starts. On August 21, 1992, a contract holdout caused him to be released.

=== Atlanta Falcons ===
On September 4, 1992, he signed with the Atlanta Falcons. On December 13, when he played against his former team the Buccaneers, he persuaded head coach Jerry Glanville to let him carry the ball as a running back after the Falcons had run up the score, posting 2 carries for 12 yards. He finished with 147 tackles as the starter at inside linebacker.

In 1993, the team changed to a 4-3 defense and he was moved to middle linebacker. He wasn't re-signed at the end of the year.

=== Miami Dolphins ===
On September 14, 1994, he signed as a free agent with the Miami Dolphins. He only made one tackle in two stints with the team, even though the Dolphins reached the AFC Divisional Playoff game. He wasn't re-signed at the end of the season.

== Coaching career ==
Solomon earned a coaching certificate and degree from Florida State University and was the head coach for Forest Hill High School in West Palm Beach, Florida between 2001 and 2003.
