= Madison County, Florida =

County in Florida, United States

- County
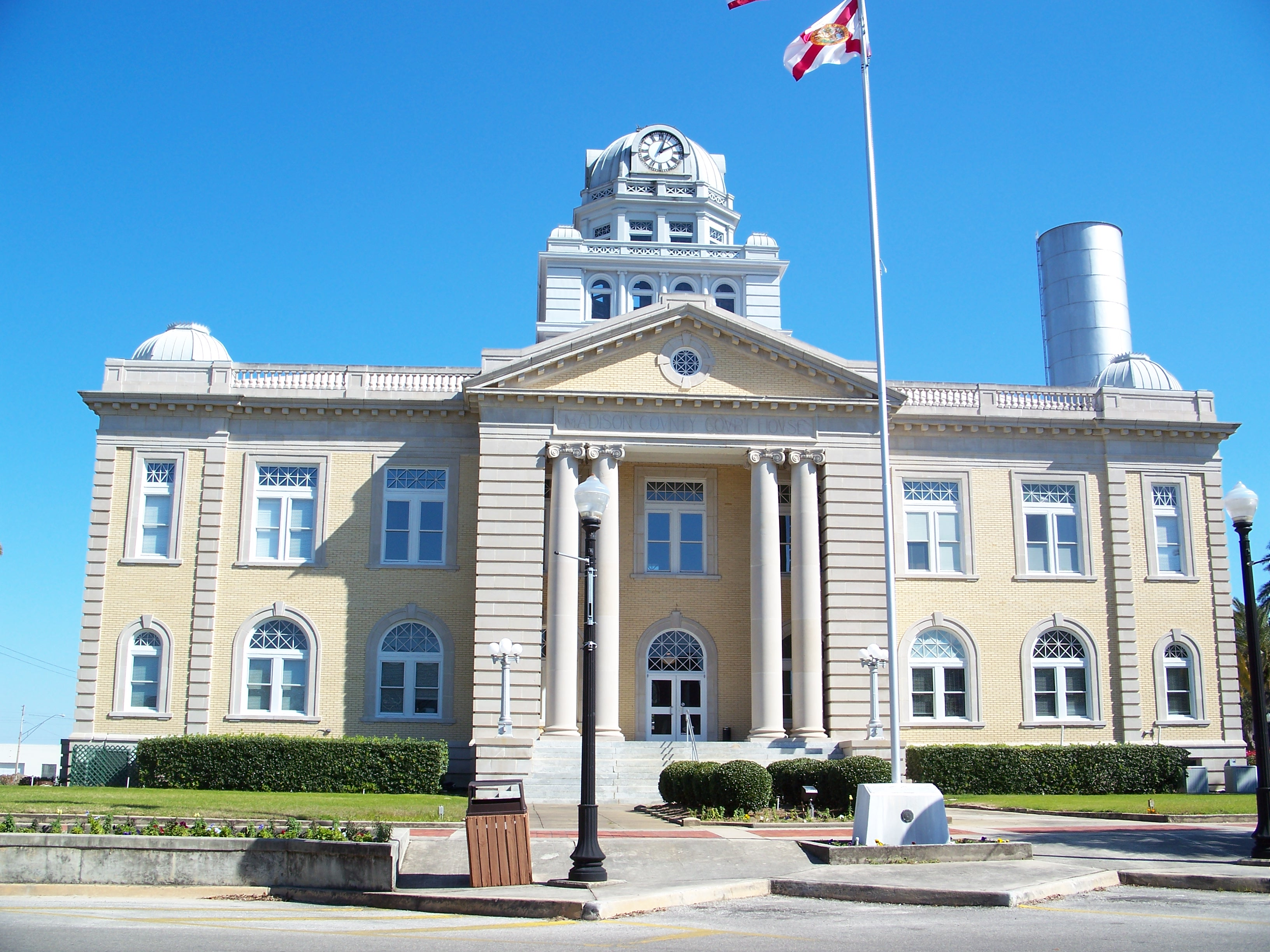
- Madison County Courthouse

- Location within the U.S. state of Florida
- Coordinates: 30°27′N 83°28′W
- Country: United States
- State: Florida
- Founded: December 26, 1827
- Named for: James Madison
- Seat: Madison
- Largest city: Madison

Area
  - Total: 716 sq mi (1,850 km^{2})
  - Land: 696 sq mi (1,800 km^{2})
  - Water: 20 sq mi (52 km^{2}) 2.8%

Population (2020)
  - Total: 17,968
  - Estimate (2025): 18,759 ▲
  - Density: 25.8/sq mi (9.97/km^{2})
- Time zone: UTC−5 (Eastern)
  - Summer (DST): UTC−4 (EDT)
- Congressional district: 2nd
- Website: www.madisoncountyfl.com

Madison County is a county located in the Big Bend region of the U.S. state of Florida. As of the 2020 census, the population was 17,968. Its county seat is Madison.

== History ==
Located in what is known as the Florida Panhandle, Madison County was created in 1827. It was named for James Madison, fourth President of the United States of America, who served from 1809 to 1817. It was developed as part of the plantation belt, with cotton cultivated and processed by enslaved African Americans. The county's economic and population growth was stagnant from the 1880s and for several decades into the early 20th century.

In the period after Reconstruction, racial violence rose in the state, reaching a peak at the end of the 19th century and extending into the difficult economic years of the 1920s and 1930s. According to the Equal Justice Institute's 2015 report, Lynching in America: Confronting Racial Terror, from 1877 to 1950, Madison County had 16 lynchings in this period, the 6th highest of any county in the state.

In 1945, the county's population of 15,537 was divided evenly between black and white.

The last known lynching in the county was that in October 1945 of Jesse James Payne, a young married sharecropper with a child. After an economic dispute with the white landowner where he was sharecropping, where Payne escaped murder following "a demand for an unjust debt repayment", he was charged with sexually assaulting the landowner's daughter, but was innocent. The sheriff and other law enforcement officials appeared implicated in Payne's murder, as he was left in the county jail unguarded after mob action had been threatened. Payne's was the only recorded lynching nationwide that year, when World War II ended. The case received national attention and the governor was strongly criticized for failure to mount a true investigation or to take action against the sheriff.

In 1949, Ernest Thomas, a WWII veteran, was tracked to a swamp in Madison County after he had fled from a wrongful accusation of rape in Groveland, Florida. He was found sleeping under a tree and was shot an estimated 400 times by a lynch mob led by Lake County Sheriff Willis V. McCall.

As of August 2012, Madison County became a wet county, meaning that voters had approved the legal sale, possession, or distribution of alcoholic beverages.

== Geography ==
According to the U.S. Census Bureau, the county has a total area of 716 square miles (1,850 km^{2}), of which 696 square miles (1,800 km^{2}) is land and 20 square miles (52 km^{2}) (2.8%) is water.

=== Adjacent counties ===
- Brooks County, Georgia – north
- Lowndes County, Georgia – northeast
- Hamilton County – east
- Suwannee County – southeast
- Lafayette County – southeast
- Taylor County – southwest
- Jefferson County – west

== Demographics ==
Historical population
Census	Pop.	Note	%±
1830	525		—
1840	2,644		403.6%
1850	5,490		107.6%
1860	7,779		41.7%
1870	11,121		43.0%
1880	14,798		33.1%
1890	14,316		−3.3%
1900	15,446		7.9%
1910	16,919		9.5%
1920	16,516		−2.4%
1930	15,614		−5.5%
1940	16,190		3.7%
1950	14,197		−12.3%
1960	14,154		−0.3%
1970	13,481		−4.8%
1980	14,894		10.5%
1990	16,569		11.2%
2000	18,733		13.1%
2010	19,224		2.6%
2020	17,968		−6.5%
2025 (est.)	18,759	▲	4.4%
U.S. Decennial Census; 1790-1960 1900-1990; 1990-2000 2010-2019

=== 2020 census ===
As of the 2020 census, the county had a population of 17,968, 6,877 households, and 4,232 families; the median age was 45.3 years. 19.9% of residents were under the age of 18 and 22.7% of residents were 65 years of age or older. For every 100 females there were 107.7 males, and for every 100 females age 18 and over there were 108.3 males age 18 and over.

Of the 6,877 households in the county, 27.0% had children under the age of 18 living in them. Of all households, 42.6% were married-couple households, 19.8% were households with a male householder and no spouse or partner present, and 32.6% were households with a female householder and no spouse or partner present. About 30.3% of all households were made up of individuals and 14.5% had someone living alone who was 65 years of age or older.

There were 8,315 housing units, of which 17.3% were vacant. Among occupied housing units, 73.5% were owner-occupied and 26.5% were renter-occupied. The homeowner vacancy rate was 1.8% and the rental vacancy rate was 10.2%.

The racial makeup of the county was 58.0% White, 35.1% Black or African American, 0.3% American Indian and Alaska Native, 0.3% Asian, <0.1% Native Hawaiian and Pacific Islander, 1.8% from some other race, and 4.5% from two or more races. Hispanic or Latino residents of any race comprised 4.9% of the population.

Fewer than 0.1% of residents lived in urban areas, while 100.0% lived in rural areas.

=== Racial and ethnic composition ===
Madison County, Florida – Racial and ethnic composition Note: the US Census treats Hispanic/Latino as an ethnic category. This table excludes Latinos from the racial categories and assigns them to a separate category. Hispanics/Latinos may be of any race.
Race / Ethnicity (NH = Non-Hispanic)	Pop 1980	Pop 1990	Pop 2000	Pop 2010	Pop 2020	% 1980	% 1990	% 2000	% 2010	% 2020
White alone (NH)	8,466	9,409	10,378	10,582	10,132	56.84%	56.79%	55.40%	55.05%	56.39%
Black or African American alone (NH)	6,251	6,867	7,475	7,423	6,281	41.97%	41.44%	39.90%	38.61%	34.96%
Native American or Alaska Native alone (NH)	14	52	55	76	53	0.09%	0.31%	0.29%	0.40%	0.29%
Asian alone (NH)	12	8	60	43	45	0.08%	0.05%	0.32%	0.22%	0.25%
Native Hawaiian or Pacific Islander alone (NH)	x	x	4	0	0	x	x	0.02%	0.00%	0.00%
Other race alone (NH)	12	2	5	6	63	0.08%	0.01%	0.03%	0.03%	0.35%
Mixed race or Multiracial (NH)	x	x	156	195	513	x	x	0.83%	1.01%	2.86%
Hispanic or Latino (any race)	139	231	600	899	881	0.93%	1.39%	3.20%	4.68%	4.90%
Total	14,894	16,569	18,733	19,224	17,968	100.00%	100.00%	100.00%	100.00%	100.00%

=== 2000 census ===
As of the census of 2000, there were 18,733 people, 6,629 households, and 4,680 families residing in the county. The population density was 27 people per square mile (10 people/km^{2}). There were 7,836 housing units at an average density of 11 per square mile (4.2/km^{2}). The racial makeup of the county was 57.49% Caucasian, 40.30% Black or African American, 0.32% Native American, 0.32% Asian, 0.02% Pacific Islander, 0.51% from other races, and 1.04% from two or more races. 3.20% of the population were Hispanic or Latino of any race.

There were 6,629 households, out of which 31.90% had children under the age of 18 living with them, 48.90% were married couples living together, 17.50% had a female householder with no husband present, and 29.40% were non-families. 25.40% of all households were made up of individuals, and 11.60% had someone living alone who was 65 years of age or older. The average household size was 2.57 and the average family size was 3.06.

In the county, the population was spread out, with 25.30% under the age of 18, 9.20% from 18 to 24, 28.20% from 25 to 44, 22.70% from 45 to 64, and 14.60% who were 65 years of age or older. The median age was 36 years. For every 100 females there were 107.60 males. For every 100 females age 18 and over, there were 106.80 males.

The median income for a household in the county was $26,533, and the median income for a family was $31,753. Males had a median income of $25,255 versus $19,607 for females. The per capita income for the county was $12,511. About 18.90% of families and 23.10% of the population were below the poverty line, including 30.10% of those under age 18 and 22.50% of those age 65 or over.

== Transportation ==
=== Major highways ===
- I-10 (Interstate 10 / SR 8) is the main interstate highway through Madison County, running west and east through the panhandle from Alabama to Jacksonville. Four interchanges exist in the county at US 221 south of Greenville, (Exit 241), SR 14 (Exit 251) and SR 53 (Exit 258) south of Madison, and CR 255 south of Lee (Exit 262).
- US 19 / US 27 (SR 20) is a multiplexed pair of south-to-north US highways that briefly runs through the southwestern corner of the county known as the Florida-Georgia Parkway.
- US 90 (SR 10) was the main west-to-east route through Madison County until it was supplanted by I-10.
- US 221 (SR 55) is the main south-to-north US highway in western Madison County.
- SR 6 runs northeast from US 90 into Jasper in Hamilton County east of Madison.
- SR 14 is a short state road from I-10 to US 90 in Madison, with a western county extension in Taylor and Madison Counties, and a truck route to SR 53 (see below).
- SR 53 is a south-to-north state road that runs from I-10 at exit 251 through Madison, and eventually the Georgia State Line. It also has a southern bi-county extension that runs through Day, Florida, and Buckville, Florida in Lafayette County at US 27.
- SR 145, a south-to-north state road in northeastern Madison County The route begins at the eastern terminus of the US 90/SR 53 overlap in Madison, then turns to the northeast towards Valdosta, across the Georgia State Line.

=== Railroads ===
Madison County has at least two railroad lines. The primary one is a CSX line formerly owned by the Seaboard Air Line Railroad; it served Amtrak's Sunset Limited until it was truncated to New Orleans in 2005 by Hurricane Katrina. The station was Madison County's only active passenger railroad station until that point. The other line is owned by the Georgia and Florida Railway, and runs in close proximity to US 221 throughout Madison County.

== Education ==
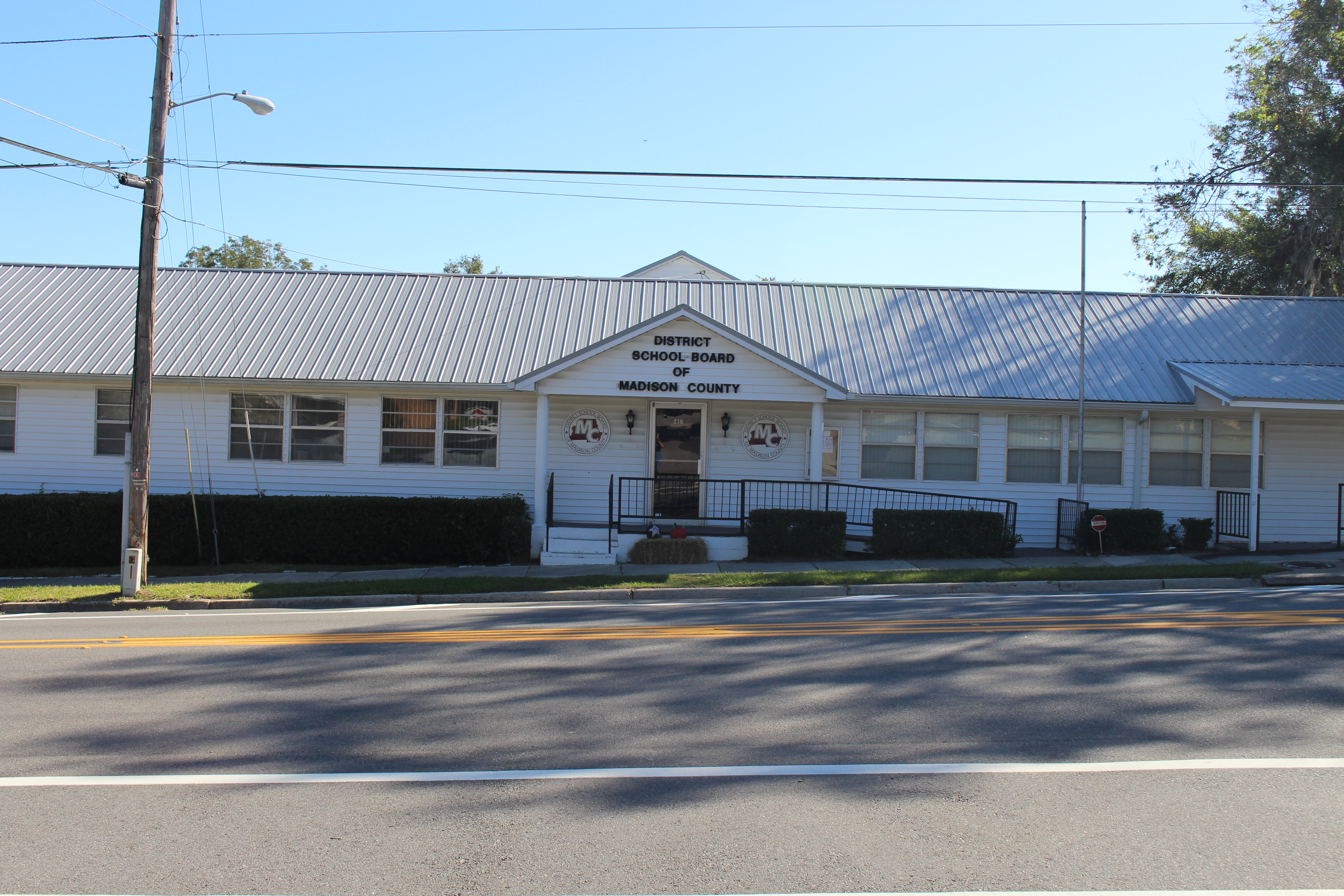
Madison County Schools headquarters

Madison County Schools operates public schools. Madison County High School is one of the two high schools in Madison, the other is a charter high school, James Madison Preparatory High School.

There are two high performing charter schools in Madison County and are as follows:

Madison Creative Arts Academy (K-8) mcaa.academy James Madison Preparatory High School (9–12) jmphs.org

=== Libraries ===
Madison County is served by the Suwannee River Regional Library System, which contains eight branches and also serves Hamilton and Suwannee counties.

- Branford
- Greenville
- Jasper
- Jennings
- Lee
- Live Oak
- Madison
- White Springs

== Communities ==
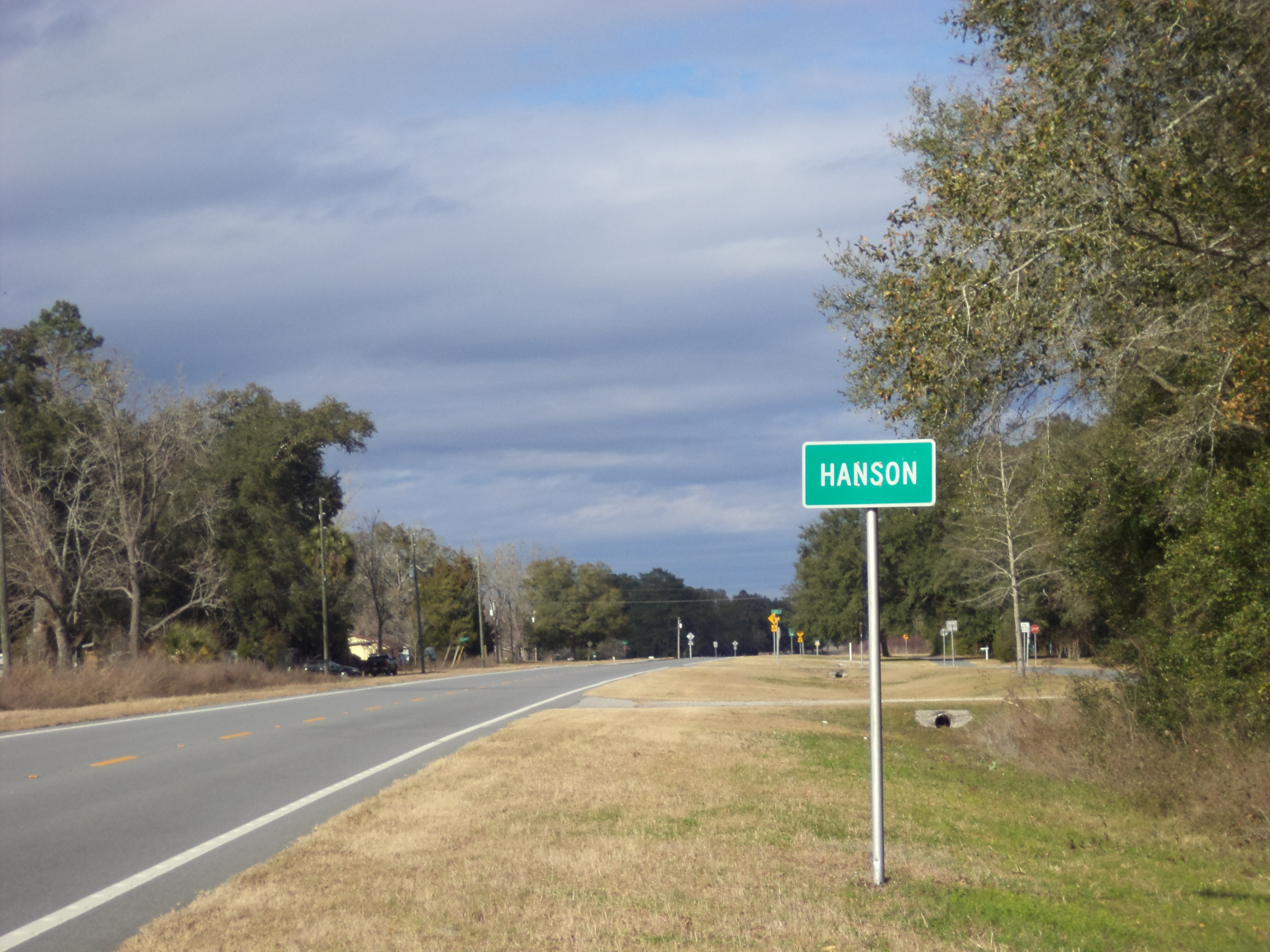
Hanson on State Road 145

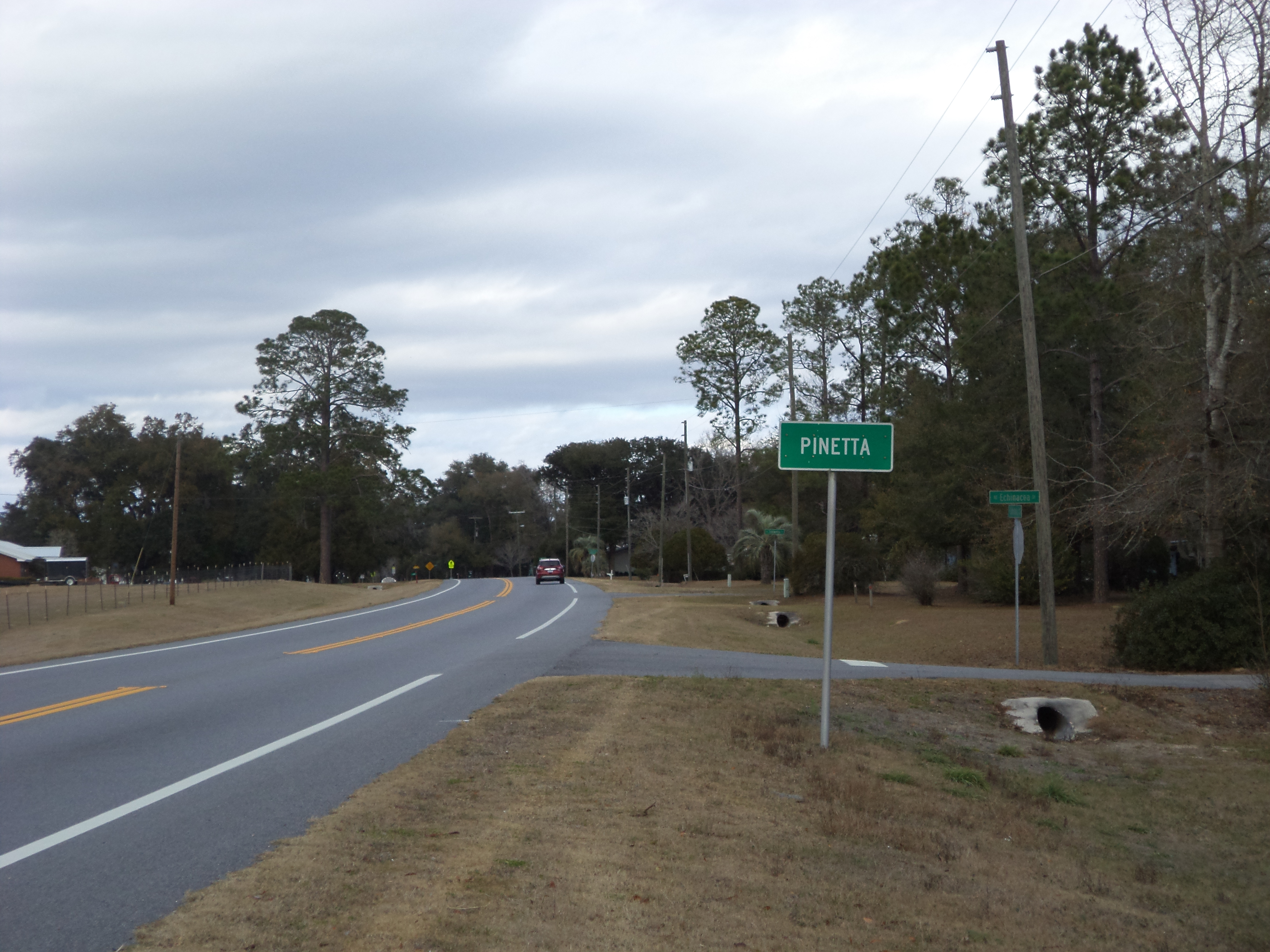
Pinetta on State Road 145

=== City ===
- Madison

=== Towns ===
- Greenville
- Lee

=== Unincorporated communities ===
- Cherry Lake
- Hamburg
- Hanson
- Hopewell
- Lamont
- Lovett
- Pinetta
- Sirmans

== Politics ==
Like the rest of the Solid South, Madison County was reliably Democratic, with no Republican carrying it until 1964. Democrats were still able to carry the county after 1964, with Jimmy Carter and Bill Clinton each carrying the county twice, but their performance began to falter afterwards. Democrats remained competitive in the presidential elections in the county all the way through 2012, with Barack Obama losing the county by just over 3 percent in both 2008 and 2012. However, the county has not been competitive in the post-Obama years. Kamala Harris got just 35% of the vote in the county in 2024, which was the worst since 1972 in terms of percentage of the county vote share.

United States presidential election results for Madison County, Florida
Year	Republican		Democratic		Third party(ies)	
Year	No.	%	No.	%	No.	%
1904	66	9.73%	595	87.76%	17	2.51%
1908	32	5.38%	511	85.88%	52	8.74%
1912	16	2.92%	480	87.59%	52	9.49%
1916	22	2.74%	721	89.79%	60	7.47%
1920	30	3.04%	920	93.31%	36	3.65%
1924	23	3.88%	538	90.73%	32	5.40%
1928	266	25.70%	769	74.30%	0	0.00%
1932	221	12.12%	1,602	87.88%	0	0.00%
1936	184	7.47%	2,278	92.53%	0	0.00%
1940	440	15.38%	2,421	84.62%	0	0.00%
1944	293	13.28%	1,914	86.72%	0	0.00%
1948	207	9.00%	1,189	51.70%	904	39.30%
1952	1,209	42.66%	1,625	57.34%	0	0.00%
1956	1,017	33.01%	2,064	66.99%	0	0.00%
1960	1,152	35.60%	2,084	64.40%	0	0.00%
1964	2,822	57.09%	2,121	42.91%	0	0.00%
1968	654	13.81%	1,378	29.10%	2,703	57.09%
1972	3,236	72.92%	1,187	26.75%	15	0.34%
1976	1,761	34.94%	3,218	63.85%	61	1.21%
1980	2,280	41.39%	3,134	56.89%	95	1.72%
1984	2,819	57.30%	2,101	42.70%	0	0.00%
1988	2,563	56.59%	1,951	43.08%	15	0.33%
1992	2,007	34.38%	2,648	45.36%	1,183	20.26%
1996	2,195	39.29%	2,794	50.01%	598	10.70%
2000	3,038	49.29%	3,015	48.92%	110	1.78%
2004	4,191	50.47%	4,050	48.77%	63	0.76%
2008	4,544	51.02%	4,270	47.94%	93	1.04%
2012	4,474	51.27%	4,176	47.85%	77	0.88%
2016	4,851	56.80%	3,526	41.29%	163	1.91%
2020	5,576	59.36%	3,747	39.89%	70	0.75%
2024	5,874	64.01%	3,231	35.21%	71	0.77%

== Notable residents ==
The small town of Greenville was the childhood home of rhythm and blues giant Ray Charles. Professional football player Chris Thompson is also from the Town of Greenville. Professional baseball player Lorenzo Cain is from Madison County. Scott Phillips, drummer for the bands Creed and Alter Bridge is also from Madison.

== See also ==
- National Register of Historic Places listings in Madison County, Florida
