= Madison County High School (Florida) =

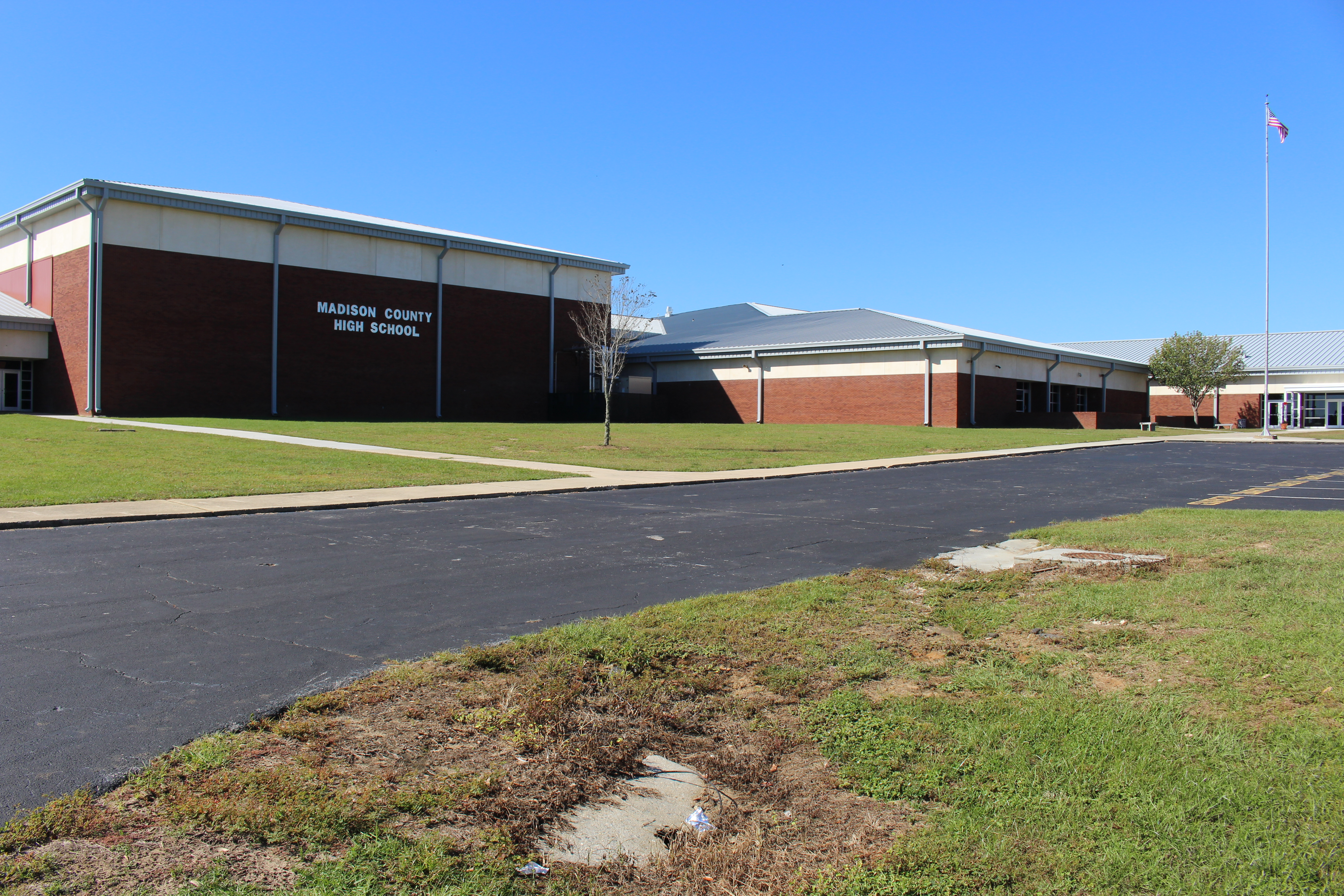

Location
- 2649 West US Hwy 90; Madison, FL 32340
- 30.4807°N 83.4541°W

Information
- School district: Madison County Schools
- Principal: Charles Finley
- Staff: 25.00 (FTE)
- Enrollment: 464 (2024–2025)
- Student to teacher ratio: 18.56
- Color
- Team name: Cowboys
- Website: mchs.madison.k12.fl.us

Madison County High School (MCHS) is a public high school in unincorporated Madison County, Florida, west of Madison. It is a part of the Madison County Schools district.

In 2022 it had 492 students and more than 50 percent of the student body was African American.

Cowboys are the school mascot. In 2021 it won its fourth 1A state football championship in five years.

On February 24, 2026, controversy ensued as district issued teacher, Leslie Fletcher, repeatedly used the N word while addressing students. Video evidence of the incident resulted in her punishment of what some claimed as a “slap on the wrist”. This included a formal apology, reassignment of her duties within the school, and a mandatory professional development class. Fletcher emphasized her use of the slur was in “interrogative context” rather than as an insult. The video captures her second use of the slur.

== Alumni ==
- Geno Hayes linebacker at Florida State and in the NFL
- Chris Thompson, football running back
- Jacobbi McDaniel, football player
- Jesse Solomon, football player
