= Madison, Florida =

- City
- City of Madison
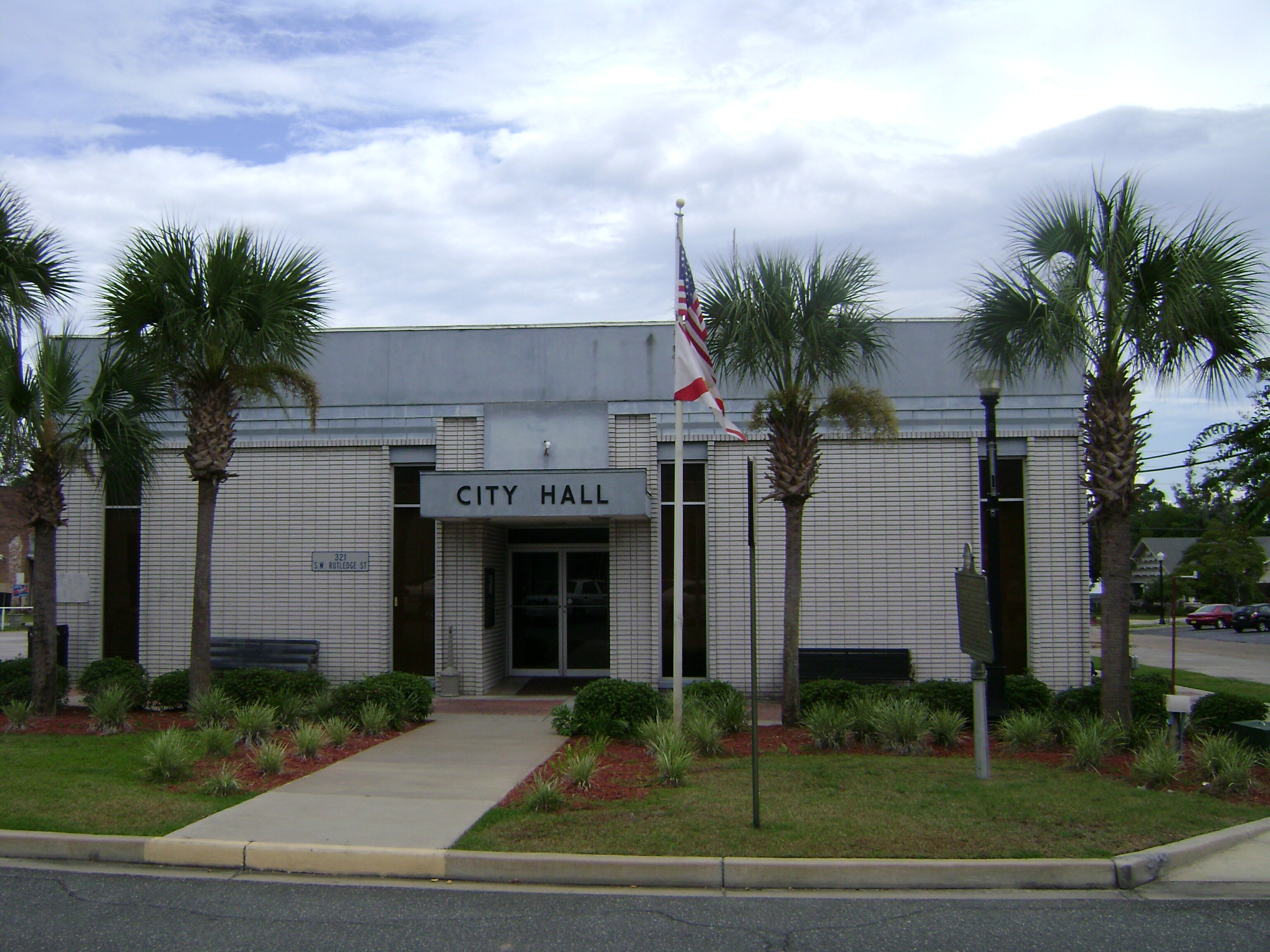
- Madison City Hall

- Seal
- Motto: "The City of Four Freedoms"
- Location in Madison County and the state of Florida
- Coordinates: 30°28′N 83°25′W
- Country: United States
- State: Florida
- County: Madison
- Settled: May 2, 1838
- Incorporated: 1945

Government
  - Type: Commission–Manager
  - Mayor: Jamarien "J.P." Moore
  - Mayor Pro Tem: Voncyle Wilson
  - Commissioners: Terry Martin, Rene Alexander, and Craig Anderson
  - City Manager: Stanford Amos
  - City Clerk: Lee Anne Hall

Area
  - Total: 2.69 sq mi (7.0 km^{2})
  - Land: 2.64 sq mi (6.8 km^{2})
  - Water: 0.05 sq mi (0.13 km^{2})
- Elevation: 190 ft (58 m)

Population (2020)
  - Total: 2,912
  - Density: 1,104.7/sq mi (426.5/km^{2})
- Time zone: UTC-5 (Eastern (EST))
  - Summer (DST): UTC-4 (EDT)
- ZIP codes: 32340-32341
- Area code(s): 850, 448
- FIPS code: 12-42425
- GNIS feature ID: 0286274
- Website: www.cityofmadisonfl.com

Madison is a city in and the county seat of Madison County, on the central northern border of Florida, United States. The population was 2,912 at the 2020 census.

== History ==
The territory now known as Madison County was ruled at various times by Spain and The United States of America. This area was developed for cotton plantations dependent on the labor of enslaved African Americans. After the Civil War and emancipation, many freedmen and their descendants stayed in the region, working as sharecroppers or tenant farmers.

Racial violence of whites against Black people increased after the Reconstruction era, reaching a peak near the turn of the 20th century. The following African Americans were lynched in Madison: Randall Coleman on October 15, 1868, Charles Savage and Howard James on August 25, 1882, Charles Martin, February 1, 1899; both James Denson and his stepson, January 7, 1901; and an unidentified man, February 9, 1906.

This was also the home of Colin Kelly, World War II hero who was the first American B-17 to be shot down in combat on December 10, 1941, the city of four freedoms is the reference to the four freedoms speech given by FDR in 1941.

Despite being a community that's been settled since May 2, 1838, the City of Madison wasn't officially incorporated as a municipality until 1945.

== Geography ==
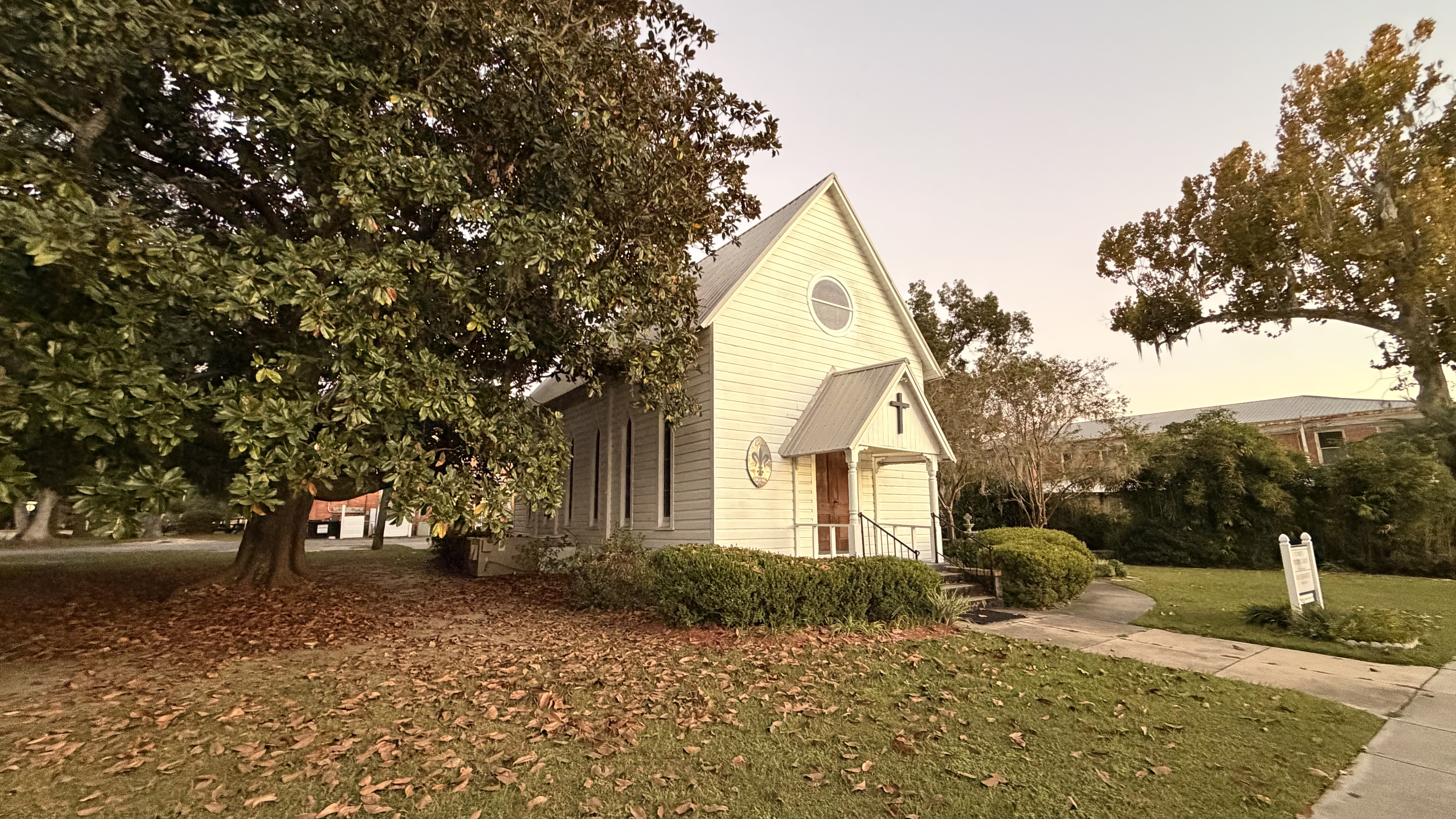
A front three quarters view of St. Marys Episcopal Church

Madison is located slightly east of the center of Madison County. U.S. Route 90 passes through the center of town, leading west 56 miles (90 km) to Tallahassee, the state capital, and southeast 52 miles (84 km) to Lake City. Interstate 10 passes 4 miles (6 km) to the south of Madison with access from exits 251 and 258.

According to the United States Census Bureau, the city has a total area of 2.7 square miles (7.0 km^{2}), of which 0.05 square miles (0.13 km^{2}), or 1.93%, are water.

=== Climate ===
The climate for the City of Madison is characterized by hot, humid summers and generally mild to cool winters. According to the Köppen Climate Classification system, Madison has a humid subtropical climate zone, abbreviated "Cfa" on climate maps.

Climate data for Madison, Florida, 1991–2020 normals, extremes 1892–2017
Month	Jan	Feb	Mar	Apr	May	Jun	Jul	Aug	Sep	Oct	Nov	Dec	Year
Record high °F (°C)	88 (31)	87 (31)	99 (37)	96 (36)	103 (39)	106 (41)	106 (41)	103 (39)	101 (38)	98 (37)	91 (33)	89 (32)	106 (41)
Mean maximum °F (°C)	77.6 (25.3)	80.3 (26.8)	84.9 (29.4)	88.8 (31.6)	93.4 (34.1)	97.4 (36.3)	97.3 (36.3)	97.2 (36.2)	94.2 (34.6)	90.0 (32.2)	83.9 (28.8)	79.3 (26.3)	99.4 (37.4)
Mean daily maximum °F (°C)	63.0 (17.2)	67.0 (19.4)	73.4 (23.0)	79.2 (26.2)	85.8 (29.9)	89.7 (32.1)	90.9 (32.7)	90.6 (32.6)	87.0 (30.6)	80.5 (26.9)	71.7 (22.1)	65.5 (18.6)	78.7 (25.9)
Daily mean °F (°C)	51.6 (10.9)	55.3 (12.9)	60.9 (16.1)	67.0 (19.4)	74.1 (23.4)	79.6 (26.4)	81.2 (27.3)	81.1 (27.3)	77.5 (25.3)	69.3 (20.7)	60.1 (15.6)	54.3 (12.4)	67.7 (19.8)
Mean daily minimum °F (°C)	40.2 (4.6)	43.6 (6.4)	48.4 (9.1)	54.8 (12.7)	62.4 (16.9)	69.5 (20.8)	71.5 (21.9)	71.6 (22.0)	67.9 (19.9)	58.1 (14.5)	48.6 (9.2)	43.0 (6.1)	56.7 (13.7)
Mean minimum °F (°C)	23.8 (−4.6)	26.6 (−3.0)	31.8 (−0.1)	38.9 (3.8)	50.3 (10.2)	61.5 (16.4)	66.3 (19.1)	66.0 (18.9)	56.7 (13.7)	41.6 (5.3)	32.1 (0.1)	25.3 (−3.7)	19.8 (−6.8)
Record low °F (°C)	5 (−15)	14 (−10)	19 (−7)	33 (1)	43 (6)	52 (11)	61 (16)	58 (14)	42 (6)	30 (−1)	16 (−9)	7 (−14)	5 (−15)
Average precipitation inches (mm)	4.92 (125)	3.84 (98)	5.06 (129)	2.91 (74)	2.66 (68)	7.62 (194)	6.17 (157)	6.57 (167)	3.96 (101)	3.29 (84)	2.32 (59)	3.45 (88)	52.77 (1,340)
Average precipitation days (≥ 0.01 in)	9.0	7.9	7.4	6.2	6.1	11.6	12.8	12.9	8.4	4.8	5.2	7.4	99.7
Source: NOAA (mean maxima/minima 1981–2010)

== Demographics ==
Historical population
Census	Pop.	Note	%±
1860	423		—
1870	924		118.4%
1880	756		−18.2%
1890	781		3.3%
1900	849		8.7%
1910	1,560		83.7%
1920	1,952		25.1%
1930	2,189		12.1%
1940	2,730		24.7%
1950	3,150		15.4%
1960	3,239		2.8%
1970	3,737		15.4%
1980	3,487		−6.7%
1990	3,345		−4.1%
2000	3,061		−8.5%
2010	2,843		−7.1%
2020	2,912		2.4%
U.S. Decennial Census

=== Racial and ethnic composition ===
Madison city, Florida – Racial and ethnic composition Note: the US Census treats Hispanic/Latino as an ethnic category. This table excludes Latinos from the racial categories and assigns them to a separate category. Hispanics/Latinos may be of any race.
Race / Ethnicity (NH = Non-Hispanic)	Pop 2000	Pop 2010	Pop 2020	% 2000	% 2010	% 2020
White alone (NH)	1,054	863	840	34.43%	30.36%	28.85%
Black or African American alone (NH)	1,896	1,869	1,849	61.94%	65.74%	63.50%
Native American or Alaska Native alone (NH)	3	11	13	0.10%	0.39%	0.45%
Asian alone (NH)	15	19	12	0.49%	0.67%	0.41%
Native Hawaiian or Pacific Islander alone (NH)	1	0	0	0.03%	0.00%	0.00%
Other race alone (NH)	1	1	4	0.03%	0.04%	0.14%
Mixed race or Multiracial (NH)	25	41	82	0.82%	1.44%	2.82%
Hispanic or Latino (any race)	66	39	112	2.16%	1.37%	3.85%
Total	3,061	2,843	2,912	100.00%	100.00%	100.00%

=== 2020 census ===
As of the 2020 census, Madison had a population of 2,912. The median age was 36.1 years. 26.3% of residents were under the age of 18 and 18.4% of residents were 65 years of age or older. For every 100 females there were 81.4 males, and for every 100 females age 18 and over there were 74.8 males age 18 and over.

As of 2020, 0.0% of residents lived in urban areas, while 100.0% lived in rural areas.

In 2020, there were 1,200 households in Madison, of which 32.6% had children under the age of 18 living in them. Of all households, 25.7% were married-couple households, 19.2% were households with a male householder and no spouse or partner present, and 51.3% were households with a female householder and no spouse or partner present. About 37.7% of all households were made up of individuals and 15.6% had someone living alone who was 65 years of age or older.

In 2020, there were 1,452 housing units, of which 17.4% were vacant. The homeowner vacancy rate was 3.7% and the rental vacancy rate was 10.2%.

The U.S. Census Bureau's 2020 American Community Survey 5-year estimates reported 556 families residing in the city.

=== 2010 census ===
As of the 2010 United States census, there were 2,843 people, 1,237 households, and 696 families residing in the city.

=== 2000 census ===
As of the census of 2000, there were 3,061 people, 1,227 households, and 764 families residing in the city. The population density was 1,209.7 inhabitants per square mile (467.1/km^{2}). There were 1,395 housing units at an average density of 551.3 per square mile (212.9/km^{2}). The racial makeup of the city was 35.74% White, 62.43% African American, 0.10% Native American, 0.49% Asian, 0.03% Pacific Islander, 0.29% from other races, and 0.91% from two or more races. Hispanic or Latino of any race were 2.16% of the population.

In 2000, there were 1,227 households, out of which 30.8% had children under the age of 18 living with them, 31.6% were married couples living together, 27.2% had a female householder with no husband present, and 37.7% were non-families. 33.0% of all households were made up of individuals, and 16.2% had someone living alone who was 65 years of age or older. The average household size was 2.44 and the average family size was 3.13.

In 2000, in the city, the population was spread out, with 29.1% under the age of 18, 10.7% from 18 to 24, 24.9% from 25 to 44, 19.0% from 45 to 64, and 16.3% who were 65 years of age or older. The median age was 32 years. For every 100 females, there were 83.4 males. For every 100 females age 18 and over, there were 77.6 males.

In 2000, the median income for a household in the city was $17,656, and the median income for a family was $22,988. Males had a median income of $24,101 versus $23,750 for females. The per capita income for the city was $10,041. About 37.0% of families and 39.9% of the population were below the poverty line, including 49.2% of those under age 18 and 28.9% of those age 65 or over.

== Government ==
Madison has the city manager-council form of government. City commissioners are elected from districts and serve for four years. The commission appoints the city manager and city clerk; a mayor-commissioner serves a one-year term. The City of Madison has a 14 officer police department, and a 9 firefighter fire department.

The 2008–2009 millage rate is 6.0484. The General Fund Budget is $7,344,592. Emphasis is placed on public safety, primarily expanding the Fire Department full-time personnel to implement a 24/48 hour, 3 shift coverage. In addition, the city plans to address abandoned and rundown property issues.

== Education ==
Madison is served by two campuses of the District School Board of Madison County, Madison County Central School (PK–8) and Madison County High School.

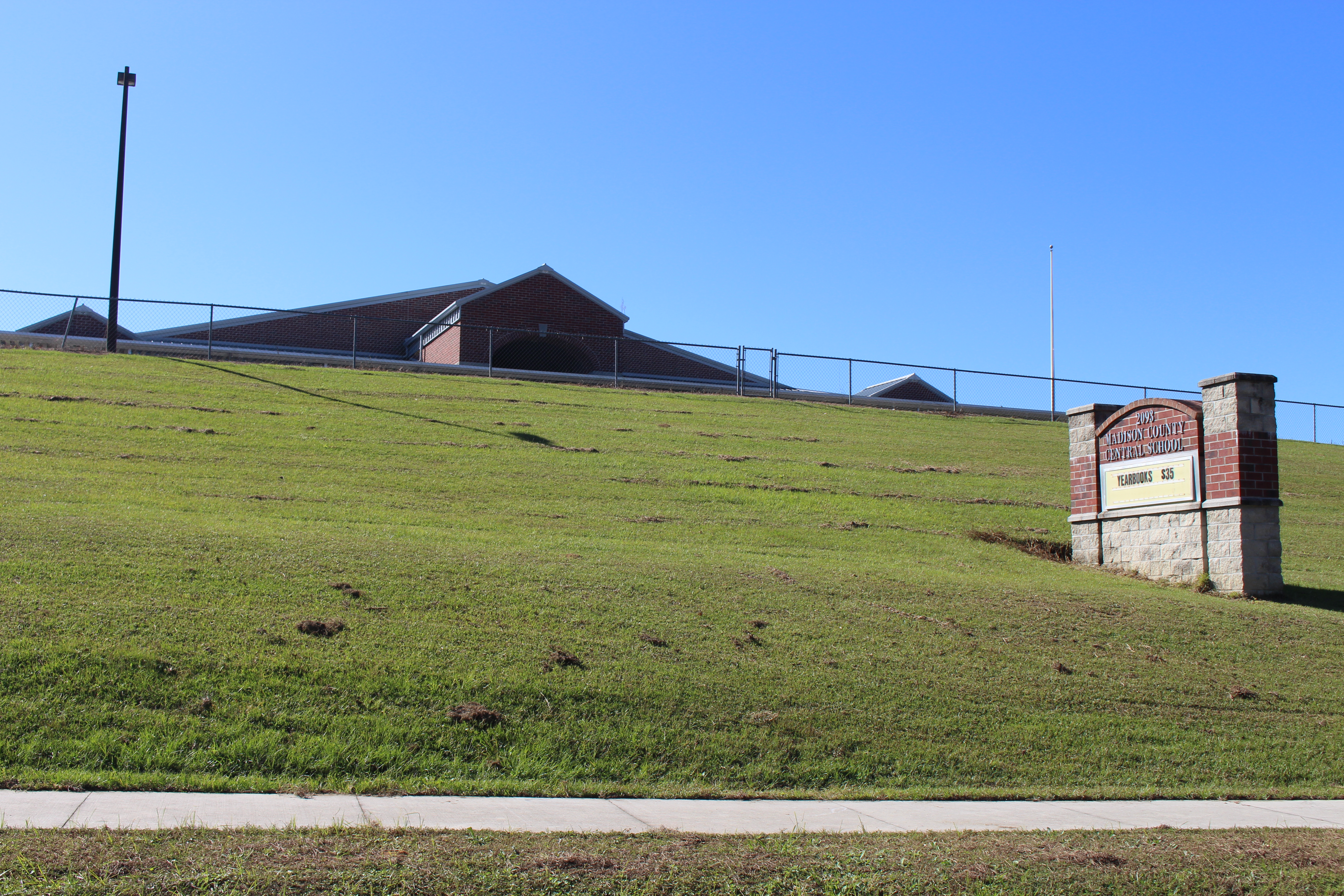
Madison County Central School

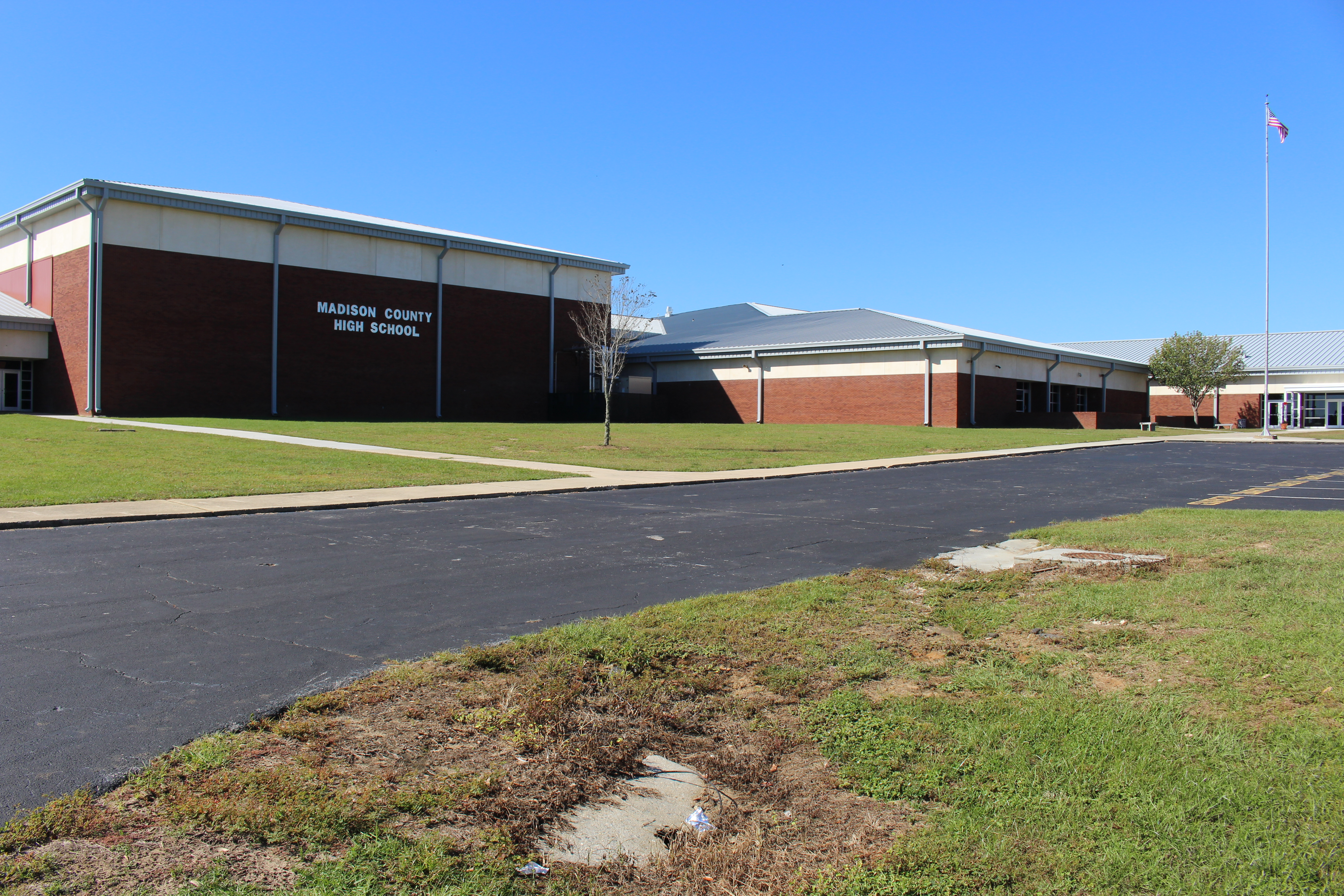
Madison County High School

Two high performing charter schools are available and are as follows:

- Madison Creative Arts Academy (K-8)
- James Madison Preparatory High School (9-12)

North Florida College provides post-secondary instruction for six counties (Hamilton, Jefferson, Lafayette, Madison, Suwannee, and Taylor). In addition, St. Leo University provides university instruction at the junior-senior level.

== Media ==
Area newspapers published by Greene Publishing are Madison County Carrier and The Madison Enterprise Recorder.

== Transportation ==
Madison is served by Madison Shuttle, a bus route operated by Big Bend Transit.

Freight service is provided by the Florida Gulf & Atlantic Railroad, which acquired most of the former CSX main line from Pensacola to Jacksonville on June 1, 2019.

It used to have an Amtrak Station as part of the Sunset Limited.

== Notable people ==
- LeGarrette Blount, NFL running back
- Lorenzo Cain, MLB player
- Geno Hayes, NFL linebacker
- Colin Kelly, World War II hero who was the first American B-17 to be shot down in combat on December 10, 1941
- Scott Kelly, politician
- Jacobbi McDaniel, NFL defensive tackle
- Scott Phillips, drummer for the band Creed
- Jesse Solomon, NFL linebacker
- Ernest Thomas, one of the Groveland Four, killed by a sheriff's posse in 1949, exonerated in 2021
- Chris Thompson, NFL running back
- Don Williams, NASCAR stock car driver
