= 1992 United States presidential election in Florida =

- November 3, 1992
- Turnout: ▲83%
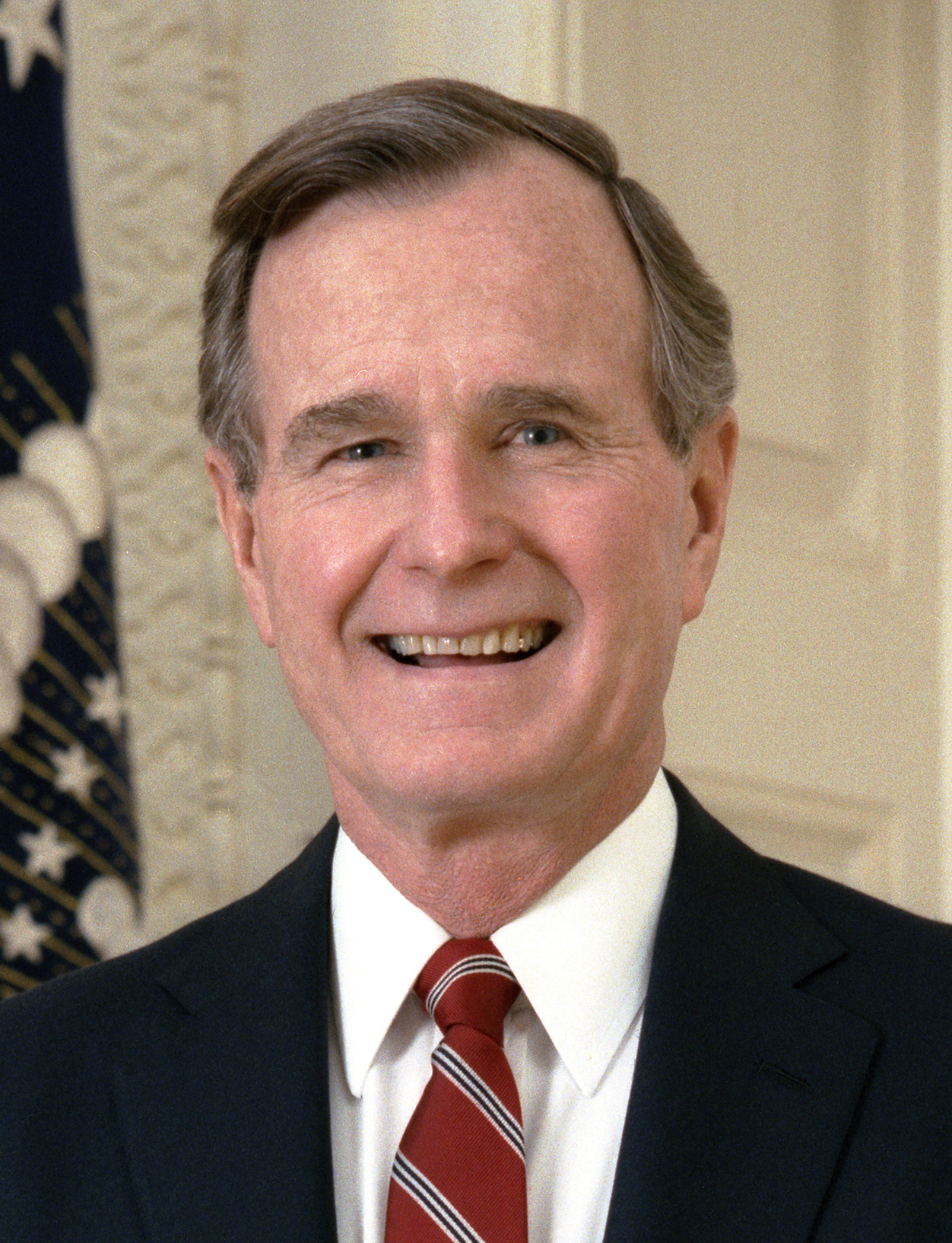

Nominee	George H. W. Bush	Bill Clinton	Ross Perot
Party	Republican	Democratic	Independent
Home state	Texas	Arkansas	Texas
Running mate	Dan Quayle	Al Gore	James Stockdale
Electoral vote	25	0	0
Popular vote	2,173,310	2,072,698	1,053,067
Percentage	40.89%	39.00%	19.82%

Bush
30–40%
40–50%
50–60%
60–70%
70–80%
80–90%
90–100%
Clinton
30–40%
40–50%
50–60%
60–70%
70–80%
80–90%
90–100%
Perot
30–40%
40–50%
50–60%
60–70%
90–100%
Tie/no votes
President before election
George H. W. Bush
Republican
Elected President
Bill Clinton
Democratic

The 1992 United States presidential election in Florida took place on November 3, 1992, as part of the 1992 United States presidential election.

== Background ==
Following World War II, the Democratic presidential nominee had only won Florida in 1948, 1964, and 1976.

Florida gained four seats in the United States House of Representatives as a result of the 1990 United States census.

== Primary ==
=== Democratic ===
Florida was the only southern state on Super Tuesday where Bill Clinton received less than 60% of the vote. Paul Tsongas spent $500,000 on television ads.

1992 Florida Democratic presidential primary results
Candidate	Vote Received	
Candidate	#	%
Bill Clinton	554,861	50.8%
Paul Tsongas	379,572	34.7%
Jerry Brown	133,156	12.2%
Tom Harkin	13,302	1.2%
Bob Kerrey	11,557	1.1%
Total	1,092,448	100%

=== Republican ===
1992 Florida Republican presidential primary results
Candidate	Vote received	
Candidate	#	%
George H.W. Bush (incumbent)	607,522	68.1%
Pat Buchanan	285,074	31.9%
Total	892,596	100%

== General ==
Jack Gargan formed Throw the Hypocritical Rascals Out in May 1991, and he helped form the movement to draft Ross Perot. Over 230,000 signatures were collected and Perot was qualified to appear on the ballot on May 27, 1992.

Bush won by about 100,000 votes, marking the first time Florida had backed the losing candidate since 1960, when it voted for Richard Nixon over John F. Kennedy. This was also the last time until the 2020 election that Florida would back the loser of the presidential election as well only the second time since 1924. Despite Bush's narrow victory, this election marked the start of Florida's transition from a strong GOP state into a closely divided swing state for future presidential elections; just four years earlier Bush had carried Florida by 22 points, making it his second-best state in the South. Florida was one of five states that gave Perot more than 1 million votes, including California, Texas, New York, and Ohio.

Clinton flipped the heavily populated South Florida counties of Palm Beach, Broward, and Miami-Dade, which had all voted for Bush in 1988, into the Democratic column, and they remained reliable Democratic bastions in the state until the early 2020s, buoying Democratic base support in the state. Clinton's victory in Palm Beach County was noteworthy in as much as that county had not previously backed a Democratic presidential nominee since Florida's "Solid South" days when Franklin D. Roosevelt swept all sixty-seven counties in 1944. Pinellas County voted Democratic for the first time since 1964. This was the last time St. Lucie County voted for a Republican presidential candidate until 2016.

Democratic U.S. Senator Bob Graham won reelection in the concurrent U.S. Senate election. The Republicans gained three seats in the Florida House of Representatives and one seat in the Florida Senate.

== Results ==
United States presidential election in Florida, 1992
Party	Candidate	Votes	Percentage	Electoral votes
Republican	George H. W. Bush (incumbent)	2,173,310	40.89%	25
Democratic	Bill Clinton	2,072,698	39.00%	0
Independent	Ross Perot	1,053,067	19.82%	0
Libertarian	Andre Marrou	15,079	0.28%	0
Write-Ins		238	0.00%	0
Totals		5,314,392	100.0%	25

Perot performance by county 5–10% 10–15% 15–20% 20–25%

=== Results by county ===
County	George H.W. Bush Republican		Bill Clinton Democratic		Ross Perot Independent		Various candidates Other parties		Margin		Total votes cast
County	#	%	#	%	#	%	#	%	#	%	Total votes cast
Alachua	22,813	29.87%	37,888	49.61%	15,296	20.03%	375	0.49%	-15,075	-19.74%	76,372
Baker	3,418	50.59%	1,976	29.25%	1,315	19.46%	47	0.70%	1,442	21.34%	6,756
Bay	22,842	49.99%	12,846	28.12%	9,712	21.26%	289	0.63%	9,996	21.87%	45,689
Bradford	3,672	44.02%	3,041	36.46%	1,574	18.87%	54	0.65%	631	7.56%	8,341
Brevard	84,585	43.19%	61,091	31.19%	49,509	25.28%	675	0.34%	23,494	12.00%	195,860
Broward	164,832	30.92%	276,361	51.85%	90,937	17.06%	920	0.17%	-111,529	-20.93%	533,050
Calhoun	1,721	37.58%	1,665	36.36%	1,176	25.68%	17	0.37%	56	1.22%	4,579
Charlotte	24,311	39.17%	22,907	36.91%	14,720	23.72%	126	0.20%	1,404	2.26%	62,064
Citrus	16,412	36.68%	15,937	35.62%	12,314	27.52%	83	0.19%	475	1.06%	44,746
Clay	26,360	57.95%	10,610	23.33%	8,423	18.52%	92	0.20%	15,750	34.62%	45,485
Collier	38,448	53.44%	18,796	26.13%	14,518	20.18%	182	0.25%	19,652	27.31%	71,944
Columbia	6,492	43.41%	5,528	36.97%	2,906	19.43%	28	0.19%	964	6.44%	14,954
DeSoto	3,070	41.32%	2,646	35.62%	1,687	22.71%	26	0.35%	424	5.70%	7,429
Dixie	1,401	32.04%	1,855	42.42%	1,094	25.02%	23	0.53%	-454	-10.38%	4,373
Duval	123,631	49.47%	92,098	36.85%	33,388	13.36%	809	0.32%	31,533	12.62%	249,926
Escambia	52,868	50.24%	32,045	30.45%	19,923	18.93%	385	0.37%	20,823	19.79%	105,221
Flagler	6,246	38.19%	6,693	40.92%	3,390	20.73%	26	0.16%	-447	-2.73%	16,355
Franklin	1,664	37.99%	1,535	35.05%	1,144	26.12%	37	0.84%	129	2.94%	4,380
Gadsden	3,975	27.62%	8,486	58.96%	1,871	13.00%	62	0.43%	-4,511	-31.34%	14,394
Gilchrist	1,395	34.73%	1,511	37.62%	1,090	27.13%	21	0.52%	-116	-2.89%	4,017
Glades	1,185	35.12%	1,305	38.68%	878	26.02%	6	0.18%	-120	-3.56%	3,374
Gulf	2,651	45.29%	1,938	33.11%	1,245	21.27%	20	0.34%	713	12.18%	5,854
Hamilton	1,402	37.64%	1,622	43.54%	695	18.66%	6	0.16%	-220	-5.90%	3,725
Hardee	2,900	45.08%	2,018	31.37%	1,499	23.30%	16	0.25%	882	13.71%	6,433
Hendry	3,279	40.91%	2,691	33.57%	2,032	25.35%	14	0.17%	588	7.34%	8,016
Hernando	17,902	36.47%	19,174	39.06%	11,848	24.14%	162	0.33%	-1,272	-2.59%	49,086
Highlands	14,499	44.76%	11,237	34.69%	6,593	20.35%	62	0.19%	3,262	10.07%	32,391
Hillsborough	130,643	42.07%	115,282	37.13%	63,054	20.31%	1,523	0.49%	15,361	4.94%	310,502
Holmes	3,196	48.96%	1,877	28.75%	1,427	21.86%	28	0.43%	1,319	20.21%	6,528
Indian River	19,140	43.54%	12,360	28.12%	12,375	28.15%	87	0.20%	6,765 (Note: In this county where Perot ran ahead of Clinton, margin given is Bush vote minus Perot vote and percentage margin Bush percentage minus Perot percentage.)	15.39%	43,962
Jackson	6,725	45.82%	5,482	37.35%	2,450	16.69%	19	0.13%	1,243	8.47%	14,676
Jefferson	1,506	32.19%	2,271	48.55%	895	19.13%	6	0.13%	-765	-16.36%	4,678
Lafayette	1,039	41.15%	867	34.34%	612	24.24%	7	0.28%	172	6.81%	2,525
Lake	30,825	44.17%	23,200	33.24%	15,614	22.37%	148	0.21%	7,625	10.93%	69,787
Lee	73,436	44.24%	53,660	32.32%	38,452	23.16%	454	0.27%	19,776	11.92%	166,002
Leon	31,983	32.87%	47,791	49.12%	17,212	17.69%	308	0.32%	-15,808	-16.25%	97,294
Levy	3,796	34.71%	4,330	39.59%	2,784	25.46%	26	0.24%	-534	-4.88%	10,936
Liberty	1,126	43.71%	820	31.83%	617	23.95%	13	0.50%	306	11.88%	2,576
Madison	2,007	34.38%	2,648	45.36%	1,174	20.11%	9	0.15%	-641	-10.98%	5,838
Manatee	42,725	42.63%	33,841	33.77%	23,290	23.24%	364	0.36%	8,884	8.86%	100,220
Marion	35,442	40.74%	30,829	35.44%	20,529	23.60%	189	0.22%	4,613	5.30%	86,989
Martin	24,800	46.63%	14,802	27.83%	13,442	25.27%	140	0.26%	9,998	18.80%	53,184
Miami-Dade	235,313	43.19%	254,609	46.73%	54,003	9.91%	918	0.17%	-19,296	-3.54%	544,843
Monroe	9,898	34.38%	10,450	36.30%	8,314	28.88%	127	0.44%	-552	-1.92%	28,789
Nassau	9,367	51.54%	5,503	30.28%	3,255	17.91%	49	0.27%	3,864	21.26%	18,174
Okaloosa	32,818	53.13%	12,038	19.49%	16,671	26.99%	242	0.39%	16,147	26.14%	61,769
Okeechobee	3,298	35.20%	3,418	36.48%	2,647	28.25%	7	0.07%	-120	-1.28%	9,370
Orange	108,788	45.90%	82,683	34.89%	44,844	18.92%	696	0.29%	26,105	11.01%	237,011
Osceola	19,143	42.29%	15,010	33.16%	11,021	24.35%	93	0.21%	4,133	9.13%	45,267
Palm Beach	140,350	34.63%	187,869	46.36%	76,243	18.81%	789	0.19%	-47,519	-11.73%	405,251
Pasco	47,735	35.11%	53,130	39.08%	34,654	25.49%	443	0.33%	-5,395	-3.97%	135,962
Pinellas	159,121	37.63%	160,528	37.96%	101,257	23.95%	1,945	0.46%	-1,407	-0.33%	422,851
Polk	65,963	45.21%	51,450	35.26%	28,204	19.33%	283	0.19%	14,513	9.95%	145,900
Putnam	8,910	34.72%	10,709	41.73%	5,979	23.30%	63	0.25%	-1,799	-7.01%	25,661
St. Johns	20,188	50.49%	12,291	30.74%	7,400	18.51%	107	0.27%	7,897	19.75%	39,986
St. Lucie	24,400	35.76%	23,876	34.99%	19,817	29.04%	140	0.21%	524	0.77%	68,233
Santa Rosa	17,339	52.90%	6,556	20.00%	8,788	26.81%	94	0.29%	8,551	26.09%	32,777
Sarasota	66,855	42.76%	54,552	34.89%	34,289	21.93%	656	0.42%	12,303	7.87%	156,352
Seminole	57,101	48.57%	35,660	30.33%	24,487	20.83%	312	0.27%	21,441	18.24%	117,560
Sumter	4,366	35.41%	5,027	40.77%	2,901	23.53%	35	0.28%	-661	-5.36%	12,329
Suwannee	4,576	40.23%	3,988	35.06%	2,791	24.54%	19	0.17%	588	5.17%	11,374
Taylor	2,693	37.34%	2,568	35.60%	1,929	26.74%	23	0.32%	125	1.74%	7,213
Union	1,546	43.29%	1,248	34.95%	770	21.56%	7	0.20%	298	8.34%	3,571
Volusia	59,172	38.05%	65,223	41.94%	30,823	19.82%	281	0.18%	-6,051	-3.89%	155,499
Wakulla	2,586	38.52%	2,320	34.55%	1,790	26.66%	18	0.27%	266	3.97%	6,714
Walton	5,726	42.25%	3,888	28.69%	3,890	28.70%	50	0.37%	1,836	13.55%	13,554
Washington	3,695	46.94%	2,544	32.32%	1,596	20.28%	36	0.46%	1,151	14.62%	7,871
Totals	2,173,310	40.89%	2,072,698	39.00%	1,053,067	19.82%	15,317	0.29%	100,612	1.89%	5,314,392

Counties that flipped from Republican to Democratic

- Alachua
- Broward
- Dixie
- Flagler
- Gilchrist
- Glades
- Hamilton
- Hernando
- Jefferson
- Leon
- Levy
- Madison
- Miami-Dade
- Monroe
- Okeechobee
- Palm Beach
- Pasco
- Pinellas
- Putnam
- Sumter
- Volusia

=== Results by congressional district ===
Bush carried 13 of the 23 congressional districts.

District	Clinton	Bush	Perot
1st	25.7%	51.1%	23.1%
2nd	41.9%	38.6%	19.5%
3rd	57%	30%	13%
4th	30.2%	53.2%	16.6%
5th	41.6%	34.2%	24.2%
6th	31.3%	47.3%	21.4%
7th	34.4%	44.7%	21%
8th	32.3%	47.6%	20.1%
9th	34.2%	41.4%	24.6%
10th	40%	36.2%	23.8%
11th	41.1%	39.2%	19.7%
12th	34.4%	45.6%	20%
13th	34.7%	42.8%	22.5%
14th	31.3%	46.1%	22.5%
15th	30.9%	43.4%	25.7%
16th	35.7%	39.4%	24.9%
17th	73.5%	19.1%	7.3%
18th	32.8%	56.9%	10.3%
19th	53.8%	30.3%	15.9%
20th	46.9%	33.6%	19.6%
21st	31.2%	58.2%	10.6%
22nd	45%	37.6%	17.4%
23rd	62.3%	23.2%	14.5%
Total	100%	100%	100%

== Works cited ==
- Steed, Robert; Moreland, Laurence; Baker, Tod, eds. (1994). The 1992 Presidential Election in the South: Current Patterns of Southern Party and Electoral Politics. Praeger Publishers. ISBN 0275945340.
