= List of county roads in Dixie County, Florida =

- County road shields used in Florida

Highway names
- Interstates: Interstate X (I-X)
- US Highways: U.S. Highway X (US X)
- State: State Road X (SR X)
- County: County Road X (CR X)

System links
- County roads in Florida; County roads in Dixie County

The following is a list of county roads in Dixie County, Florida. All county roads are maintained by the county in which they reside, however not all of them are marked with standard MUTCD approved county road shields.

== List of County Roads in Dixie County, Florida ==
#	Road Name(s)	Direction and Termini					Notes
CR 55A		W/E	US 19 / US 27 Alt. / US 98 / NE 300 Street	Eugene	US 19 / US 27 Alt. / US 98	Southeast of Old Town	Former SR 55A
CR 317		S/N	Hinton Landing	South-southeast of Old Town	US 19 / US 27 Alt. / US 98	Southeast of Old Town	Former SR 317
CR 340		W/E	SR 349 / NE 910 Avenue	South-southwest of Branford	CR 340	Gilchrist County line south of Branford	Former SR 340
CR 346A		W/E	CR 349 / SE 203 Avenue	South-southwest of Old Town	CR 317	South-southeast of Old Town	Former SR 346A
CR 349		S/N	SE 195 Street	Suwannee	US 19 / US 27 Alt. / US 98 / SR 349	Old Town	Former SR 349
CR 351	Main Street	S/N	Dead end US 19 / US 27 Alt. / US 98 / SE 289 Street	Horseshoe Beach Cross City	US 19 / US 27 Alt. / US 98 SR 349	Cross City Fletcher	Former SR 351
CR 351A	SW 10 Street / NE 223 Avenue	S/N	CR 351	South-southwest of Cross City	CR 351	Cross City	Former SR 351A
CR 351U	NE 410 Avenue / NE 516 Avenue / NE 512 Avenue		SR 349	South of Fletcher	CR 351	Southwest of Fletcher	
CR 353		S/N	CR 351	Southwest of Fletcher	NE 816 Avenue	North-northeast of Fletcher	Former SR 353
CR 357		S/N	Dead end CR 358	North-northwest of Suwannee East of Jonesboro	CR 351 CR 357	Northeast of Horseshoe Beach Lafayette County line north-northeast of Jonesboro	Former SR 357
CR 358		W/E	SW 271 Avenue US 19 / US 27 Alt. / US 98	Stewart City Jonesboro	US 19 / US 27 Alt. / US 98 US 19 / US 27 Alt. / US 98 / CR 398	Jonesboro Northwest of Cross City	Former SR 358
CR 361		S/N	Dead end	South of Steinhatchee	CR 358	East of Jena	Former SR 361
CR 361B	Rocky Creek Road	S/N	CR 361		CR 358		
CR 398	SW 307 Avenue	S/N	SW 307 Avenue	West-northeast of Cross City	US 19 / US 27 Alt. / US 98 / CR 358	Northwest of Cross City	Former SR 398
CR 398A	SW 316 Avenue	W/E	CR 398	West-northwest of Cross City	US 19 / US 27 Alt. / US 98	Northwest of Cross City	Former SR 398A
