= Yellow Jacket, Florida =

Coordinates: 29°27′48″N 83°00′04″W

Yellow Jacket is an unincorporated community alongside the Suwanee River in Dixie County, Florida. It is home to the Yellow Jacket RV Resort and a boat ramp. Yellow Jacket borders the Lower Suwannee National Wildlife Refuge's 20 mile estuarian preserve along the Suwannee River that continues southwest to the Gulf Coast. Yellow Jacket is off County Road 349 south of Old Town, Florida. A succession of timber companies including Putnam Lumber Company have been active in the area around Yellow Jacket. Large yellow jacket nests have been found in this region of Florida including one pictured 4 miles north of Tennille, Florida in 1953.
