= Suwannee, Florida =

Unincorporated community in Dixie County, Florida, United States

Coordinates: 29°19′44″N 83°08′39″W

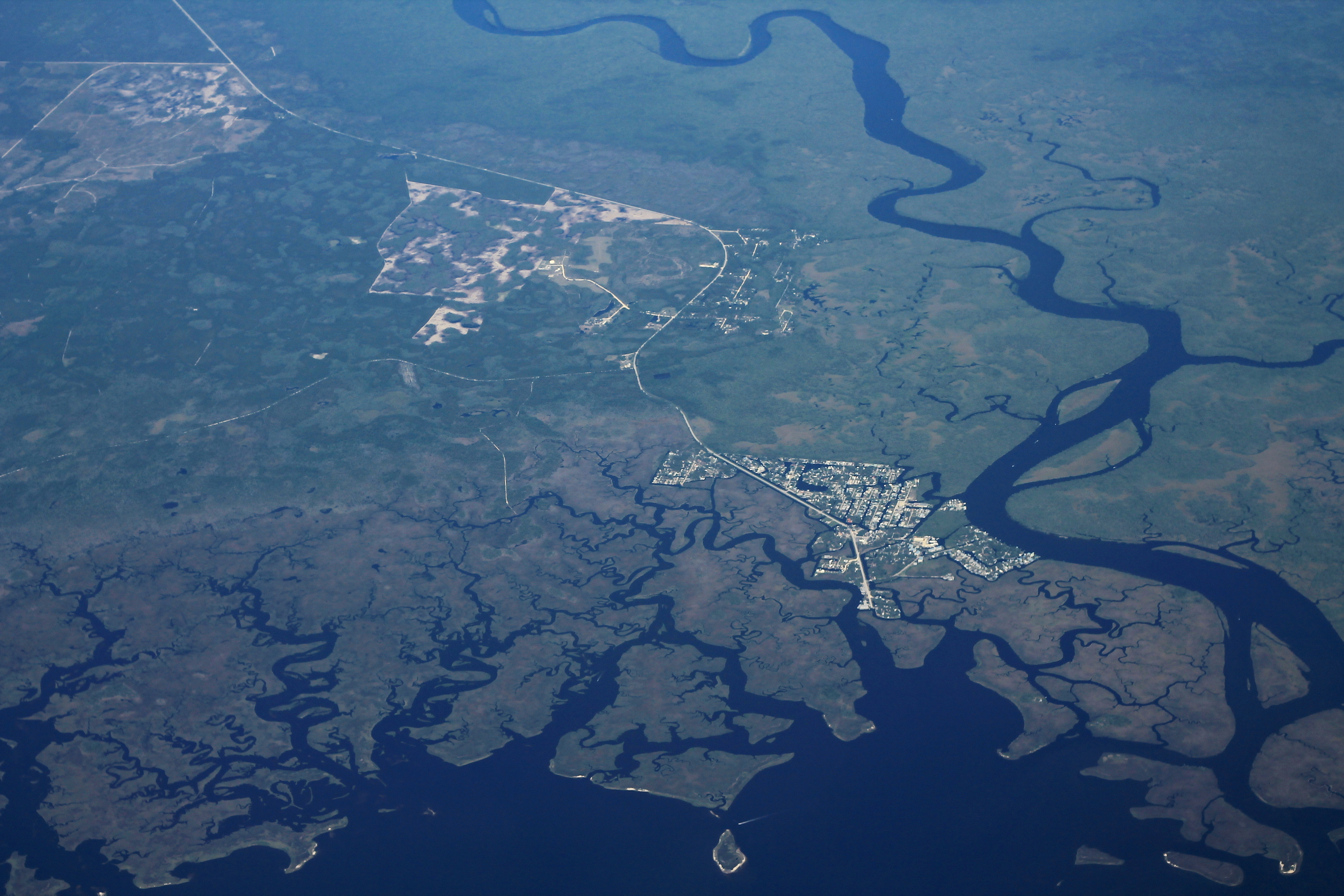
Aerial image of Suwannee

Suwannee is an unincorporated community in Dixie County, Florida, United States. It is located on the Suwannee River near its mouth, at the southern end of the Big Bend region of Florida. It is 23 miles southwest of Old Town, to which it is connected by County Road 349.

Suwannee is a fishing village, with a population of about 300. It caters for both freshwater fishing in the river and saltwater fishing in the Gulf of Mexico. During the 19th century, the area on which the town sits was an important staging ground for goods traveling to and from the cotton and tobacco plantations throughout the Suwannee Valley. The 1939 Florida guide notes that "small wood-burning sternwheelers of the Mississippi type plied the lower stretches of the Suwannee, carrying cotton, tobacco, peanuts, naval stores, and lumber from the interior to the high-masted schooners anchored at the river mouth. The Belle of the Suwannee, Captain Robert Bartlett commanding, was the queen of the fleet. During the war blockade runners traveled up and down the stream; several were burned and sunk, but many succeeded in eluding the Federal gunboats."

The town is surrounded by the Lower Suwannee National Wildlife Refuge. There is a canoe/kayak trail into the refuge from launch sites in the town.
