= 1994 Florida gubernatorial election =

- November 8, 1994
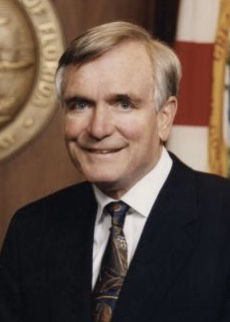

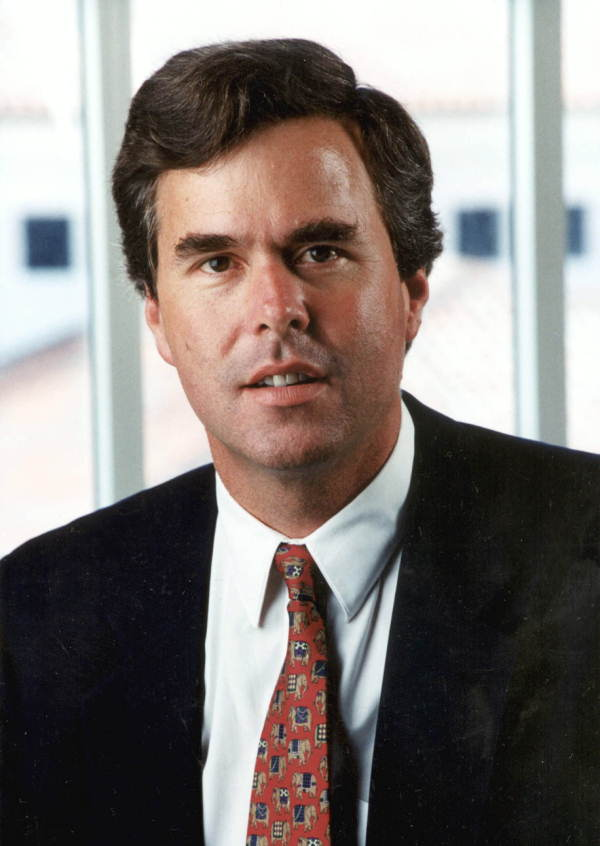
Nominee	Lawton Chiles	Jeb Bush
Party	Democratic	Republican
Running mate	Buddy MacKay	Tom Feeney
Popular vote	2,135,008	2,071,068
Percentage	50.75%	49.23%
- Chiles: 50–60% 60–70% 70–80% 80–90% >90% Bush: 50–60% 60–70% 70–80% 80–90% >90% Tie: 50% No votes
Governor before election
Lawton Chiles
Democratic
Elected Governor
Lawton Chiles
Democratic

The 1994 Florida gubernatorial election was held on November 8, 1994. Democratic incumbent Lawton Chiles was narrowly re-elected to a second term over Republican former Florida commerce secretary Jeb Bush. This race was the second-closest gubernatorial election in Florida history, after the 1876 election, due to the strong Republican wave of 1994. As of 2026, this is the last time a Democrat was elected governor of Florida.

Primary elections were held on September 8. Chiles dispatched a challenge from populist activist Jack Gargan to win the Democratic nomination. Bush won a plurality of the Republican primary vote, with particular strength in Dade County. Although Florida secretary of state James C. Smith finished second and was entitled to challenge Bush in a runoff election, he declined and Bush was certified as the Republican nominee.

== Background ==
Lawton Chiles was eligible to run for a second four-year term under the Constitution of Florida. In late 1991, Chiles's disapproval rating rose significantly after he cut funds for education in his first budget. Around 75 percent of Floridians gave him a fair or poor performance rating. The following year, Chiles's approval rating fell to only 22 percent after the perceptions that the state response to Hurricane Andrew was inadequate. His disapproval rating remained as high as 71 percent into 1993. As a result, some Democrats suggested that U.S. senator Bob Graham run for a third, non-consecutive term as governor.

== Democratic primary ==
=== Candidates ===
- Lawton Chiles, incumbent governor since 1991
  - Running mate: Buddy MacKay, incumbent lieutenant governor since 1991
- Jack Gargan, retired financial consultant and founder of THRO
  - Running mate: James H. King

==== Declined ====
- Bob Butterworth, Florida Attorney General
- Betty Castor, Education Commissioner of Florida
- Bill Frederick, former mayor of Orlando
- Bob Graham, U.S. senator and former governor
- Buddy MacKay, incumbent lieutenant governor since 1991

=== Results ===
Democratic Primary by county Chiles: 50–60%; 60–70%; 70–80%; 80–90%; Gargan: 50–60%

Democratic primary results
Party	Candidate	Votes	%
Democratic	Lawton Chiles (incumbent)	603,657	72.17%
Democratic	Jack Gargan	232,757	27.83%
Total votes		836,414	100.00%

== Republican primary ==
=== Candidates ===
- Josephine A. Arnold, Seminole County osteopathic neurologist and candidate for State Senate in 1992
  - Running mate: Bob Brown
- Bob Bell, Miami attorney
  - Running mate: George Roller
- Jeb Bush, Miami businessman, son of former president George Bush and former Florida commerce secretary
  - Running mate: Tom Feeney, state representative from Seminole County
- Kenneth L. Connor, attorney and former president of Florida Right to Life
  - Running mate: Mel Martinez, Orlando attorney and former president of the Association of Florida Trial Lawyers
- Ander Crenshaw, state senator from Jacksonville, son-in-law of Claude R. Kirk, and candidate for U.S. Senate in 1980
  - Running mate: Chester Clem, former state representative from Vero Beach and candidate for governor in 1986
- Tom Gallagher, Florida state treasurer and candidate for governor in 1982 and 1986
  - Running mate: Curt Kiser, state senator from Pinellas County
- Jim Smith, Florida secretary of state, former Florida attorney general and Democratic candidate for governor in 1986
  - Running mate: Barbara Sheen Todd, Pinellas County commissioner and president of the National Association of Counties

=== Campaign ===
Ander Crenshaw was dogged by campaign finance issues after his announcement, beginning with a rumor that his campaign had asked donors to postdate checks by months.

=== Polling ===
Poll source	Date(s) administered	Sample size	Margin of error	Jeb Bush	Ander Crenshaw	Ken Connor	Tom Gallagher	Jim Smith	Undecided
Mason-Dixon	October 7–10, 1993	301 (RV)	± 5.5%	19%	4%	1%	27%	10%	2%

=== Results ===
Republican Primary by county Bush: 30–40%; 40–50%; 50–60%; 70–80%; Smith: 40–50%

Republican primary results
Party	Candidate	Votes	%
Republican	Jeb Bush	411,680	45.68%
Republican	Jim Smith	165,869	18.40%
Republican	Tom Gallagher	117,067	12.99%
Republican	Ander Crenshaw	109,148	12.11%
Republican	Kenneth L. Connor	83,945	9.31%
Republican	Josephine A. Arnold	8,326	0.92%
Republican	Bob Bell	5,202	0.58%
Total votes		901,237	100.00%

A runoff primary election was scheduled to be held between leading candidate Jeb Bush and second-place candidate James C. Smith because no candidate received a majority of the vote. However, Smith dropped out of the race a few days later, leaving Bush as the Republican nominee for governor.

== General election ==
=== Candidates ===
- Jeb Bush, businessman, son of former President of the United States George H. W. Bush and former Florida Secretary of Commerce (Republican)
  - Running mate: Tom Feeney, state representative from Seminole County
- Lawton Chiles, incumbent Governor of Florida (Democratic)
  - Running mate: Buddy MacKay, incumbent lieutenant governor since 1991

==== Write-in candidates ====
- George "G. G." Boone, self-employed carpenter (Independent)
- Calvin "C. C." Reed, former trucking and moving industry worker (Independent)

=== Campaign ===
Bush ran as a political conservative and tried to paint Chiles as beholden to liberal interests. At one point, when asked what he would do for African Americans, Bush responded, "It's time to strive for a society where there's equality of opportunity, not equality of results. So I'm going to answer your question by saying: probably nothing."

The final weeks of the campaign was described as "one of the nastiest in Florida political history."

On the day before the election, the Chiles campaign called about 70,000 Floridians in a get out the vote effort. Their calls alleged that Bush was a "tax cheat" and that his running mate Tom Feeney planned to destroy Social Security, and the callers falsely attributed these claims to "tax fairness" and senior citizen advocacy organizations. Chiles denied authorizing the phone calls but still later apologized when the media discovered top officials in his campaign had authorized them. When the Florida legislature investigated the calls, Chiles claimed he was "out of the loop."

=== Polling ===
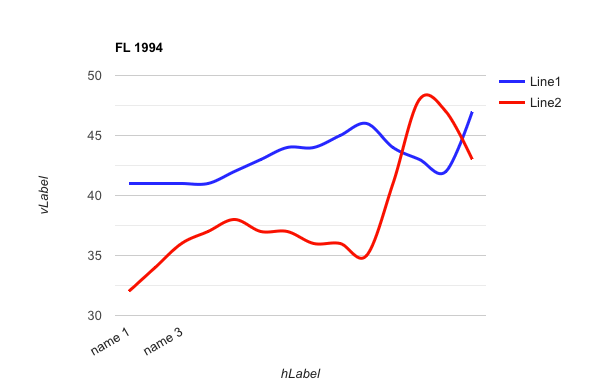
Polling for the 1994 Florida Gubernatorial Election

Opinion poll source	Date	Lawton Chiles (D)	Jeb Bush (R)
Associated Industries of Florida	Nov. 3-4, 1994	48%	43%
Mason-Dixon	Nov. 1-3, 1994	48%	45%
The New York Times	Oct. 30-Nov. 3, 1994	47%	41%
Orlando Sentinel	Nov. 1, 1994	48%	45%
Associated Industries of Florida	Oct. 30, 1994	45%	45%
St. Petersburg Times	Oct. 16, 1994	39%	49%
Mason-Dixon	Oct. 7, 1994	43%	48%
Mason-Dixon	Sep. 1-3, 1994	43%	48%
Mason-Dixon	Aug. 1-3, 1994	44%	41%
Mason-Dixon	July 1–3, 1994	46%	35%
Mason-Dixon	Feb. 1-3, 1994	42%	38%
Mason-Dixon	Oct. 1-3, 1993	41%	32%

=== Debates ===
1994 Florida gubernatorial debates
No.	Date	Host	Moderator	Link	Democratic	Republican
Key: P Participant A Absent N Not invited I Invited W Withdrawn						
Key: P Participant A Absent N Not invited I Invited W Withdrawn					Lawton Chiles	Jeb Bush
1	Oct. 4, 1994	WLRN-TV Miami Herald Florida Economic Development Council	David Lawrence John Anderson Jim Breitenseld Tom Fielder		P	P
2	Oct. 18, 1994	Politics in the Park	N/A		P	P
3	Nov. 1, 1994	NBC Florida affiliates League of Women Voters	Tim Russert		P	P

On October 18, a debate was broadcast by 36 radio stations from at Walt Disney World in Orlando. Bush and Chiles stood behind two lecterns decorated with Mickey Mouse ears.

On November 1, another debate between Bush and Chiles was conducted by the League of Women Voters of Florida at Tampa Performing Arts Center. Early in the debate, Chiles again criticized Bush's ad about the death penalty, stating that Bush had outdone his father's ad about Willie Horton and saying "You knew [the ad] was false. You admitted it was false. And I am ashamed that you would use the loss of a mother in an ad like this." Later, during a discussion about school vouchers, Chiles quipped "My mama told me, 'sticks and stones will break my bones,' but names will never hurt me. But let me tell you one other thing about the old liberal. The old He-Coon walks just before the light of day." This referenced Chiles' Florida cracker roots, and served as a deliberate contrast with the more urbane Bush.

=== Campaign finance ===
Throughout the campaign, Bush raised approximately $7 million, more than half of which came from fundraisers featuring his parents and out-of-state fundraisers sponsored by his family and friends. On each of Barbara and George H. W. Bush's visits to Florida, they raked in about $1 million for the campaign. Chiles limited contributions to $100 per person and raised $6.23 million, which included $2 million in public money.

=== Results ===
Chiles prevailed against Bush by about 1.52 percent of the vote. Amid the Republican Revolution of 1994, Chiles was one of two Democratic governors to win close races to hold their seat that night, along with Zell Miller of neighboring Georgia. However, Republicans gained control of the Florida Senate for the first time in over a century, U.S. senator Connie Mack III was reelected to a second term in a landslide, and Republicans won races for Secretary of State, Comptroller, and Commissioner of Education. A statewide ballot initiative to legalize casino gambling was defeated with only 38 percent of the vote.

In comparison with the 1990 election, Chiles performed significantly worse in North and Central Florida.

Florida gubernatorial election, 1994
Party	Candidate	Votes	%	±%
Democratic	Lawton Chiles (incumbent)	2,135,008	50.75%	−5.76%
Republican	Jeb Bush	2,071,068	49.23%	+5.75%
Write-in		583	0.0%	0%
Majority		63,940	1.52%	−11.51%
Turnout		4,206,659		
Democratic hold		Swing		

=== By county ===
Chiles again won with a "Dixie–Dade strategy," winning both rural, conservative Dixie County and urban Dade County, home of Miami. Chiles also carried the other two major urban South Florida counties, Broward and Palm Beach. Although he lost several counties in the Panhandle which he had won in 1990, including his native Polk County, Chiles' largest margin of victory was in Gadsden County, the only plurality African American county in Florida.

Bush received his highest shares of the vote in several northern rural counties, especially Baker, Clay, and Union counties.

County	Chiles%	Chiles#	Bush%	Bush#	Others%	Others#	Total#
Alachua	61.8%	35,030	38.2%	21,624	0%	7	56,661
Baker	31.5%	1,654	68.5%	3,600	0%	0	5,254
Bay	43.1%	17,816	56.9%	23,498	0%	2	41,316
Bradford	37.1%	2,642	62.9%	4,470	0%	0	7,112
Brevard	46.6%	72,393	53.4%	82,878	0%	6	155,277
Broward	65.4%	261,368	34.6%	138,333	0%	11	399,712
Calhoun	50.5%	1,811	49.5%	1,775	0%	0	3,586
Charlotte	46.3%	24,159	53.7%	27,965	0%	0	52,124
Citrus	49.3%	20,094	50.7%	20,633	0%	5	40,732
Clay	29.1%	9,986	70.9%	24,290	0%	1	34,276
Collier	38.6%	22,860	61.4%	36,370	0%	0	59,230
Columbia	41.6%	5,288	58.3%	7,408	0%	0	12,696
DeSoto	45.6%	2,856	54.4%	3,407	0%	0	6,263
Dixie	50.2%	2,003	49.7%	1,981	0%	5	3,989
Duval	42.5%	80,945	57.2%	108,900	0%	471	190,316
Escambia	42.2%	33,210	57.7%	45,261	0%	1	78,472
Flagler	52.6%	7,954	47.4%	7,160	0%	0	15,114
Franklin	66.6%	2,636	33.4%	1,324	0%	0	3,960
Gadsden	69.4%	7,751	30.6%	3,422	0%	0	11,173
Gilchrist	47.0%	1,701	53.0%	1,922	0%	0	3,623
Glades	51.4%	1,387	48.6%	1,310	0%	0	2,697
Gulf	56.7%	3,060	43.3%	2,339	0%	0	5,399
Hamilton	50.4%	1,453	49.6%	1,429	0%	0	2,882
Hardee	50.4%	2,695	49.6%	2,649	0%	1	5,345
Hendry	44.2%	2,623	55.8%	3,308	0%	0	5,931
Hernando	50.8%	25,331	49.2%	24,532	0%	0	49,863
Highlands	45.7%	12,323	54.3%	14,617	0%	1	26,940
Hillsborough	48.6%	117,974	51.4%	124,561	0%	11	242,546
Holmes	42.0%	2,134	58.0%	2,942	0%	0	5,076
Indian River	44.3%	16,410	55.7%	20,630	0%	0	37,040
Jackson	46.9%	5,907	53.1%	6,698	0%	0	12,605
Jefferson	61.3%	2,575	38.7%	1,625	0%	0	4,200
Lafayette	45.9%	936	54.1%	1,105	0%	0	2,041
Lake	49.5%	29,797	50.5%	30,394	0%	0	60,191
Lee	43.8%	58,785	56.2%	75,365	0%	0	134,150
Leon	63.4%	47,323	36.6%	27,265	0%	1	74,589
Levy	51.5%	4,588	48.5%	4,322	0%	0	8,910
Liberty	49.0%	947	51.0%	985	0%	0	1,932
Madison	54.3%	2,564	45.7%	2,161	0%	1	4,726
Manatee	49.1%	40,473	50.9%	41,915	0%	0	82,388
Marion	44.7%	31,345	55.3%	38,784	0%	1	70,129
Martin	45.1%	20,706	54.9%	25,239	0%	0	45,945
Miami-Dade	52.0%	215,276	48.0%	198,371	0%	1	413,648
Monroe	56.7%	13,232	43.3%	10,086	0%	1	23,319
Nassau	34.8%	5,331	65.2%	9,968	0%	0	15,299
Okaloosa	34.3%	16,459	65.7%	31,459	0%	0	47,918
Okeechobee	49.6%	3,492	50.4%	3,545	0%	0	7,037
Orange	48.0%	85,098	52.0%	92,096	0%	0	177,194
Osceola	45.3%	15,292	54.7%	18,437	0%	1	33,730
Palm Beach	61.3%	198,638	38.7%	125,208	0%	3	323,849
Pasco	52.4%	57,597	47.6%	52,418	0%	5	110,020
Pinellas	51.0%	166,858	49.0%	160,115	0%	7	326,980
Polk	47.9%	58,364	52.5%	65,415	0%	0	123,779
Putnam	39.8%	9,658	52.1%	10,505	0%	0	20,163
Santa Rosa	36.6%	11,726	63.4%	20,345	0%	4	32,075
Sarasota	47.4%	60,770	52.6%	67,531	0%	0	128,301
Seminole	44.3%	39,324	55.7%	49,387	0%	1	88,712
St. Johns	36.7%	12,791	63.3%	22,036	0%	0	34,827
St. Lucie	50.5%	27,956	49.5%	27,436	0%	0	55,392
Sumter	51.1%	5,603	48.9%	5,360	0%	1	10,964
Suwanee	43.7%	3,935	56.3%	5,064	0%	0	8,999
Taylor	49.6%	2,979	50.4%	3,024	0%	0	6,003
Union	28.2%	791	71.8%	2,009	0%	0	2,800
Volusia	53.2%	66,614	46.8%	58,632	0%	34	125,280
Wakulla	59.7%	3,696	40.3%	2,492	0%	0	6,188
Walton	43.8%	5,067	56.2%	6,493	0%	0	11,560
Washington	47.8%	2,968	52.2%	3,240	0%	0	6,208

== Aftermath ==
=== Phonegate ===
After the election, the controversial phone calls were labeled "Phonegate." Bill Cotterell of the Tallahassee Democrat believed that the phone calls did not affect the result of the election, arguing, "I'm quite sure you know, at least half of them just hung up, never even listened to the message. And those who did probably said, well, that's ridiculous, the governor of Florida ... or the lieutenant governor of Florida can't repeal Social Security." Miami Herald writer Mark Silva also argued that the phone calls did not impact the outcome of the election, saying, "[the] campaign was won before that happened. The idea that that somehow tipped the election was a canard, it wasn't true." In November 1995, Bush campaign manager Mac Stipanovich claimed, "[I]t's quite possible the Chiles campaign stole the election by fraud". Bush himself refused to speculate on the impact of the phone calls.

In December 1995, Chiles became the first modern Florida governor to testify under oath before a state legislative committee, the Senate Committee on Executive Business, Ethics, and Elections. Chiles testified that he had no knowledge of the calls and apologized to any Floridians who may have been misled. Eventually, the opposition to Chiles was reduced to state senator Charlie Crist. Later, the Republican legislature passed a law banning false attributions for get out the vote calls, which Chiles signed. Chiles remained governor until suffering a fatal heart attack on December 12, 1998, less than a month before his second term expired.

=== Impact on Bush's presidential ambitions ===
Bush had originally planned on running for president of the United States in 2000. However, because he lost this election while his brother, George W. Bush, was elected governor of Texas on the same night, George ran for president in 2000. Although Jeb Bush was elected governor in 1998 and easily reelected in 2002, his only campaign for president resulted in his defeat in the 2016 primaries by Donald Trump.
