= Old Town Elementary School =

Old Town Elementary School or variants thereof may refer to:

- Old Town Elementary School (Old Town, Florida)
- Old Town Elementary School (Round Rock, Texas)
