= Hines, Florida =

Unincorporated community in Florida, United States

Coordinates: 29.739°N 83.236°W

Hines is an unincorporated community in Dixie County, Florida. Prince Benjamin Oliver Sr., a long serving educator of African American descent, taught there early in his career. Hines is located in a remote and largely undeveloped area of the state along County Road 357 south of Steinhatchee Conservation Area and north of Cross City, Florida and US 19-98.
