= Old Town Methodist Church =

Church building in Florida, United States of America

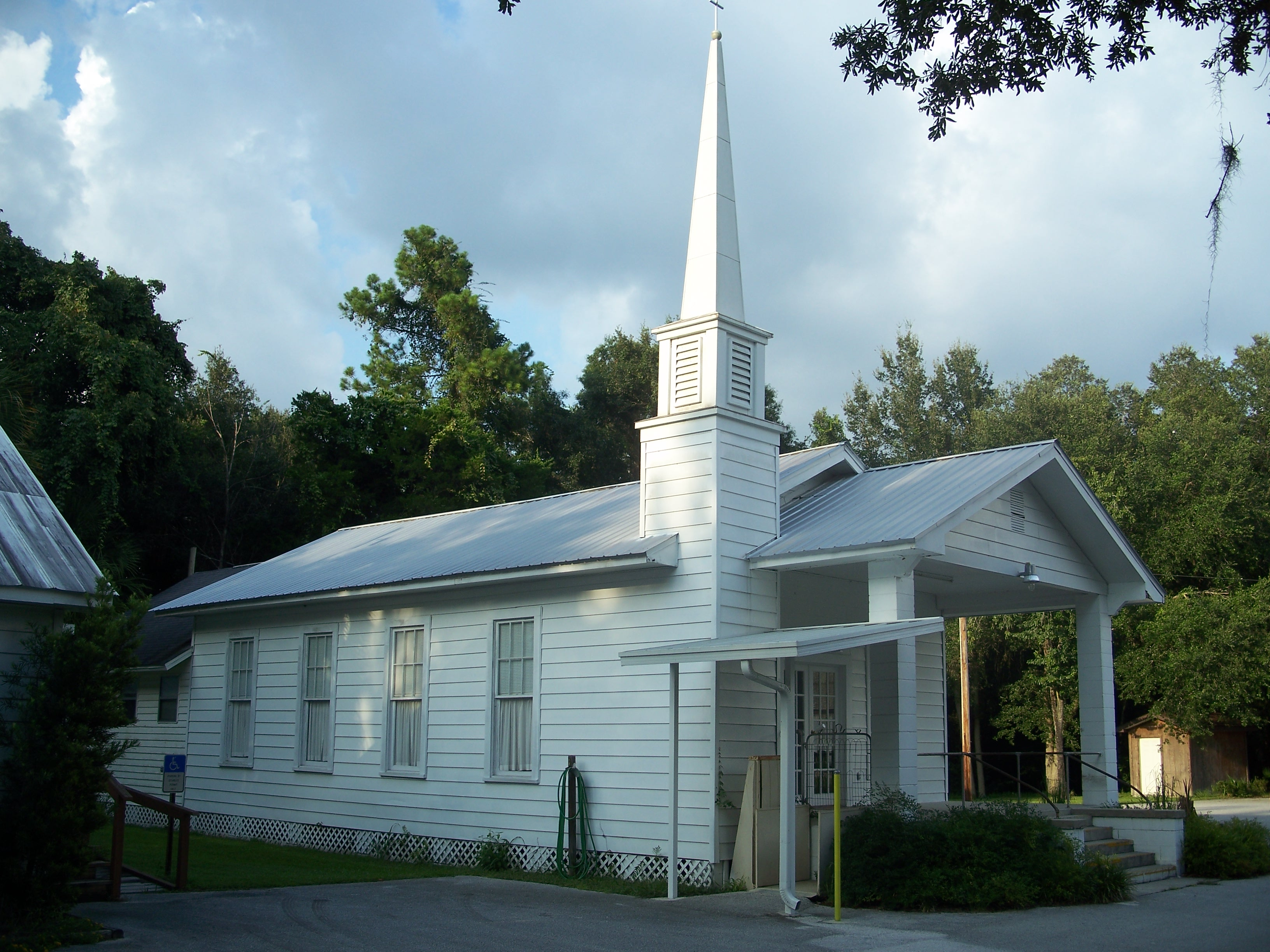
- Old Town Methodist Church
- Interactive map of the Old Town Methodist Church area

General information
- Architectural style: vernacular
- Location: Old Town, Florida, United States
- Coordinates: 29.60265°N 82.984596°W
- Construction started: 1890
- Completed: 1890
- Client: Old Town Methodist Church

Technical details
- Structural system: wooden

Design and construction
- Engineer: Builder: Ed Hill and Charlie Hill

The original Old Town Methodist Church, built in 1890, is an historic wooden Methodist church building now situated behind the Old Town United Methodist Church built in 1983 a short distance west of the intersection of U.S. 19 and Road 349 in Old Town, Florida. Built by Ed Hill and Charlie Hill at another location in Old Town, it has been moved several times before reaching its present site. In the 1980s, it was used as an annex to the new building. Today it serves as the Fellowship Hall.

In 1989, the 1890 church building was listed in A Guide to Florida's Historic Architecture, published by the University of Florida Press.
