= Florida State Road 349 =

State highway in Florida, United States

State Road 349
- SR 349 in red, CR 349 in blue

Route information
- Maintained by FDOT
- Length: 24.253 mi (39.031 km)

Major junctions
- South end: US 19 / US 27 Alt. / US 98 / CR 349 in Old Town
- North end: US 27 near Branford

Location
- Country: United States
- State: Florida
- Counties: Dixie, Lafayette

Highway system
- Florida State Highway System; Interstate; US; State; Former; Pre‑1945; Toll; Scenic
← SR 345	→ SR 359A

State Road 349 (SR 349) is a two-lane state highway in eastern Dixie and Lafayette counties, near the Suwannee River. It is 24 miles (39 km) long. Near Fletcher, it intersects County Road 351 (CR 351), a major access road to Cross City and Horseshoe Beach. The northern terminus at the intersection of U.S. Highway 27 (US 27) in Grady, which is on the west side of the Suwannee River near Branford. The southern terminus of SR 349 is at an intersection of US 19/US 27 Alternate/US 98 in Old Town, although it extends southward to Suwannee as CR 349.

== History ==
SR 349 was part of US 129 from 1948 to 1959, and US 129 Alternate from 1959 to 1970.

== Major intersections ==
County	Location	mi	km	Destinations	Notes
Dixie	Old Town	0.000	0.000	US 19 / US 27 Alt. / US 98 (SR 55) / CR 349 south – Suwannee, Chiefland, Cross City	
Dixie		7.357	11.840	CR 351A west (Northeast 512th Avenue)	
Dixie		10.193	16.404	CR 351 west	
Dixie		12.449	20.035	CR 353 south	
Dixie		13.993	22.520	CR 340 east	
Lafayette	Hatchbend	16.952	27.282	CR 500 east	Former SR 342
Lafayette	Hatchbend	19.809	31.879	CR 480 east	Former SR 342
Lafayette		24.253	39.031	US 27 (SR 20) – Mayo, Branford	
1.000 mi = 1.609 km; 1.000 km = 0.621 mi
