= Russ Verney =

American political advisor

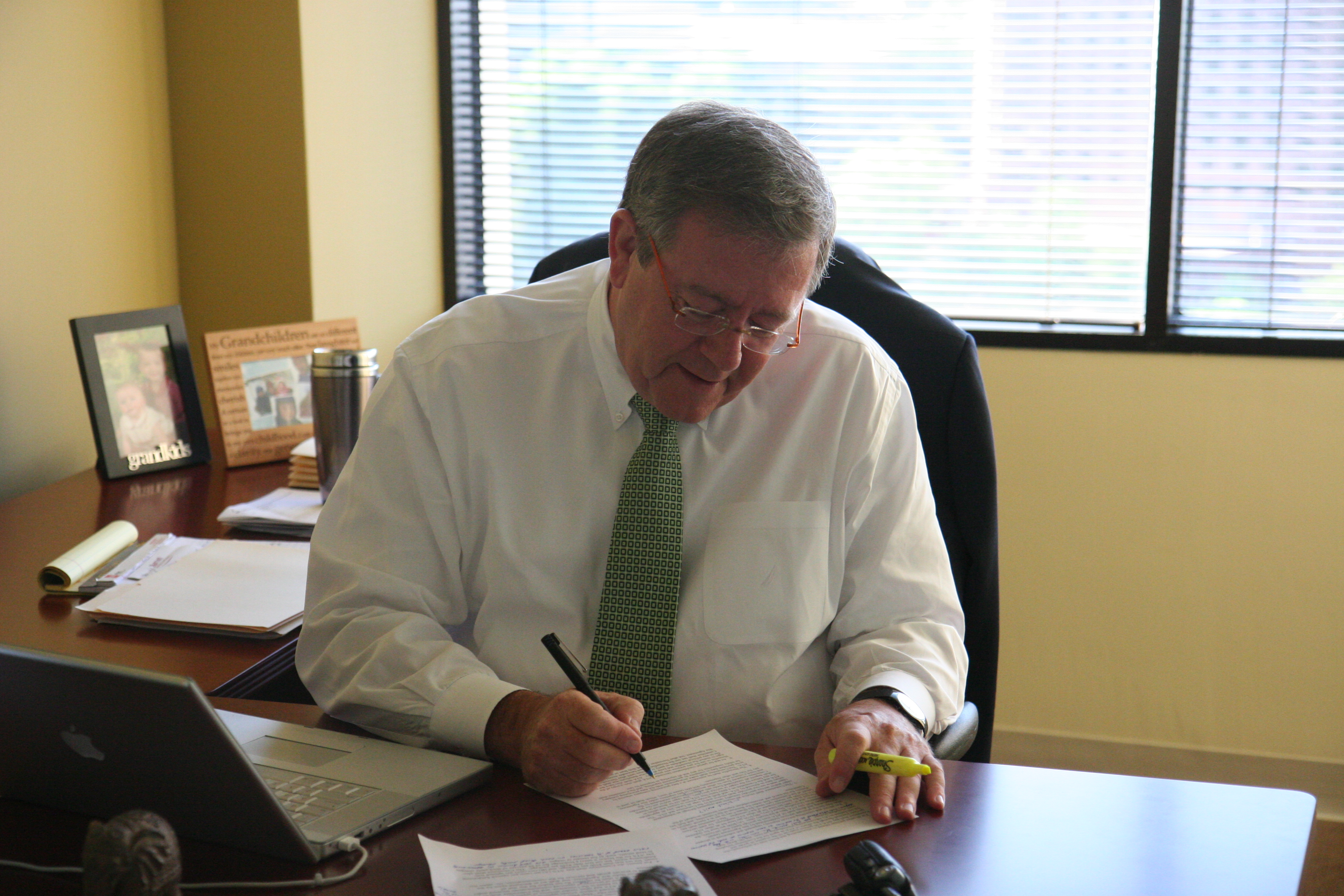
Russ Verney working as the campaign manager for Bob Barr's 2008 presidential campaign

Russell J. Verney is a political advisor, who served as chairman of the Reform Party of the United States from 1995 to 1999. He worked on the presidential campaigns of Ross Perot and Bob Barr.

== Career ==
=== 1990s ===
In the early 1990s, Verney served as the Democratic Party State Treasurer in New Hampshire. By 1992, he was the party's executive director for the state. Later that year, he joined Ross Perot's campaign and worked as the candidate's spokesman and top advisor, helping the candidate win 19% of the popular vote and participation in a three-way presidential debate. After the campaign, he served as a coordinator and spokesman for Perot's organization United We Stand America, which opposed the North American Free Trade Agreement. By 1995, he was the organization's National Executive director. That same year, the group helped form the Reform Party of the United States. Verney labeled this "the most significant thing that's happened in American politics in 130 years."

Verney served as the party's first chairman and as director for Perot's 1996 presidential campaign. Under the party's banner, Perot won 8.4% of the national vote in the 1996 presidential election and in 1998, former wrestler Jesse Ventura was elected Governor of Minnesota.

After Ventura made comments in Playboy Magazine that offended some members of the party, Verney sent a letter to Governor Ventura, asking for his resignation from the party for his comments "about religion, sexual assault, overweight people, drugs, prostitution, women's undergarments and many other subjects [that] do not represent the values, principles or ethics upon which this party was built." In the letter, he admonished Ventura for bringing "shame to yourself and disgrace to the members of the Reform Party." Ventura had no response to the request.

He did not run for re-election in 1999 as the party's chairman, commenting that it was time for someone else to hold the position. To his chagrin, Jack Gargan, a close ally of Jesse Ventura, was elected to the position. He sparred often with Verney, whom Gargan and Ventura felt had operated the party in a dictatorial fashion for too long.

=== 2000s ===
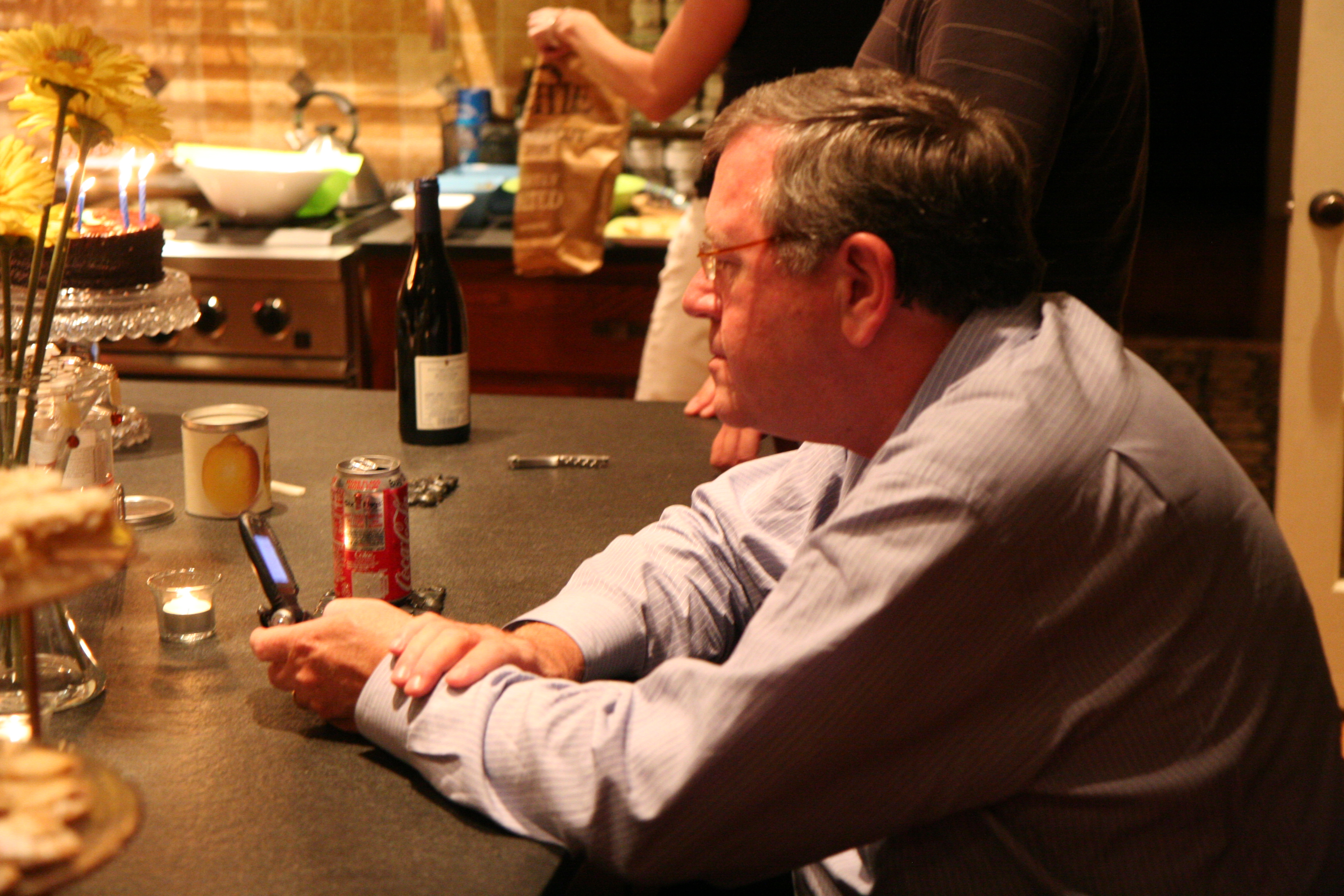
Verney working during a Barr campaign party

Hoping to decrease the influence of Ventura, Verney convinced Pat Buchanan to run for the party's presidential nomination in 2000. However, Verney soon became upset with Buchanan's socially conservative positions, explaining that he was attempting to change the party into an "ideologically pure right-wing party." Eventually, the Reform Party split after Verney led a walk-out that protested Pat Buchanan's nomination.

The New York Times ran an article on Verney, discussing how he stayed with one faction of the Reform Party as it continued its reduction following Perot's campaigns and the 2000 split. Verney stated that he would eventually leave the party, but that he "would never really leave Ross [Perot]" because, in his words, "I love the man. He's my hero."

Verney served as former Republican Congressman Bob Barr's campaign manager for his presidential run as the nominee of the Libertarian Party in 2008. Barr finished the race in fourth place with 0.4% of the vote.
