= Dixie County, Florida =

County in Florida, United States

- County
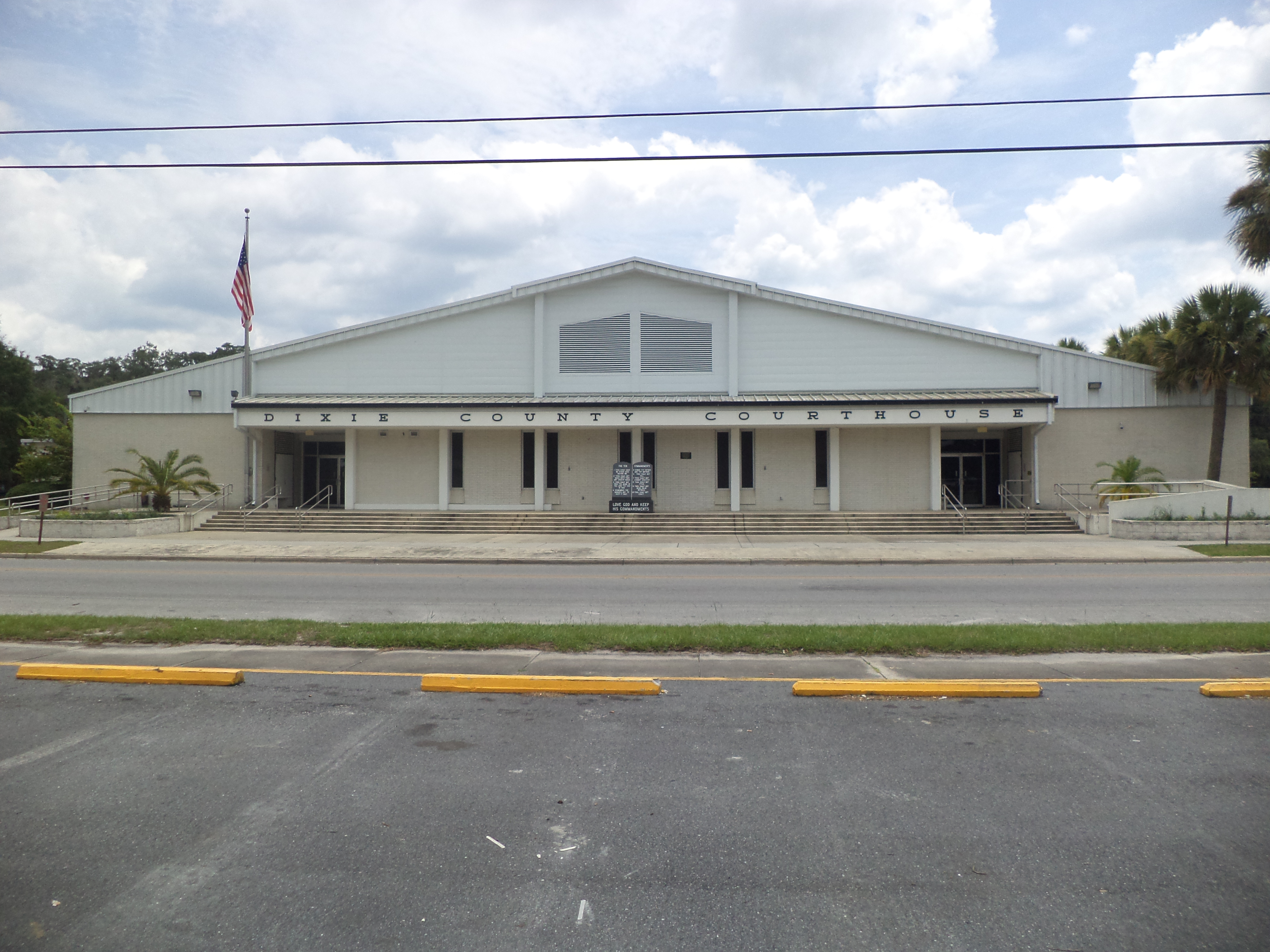
- Dixie County Courthouse

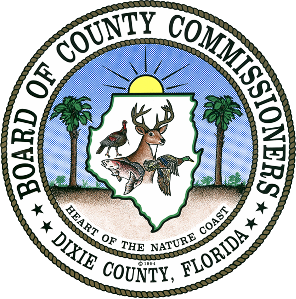
- Seal

- Location within the U.S. state of Florida
- Coordinates: 29°35′N 83°11′W
- Country: United States
- State: Florida
- Founded: April 25, 1921
- Named for: Dixieland
- Seat: Cross City
- Largest town: Cross City

Area
  - Total: 864 sq mi (2,240 km^{2})
  - Land: 705 sq mi (1,830 km^{2})
  - Water: 159 sq mi (410 km^{2}) 18.4%

Population (2020)
  - Total: 16,759
  - Estimate (2025): 18,038 ▲
  - Density: 23.8/sq mi (9.18/km^{2})
- Time zone: UTC−5 (Eastern)
  - Summer (DST): UTC−4 (EDT)
- Congressional district: 3rd
- Website: www.dixiecounty.us

Dixie County is a county located in the Big Bend region of the northern part of the U.S. state of Florida. As of the 2020 census, the population was 16,759. Its county seat is Cross City.

== History ==
Dixie County was created in 1921 from the southern portion of Lafayette County and named for "Dixie", the common nickname for the southern United States.

== Geography ==
According to the U.S. Census Bureau, the county has a total area of 864 square miles (2,240 km^{2}), of which 705 square miles (1,830 km^{2}) is land and 159 square miles (410 km^{2}) (18.4%) is water.

=== Adjacent counties ===
- Taylor County – northwest
- Lafayette County – north
- Gilchrist County – east
- Levy County – southeast

=== National protected area ===
- Lower Suwannee National Wildlife Refuge (part)

== Demographics ==
Historical population
Census	Pop.	Note	%±
1930	6,419		—
1940	7,018		9.3%
1950	3,928		−44.0%
1960	4,479		14.0%
1970	5,480		22.3%
1980	7,751		41.4%
1990	10,585		36.6%
2000	13,827		30.6%
2010	16,422		18.8%
2020	16,759		2.1%
2025 (est.)	18,038	▲	7.6%
U.S. Decennial Census; 1790–1960 1900–1990; 1990–2000 2010–2015 2019

Dixie County, Florida – Racial and ethnic composition Note: the US Census treats Hispanic/Latino as an ethnic category. This table excludes Latinos from the racial categories and assigns them to a separate category. Hispanics/Latinos may be of any race.
Race / Ethnicity (NH = Non-Hispanic)	Pop 1980	Pop 1990	Pop 2000	Pop 2010	Pop 2020	% 1980	% 1990	% 2000	% 2010	% 2020
White alone (NH)	6,774	9,524	12,132	14,220	13,750	87.40%	89.98%	87.74%	86.59%	82.05%
Black or African American alone (NH)	885	918	1,231	1,364	1,551	11.42%	8.67%	8.90%	8.31%	9.25%
Native American or Alaska Native alone (NH)	17	34	59	63	61	0.22%	0.32%	0.43%	0.38%	0.36%
Asian alone (NH)	4	12	34	48	58	0.05%	0.11%	0.25%	0.29%	0.35%
Native Hawaiian or Pacific Islander alone (NH)	x	x	4	2	0	x	x	0.03%	0.01%	0.00%
Other race alone (NH)	3	1	2	4	33	0.04%	0.01%	0.01%	0.02%	0.20%
Mixed race or Multiracial (NH)	x	x	116	209	618	x	x	0.84%	1.27%	3.69%
Hispanic or Latino (any race)	68	96	249	512	688	0.88%	0.91%	1.80%	3.12%	4.11%
Total	7,751	10,585	13,827	16,422	16,759	100.00%	100.00%	100.00%	100.00%	100.00%

A map of racial demographics in Dixie County, Florida by census tract Legend: Non-Hispanic White 60–70% 80–90% >90%

=== 2020 census ===
The 2020 United States census counted 16,759 people, 6,248 households, and 3,905 families in Dixie County, Florida. The population density was 23.8 per square mile (9.2/km^{2}). There were 9,276 housing units at an average density of 13.2 per square mile (5.1/km^{2}). The racial makeup was 83.88% (14,057) white or European American (82.05% non-Hispanic white), 9.37% (1,571) black or African-American, 0.36% (61) Native American or Alaska Native, 0.38% (64) Asian, 0.02% (4) Pacific Islander or Native Hawaiian, 1.28% (214) from other races, and 4.7% (788) from two or more races. Hispanic or Latino of any race was 4.11% (688) of the population.

Of the 6,248 households, 24.7% had children under the age of 18; 43.3% were married couples living together; 25.9% had a female householder with no spouse or partner present. 29.9% of households consisted of individuals and 15.8% had someone living alone who was 65 years of age or older. The average household size was 2.4 and the average family size was 3.0. The percent of those with a bachelor’s degree or higher was estimated to be 7.2% of the population.

18.1% of the population was under the age of 18, 6.1% from 18 to 24, 23.1% from 25 to 44, 29.5% from 45 to 64, and 23.2% who were 65 years of age or older. The median age was 47.5 years. For every 100 females, there were 79.8 males. For every 100 females ages 18 and older, there were 77.3 males.

The 2016–2020 5-year American Community Survey estimates show that the median household income was $41,674 (with a margin of error of +/- $1,917). The median family income was $47,188 (+/- $8,669). Males had a median income of $32,985 (+/- $2,117) versus $21,214 (+/- $3,480) for females. The median income for those above 16 years old was $27,358 (+/- $5,285). Approximately, 11.9% of families and 16.8% of the population were below the poverty line, including 27.4% of those under the age of 18 and 9.7% of those ages 65 or over.

=== 2000 census ===
In 2000 there were an estimated 5,205 households and 3,659 families residing in the county. The population density was 20 people per square mile (7.7 people/km^{2}). There were 7,362 housing units at an average density of 10 per square mile (3.9/km^{2}). The racial makeup of the county was 88.80% White, 8.98% Black or African American, 0.46% Native American, 0.25% Asian, 0.03% Pacific Islander, 0.45% from other races, and 1.03% from two or more races. 1.80% of the population were Hispanic or Latino of any race. In terms of ancestry, 39.7% were English, 15.2% were Irish, 14.7% were American, and 5.2% were German.

There were 5,205 households, out of which 27.40% had children under the age of 18 living with them, 54.90% were married couples living together, 10.60% had a female householder with no husband present, and 29.70% were non-families. 23.90% of all households were made up of individuals, and 11.60% had someone living alone who was 65 years of age or older. The average household size was 2.44 and the average family size was 2.87.

In the county, the population was spread out, with 22.10% under the age of 18, 7.90% from 18 to 24, 26.60% from 25 to 44, 26.20% from 45 to 64, and 17.10% who were 65 years of age or older. The median age was 41 years. For every 100 females there were 113.90 males. For every 100 females age 18 and over, there were 117.20 males.

The median income for a household in the county was $26,082, and the median income for a family was $31,157. Males had a median income of $26,694 versus $17,863 for females. The per capita income for the county was $13,559. About 14.50% of families and 19.10% of the population were below the poverty line, including 23.90% of those under age 18 and 16.10% of those age 65 or over.

== Politics ==
=== Voter registration ===
According to the Secretary of State's office, Republicans constitute the majority of registered voters in Dixie County.

Dixie County Voter Registration & Party Enrollment as of December 31, 2022
Political Party	Total Voters	Percentage
Democratic	2,519	23.5%
Republican	6,306	58.8%
Independent	1,775	16.5%
Third Parties	131	1.2%
Total	10,731	100.00%

=== Statewide elections ===
Republicans hold the majority of registered voters in the county. Democrats have not carried a majority of votes in a presidential election since 1980 (and last carried a plurality in 1996), nor have they carried a majority in a gubernatorial election since 1994. The county has rapidly and steadily shifted Republican since the 1990s; by 2016, the Republican candidate earned over 80% of the vote in the presidential election. In 2020, the Republican nominee gained over 82% of the vote.

United States presidential election results for Dixie County, Florida
Year	Republican		Democratic		Third party(ies)	
Year	No.	%	No.	%	No.	%
1924	14	5.13%	257	94.14%	2	0.73%
1928	463	57.52%	342	42.48%	0	0.00%
1932	55	4.78%	1,096	95.22%	0	0.00%
1936	64	5.19%	1,170	94.81%	0	0.00%
1940	84	5.59%	1,420	94.41%	0	0.00%
1944	84	7.07%	1,104	92.93%	0	0.00%
1948	111	8.73%	862	67.82%	298	23.45%
1952	440	34.81%	824	65.19%	0	0.00%
1956	370	29.04%	904	70.96%	0	0.00%
1960	392	28.65%	976	71.35%	0	0.00%
1964	908	49.59%	923	50.41%	0	0.00%
1968	217	10.39%	325	15.57%	1,546	74.04%
1972	1,628	81.52%	367	18.38%	2	0.10%
1976	558	20.28%	2,169	78.82%	25	0.91%
1980	1,101	34.70%	2,010	63.35%	62	1.95%
1984	2,204	64.29%	1,224	35.71%	0	0.00%
1988	2,031	59.79%	1,366	40.21%	0	0.00%
1992	1,401	32.04%	1,855	42.42%	1,117	25.54%
1996	1,399	36.82%	1,734	45.63%	667	17.55%
2000	2,697	57.79%	1,827	39.15%	143	3.06%
2004	4,434	68.83%	1,960	30.43%	48	0.75%
2008	5,194	71.22%	1,925	26.40%	174	2.39%
2012	5,052	72.60%	1,798	25.84%	109	1.57%
2016	5,822	80.35%	1,270	17.53%	154	2.13%
2020	6,759	82.70%	1,365	16.70%	49	0.60%
2024	6,920	84.77%	1,183	14.49%	60	0.74%

United States Senate election results for Dixie County, Florida1
Year	Republican		Democratic		Third party(ies)	
Year	No.	%	No.	%	No.	%
2024	6,673	83.39%	1,169	14.61%	160	2.00%

United States Senate election results for Dixie County, Florida3
Year	Republican		Democratic		Third party(ies)	
Year	No.	%	No.	%	No.	%
2022	5,225	85.18%	826	13.47%	83	1.35%

Florida Gubernatorial election results for Dixie County
Year	Republican		Democratic		Third party(ies)	
Year	No.	%	No.	%	No.	%
1994	1,981	49.66%	2,003	50.21%	5	0.13%
1998	1,855	60.44%	1,209	39.39%	5	0.16%
2002	2,273	56.03%	1,722	42.45%	62	1.53%
2006	2,651	52.69%	2,109	41.92%	271	5.39%
2010	2,810	53.64%	2,058	39.28%	371	7.08%
2014	3,345	62.41%	1,657	30.91%	358	6.68%
2018	4,663	80.38%	1,008	17.38%	130	2.24%
2022	5,394	87.30%	735	11.90%	50	0.81%

== Points of interest ==
- City of Hawkinsville – sunken steamboat in the Suwannee River near Old Town, one of the Florida Underwater Archaeological Preserves.
- Old Town Elementary School, now the Dixie County Cultural Center.
- Old Town Methodist Church built in 1890 located behind the 1983 church building.
- Putnam Lodge in Cross City, Florida built by the Putnam Lumber Company for its nearby lumber town of Shamrock

== Library ==
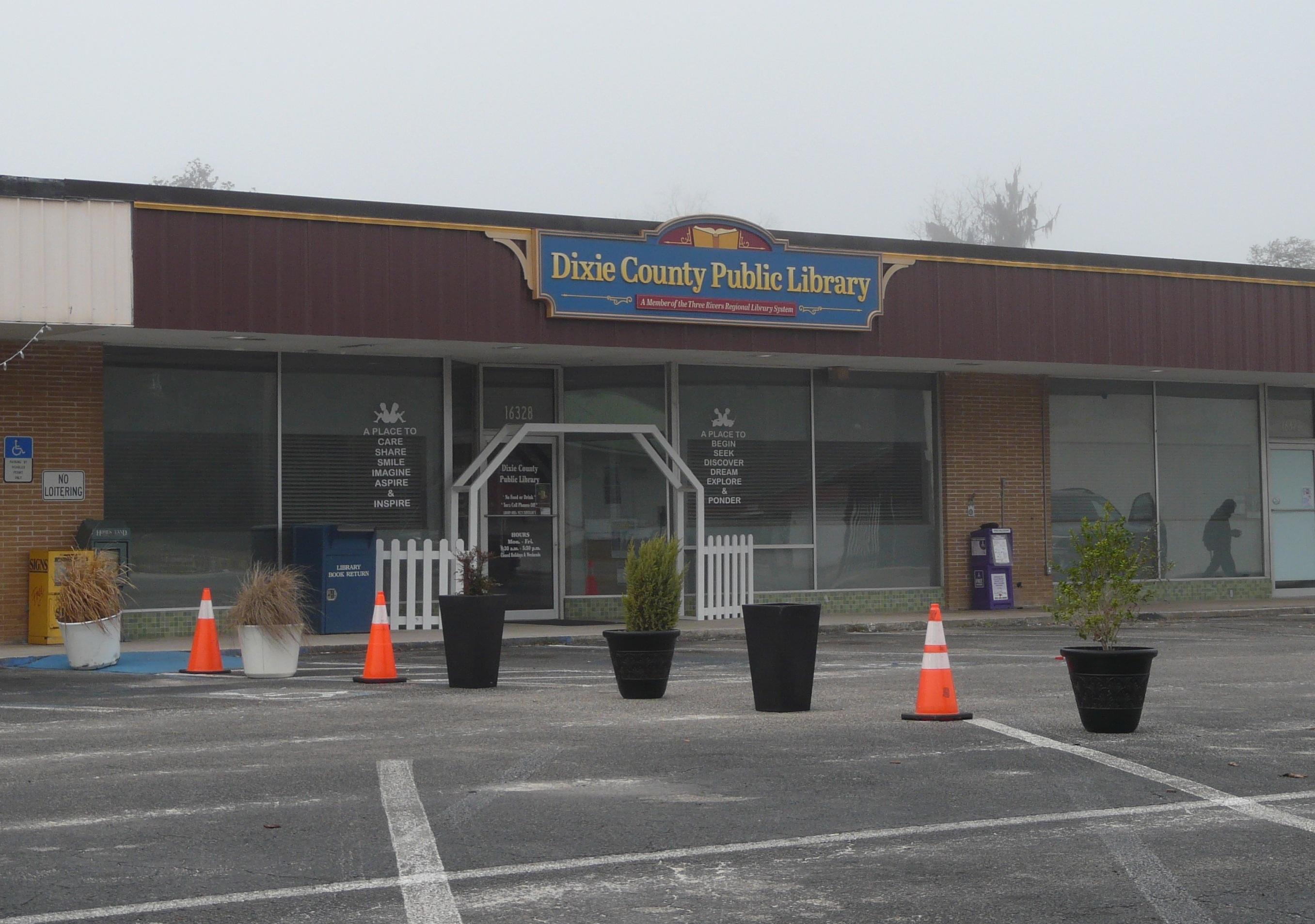
Dixie County Library in Cross City, Florida

The Dixie County Library is part of the Three Rivers Regional Library System, which also serves Gilchrist, Lafayette, and Taylor counties. It is located at 16328 SE 19th Highway in Cross City, Florida. The branch is open Monday through Friday, 8:30 a.m.–5:30 p.m. The current library director is Cindy Bellot.

== Communities ==
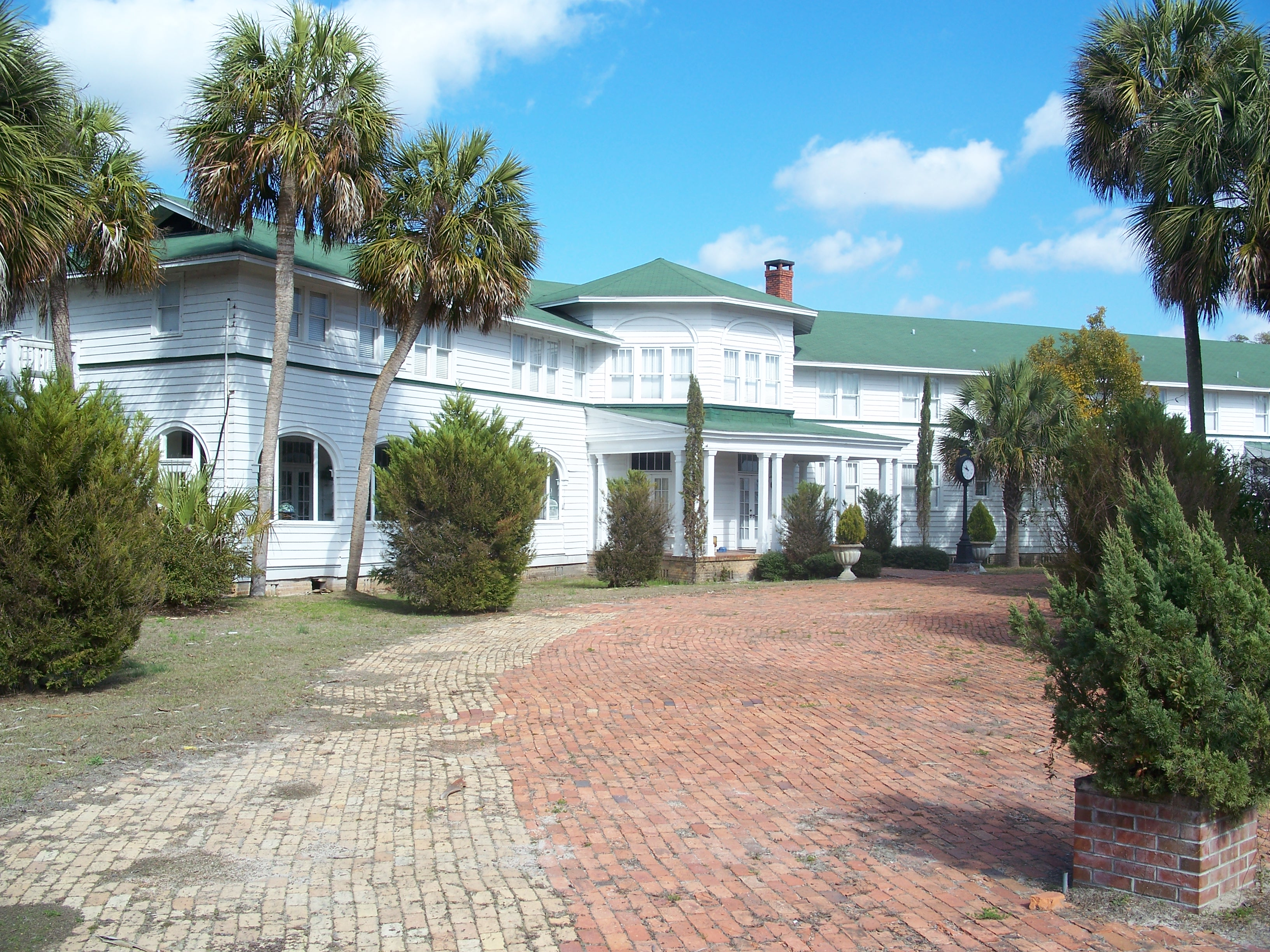
Putnam Lodge, in Shamrock

=== Towns ===
- Cross City
- Horseshoe Beach

=== Unincorporated communities ===
- Clara (partly in Taylor County)
- Eugene
- Hines
- Jena
- Jonesboro
- Old Town
- Shamrock
- Shired Island
- Suwannee
- Yellow Jacket

== Transportation ==
=== Airports ===
- Dixie County Airport

=== Major highways ===
- US 19 / US 98 / US 27 Alt. (SR 55), are the main US highways throughout Dixie County, running southeast to northwest from the bridge over the Suwannee River at the Levy-Gilchrist county line to the bridge over the Steinhatchee River at the Taylor County line. US Routes 98 and 27 Alternate overlap US 19 throughout the county.
- SR 51 passes through a short sliver of Dixie County in western Taylor County between Taylor and Lafayette Counties, but has no major intersections.
- SR 349 / CR 349 runs south to north from US 19-98-Alt. 27 in Old Town along the eastern end of the county, eventually crossing the border into Lafayette County. A county extension runs south toward Yellow Jacket and Suwannee.

== See also ==
- Dixie District Schools
- National Register of Historic Places listings in Dixie County, Florida
