= Shired Island =

Human settlement in United States of America

Coordinates: 29°23′50″N 83°12′03″W

Shired Island is an unincorporated and largely undeveloped area in Dixie County, Florida, along the Gulf Coast. Shired Island is home to Shired Island Campground, a county park with RV sites, tent sites, and a boat ramp. Shired Island is bordered by Shired Creek and Johnson Creek. The area offshore is highly regarded for fishing. Shired Island is accessible by County Road 357.
