= Putnam Lodge =

Historic hotel in Florida

Coordinates: 29°38′28″N 83°8′31″W

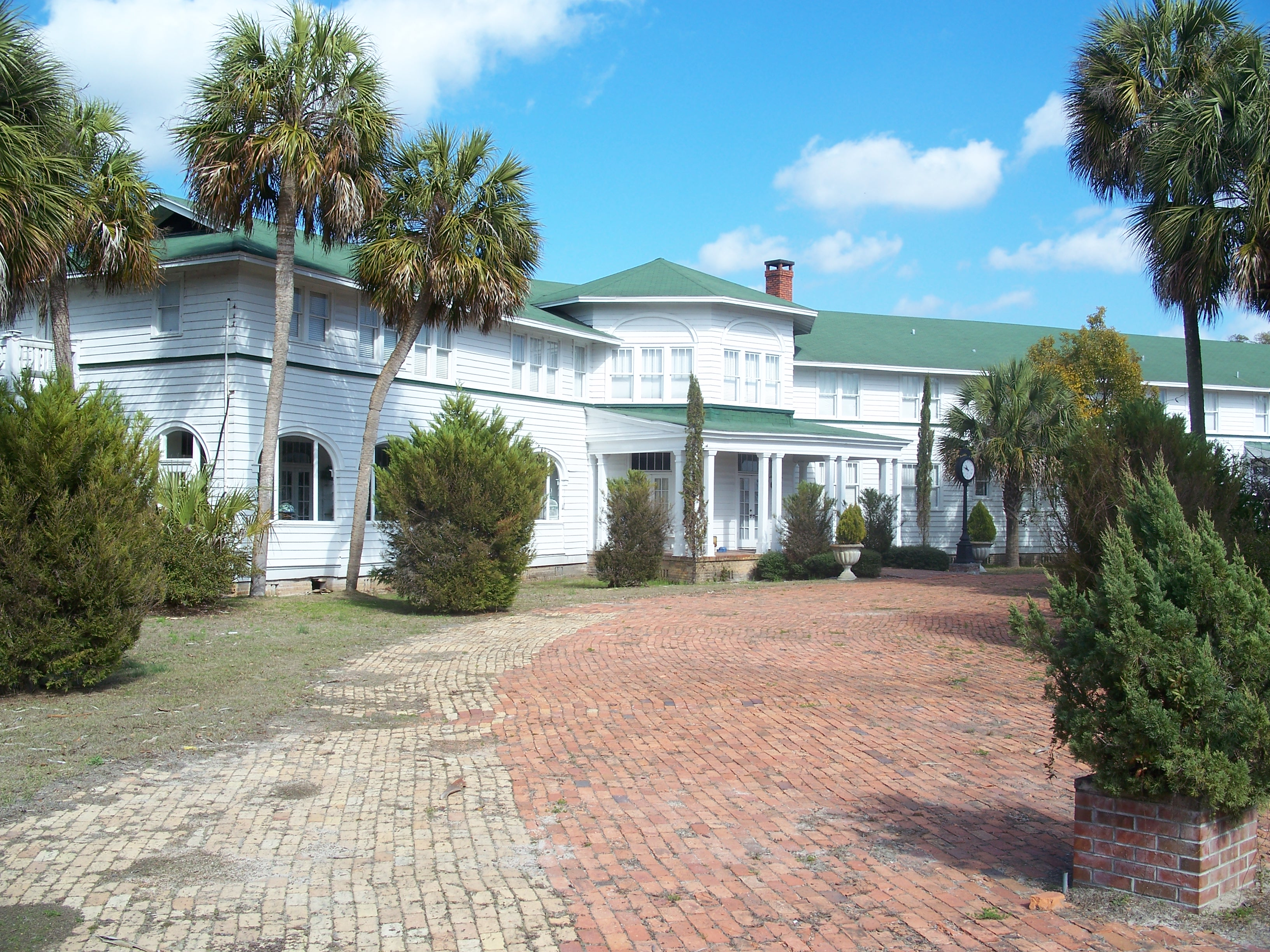
Putnam Lodge in 2011

Putnam Lodge is a historic hotel built in 1927 in Dixie County, Florida. Depending on the source it is located in Shamrock, Florida or adjacent Cross City, Florida. It was built in the company town developed around Putnam Lumber Company's operations in Shamrock. The hotel was renovated for a 2014 reopening after being closed for many years.

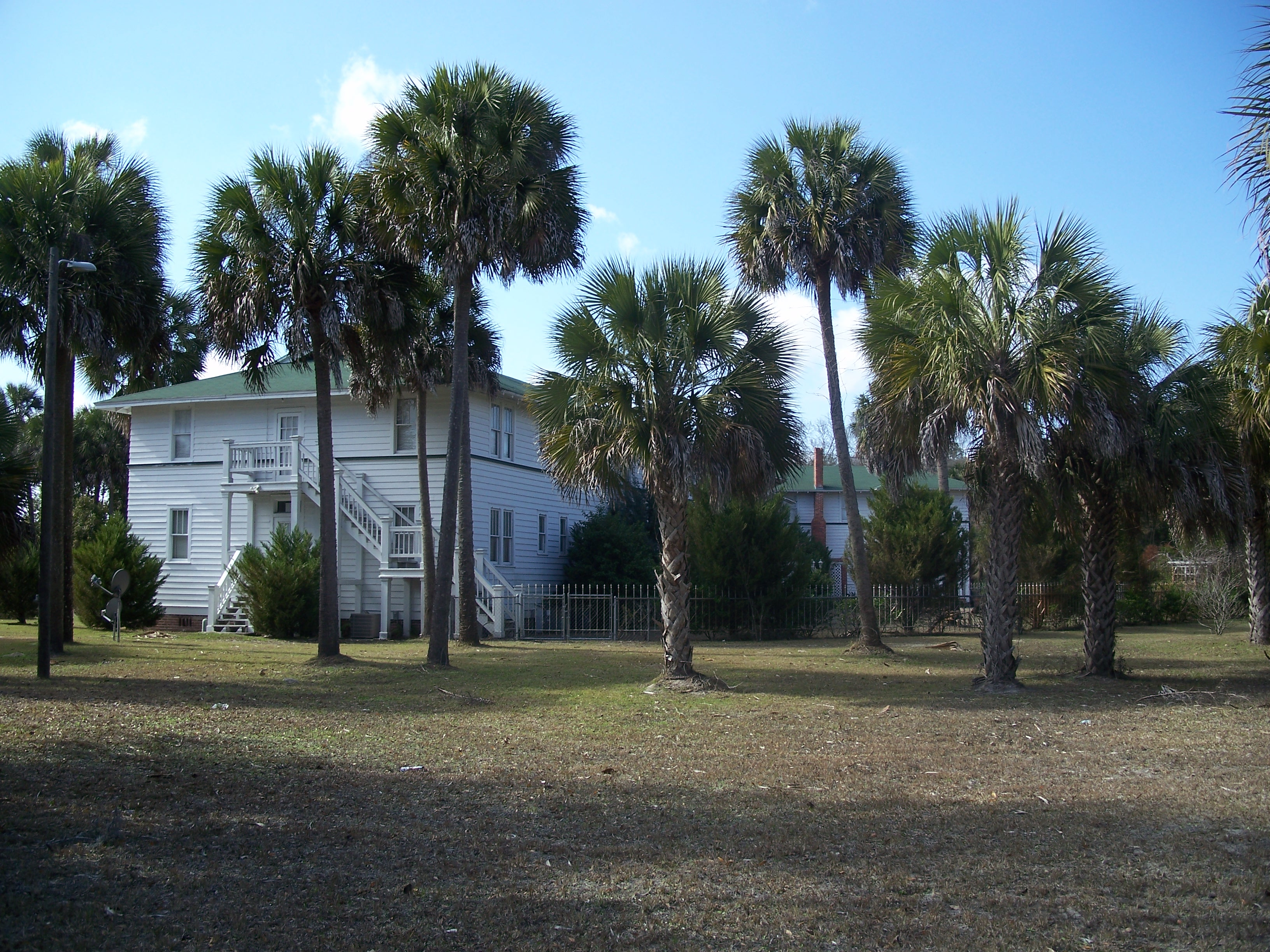
View of the lodge and part of grounds

Putnam Lodge features a lobby with hand-stenciled pecky cypress columns and heart pine floors as well as a new spa added by the Tampa-based entrepreneurs who restored and revamped the lodge. It sits on 18 acres of land.

The hotel was built across from the mill and main commissary in Shamrock to welcome the growing number of tourists visiting Florida. A dairy and ice plant were also built. The hotel was noted in restaurant guide Duncan Hines put out in 1938.

A 1931 report on a visit to the lumber company plant and lodge was reported in the Southern Lumberman. Wayne B. Wetherington wrote about his family's stake in the lodge in his memoir.
