= Shamrock, Florida =

- Unincorporated community
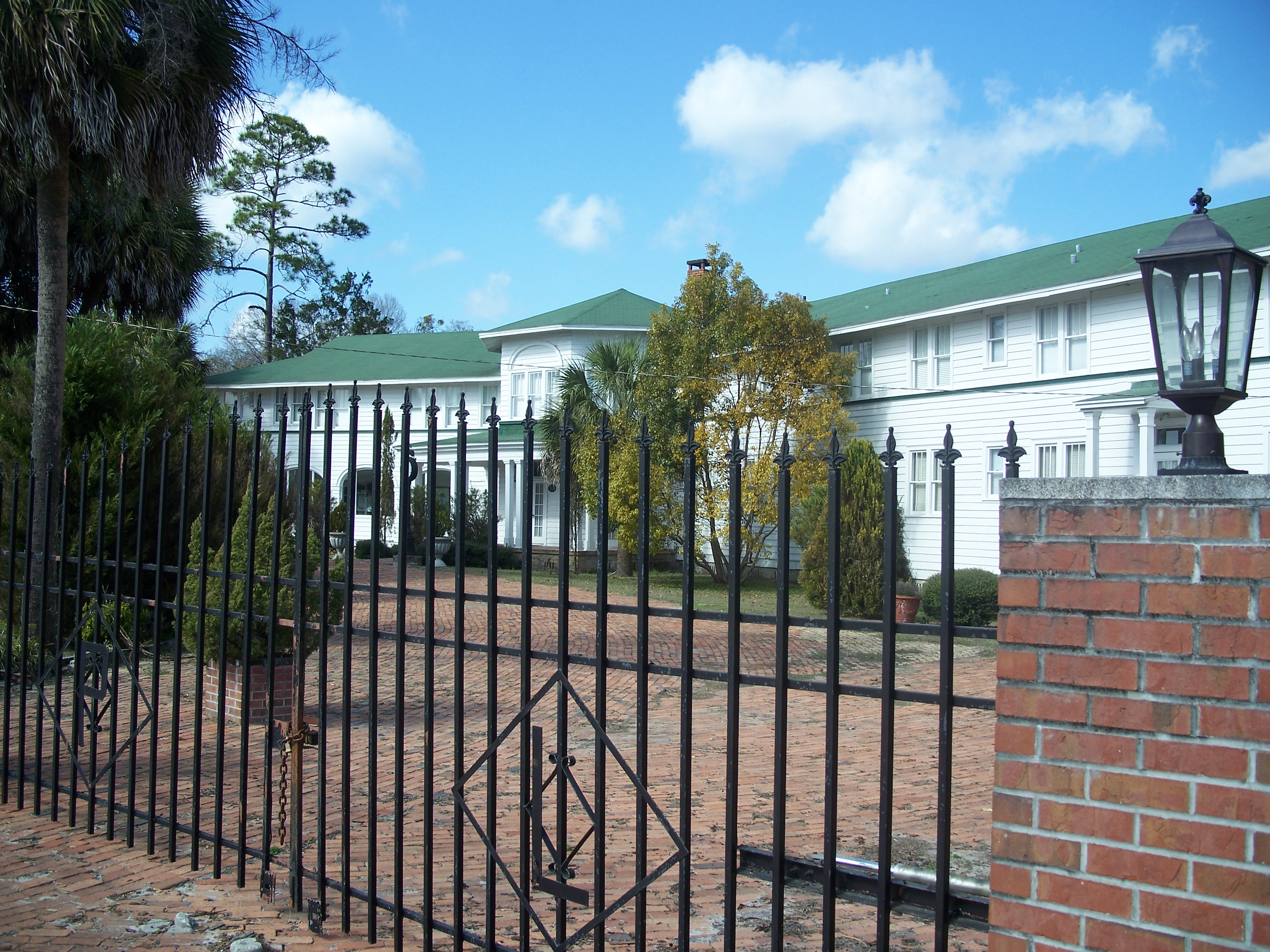
- Putnam Lodge in 2011

- Location within Florida
- Coordinates: 29°38′36″N 83°08′41″W
- Country: United States
- State: Florida
- County: Dixie
- Elevation: 39 ft (12 m)
- Time zone: UTC-5 (Eastern (EST))
  - Summer (DST): UTC-4 (EDT)
- Area code: 352
- GNIS feature ID: 290922

Shamrock is an unincorporated community in Dixie County, Florida, United States. The community is located at US 19–ALT 27-98. The historic Putnam Lodge, built for the Putnam Lumber Company's operations in Shamrock is located nearby in Cross City, Florida.

Immediately behind the lodge was the company town. Wood-frame homes were built for the company employees and later rented to the general public. This part of Shamrock was abandoned by the latter part of the century and no longer exists today.

The company store consisting of a row of connected wood-framed offices included mercantile and medical facilities until the late 1950s. This structure was also abandoned and no longer exists today.
