= Jack Gargan (politician) =

American politician (1930–2018)

- Born: October 20, 1930; Philadelphia, Pennsylvania, U.S.
- Died: November 4, 2018 (aged 88); Thailand
- Political party: Reform

John "Jack" Gargan (October 20, 1930 – November 4, 2018) was an American financial consultant who became the second chairman of the Reform Party (after Russ Verney) started by Ross Perot. He is also known for the creation of Throw the Hypocritical Rascals Out (T.H.R.O.), an organization whose platform was to vote out all incumbent members of Congress and to set term limits on all members of Congress. He is considered the "father" of the American term limits movement.

== Early life and education ==
John "Jack" Gargan was born in Philadelphia, Pennsylvania on October 20, 1930. Gargan graduated from Prospect Park High School in June 1948. In 2002 he and his brother Jim were two of the twenty graduates chosen to be in the Prospect Park High School (1932–1952) Hall of Fame. He joined the Pennsylvania National Guard, 111th Regimental Combat Team in October 1947. He served in the US Navy and was honorably discharged in July. 1952. He then served in the US Army and was honorably discharged in July 1954.

Following his service in the military, Gargan attended Birmingham-Southern College and graduated in March 1957 with a degree in Business Administration. After graduation, he moved to Florida and attended Stetson University College of Law in 1970.

== Finance career ==
Gargan had a career as an insurance agent and financial consultant since 1957 as well as a professional handwriting analyst since 1962. He was an adjunct professor of Finance from 1970 until 1986 at Hillsboro Community College in Tampa, Florida. He was recognized by the Chicago Board of Trade as one of the "outstanding instructors in finance in the USA".

In 1984, angry over the ease with which charlatans were able to register as authorized financial planners, Gargan submitted his dog, Beauregard, for membership in the International Association for Financial Planning. The half-schnauzer, half-poodle received a membership card in the name Boris 'Bo' Regaard, CFP, CLU Certified Financial Planner, and Chartered Life Underwriter. This was publicized in over 3,000 media outlets. It led to the demise of that once-powerful organization.

In 1984, Gargan became the founder, President and CEO of the International Association of Registered Financial Consultants (IARFC). Now headquartered in Middletown, Ohio, it is the premier and largest professional association for financial consultants in the world.

In 1985 he founded the MacGeoghegan Family Society, and in 1992 was honored in a ceremony televised on Irish national TV as the first Irish High Chief to be elected and inaugurated in more than 350 years. In 2012 Gargan was awarded the Clans of Ireland Order of Merit at the presidential palace in Dublin, Ireland.

== Political career ==
Gargan ran for Tampa City Council in 1976 as "The Shoestring Candidate", spending only $4.56 as a protest candidate while others were spending upwards of $40,000 in a campaign for this part-time position paying only $9,000 annually. He lost 2 to 1 to Sandra Freedman, later elected Mayor of Tampa.

=== T.H.R.O ===
In Florida in 1990, Gargan, serving without compensation for most of the two-year campaign, founded T.H.R.O. (Throw the Hypocritical Rascals Out), took $50,000 from his retirement savings to seed a series of "I'm mad as hell and I'm not going to take it anymore" newspaper ads (a reference to a famous line from the 1976 political and mass media satire movie Network). Over the next two years more than 300,000 supporters contributed to the campaign.

In addition to holding hundreds of town hall meetings in all fifty states and appearing on more than a thousand radio and TV shows (including Donahue, Good Morning America and Inside Edition), he ran 633 full-page newspaper advertisements in nearly every major newspaper in the nation denouncing U.S. Congress for recklessly increasing the national debt, pandering to special interests and voting for legislative pay raises at a time when average wages nationwide were not increasing. For his efforts Gargan was named Time magazine's "Hero of the Week", earned the sobriquet "father of the national term limits movement", and was featured in full-color, multi-page cover stories in USA Today and the Orlando Sun weekend inserts. More importantly, there were 124 new members of Congress in the 1992 elections, more than ten times the number of incumbents defeated in prior years.

=== Ross Perot support ===
In May 1991, Gargan realized that true governmental reform could not be achieved without a strong and reformative leader in the Oval Office. It was then that he thought of the CEO of Electronic Data Systems, Ross Perot. A man who Gargan had greatly admired for years beforehand and was also an early supporter of T.H.R.O, offering his assistance to Gargan if he ever needed it in 1990. As a result, Gargan travelled to Perot's office in Dallas that some month, where he had an hour long conversation with Perot, who appeared apprehensive at running for president. Undeterred by Perot's stubbornness, in June 1991 he was the originator and driving force of the "Draft Perot for President" campaign. To help anchor support for a possible Perot campaign, Gargan organized a convention to be held in Tampa with Perot as the keynote speaker, where Perot gave his famous "Clean out the Barn" speech.

In 1994, with a war chest of only $68,000 (~$130,150 in 2024), he ran for Governor of Florida, getting the third highest vote count in a field of nine candidates, most spending millions. Only incumbent Governor Lawton Chiles, who was re-elected, and Republican Jeb Bush received more votes.

=== Reform Party ===
In 1998, Gargan ran on the Reform Party ticket for the United States House of Representatives, 5th Congressional District seat against incumbent Democrat Karen Thurman. He received 33.7% of the vote (the highest vote count for a third party candidate [not "Independent"] in the history of the US), but still lost the election.

He was ousted as Reform Party chairman by a 109–31 vote in February 2000. He asked his supporters to boycott the illegally-called convention.

He was a guest speaker at the 2000 Libertarian National Convention, as well as at the Harvard Law School Forum in 1999.

In 2002, Gargan ran again for the 5th district seat, this time as an independent in a three-way Republican-targeted race. He received 3.39% of the vote. In this race, the Democratic incumbent Karen Thurman was defeated by Republican Ginny Brown-Waite.

Gargan died in 2018 at the age of 88.

== Publications ==
- How to Avoid Income Taxes and Estate taxes – Twenty-four Legal Ways To Keep your Money out of Uncle Sam's Pockets
- How to Avoid Estate Taxes, The Complete Guide to Estate Planning (a Fortune magazine Book-of-the-Month selection)
- Milking Your Business for all its Worth, Money Management For Newlyweds And Other Beginners
- Growing Up Fast, Poor, Cold, and Hungry – A First-hand Account Of Life In The Great Depression.
