= Old Town Elementary School (Old Town, Florida) =

Historic school in Florida, United States

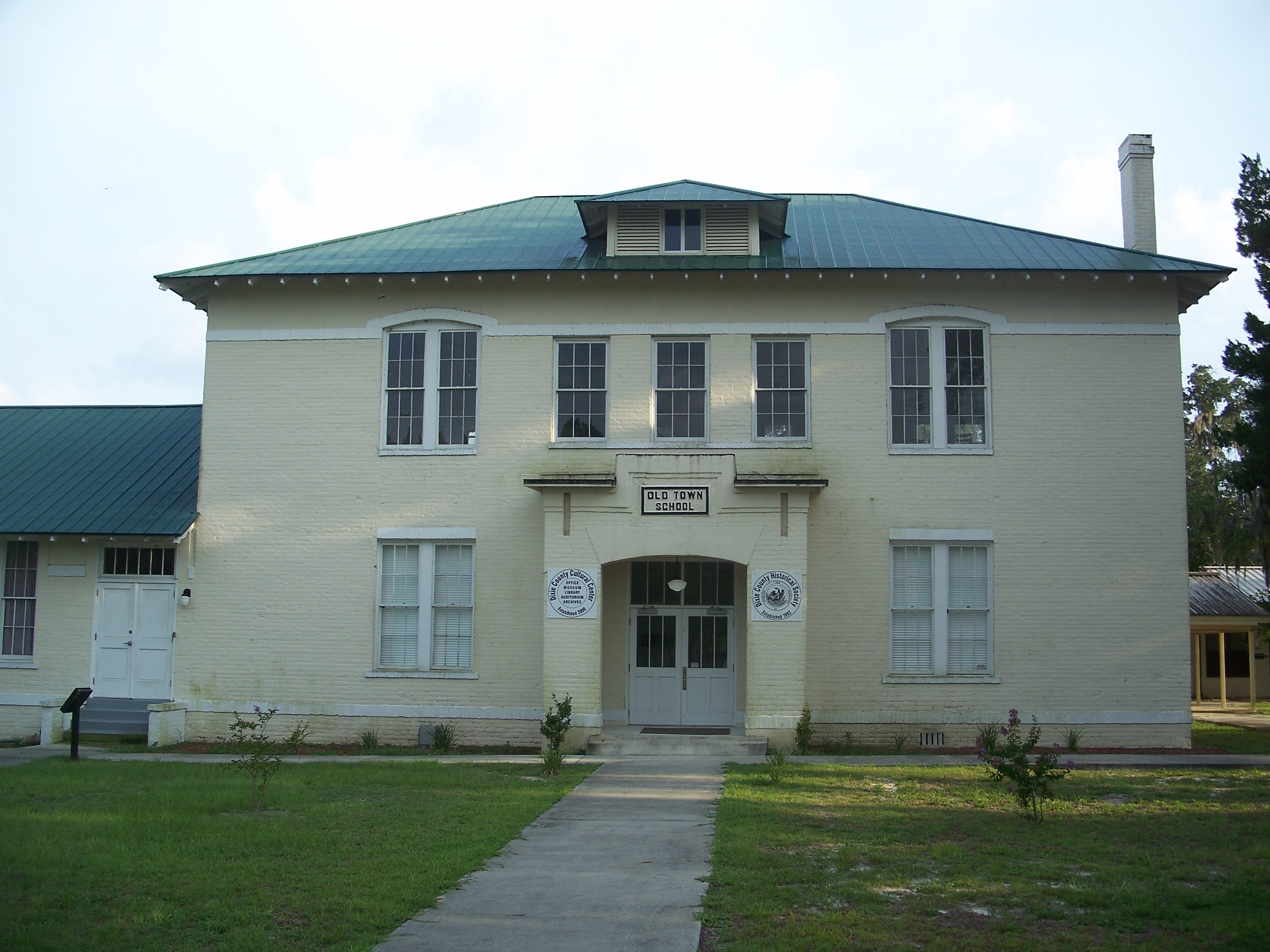
- Old Town Elementary School
- Interactive map of the Old Town Elementary School area

General information
- Location: Old Town, Florida, U.S.
- Coordinates: 29.590793°N 82.9817°W
- Construction started: 1909
- Completed: 1910; auditorium 1930
- Client: County Board of Public Instruction

The former Old Town Elementary School is an historic two-story, four-classroom school building in Old Town, Dixie County, Florida. Built in 1909-1910 of bricks fired on site, it is the oldest public building in Dixie County. In 1930 the auditorium was built by George Levingston. In 1999, it was replaced by a new school. Today it is operated by the Dixie County Historical Society as the Dixie County Cultural Center, with space for its office, a local history museum and a library.

In 1989, the school complex was listed in A Guide to Florida's Historic Architecture, published by the University of Florida Press.
