= Lower Suwannee National Wildlife Refuge =

Refuge on the western coast of Florida, U.S.

- IUCN category IV (habitat/species management area)
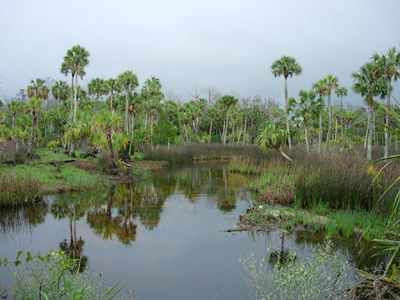
- Tidal creek off Dixie Mainline

- Location within the United States
- Location: Dixie County, Levy County, Florida, United States
- Nearest city: Otter Creek, Florida
- Coordinates: 29°19′N 83°06′W
- Area: 53,000 acres (210 km^{2})
- Established: 1979
- Governing body: U.S. Fish and Wildlife Service
- Website: Lower Suwannee National Wildlife Refuge

The Lower Suwannee National Wildlife Refuge (LSNWR) is part of the United States National Wildlife Refuge System. It is located in southeastern Dixie and northwestern Levy counties on the western coast of Florida, approximately fifty miles southwest of the city of Gainesville.

The 53,000-acre (210 km^{2}) wildlife refuge was established in 1979 to protect one of the largest undeveloped river delta systems in the United States. It includes twenty miles (32 km) of the Suwannee River estuary and twenty miles (32 km) of coastline. The constant influx of nutrients from the Suwannee River combined with numerous off-shore islands and tidal creeks create excellent wildlife habitat which supports kites, bald eagles, manatees, sturgeon, deer, and turkeys, to name but a few of the species which take refuge there.

For tourists, the refuge offers bird and wildlife observation, wildlife photography, fishing, canoeing, hunting, and interpretive walks. As of 2005, a wildlife driving tour is under construction and several boardwalks and observation towers offer views of refuge wildlife and habitat.

== Wildlife resources ==
The Suwannee River and nearby bottomland hardwood swamps, pine forests, cypress domes, tidal creeks, and vast salt marshes provide habitat for thousands of creatures every year. Many species including white-tailed deer, wild turkey, bobcat, bats, alligator, raccoon and river otter are present throughout the year — feeding, nesting, loafing, and roaming the forests and swamps. Gulf sturgeon, Florida salt marsh vole, eastern indigo snake, gopher tortoise, and wood stork are examples of threatened or endangered species that find suitable habitat within the refuge. Numerous birds, including the striking swallow-tailed kite, bald eagle, osprey, prothonotary warbler, and dozens of species of shorebirds use the refuge seasonally then migrate farther south during winter months. More than 250 species of birds have been identified on the refuge, with at least 90 of those species actually nesting there.

The refuge's undisturbed coastal salt marshes, tidal creeks, and tidal flats are some of the most productive ecosystems in the world. These areas provide important foraging habitat for thousands of shorebirds, such as sandpipers, dowitchers, American oystercatcher, ruddy turnstone, and plovers, as well as diving ducks.

Wading birds appear in the summer, including American white ibis, great egret, snowy egret, cattle egret, great blue heron, little blue heron, green heron, and tricolored heron, as well as the limpkin and wood stork; many of them forage along the Suwannee and roost in the islands of the nearby Cedar Keys National Wildlife Refuge.

These refuges also serve as a valuable nursery for fish, shrimp, shellfish and juvenile sea turtles. Freshwater fish, including largemouth bass, Suwannee bass, bluegill, redear sunfish and channel catfish are found in the river and its creeks. The West Indian manatee and bottlenose dolphin can often be seen in the Suwannee River and just offshore where the river meets the Gulf of Mexico.

Wildlife surveys and censuses provide useful information regarding various refuge species including bald eagles, swallow-tailed kites, breeding birds, and amphibians. Under special-use permits, the University of Florida and the United States Geological Survey are involved in on-going research activities on the refuge for various species including salt marsh voles and mosquitoes.

== Human historical significance ==
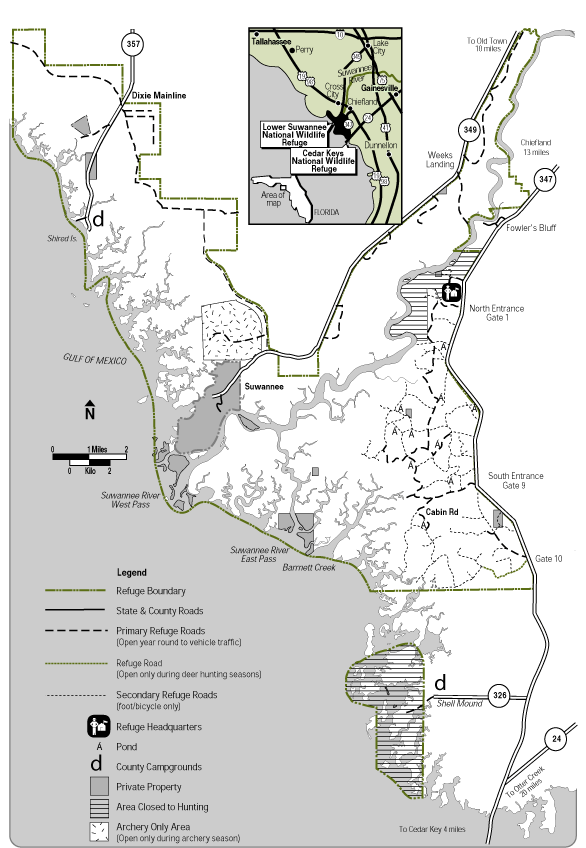
Map of the wildlife refuge

A 9 meters (30 feet) prehistoric midden known as the Shell Mound, which may be as much as 3,000 years old, is enclosed within the refuge, along with other evidence of ancient human habitation.

== Habitat management ==
Before the Lower Suwannee National Wildlife Refuge was established, much of the area was under commercial timber management, first by Putnam Lumber Company in the early 1900s, then by a succession of other timber and paper companies, notably Georgia-Pacific and Packaging Corporation of America. In the late 20th century, efforts were initiated to restore many of these areas to a more natural, pre-exploitation condition. Acres of loblolly pines were cruised, marked and selectively thinned — and in some cases clear-cut — to move toward reforestation to a native sandhill community of longleaf pine and wiregrass. Scrubland habitat is being restored and improved on high, dry sandy ridge areas where it was originally found.

In 2001, a conservation easement on the nearby California Swamp was acquired by the Suwannee River Water Management District, improving habitat preservation throughout the area.

Wildfires from lightning strikes have always occurred naturally throughout much of the United States and is a critical component of many Florida ecosystems: many species of wildlife such as the Florida scrub jay depend on fire to sustain their habitat. Today, many of those fires cannot be left to burn unmanaged due to development. The United States Fish and Wildlife Service is one of many agencies that use prescribed fire to mimic natural fires in a controlled manner. Fire lines are established with heavy equipment, trained personnel operate under a specific plan, and fires are intentionally set to help reduce hazardous fuels in the wildland/urban interface, replenish nutrients into the soil, and control vegetation by reducing undesirable species or vegetation heights. The goal is to burn areas that need fire every two to five years to maintain optimum habitat conditions.

At times, the refuge water management activities (i.e. controlling water levels with man-made structures such as culverts) create additional seasonal habitat for wading birds. Due to tidal influence, this activity is not often needed.

The Lower Suwannee National Wildlife Refuge is also a part of the Florida Wildlife Corridor.
