= Throw the Hypocritical Rascals Out =

T.H.R.O. ("Throw the Hypocritical Rascals Out") was a 1990/1991 US ad campaign by Jack Gargan advocating voting against incumbents. It started with $45,000 of Gargan's own money, but he eventually raised over $750,000 in donations.

== Background ==
In 1990, Jack Gargan began to believe that the US economy and political system were failing. Incidents including congressional pay raises, the Keating Five Senate hearings, and the S&L Crisis drove Gargan to borrow $45,000 from his retirement savings to finance the first of many independent ads entitled "I'm mad as hell and I'm not going to take it anymore" (a reference to a famous quote from the 1976 political and mass media satire movie, Network) newspaper advertisements denouncing the U.S. Congress for voting for legislative pay raises at a time when average wages nationwide were not increasing.

The original article, and subsequent articles sent to newspapers nationwide, drew widespread interest and T.H.R.O. ("Throw the Hypocritical Rascals Out") was formed. The 1990 congressional election was Gargan's target, and he urged citizens to vote all incumbent congressmen out of office and replace them with new blood. The movement was so widespread that Gargan was even named Time magazine's "Hero of the Week" on September 10, 1990.

The election did not possess the sweeping change that Gargan had hoped. Only 17 incumbents were thrown out. Nevertheless, it was a much higher margin of change since the last election, in which only seven incumbents had lost. Gargan also noted that there was a 12% cross-country differential spread compared to the spread of the previous election. It seemed that while incumbents were still very difficult to remove from office, the potential of this occurring was becoming greater. By January 2, 1991, just 132 days after the first ad was published, Gargan managed to raise $750,000 in donations, many of which were under $10. By this time, he had also purchased 142 newspaper ads in 49 states. Gargan also appeared on 250 radio talk shows, and was interviewed on Donahue, Larry King Live, Good Morning America, and CBS Morning News.
