= Old Town, Florida =

Human settlement in Florida, United States

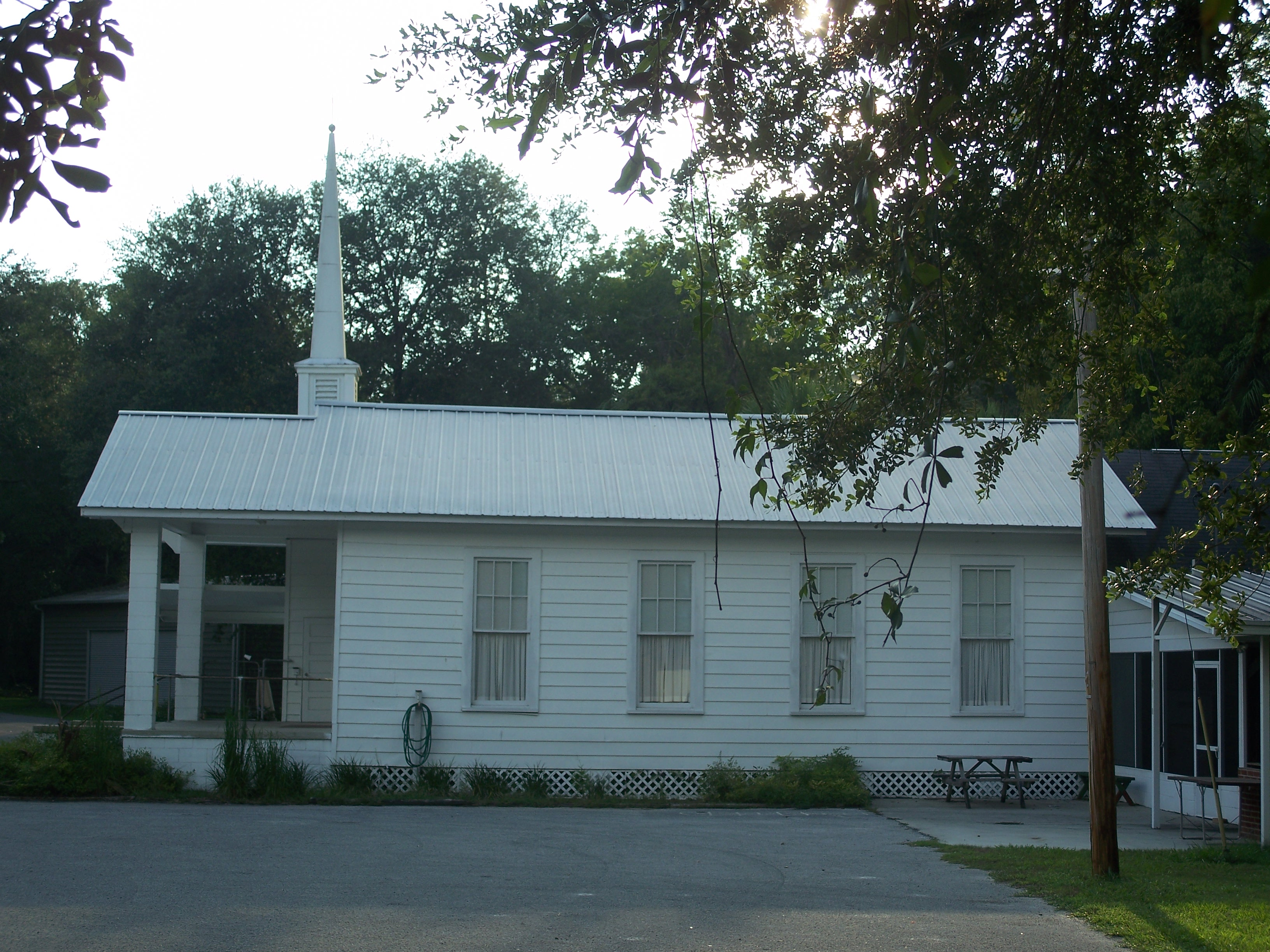
Old Town Methodist Church

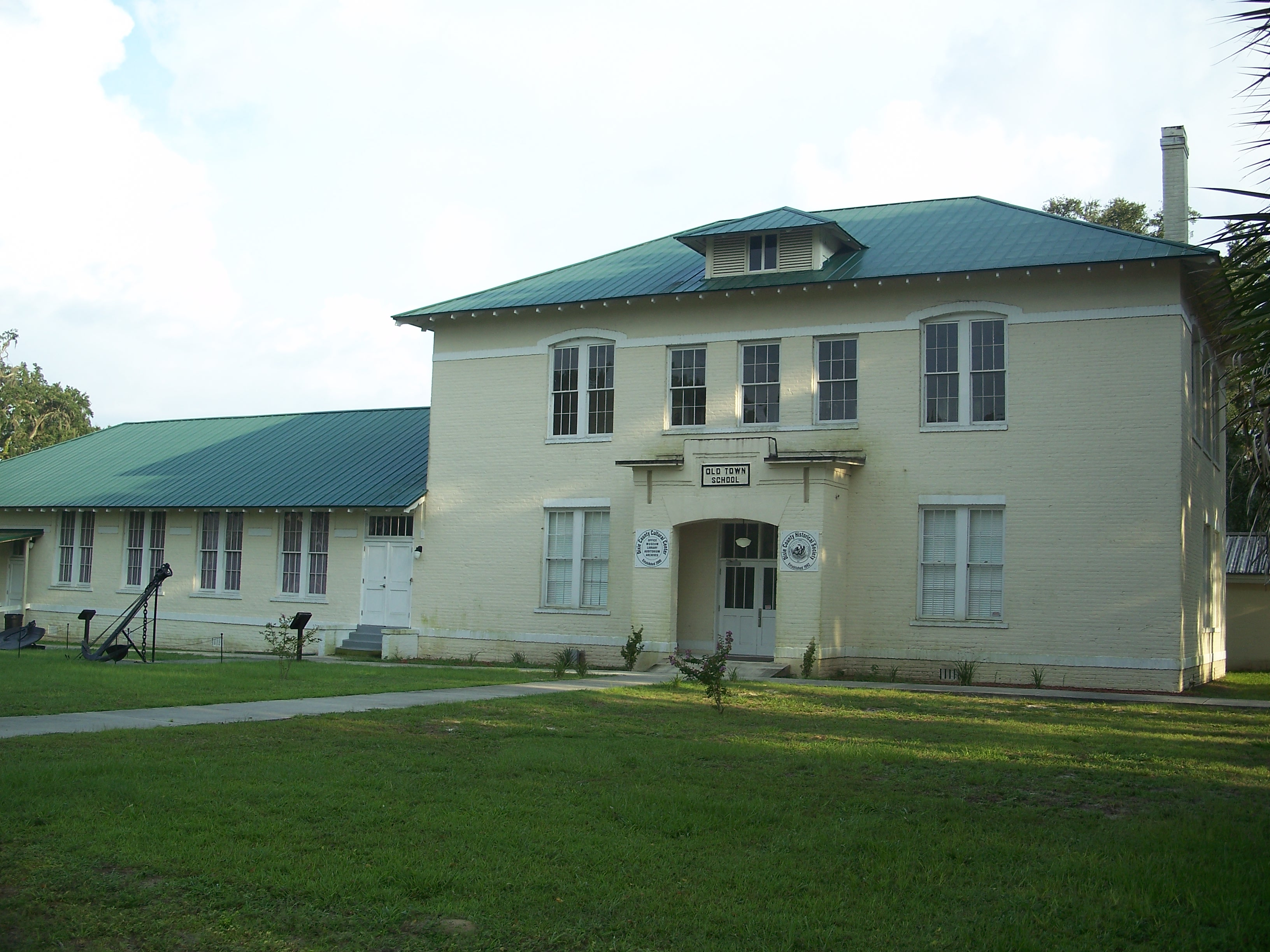
Old Town Elementary School

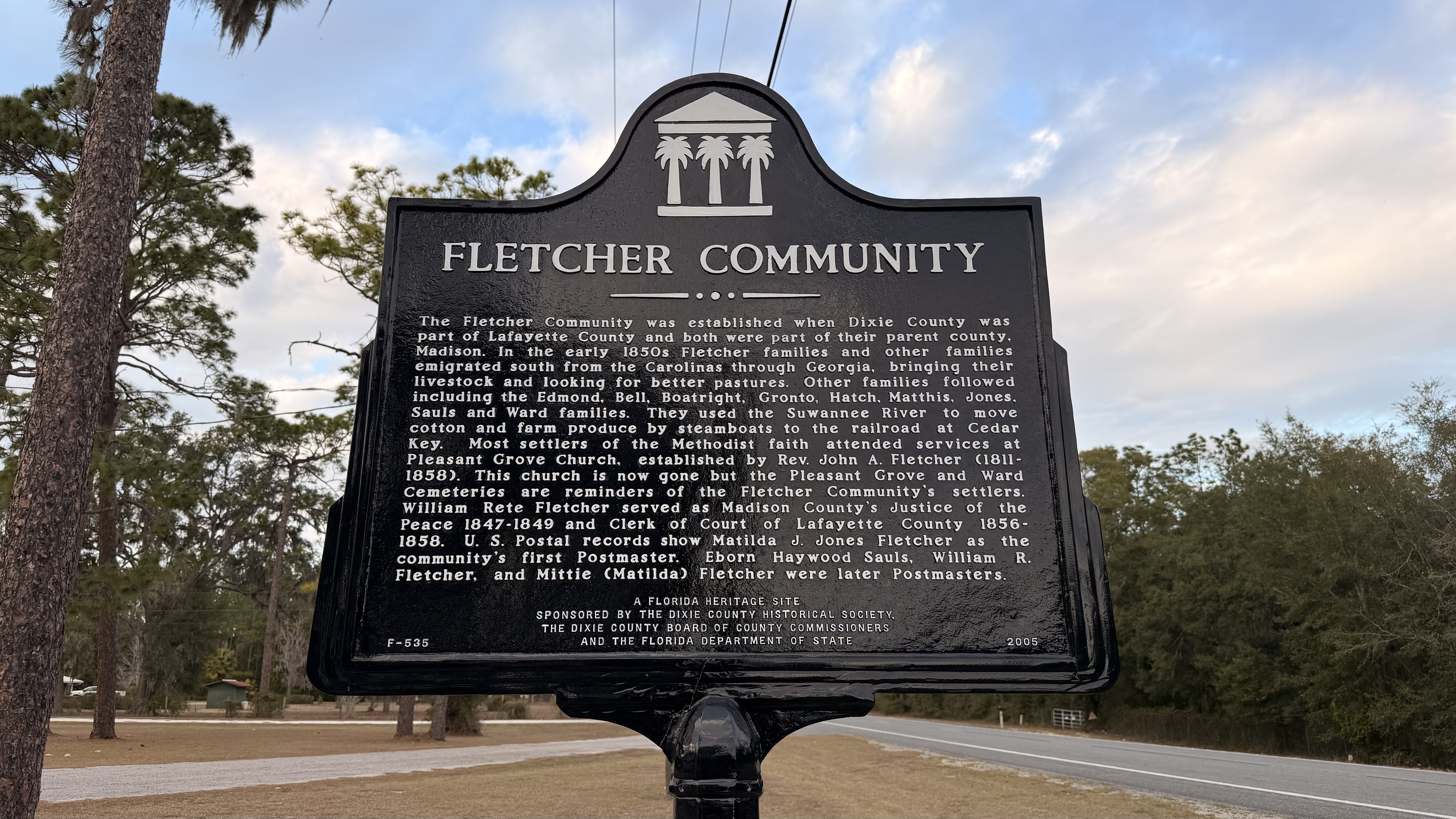
Florida Historical Marker No. 154

Old Town is an unincorporated community in Dixie County, Florida, United States, located at US 19–ALT 27-98 and State Road 349. The ZIP Code for Old Town is 32680.

== History ==
Old Town appears on an 1874 map, located on the west bank of the Suwannee River in what was then Lafayette County. Yet Old Town has been a settlement for much longer, being documented as the area where a Seminole principal chief named Bolek had his chief village, called Bowlegs Town, from 1813 to 1818.

=== Historic places ===
Historic places in Old Town include:

- City of Hawkinsville, a shipwreck in the Suwannee River, near the Nature Coast Trail State Park
- Old Town Methodist Church built in 1890, located behind the 1983 church building.
- Old Town Elementary School, now the Dixie County Cultural Center

== Geography ==
Old Town is located at 29°36′04″N 82°58′55″W (29.6011, -82.9819), about 40 miles southwest of Gainesville and 12 miles northwest of Chiefland.

== Medical care ==
For health care, Old Town has a small urgent-care center; but in emergencies, patients are airlifted to Gainesville hospitals. Physical therapy and other rehabilitative services are available in Chiefland.

== Education ==
Residents are served by Dixie District Schools. Old Town Elementary School is located in Old Town. Old Town is also served by secondary schools in Cross City: Ruth Rains Middle School, and Dixie County High School. The Mascot for Dixie County High School is the Bears.

== Economy ==
Old Town has an unemployment rate of 4.9%. The US average is 6.0%. The average income of an Old Town resident is $22,242 per year. The US average is $37,638 per year. The average Old Town household income is $44,616 per year. The US average household income is $69,021 per year.

== Climate ==
Old Town, Florida has a humid subtropical climate (Köppen Cfa) with some characteristics of a tropical monsoon climate (Am), with a defined rainy season from June through September.

== Notable residents ==
Guy Gabaldon, a US Marine and World War II hero who captured and/or persuaded 1,300 Japanese soldiers to surrender in the Pacific, a feat for which he was ultimately awarded the Navy Cross, retired to Old Town where he resided until his death in 2006 at the age of 80.
