= Aubrey Sherrod =

American basketball player

Personal information
- Born: November 6, 1962 (age 64) Wichita, Kansas, U.S.
- Listed height: 6 ft 4 in (1.93 m)
- Listed weight: 195 lb (88 kg)

Career information
- High school: Wichita Heights (Wichita, Kansas)
- College: Wichita State (1981–1985)
- NBA draft: 1985: 2nd round, 34th overall pick
- Drafted by: Chicago Bulls
- Playing career: 1985–1989
- Position: Shooting guard

Career history
- 1985–1986: Kansas City Sizzlers
- 1986–1987: Wyoming Wildcatters
- 1989: Geelong Supercats

Career highlights
- 3× Second-team All-MVC (1983–1985); McDonald's All-American Game Co-MVP (1981); Second-team Parade All-American (1981)
- Stats at Basketball Reference

Aubrey D. Sherrod (born November 6, 1962) is an American former professional basketball player. A left-handed shooting guard, he was considered one of the top prospects of his class, and was selected as Co-MVP of the 1981 McDonald's All-American Game alongside Adrian Branch. He then decided to stay in his hometown to play college basketball, and committed to Wichita State. After 4 years he was selected in the second round of the 1985 NBA draft by the Chicago Bulls, but was waived before the start of the season and had a short professional career in the Continental Basketball Association (CBA) and in Australia. He was inducted in the Wichita State Hall of Fame in 1994.

== High school career ==
Sherrod was born in Wichita, Kansas, the youngest of five brothers; his father died when he was 2 years old. Sherrod had an early growth spurt and in 2nd grade was already much taller than his peers: due to his height, his brother Avery invited him to join his team of 6th-graders. He decided to attend Wichita Heights High School, and he entered the varsity basketball team in his sophomore year. Under coach Charles "Goose" Doughty, JR (1933–2013), who Sherrod considered a father figure, in his junior year he averaged 24 points per game. He was considered a good defender and a smooth shooter.

In his senior year at Wichita Heights he averaged 27.5 points and 7.5 rebounds per game, being ranked among the top 2 guards in the country together with Michael Jordan, and one of the top players overall. During his high school career he was selected 3 times in the all-conference first team and scored 1,735 points, which ranked him second all-time in Wichita behind Greg Dreiling of Kapaun Mt. Carmel High School. His senior year earned him a selection in the Parade All-America Second Team and he was named a McDonald's All-American. In the 1981 McDonald's game, which was played in his hometown of Wichita, he scored 19 points, shooting 7/14 from the field and 5/6 from the free throw line: he shared MVP honors with Adrian Branch. He also played in another high school all-star game, the Capital Classic, where he wore jersey number 21 and was the top scorer with 20 points (9/13 from the field, 2/3 from the line), being named the game MVP.

== College career ==
Sherrod was heavily recruited by many colleges, and he restricted his final choice between Kansas State and Wichita State. He signed for Wichita State in June 1981, along with the other local high school star Greg Dreiling. He chose to wear jersey number 22 and he was selected as a starter for the team by coach Gene Smithson, replacing former shooting guard Randy Smithson who graduated in 1981. In his first year Sherrod averaged 11.0 points, 1.6 rebounds, 2.9 assists and 1.3 steals per game while shooting an efficient 50.7% from the field, and he recorded the best free throw percentage for a freshman in Wichita State history with 77.2% (the record has since been surpassed). He started all but 1 game (28 out of the 29 played that season) and averaged 26.5 minutes per game for a Wichita State team that ended the season with a 23–6 record.

In his sophomore year Sherrod found more playing time, and his scoring average increased to 14.4 points per game; he also recorded 2.8 rebounds, 3.4 assists and 1.2 steals while his shooting percentages slightly decreased. At the end of the season he was named in the All-Missouri Valley Conference Second Team. Wichita State ended the regular season with a 25–3 record (17–1 in conference play) and ranked 1st in the MVC, but Illinois State won the MVC tournament.

Sherrod's junior year saw him improve again in scoring, and in 30 games he averaged 15.3 points, 3.2 rebounds and 2.7 assists, with a career-high in steals per game (1.4) and blocks per game (0.3). He also recorded a career-high 30 points on February 6, 1984, against West Texas State, and was selected in the All-MVC Second Team for the second year in a row. Wichita State finished with a 18–12 record (11–5 in the MVC), ranking third in the conference.

In his senior season, Sherrod was second in the team in scoring (behind Xavier McDaniel) and he averaged 18.5 points, 3.3 rebounds, 4.1 assists and 1.1 steals while shooting 51.1% from the field and 85.6% from the line. He recorded a career-high 31 points against Tulsa on March 2, 1985, shooting 11/15 from the field and 9/10 from the free throw line. He also recorded 11 assists on January 16, 1985, against Indiana State: it was a personal career high and one of the top assists performances in Wichita State history. For the third consecutive year Sherrod was selected in the All-MVC Second Team and Wichita State won the MVC Tournament after finishing the regular season with a 11–5 conference record (18–13 overall). The team then qualified for the 1985 NCAA Division I men's basketball tournament, where they were eliminated by Georgia in the first round.

Sherrod ended his college career at Wichita State placing 6th in scoring with 1,765 points, 5th in assists with 384, and he was the all-time steals leader with 148 (he has since been surpassed).

=== College statistics ===
Year	Team	GP	GS	MPG	FG%	3P%	FT%	RPG	APG	SPG	BPG	PPG
1981–82	Wichita State	29	28	26.5	.507	–	.772	1.6	2.9	1.3	0.1	11.0
1982–83	Wichita State	27	27	32.1	.494	–	.737	2.8	3.4	1.2	0.2	14.4
1983–84	Wichita State	30	30	35.3	.464	–	.676	3.2	2.7	1.4	0.3	15.3
1984–85	Wichita State	31	31	36.8	.511	–	.856	3.3	4.1	1.1	0.1	18.5
Career		117	116	32.8	.493	–	.763	2.7	3.3	1.3	0.2	14.9

== Professional career ==
After the end of his college career Sherrod was automatically eligible for the NBA draft. In the 1985 draft he was selected in the 2nd round with the 10th pick (34th overall) by the Chicago Bulls. He joined the team for the preseason but was waived in October 1985, being the last player to be cut just before the start of the 1985–86 NBA season. The Bulls already had a young shooting guard in Michael Jordan, who they had selected 3rd overall in the 1984 NBA draft. After being cut from the Bulls, Sherrod signed for the Kansas City Sizzlers of the Continental Basketball Association, but due to an ankle injury he was unable to join the team until December 1985. In the 1985–86 CBA season he played 37 games, averaging 12.5 points, 1.4 rebounds, 3.1 assists and 0.9 steals in 23.7 minutes per game, with a 3-point shooting percentage of 36%. He played 4 games in the playoffs, averaging 14.3 points.

In September 1986 he signed with the Seattle SuperSonics, but did not make the final roster for the 1986–87 NBA season and joined the Wyoming Wildcatters in the CBA. In 25 games with the team he averaged 7.8 points, 1.0 rebound and 2.3 assists while shooting 44% from the field (36.7% from three).

In December 1987 he was selected in the inaugural IBA draft; however this league, restricted to players 6-4 and shorter, never started. He then played one season in the Australian National Basketball League with the Geelong Supercats in 1989, recording averages of 22.6 points, 4.7 rebounds, 3.4 assists and 2.0 steals while shooting 46.6% from the field (38.3% from three).
