= 1981 McDonald's All-American Boys Game =

American high school basketball game

East	West
96	95
	1st half	2nd half	Total
East	49	47	96
West	43	52	95
- Date: April 11, 1981
- Venue: Levitt Arena, Wichita, KS
- MVP: Adrian Branch and Aubrey Sherrod
- Referees: 1; 2; 3
- Attendance: 10,006

McDonald's All-American

The 1981 McDonald's All-American Boys Game was an All-star basketball game played on Saturday, April 11, 1981, at the Levitt Arena in Wichita, Kansas. The game's rosters featured the best and most highly recruited high school boys graduating in 1981. The game was the 4th annual version of the McDonald's All-American Game first played in 1978.

== 1981 game ==
The game was not televised, but highlights were aired by NBC Sports during Sportsworld on April 12. The East roster included the best big man in the 1981 class, Patrick Ewing (who did not play in this game), guard Michael Jordan and forward Chris Mullin. The West team could count on local stars Greg Dreiling, a 7-1 center who averaged 26.7 points for his high school team, and guard Aubrey Sherrod, the only player who was still undecided regarding his college choice. Both players went on to attend Wichita State. The West team also had more size, having 7 players standing 6-9 or taller, while the East had two of the best guards, Jordan and Milt Wagner. The game started at 8 PM and initially saw the West team take the lead, with the East team scoring their first points on a Jordan jumpshot with 7:54 minutes left in the first quarter. Jordan's basket started a 10-point run for the East, which outscored the West 21-12 in the first quarter. The second quarter ended 31-28 in favor of the West team, and at halftime the score was East 49, West 43. The East kept the lead until the fourth quarter, when the West went ahead 81-80 on a Hurt layup with 6:34 left. Aubrey Sherrod scored on a jumpshot with 22 seconds remaining, and the score was West 95, East 94. When the East regained possession of the ball, Jordan was fouled, and scored both free throws bringing the score to 96-95 for the East team. The West could win the game but Mark Acres missed the decisive free throw, shooting it short, and the game ended with the East win. Jordan set a new scoring record with 30 points on 13/19 shooting (4/4 from the free throw line): the record lasted for 18 years, until the 1999 game when Jonathan Bender scored 31 points. Despite Jordan's scoring effort, the MVP award went to Adrian Branch and Aubrey Sherrod. Of the 25 players, 14 went on to play at least 1 game in the NBA.

=== East roster ===
No.	Name	Height	Weight	Position	Hometown	High school	College of Choice
15	Jeff Adkins	6-5	–	G	Martinsville, VA, U.S.	Martinsville	Maryland
20	Chris Mullin	6-6	–	F	Brooklyn, NY, U.S.	Xaverian	St. John's
21	Milt Wagner	6-5	–	G	Camden, NJ, U.S.	Camden	Louisville
22	Buzz Peterson	6-4	–	G	Asheville, NC, U.S.	Asheville	North Carolina
23	Michael Jordan	6-5	192	G	Wilmington, NC, U.S.	Emsley A. Laney	North Carolina
24	Adrian Branch	6-8	–	G	Hyattsville, MD, U.S.	DeMatha	Maryland
25	Manuel Forrest	6-7	–	F	Louisville, KY, U.S.	Moore	Louisville
30	Bill Wennington	7-0	–	C	Brooklyn, NY, U.S.	Long Island Lutheran	St. John's
32	Eugene McDowell	6-8	–	C	Cross City, FL, U.S.	Dixie County	Florida
33	Patrick Ewing	7-0	–	C	Cambridge, MA, U.S.	Rindge and Latin	Georgetown
N/A	Anthony Jones	6-6	–	G	Washington, D.C., U.S.	Dunbar	Georgetown
N/A	Ed Pinckney	6-9	–	F	Bronx, NY, U.S.	Adlai E. Stevenson	Villanova

=== West roster ===
No.	Name	Height	Weight	Position	Hometown	High school	College of Choice
10	Eric Turner	6-3	–	G	Flint, MI, U.S.	Central	Michigan
11	Sam Vincent	6-2	–	G	Lansing, MI, U.S.	Eastern	Michigan State
14	Michael Payne	6-11	–	F	Quincy, IL, U.S.	Quincy Senior	Iowa
15	Dwayne Polee	6-5	–	G	Los Angeles, CA, U.S.	Manual Arts	UNLV
20	Ennis Whatley	6-3	–	G	Birmingham, AL, U.S.	Phillips	Alabama
21	Mark Acres	6-10	–	F	Palos Verdes Estates, CA, U.S.	Palos Verdes	Oral Roberts
22	Aubrey Sherrod	6-4	–	G	Wichita, KS, U.S.	Wichita Heights	Undecided
24	Stuart Gray	7-0	–	C	Granada Hills, CA, U.S.	John F. Kennedy	UCLA
25	Nigel Miguel	6-5	–	G	Sherman Oaks, CA, U.S.	Notre Dame	UCLA
31	Walter Downing	6-9	–	C	New Lenox, IL, U.S.	Providence Catholic	DePaul
32	Bobby Lee Hurt	6-9	–	C	Huntsville, AL, U.S.	S. R. Butler	Alabama
33	Greg Dreiling	7-1	–	C	Wichita, KS, U.S.	Kapaun Mt. Carmel	Wichita State
N/A	John Flowers	6-9	–	F	Fort Wayne, IN, U.S.	South Side	Indiana

=== Coaches ===
The East team was coached by:

- Head Coach Mike Jarvis of Rindge and Latin High School (Cambridge, Massachusetts)

The West team was coached by:

- Head Coach Jim Yerkovich of Judge Memorial Catholic High School (Salt Lake City, Utah)
- Asst Coach Sonny Tangaro of Judge Memorial Catholic High School (Salt Lake City, Utah)
