= Nick Collins =

American football player (born 1983)

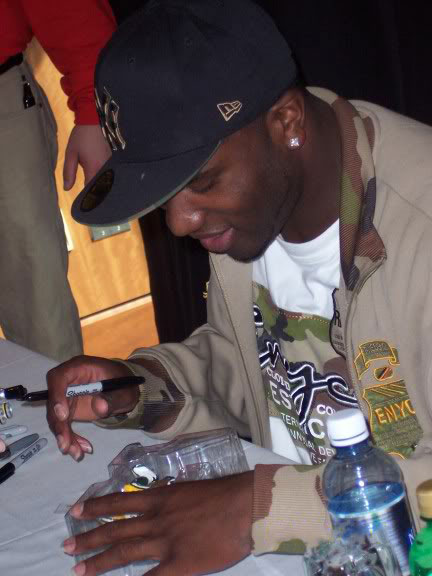
- Collins in 2006

No. 36
- Position: Safety

Personal information
- Born: August 16, 1983 (age 43); Gainesville, Florida, U.S.
- Listed height: 5 ft 11 in (1.80 m)
- Listed weight: 207 lb (94 kg)

Career information
- High school: Dixie County (Cross City, Florida)
- College: Bethune–Cookman (2002–2004)
- NFL draft: 2005: 2nd round, 51st overall pick

Career history
- Green Bay Packers (2005–2011)

Awards and highlights
- Super Bowl champion (XLV); 3× Second-team All-Pro (2008–2010); 3× Pro Bowl (2008–2010); PFWA All-Rookie Team (2005); Green Bay Packers Hall of Fame

Career NFL statistics
- Total tackles: 415
- Sacks: 1
- Forced fumbles: 6
- Pass deflections: 68
- Interceptions: 21
- Defensive touchdowns: 5
- Stats at Pro Football Reference

Nicholas Cordell Collins (born August 16, 1983) is an American former professional football player who was a safety for seven seasons with the Green Bay Packers of the National Football League (NFL). He played college football for the Bethune-Cookman Wildcats, and was selected by the Packers in the second round of the 2005 NFL draft. Collins led the league in interceptions returned for touchdowns and interception return yards in the 2008 season. In Super Bowl XLV, he intercepted Ben Roethlisberger for a touchdown as the Packers beat the Pittsburgh Steelers, 31–25.

In 2011, Collins suffered a career-ending neck injury. He was officially released by the Packers in 2012, and formally announced his retirement in 2014. Collins was inducted into the Green Bay Packers Hall of Fame in 2016.

== Early life ==
Collins was a diverse athlete during his high school career. He attended Dixie County High School in Cross City, Florida, and lettered twice as a quarterback, running back and defensive back. Collins was also given first-team all-conference honors and was named team MVP as a senior. Collins also earned two letters as a basketball guard and three letters as a center fielder in baseball.

== College career ==
He was a student athlete at Bethune–Cookman University in Daytona Beach, Florida, where he played for the Bethune–Cookman Wildcats football team.

In 2002, Collins spent the majority of the season as a reserve linebacker. He played in all thirteen games of the season, making his first two starts in the final two games of the season at the strong safety position. Collins finished the season with 35 tackles (22 solo), one interception, five defended passes, one fumble recovery and eight kickoff returns for 181 yards. His strongest statistical performance of the season was an eight-tackle game in his first start, against Florida A&M University, on November 23.

Collins became a full-time starter at free safety for the Bethune–Cookman Wildcats in 2003. He started 11 of the season's 12 games, missing only a November 15 contest against Howard University. Collins had a breakout season in 2003, leading the Mid-Eastern Athletic Conference in interceptions with six and finished third in the conference in passes defended with 13. He also contributed 54 tackles (33 solo), a fumble recovery, and the first defensive touchdown of his college career (intercepting a pass by Norfolk State University quarterback Willie Mitchell and returning it 45 yards for the score). He was an all-conference selection for the season.

As a senior in 2004, Collins was an Associated Press third-team Division I-AA All-America selection and first-team All-MEAC honors at the free safety position. He once again led the conference with six interceptions, led his team in solo tackles (34) and passes defended (13), and scored the second and final defensive touchdown of his collegiate career. Collins had an interception in each of the first four games of the 2004 season. He had a memorable performance in the final game of his college career, intercepting FAMU quarterback Ben Dougherty at the Bethune–Cookman 8 yard line with only 1:49 left in regulation, sending the game into overtime and to an eventual 58–52 double overtime Bethune–Cookman victory.

== Professional career ==
Pre-draft measurables
Height	Weight	Arm length	Hand span	40-yard dash	10-yard split	20-yard split	20-yard shuttle	Three-cone drill	Vertical jump	Broad jump	Bench press
5 ft 11 1/8 in (1.81 m)	206 lb (93 kg)	31 in (0.79 m)	8 1/2 in (0.22 m)	4.49 s	1.64 s	2.65 s	4.16 s	6.94 s	40.0 in (1.02 m)	9 ft 10 in (3.00 m)	11 reps
All values from NFL Combine

=== 2005 ===
The Green Bay Packers selected Collins in the second round (51st pick overall) of the 2005 NFL draft. Collins would become only the second Bethune-Cookman player to make the Packers roster. Many draft analysts immediately labeled the selection a "major reach" by the Packers due to Collins third to fifth round projection. NFL draft expert Mel Kiper Jr. also labeled Collins a reach by the Packers and stated, "Corner Nick Collins is a good athlete but very raw and was a reach in the second round."

On August 2, 2005, the Green Bay Packers signed Collins to a five-year, $3.76 million contract that includes $896,100 guaranteed and a signing bonus of $361,040.

Green Bay Packers' GM Ted Thompson drafted Collins in hopes of him eventually becoming the Packers' starting free safety after Darren Sharper vacated the role when he was granted his release and signed with the NFC North rival Minnesota Vikings. Throughout training camp, Collins competed against Earl Little, Arturo Freeman, and Marviel Underwood for a job as a starting safety. Head coach Mike Sherman named Collins the starting free safety to start the regular season, alongside strong safety Mark Roman.

He made his professional regular season debut and first career start in the Green Bay Packers' season-opener at the Detroit Lions and made one tackle in their 17–3 loss. On November 21, 2005, he collected 11 combined tackles (eight solo), two pass deflections, and made his first career interception off a pass by quarterback Daunte Culpepper during a 20–17 loss to the Minnesota Vikings in Week 11. In Week 15, Collins made a season-high 12 combined tackles (11 solo) and a pass deflection in a 48–3 loss at the Baltimore Ravens. He completed his rookie season in 2005 with a career-high 84 combined tackles (63 solo), seven passes defensed, two forced fumbles, and an interception in 16 games and 16 starts.

=== 2006 ===
On January 2, 2006, Packers' GM Ted Thompson fired head coach Mike Sherman after the Packers finished with a 4–12 record in 2005. Collins entered training camp slated as the starting free safety. Head coach Mike McCarthy officially named Collins the starter to begin the regular season, opposite starting strong safety Marquand Manuel.

In Week 2, Collins collected a season-high eight solo tackles in a 34–27 loss to the New Orleans Saints. On December 3, 2006, he recorded a season-high nine combined tackles in the Packers' 38–10 loss to the New York Jets in Week 13. On December 31, 2006, Collins made six solo tackles, a season-high three pass deflections, two interceptions, and scored his first career touchdown in a 26–7 victory at the Chicago Bears in Week 17. He intercepted a pass attempt by quarterback Brian Griese and returned for a 55-yard touchdown in the first quarter. The touchdown marked the first pick six of his career. Collins completed the 2006 season with 80 combined tackles (65 solo), ten pass deflections, three interceptions, two forced fumbles, and a touchdown in 16 games and 16 starts.

=== 2007 ===
He retained his job as the starting free safety to begin 2007, alongside strong safety Atari Bigby. In Week 2, Collins collected a season-high five solo tackles during a 35–13 victory at the New York Giants. He was inactive, for the first time in his career, for three games (Weeks 11–13) after injuring his knee. He finished the season with 46 combined tackles (40 solo) and five pass deflections in 13 games and 13 starts.

The Green Bay Packers finished the 2007 season first in the NFC North with a 13–3 record and earned a first round bye and home-field advantage throughout the playoffs. On January 12, 2008, Collins started in his first career playoff game and recorded four solo tackles in the Packers' 42–20 victory against the Seattle Seahawks in the NFC Divisional Round. The following week, he made another four solo tackles as the Packers were eliminated from the playoffs after being defeated 23–20 by the New York Giants in the NFC Championship Game.

=== 2008 ===
Head coach Mike McCarthy retained Collins and Atari Bigby as the starting safeties to start the 2008 season. On September 14, 2008, Collins recorded two combined tackles, a pass deflection, and returned an interception by quarterback Jon Kitna for a 42-yard touchdown in Week 2 48–25 victory over the Detroit Lions. In Week 4, Collins made seven combined tackles, broke up a pass, and made an interception in a 31–20 loss at the Tampa Bay Buccaneers. The following week, he collected a season-high eight combined tackles in the Packers' 27–24 loss to the Atlanta Falcons in Week 5. In a Week 6 34–14 blowout win over the Indianapolis Colts, he intercepted a pass by quarterback Peyton Manning in the third quarter and returned it for his second touchdown of the season. On October 19, 2008, he made a tackle, a season-high two pass deflections, and returned an interception for a 59-yard touchdown in a 28–27 loss at the Minnesota Vikings in Week 10. He scored his touchdown after intercepting a pass by Gus Frerotte and returning it for his third pick six of the season as well as his career. On December 17, 2008, it was announced that Collins was voted to the 2009 Pro Bowl to mark his first Pro Bowl selection of his career. Collins ended the season with 72 combined tackles (60 solo), a career-high 15 pass deflections, career-high seven interceptions, three touchdowns, and a forced fumble in 16 games and 16 starts. He led the league with three pick sixes and 295 interception return yards in 2008.

=== 2009 ===
Collins was unsatisfied with his contract for the upcoming season and opted to skip organized team activities, but attended mandatory minicamp. On January 5, 2009, the Green Bay Packers fired defensive coordinator Bob Sanders and five other defensive coaches. The defense failed to hold on to multiple fourth quarter leads throughout 2008 and were the main cause of the Packers finishing with a 6–10 record. The Green Bay Packers' new defensive coordinator, Dom Capers, opted to retain Collins and Bigby as the starting safeties to begin 2009.

On September 20, 2009, Collins recorded a season-high seven combined tackles and a pass deflection in a 31–24 loss to the Cincinnati Bengals in Week 2. In Week 10, he collected five combined tackles, deflected two passes, and made his first career sack on quarterback Tony Romo during a 17–7 win against the Dallas Cowboys. On December 13, 2009, he made four combined tackles, broke up two passes, and an interception in the Packers' 21–14 victory at the Chicago Bears in Week 14. His interception extended his streak to four consecutive games with an interception. On December 30, 2009, it was announced that Collins was one of three safeties to be named to the NFC roster for the 2010 Pro Bowl. He completed the 2009 season with 53 combined tackles (44 solo), 13 pass deflections, six interceptions, and a sack in 16 games and 16 starts.

The Green Bay Packers finished second in the NFC North with an 11–5 record and earned a wildcard berth. On January 10, 2010, Collins collected nine solo tackles during a 51–45 overtime loss at the Arizona Cardinals in the NFC Wildcard Game.

=== 2010 ===
On March 4, 2010, the Green Bay Packers placed the highest possible restricted free agent tender on Collins, to ensure they would be compensated if he signed with another team. Any team that would sign Collins would be required to give a first and third round selection in return. On March 9, 2010, Collins signed his one-year, $3.49 million restricted free agent tender. Collins's agent stated his client chose to immediately sign the contract as a gesture of good faith in possible negotiations for a long-term deal. On March 12, 2010, the Green Bay Packers signed Collins to a four-year, $26.75 million contract that includes $14 million guaranteed and a signing bonus of $4 million.

Head coach Mike McCarthy named Collins the starting free safety to start the 2010 season, opposite rookie strong safety Morgan Burnett. On November 21, 2010, Collins collected a season-high nine combined tackles during a 31–3 win at the Minnesota Vikings in Week 11. On December 28, 2010, Collins was voted to the 2011 Pro Bowl, making it his third consecutive selection. In Week 17, he made three combined tackles, a pass deflection, and intercepted pass by quarterback Jay Cutler 10–3 victory against the Chicago Bears. It marked his second consecutive game with an interception. He completed the 2010 season with 70 combined tackles (59 solo), 12 passes defensed, and four interceptions in 16 games and 16 starts.

The Green Bay Packers finished second in the NFC North with a 10–6 record and clinched a wildcard berth. The Packers went on to defeat the Philadelphia Eagles 21–16 in the NFC Wildcard Game and earned a 48–21 victory at the Atlanta Falcons in the NFC Divisional Round. On January 23, 2011, Collins recorded seven solo tackles as the Packers won 21–14 at the Chicago Bears in the NFC Championship Game. On February 6, 2011, Collins started in Super Bowl XLV and recorded four solo tackles, a pass deflection, and returned an interception for a touchdown as the Packers defeated the Pittsburgh Steelers to win Super Bowl XLV. He returned an interception by quarterback Ben Roethlisberger for a 37-yard touchdown in the first quarter to give the Packers a 14–0 lead, and after the play, Collins was flagged for excessive celebration, awarding the Steelers an extra 15 yards following the kickoff. He was ranked 96th by his fellow players on the NFL Top 100 Players of 2011.

=== 2011 ===
Collins and Burnett returned as the starting safety duo to begin the 2011 regular season. He started in the Green Bay Packers' season-opener against the New Orleans Saints and collected a season-high eight combined tackles during a 42–34 victory. On September 18, 2011, Collins was carted off the field on a stretcher in the fourth quarter and was immediately taken to the hospital after sustaining a neck injury while attempting to tackle Panthers running back Jonathan Stewart. Collins went in to make a routine tackle but when Stewart went to hurdle Collins he didn't get a complete hurdle. The crown of Collins head collided with Stewart's tailbone and Collins’ neck was compressed resulting in serious injury. He spent the night at the hospital and returned to Green Bay the next day, where it was announced that Collins would miss the remainder of the 2011 season. Collins had suffered a herniated disk in his neck, and underwent single-level cervical fusion surgery.

=== 2012 ===
On April 25, 2012, Green Bay decided to release Collins from the team citing concerns about his ability to return to football after suffering such a severe neck injury. On September 28, 2012, Collins' agent, Alan Herman, announced that his neck injury would most likely end his football career.

On August 20, 2014, Collins officially announced his retirement from the NFL via Twitter.

== NFL career statistics ==
Legend
	Won the Super Bowl
	Led the league
**Bold**	Career high

=== Regular season ===
Year	Team	GP	Tackles				Fumbles			Interceptions					
Year	Team	GP	Cmb	Solo	Ast	Sck	FF	FR	Yds	Int	Yds	Avg	Lng	TD	PD
2005	GB	16	84	63	21	0.0	2	0	0	1	0	0.0	0	0	8
2006	GB	16	82	67	15	0.0	2	0	0	3	68	22.7	55	1	13
2007	GB	13	46	40	6	0.0	0	0	0	0	0	0.0	0	0	5
2008	GB	16	72	60	12	0.0	1	0	0	**7**	**295**	**42.1**	**62**	**3**	15
2009	GB	16	53	44	9	1.0	0	2	4	6	110	18.3	31	0	13
2010	GB	16	70	59	11	0.0	0	2	26	4	34	8.5	24	0	12
2011	GB	2	12	9	3	0.0	1	0	0	0	0	0.0	0	0	1
Career		95	419	342	77	1.0	6	4	30	21	507	24.1	62	4	67

== Personal life ==
Collins and his wife Andrea live in Orlando, Florida. While in college, Collins volunteered at elementary schools and at the YMCA in Daytona Beach. He has also been an instructor at a passing camp for children ages 6 to 15. He has a daughter named Jenajah, and four sons, Nicholas Jr., Nmar'e, Nash, and Nixon.

He has coached high school football as a Defensive backs coach for Lake Highland Preparatory School, where he helped win them back-to-back-to-back championships in 2021 and 2022.

His son Nicholas Jr. was an All-State defensive back as a freshman on the 2022 Lake Highland championship team and had already received an offer to play at his father's and grandfather's collegiate alma mater, Bethune-Cookman.

After the 2022 high school football season, Collins returned to Bethune-Cookman to become its cornerbacks coach.

Collins' father, Willie Collins, who had been a college quarterback, died of cancer in 2009. “He was my best friend," the younger Collins said of his father. "There was no pressure (from him). That’s one thing I can say about my father. He never put pressure on me. He did bring the best out of me. He always knew I was a self-directed type of kid and I wanted to do things my way. He made sure I stayed on track of my goals.”
