= Eddie Kriwiel =

American football and golf coach (1926–2007)

Biographical details
- Born: September 8, 1926
- Died: December 2, 2007 (aged 81)

Playing career
- 1947–1950: Wichita
- Position: Quarterback

Coaching career (HC unless noted)
- 1954–1967: Wichita West HS (KS)
- 1968: Wichita State
- 1969–1990: Kapaun Mt. Carmel HS (KS)

Head coaching record
- Overall: 0–10 (college)

Accomplishments and honors

Awards
- Kansas Sports Hall of Fame

Edward Adam Kriwiel (September 8, 1926 – December 2, 2007) was an American football and golf coach. A member of seven Kansas halls of fame, Kriwiel was a figurehead in state high school sports for many years.

== Playing career ==
=== High school ===
At Tilden Tech High School, a public school in Chicago, Kriwiel was the captain of the undefeated high school football team. They won the Chicago City Championship, pitting the champions of the public school league against the champions of the private school league in front of 68,000 fans at Soldier Field. Four of his high school teammates went on to play at Notre Dame for Frank Leahy, but it was Kriwiel who was named “Most Valuable Player” of the team.

=== College ===
Kriwiel attended the Municipal University of Wichita—now Wichita State University—in 1947, where he started for the Shockers at quarterback. He holds several school records, and he led the Shockers to Raisin Bowl and Camellia Bowl appearances. He was inducted into the Kansas Sports Hall of Fame in 2004.

== Coaching career ==
=== Wichita State ===
Kriwiel was the 28th head football coach at Wichita State University and he held that position for the 1968 season, leading the Shockers to an 0–10 record.

=== High school football ===
Kriwiel was more successful at the high school ranks. Prior to coaching at Wichita State, Kriwiel was the head coach at Wichita West High School for 14 years, leaving there with a 33-game winning streak. After coaching in college, Kriwiel spent the rest of his career coaching football and golf and serving as the athletic director at Kapaun Mt. Carmel High School in Wichita. Kriwiel won 297 games as a high school football coach and his teams had just two losing seasons in 36 years. His teams played in 12 state championship games and won 9.

=== High school golf ===
Kriwiel was also highly successful as a high school golf coach at Kapaun-Mt. Carmel. Since 1969 his teams won 20 state titles and 28 top-four finishes. While unofficial, this is believed by many to be a national record.

== Head coaching record ==
=== College ===
Year	Team	Overall	Conference	Standing	Bowl/playoffs
Wichita State Shockers (Missouri Valley Conference) (1968)
1968	Wichita State	0–10	0–5	5th	
Wichita State:		0–10	0–5		
Total:		0–10			
