= Wichita West High School =

Location
- 820 South Osage Street; Wichita, Kansas 67213; United States
- 37.673317°N 97.347942°W

Information
- School type: Public, High School
- Established: 1953
- School board: www.usd259.org/boe
- School district: Wichita USD 259
- CEEB code: 173209
- Principal: Daren Hammond
- Teaching staff: 90.13 (FTE)
- Grades: 9 to 12
- Gender: coed
- Enrollment: 1,390 (2023-2024)
- Student to teacher ratio: 15.42
- Campus type: Urban
- Colors: Maroon; Gold
- Athletics: Class 5A
- Athletics conference: Greater Wichita Athletic League
- Mascot: Pioneers
- Rival: Wichita South
- Newspaper: The West Word
- Yearbook: West High Trail
- Communities served: Wichita
- Website: west.usd259.org

Wichita West High School, known locally as West, is a public secondary school in Wichita, Kansas, United States. It is operated by Wichita USD 259 school district and serves students in grades 9 to 12. The high school is located southwest of downtown Wichita and near U.S. Route 54.

== History ==
Wichita West High School opened in September 1953, but a council had started looking to build a high school for the westside of the Arkansas River in 1925. Three years after its opening, Wichita West added 25 classrooms with an addition of 24 mobile units 15 years later. In 1976, a new library was added to the building with the existing library being renovated. Renovations again took place in 1988 and 1989, due to the school district moving the ninth grade to the high schools.

== Extracurricular activities ==
=== Athletics ===
Wichita West won city league titles in football in 1993 and 1995.

=== State championships ===
State Championships
Season	Sport/Activity	Number of Championships	Year
Fall	Cross Country, Boys'	1	1971
Fall	Football	1	1965
Winter	Wrestling	2	1994, 2001
Winter	Basketball, Boys'	1	1982
Winter	Swimming and Diving, Boys'	2	1956, 1957
Spring	Golf, Boys'	2	1967, 1972
Spring	Track and field, Boys'	1	1972
Spring	Baseball	3	1959, 1967, 1969
Total		13	

== Notable people ==
=== Alumni ===
- Robert Beattie, writer, lawyer, and educator
- Karla Burns, operatic mezzo-soprano and actress

=== Faculty ===
- Eddie Kriwiel, football and golf coach, member of 7 Kansas Halls of Fame

== See also ==
- Education in Kansas
- List of high schools in Kansas
- List of unified school districts in Kansas
