= Eugene McDowell =

American basketball player

Personal information
- Born: December 31, 1963 Cross City, Florida
- Died: August 24, 1995 (aged 31) Orlando, Florida
- Listed height: 6 ft 8 in (2.03 m)
- Listed weight: 230 lb (104 kg)

Career information
- High school: Dixie County (Cross City, Florida)
- College: Florida (1981–1985)
- NBA draft: 1985: 3rd round, 68th overall pick
- Drafted by: Milwaukee Bucks
- Playing career: 1985–1992
- Position: Power forward / center

Career history
- 1985–1986: Napoli Basket
- 1986–1987: CB Zaragoza
- 1987–1988: Barcelona
- 1988–1989: Cajabilbao
- 1989–1990: Çukurova Sanayi
- 1990–1991: Paşabahçe
- 1991: Pensacola Tornados
- 1991–1992: Birmingham Bandits

Career highlights
- Spanish League champion (1988); Spanish King's Cup winner (1988); AP Honorable Mention All-American (1985); First team All-SEC (1985); 2× Third team All-SEC (1983, 1984); McDonald's All-American (1981); Third-team Parade All-American (1981)
- Stats at Basketball Reference

Eugene McDowell (December 31, 1963 – August 24, 1995) was an American professional basketball player. A strong big man who primarily played as a center, he was one of the top prospects in the 1981 high school class. He was a 4-year starter playing college basketball for the Florida Gators, and he was a 3rd-round pick in the 1985 NBA draft; however, he never played in the NBA and he had a 7-year career playing professional basketball in Europe (Italy, Spain and Turkey) and in the CBA. He died in 1995 of an enlarged heart. He was inducted in the SEC Hall of Fame in 2009.

== High school career ==
McDowell was born in Cross City, Florida, and at birth the doctors found his leg bones to be too soft to correctly sustain his body, and they had him use braces in order to move: the physicians predicted that he would not be able to walk without them. However, McDowell managed to gain enough strength to move without braces, and by the age of 15 he was already playing basketball at a good level. He attended Dixie County High School, where he was a first team all-state selection in his junior and senior year: he was considered by several scouts to be the best player in the state of Florida.

In his senior year he missed 8 games due to a foot injury, and he averaged 26 points, 20 rebounds and 4 blocks per game. His successful senior season earned him a selection in the Parade All-America Third Team and he was named a McDonald's All-American. In the 1981 McDonald's game, which was played in Wichita, Kansas, he scored 8 points, shooting 4/7 from the field. He also played in another high school all-star game, the Capital Classic, where he scored 4 points (2/7 shooting).

== College career ==
McDowell was recruited by Auburn, Florida State, Minnesota, Oregon and South Alabama, but in March 1981 he signed a letter of intent with Florida. Coach Norm Sloan regarded McDowell as a promising player who could help the team with his ability to score in the paint. At Florida McDowell wore jersey number 40, and chose to major in broadcasting. Coach Sloan selected McDowell as the starting center since his freshman year: he played 27 games, averaging 33.2 minutes of playing time. He finished the season with 9.9 points per game, along with 8.8 rebounds and 1.3 blocks, leading the team in rebounds and blocks. Florida had a negative season overall, finishing last in the SEC with a 2–16 record in conference play.

McDowell's sophomore season was arguably the best of his college career. He scored a career-high 40 points in a 92–72 win against Biscayne on December 21, 1982, he recorded one of the best field goal percentages in SEC history when he shot 92.9% from the field (13 for 14) against Mississippi State, and he also led the SEC for field goal percentage with .646 (only the second sophomore to do so after Bernard King did in 1976). He ended his season with averages of 16.5 points, 8.5 rebounds, 1.1 assists and 1.5 blocks, and he was selected in the All-SEC third team. McDowell was the top shot blocker of his team, and the second scorer and rebounder behind Ronnie Williams The Gators finished last in the SEC for the second year in a row with a 5–13 conference record.

In his junior season McDowell experienced a slight decrease in his scoring, which dropped to 12.4 points per game, but he was the best rebounder of the team with a 9.2 average, and he was also the player with the highest minutes per game average. He was selected in the All-SEC third team for the second consecutive year, and the team had a better result, finishing third in the SEC with a 11–7 record. McDowell's last year of college basketball saw his best numbers in rebounds (9.8) and assists (3.1), and he played a team-high 36.4 minutes per game. At the end of the season he was named in the All-SEC first team and he was an AP Honorable Mention All-American.

His 43 career double-doubles are a Florida record, and he was the second player in the program history to reach 1,000 rebounds. Starting all his 117 games, he scored a total of 1,565 points, recorded 1,063 rebounds, played 4,100 minutes, and had 150 blocks. His career-highs of 40 points and 21 rebounds are both single-game records of the O'Connell Center. He also was a notably poor free throw shooter: in every season he played at Florida, his field goal percentage was higher than his free throw percentage.

=== College statistics ===
Year	Team	GP	GS	MPG	FG%	3P%	FT%	RPG	APG	SPG	BPG	PPG
1981–82	Florida	27	27	33.2	.528	–	.519	8.8	1.1	0.4	1.3	9.9
1982–83	Florida	31	31	34.3	.646	–	.600	8.5	1.1	0.9	1.5	16.5
1983–84	Florida	29	29	36.2	.615	–	.513	9.2	2.3	1.0	1.2	12.4
1984–85	Florida	30	30	36.4	.580	–	.557	9.8	3.1	0.6	1.0	14.2
Career		117	117	35.0	.597	–	.555	9.1	1.9	0.7	1.3	13.4

== Professional career ==
After his final college season McDowell was automatically eligible for the 1985 NBA draft: the Milwaukee Bucks selected him with the 21st pick of the 3rd round (68th overall). However, he never played an NBA game for the franchise, and moved to Italy where he signed for Napoli Basket (known as Mulat Napoli for sponsorship reasons). He played the 1985–86 season in the Italian top league, averaging 17.4 points and 8.5 rebounds per game. The Bucks officially released him in July 1986, and McDowell transferred to Spanish team CB Zaragoza, joining fellow American Claude Riley: coach Manel Comas chose McDowell for his defending and rebounding skills, along with his powerful physique. In his first season in the Liga ACB he averaged 15.8 points, 8.7 rebounds and 1.2 blocks in 38.8 minutes per game in regular season play. In the playoffs he played 5 games, averaging 17.8 points and 9.0 rebounds.

His good performance with Zaragoza was noticed by Aito Garcia Reneses, the coach of one of Spain's top teams, Barcelona, which signed him for the following season. McDowell played with Audie Norris, and averaged 12.2 points and 6.9 rebounds in 25 regular season games where he played 30.6 minutes per game: in the playoffs he was less used, and only recorded 6.5 points and 5.8 rebounds. At the end of the season, he won both the Spanish league title and the King's Cup with Barcelona.

He played part of the 1988–89 season with Cajabilbao, but he was cut for Mike Giomi who could provide more scoring: McDowell averaged 14.9 points and 7.2 rebounds in 25 games for Cajabilbao, recording a career-high 32 points during the season. He then moved to Turkey, where he played between 1989 and 1991 for two teams, Çukurova Sanayi and Paşabahçe. He had a trial for the Orlando Magic in 1990, but he was not selected for the season roster. Back in the USA he played two seasons in the CBA: for the Pensacola Tornados he played 33 games, and in 39 minutes per game he averaged 15.7 points, 10.9 rebounds and 1.5 blocks. The following year he played for the Birmingham Bandits, and in the regular season he appeared in 32 games, averaging 26.9 minutes, 7.8 points, 6.6 rebounds and 0.4 blocks. He also played 4 games in the CBA playoffs, averaging 3.8 points and 3.8 rebounds in 9.5 minutes. He then retired in 1992.

== Death ==
After his retirement from professional basketball, McDowell worked in a sportswear store. In the early morning hours of August 25, 1995, the police responded to a call reporting an unconscious person in the bathroom of Puzzles, a club in Casselberry, Florida. The man was McDowell, who died at Florida-Altamonte Hospital. His death was initially linked to drug abuse, but later on Shashi Gore, the medical examiner who performed the autopsy on his body, declared that there was no drug in McDowell's system, and that his death was due to hypertrophic cardiomyopathy, a condition which developed from preexistent heart problems (McDowell had been diagnosed with atrial fibrillation in 1983 and was prescribed medication for it, but stopped taking it around 1986).
