= Duke Dawson =

American gridiron football player (born 1995)

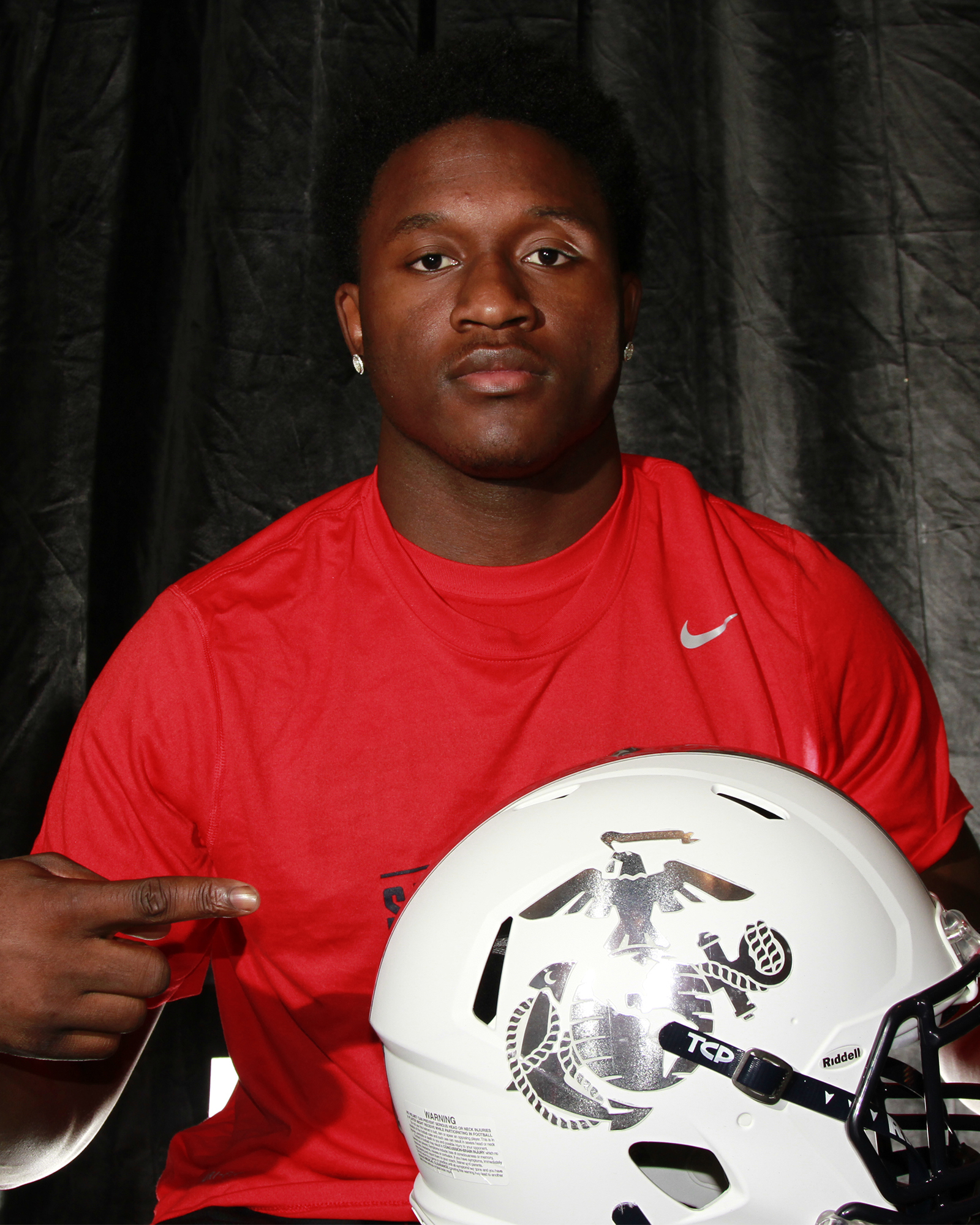
- Dawson c. 2014

Profile
- Position: Defensive back

Personal information
- Born: October 13, 1995 (age 31); Cross City, Florida, U.S.
- Listed height: 5 ft 11 in (1.80 m)
- Listed weight: 198 lb (90 kg)

Career information
- High school: Dixie County (Cross City)
- College: Florida (2014-2017)
- NFL draft: 2018: 2nd round, 56th overall pick

Career history
- New England Patriots (2018); Denver Broncos (2019–2021); Carolina Panthers (2022)*; Pittsburgh Steelers (2022–2023)*; BC Lions (2024)*
- * Offseason or practice squad member only

Awards and highlights
- Super Bowl champion (LIII); First-team All-SEC (2017)

Career NFL statistics
- Total tackles: 27
- Fumble recoveries: 1
- Pass deflections: 2
- Stats at Pro Football Reference
- Stats at CFL.ca

Duke Dawson (born October 13, 1995) is an American professional football defensive back. He played college football at Florida.

== Early life ==
Dawson is from Cross City, Florida, and went to Dixie County High School there.

== College career ==
Despite speculation that he would forgo his senior season and declare for the 2017 NFL draft, Dawson later announced that he would return to Florida for his senior year. During his senior season, he defended 13 passes, leading the Gators and tying for third in the Southeastern Conference (SEC). His accomplishments lead him to be selected for the Coaches All-SEC First-team.

== Professional career ==
Pre-draft measurables
Height	Weight	Arm length	Hand span	40-yard dash	10-yard split	20-yard split	20-yard shuttle	Three-cone drill	Bench press
5 ft 10 5/8 in (1.79 m)	197 lb (89 kg)	31 1/2 in (0.80 m)	9 in (0.23 m)	4.46 s	1.53 s	2.62 s	4.39 s	7.02 s	15 reps
All values from NFL Combine/Pro Day

=== New England Patriots ===
The New England Patriots selected Dawson in the second round with the 56th overall pick of the 2018 NFL draft. On September 6, 2018, Dawson was placed on injured reserve with a hamstring injury. On November 13, 2018, the Patriots activated Dawson off of injured reserve. Despite being taken off injured reserve Dawson was inactive for the rest of the season. He did not appear in a single game. The Patriots would go on to reach and win Super Bowl LIII where they beat the Los Angeles Rams 13–3.

=== Denver Broncos ===
On August 30, 2019, Dawson and a seventh-round pick were traded to the Denver Broncos for a sixth-round pick.

In Week 14 of the 2020 season, Dawson suffered a torn ACL, and was placed on injured reserve on December 16, 2020.

On September 1, 2021, Dawson was placed on the reserve/physically unable to perform list to start the season. He was activated on November 8, then waived and re-signed to the practice squad. His contract expired when the teams season ended on January 8, 2022.

=== Carolina Panthers ===
On July 29, 2022, Dawson signed with the Carolina Panthers. He was placed on injured reserve on August 23. He was waived on August 25, 2022.

=== Pittsburgh Steelers ===
On October 12, 2022, Dawson was signed to the Pittsburgh Steelers practice squad. He signed a reserve/future contract on January 10, 2023. However, he was waived/injured on August 14, and placed on injured reserve. He was released on August 21.

=== BC Lions ===
On February 20, 2024, it was announced that Dawson had signed with the BC Lions. He was released on May 25, 2024.
