= Dixie District Schools =

School district in Florida, United States

Address
- 16077 Southeast Highway 19 Cross City, Florida, 32628; United States

District information
- Type: Public
- Grades: PreK–12
- Superintendent: Mike Thomas
- Budget: $44.5 million (2023-2024)
- NCES District ID: 1200450

Students and staff
- Students: 2,131
- Teachers: 121.0
- Staff: 222.0
- Student–teacher ratio: 17.61

Other information
- Website: www.dixie.k12.fl.us

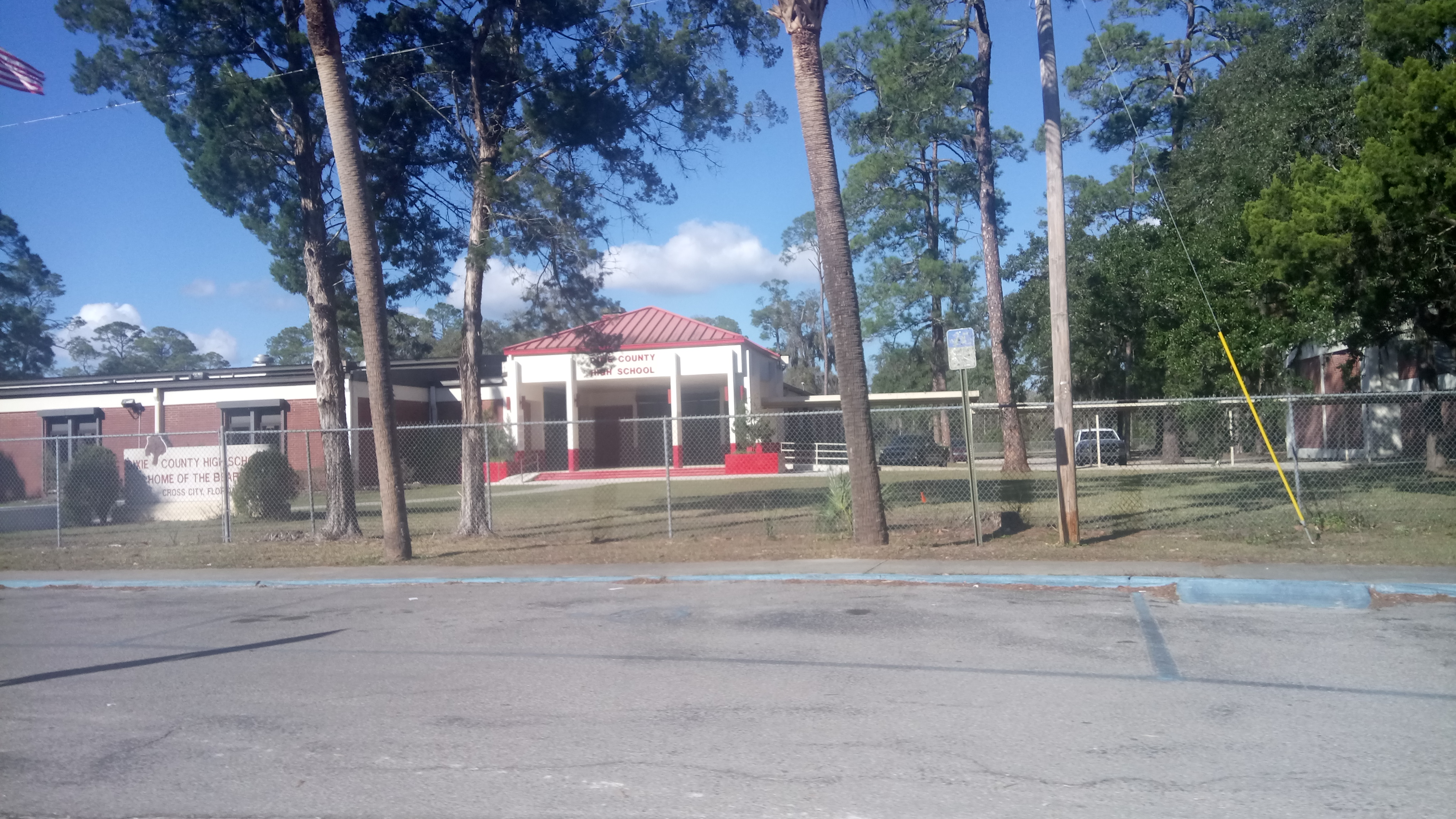
Dixie County High School

Dixie County School District, also known as Dixie District Schools, is a school district serving Dixie County, Florida. It is headquartered in Cross City.

== Schools ==
- Dixie County High School (Cross City)
- Ruth Rains Middle School (Cross City)
- Anderson Elementary School (Cross City)
- Old Town Elementary School (Old Town)
