= Greg Dreiling =

American basketball player (born 1962)

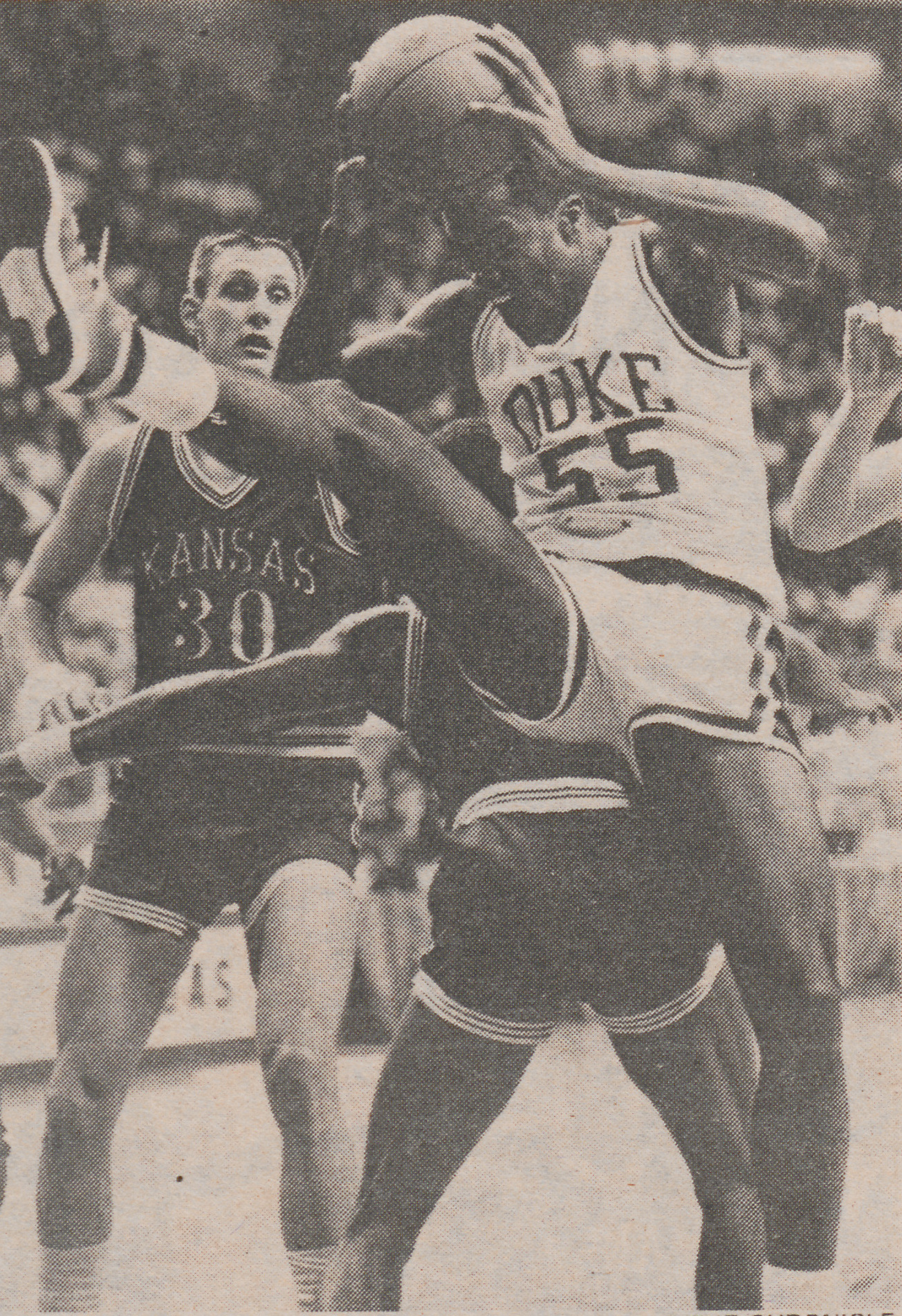
- Dreiling (left) in the 1986 Final Four

Personal information
- Born: November 7, 1962 (age 64) Wichita, Kansas, U.S.
- Listed height: 7 ft 1 in (2.16 m)
- Listed weight: 250 lb (113 kg)

Career information
- High school: Kapaun Mt. Carmel (Wichita, Kansas)
- College: Wichita State (1981–1982); Kansas (1983–1986)
- NBA draft: 1986: 2nd round, 26th overall pick
- Drafted by: Indiana Pacers
- Playing career: 1986–1998
- Position: Center
- Number: 54, 40, 30, 50

Career history
- 1986–1993: Indiana Pacers
- 1993–1994: Dallas Mavericks
- 1994–1995: Cleveland Cavaliers
- 1995: Oklahoma City Cavalry
- 1995–1996: Rockford Lightning
- 1996–1997: Dallas Mavericks
- 1997: Pau-Orthez
- 1997–1998: Rockford Lightning

Career highlights
- McDonald's All-American (1981); First-team Parade All-American (1981); Fourth-team Parade All-American (1980)

Career statistics
- Points: 1,014 (2.1 ppg)
- Rebounds: 1,018 (2.1 rpg)
- Personal fouls: 923 (1.9 pfpg)
- Stats at NBA.com
- Stats at Basketball Reference
Medals
Men's basketball
Representing United States
Summer Universiade
Silver medal – second place	1985 Kobe	National team

Gregory Alan Dreiling (born November 7, 1962) is an American former professional basketball player. Dreiling played center. He attended high school at Kapaun Mt. Carmel Catholic High School in Wichita, Kansas. He initially attended Wichita State University and later transferred to the University of Kansas after his freshman year. He was selected by the Indiana Pacers in the second round of the 1986 NBA draft. Dreiling played ten seasons in the NBA, primarily as a backup center. He also played for the Dallas Mavericks and Cleveland Cavaliers in the NBA. He also played in the Continental Basketball Association for the Oklahoma City Cavalry and Rockford Lightning.

He serves as an advance scout for the Dallas Mavericks.

== Career stats ==
=== NBA ===
==== Regular season ====
Legend
GP	Games played	GS	Games started	MPG	Minutes per game
FG%	Field goal percentage	3P%	3-point field goal percentage	FT%	Free throw percentage
RPG	Rebounds per game	APG	Assists per game	SPG	Steals per game
BPG	Blocks per game	PPG	Points per game	**Bold**	Career high

Year	Team	GP	GS	MPG	FG%	3P%	FT%	RPG	APG	SPG	BPG	PPG
1986–87	Indiana	24	0	5.3	.432	–	**.833**	1.8	.3	.1	.1	1.8
1987–88	Indiana	20	0	3.7	.471	–	.692	.9	.3	.1	.2	1.7
1988–89	Indiana	53	4	7.5	**.558**	–	.672	1.7	.3	.1	.2	2.4
1989–90	Indiana	49	0	6.3	.377	–	.735	1.8	.2	.1	.3	1.3
1990–91	Indiana	**73**	**42**	**14.1**	.505	.000	.600	**3.5**	**.7**	**.3**	**.4**	**3.5**
1991–92	Indiana	60	23	8.5	.494	**1.000**	.750	1.6	.4	.2	.3	2.0
1992–93	Indiana	43	0	5.6	.328	.000	.533	1.5	.2	.1	.2	1.1
1993–94	Dallas	54	19	12.7	.500	**1.000**	.711	3.1	.6	**.3**	**.4**	2.4
1994–95	Cleveland	58	3	8.3	.412	–	.634	2.0	.4	.1	**.4**	1.9
1996–97	Dallas	40	3	9.7	.459	**1.000**	.407	1.9	.3	.2	.2	2.0
Career		474	94	8.9	.467	.333	.649	2.1	.4	.2	.3	2.1

==== Playoffs ====
Year	Team	GP	GS	MPG	FG%	3P%	FT%	RPG	APG	SPG	BPG	PPG
1991	Indiana	**5**	**5**	**15.0**	.333	–	**.667**	**3.6**	.0	.0	.0	**2.8**
1992	Indiana	1	0	3.0	–	–	–	.0	.0	.0	.0	.0
1993	Indiana	2	0	2.0	**1.000**	**1.000**	–	.5	.0	.0	.0	1.5
1995	Cleveland	1	0	7.0	.000	–	–	1.0	.0	.0	.0	.0
Career		9	5	9.9	.333	1.000	.667	2.2	.0	.0	.0	1.9

=== College ===
Year	Team	GP	GS	MPG	FG%	3P%	FT%	RPG	APG	SPG	BPG	PPG
1981–82	Wichita State	29	10	18.4	.543		**.753**	4.2	.6	.3	1.2	8.1
1983–84	Kansas	32	30	23.2	.531		.742	4.8	.9	**.4**	1.2	9.7
1984–85	Kansas	34	34	**29.0**	.577		.727	**6.9**	1.2	**.4**	**1.6**	**13.1**
1985–86	Kansas	**39**	**39**	26.4	**.600**		.711	6.7	**1.5**	.3	1.2	11.6
Career		134	113	24.6	.568		.731	5.8	1.1	.4	1.3	10.8
