= Cross City, Florida =

- Town
- Town of Cross City
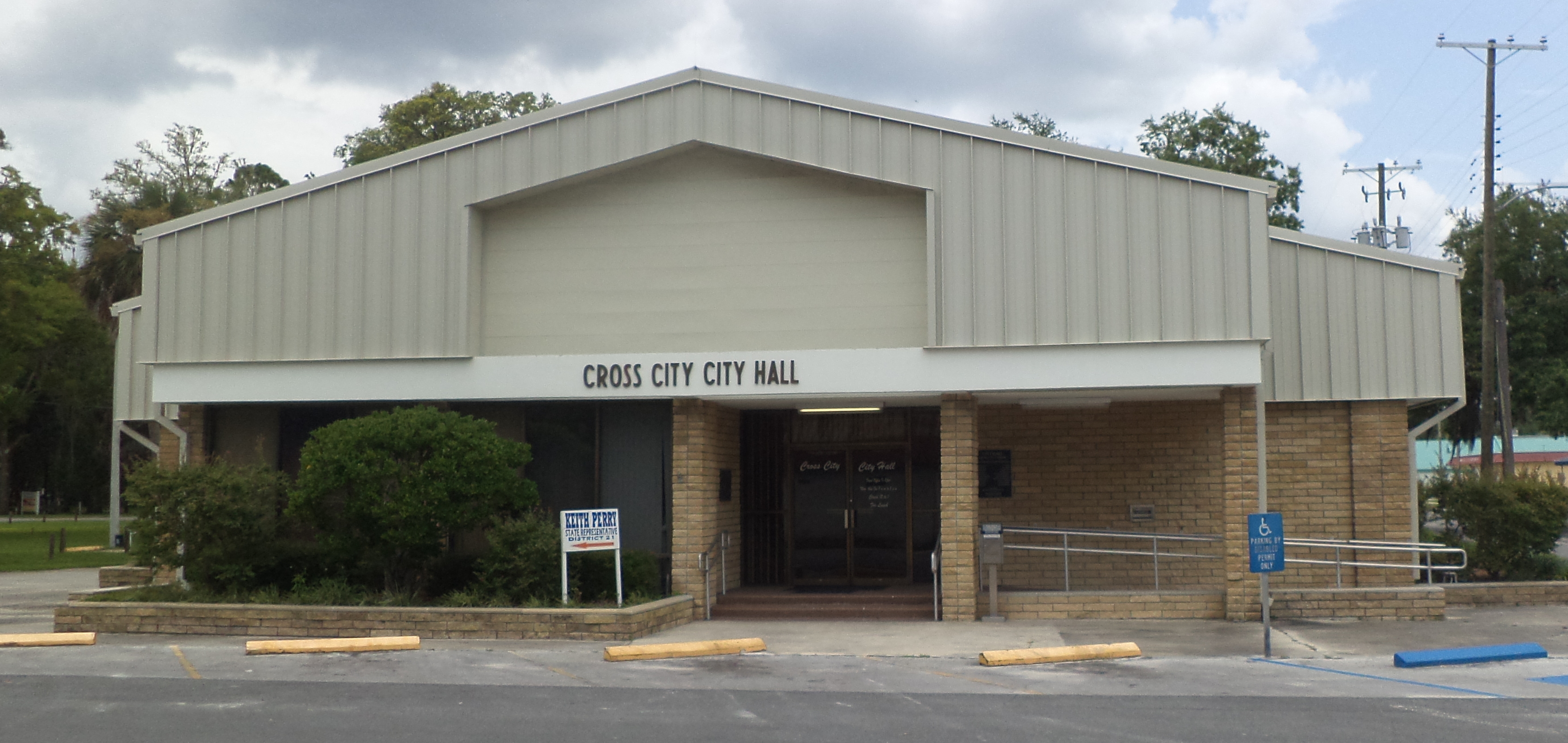
- Cross City Town Hall

- Seal
- Motto(s): "Biggest Little Town in Dixie" "In God We Trust"
- Location in Dixie County and the state of Florida
- Coordinates: 29°37′52″N 83°07′40″W
- Country: United States
- State: Florida
- County: Dixie
- Settled (Crossroads): c. Late 1890s
- Settled (Cross City): 1912
- Incorporated (Town of Cross City): April 1924

Government
  - Type: Council-Manager
  - Mayor: Ryan Fulford
  - Vice Mayor: Kirk Marhefka
  - Councilmembers: Kenneth "Tank" Lee, Angela Carter, and Charlie Heidelburg Jr.
  - Town Manager: John Driggers
  - Town Clerk: Sheila Watson

Area
  - Total: 1.85 sq mi (4.78 km^{2})
  - Land: 1.85 sq mi (4.78 km^{2})
  - Water: 0 sq mi (0.00 km^{2})
- Elevation: 43 ft (13 m)

Population (2020)
  - Total: 1,689
  - Density: 914.9/sq mi (353.23/km^{2})
- Time zone: UTC-5 (Eastern (EST))
  - Summer (DST): UTC-4 (EDT)
- ZIP code: 32628
- Area code: 352
- FIPS code: 12-15575
- GNIS feature ID: 2406338
- Website: www.townofcrosscity.com

Cross City is a town and the county seat of Dixie County, Florida, United States. The population was 1,689 at the 2020 census.

== Geography ==
According to the United States Census Bureau, the town has a total area of 1.9 square miles (4.9 km^{2}), all land.

=== Climate ===
The climate in this area is characterized by hot, humid summers and generally mild winters. According to the Köppen climate classification, the Town of Cross City has a humid subtropical climate zone (Cfa).

Climate data for Cross City 1 E, Florida, 1991–2020 normals, extremes 1948–present
| Month | Jan | Feb | Mar | Apr | May | Jun | Jul | Aug | Sep | Oct | Nov | Dec | Year |
|---|---|---|---|---|---|---|---|---|---|---|---|---|---|
| Record high °F (°C) | 88 (31) | 87 (31) | 96 (36) | 95 (35) | 101 (38) | 103 (39) | 101 (38) | 100 (38) | 100 (38) | 96 (36) | 91 (33) | 85 (29) | 103 (39) |
| Mean maximum °F (°C) | 79.6 (26.4) | 80.8 (27.1) | 84.1 (28.9) | 87.5 (30.8) | 92.5 (33.6) | 95.7 (35.4) | 96.2 (35.7) | 95.5 (35.3) | 93.1 (33.9) | 89.3 (31.8) | 84.5 (29.2) | 80.6 (27.0) | 97.4 (36.3) |
| Mean daily maximum °F (°C) | 65.9 (18.8) | 69.6 (20.9) | 75.2 (24.0) | 80.2 (26.8) | 86.7 (30.4) | 89.6 (32.0) | 90.7 (32.6) | 90.6 (32.6) | 88.3 (31.3) | 82.4 (28.0) | 73.9 (23.3) | 68.5 (20.3) | 80.1 (26.7) |
| Daily mean °F (°C) | 52.7 (11.5) | 56.3 (13.5) | 61.4 (16.3) | 66.8 (19.3) | 74.0 (23.3) | 79.2 (26.2) | 81.1 (27.3) | 81.2 (27.3) | 78.5 (25.8) | 70.6 (21.4) | 61.1 (16.2) | 55.7 (13.2) | 68.2 (20.1) |
| Mean daily minimum °F (°C) | 39.5 (4.2) | 43.0 (6.1) | 47.6 (8.7) | 53.4 (11.9) | 61.3 (16.3) | 68.8 (20.4) | 71.5 (21.9) | 71.8 (22.1) | 68.7 (20.4) | 58.7 (14.8) | 48.3 (9.1) | 42.8 (6.0) | 56.3 (13.5) |
| Mean minimum °F (°C) | 23.3 (−4.8) | 26.3 (−3.2) | 31.2 (−0.4) | 39.4 (4.1) | 47.9 (8.8) | 61.1 (16.2) | 67.1 (19.5) | 67.4 (19.7) | 59.6 (15.3) | 43.1 (6.2) | 30.8 (−0.7) | 27.1 (−2.7) | 21.6 (−5.8) |
| Record low °F (°C) | 10 (−12) | 16 (−9) | 20 (−7) | 30 (−1) | 35 (2) | 40 (4) | 57 (14) | 57 (14) | 40 (4) | 30 (−1) | 15 (−9) | 12 (−11) | 10 (−12) |
| Average precipitation inches (mm) | 4.01 (102) | 3.39 (86) | 4.47 (114) | 3.25 (83) | 3.03 (77) | 7.15 (182) | 8.37 (213) | 9.41 (239) | 6.24 (158) | 2.70 (69) | 1.81 (46) | 4.04 (103) | 57.87 (1,470) |
| Average precipitation days (≥ 0.01 in) | 10.3 | 9.3 | 8.2 | 7.0 | 7.7 | 14.7 | 18.2 | 18.3 | 13.0 | 7.7 | 6.2 | 8.9 | 129.5 |
Source: NOAA

== Demographics ==
Historical population
| Census | Pop. | Note | %± |
|---|---|---|---|
| 1930 | 1,071 | | — |
| 1940 | 1,869 | | 74.5% |
| 1950 | 1,522 | | −18.6% |
| 1960 | 1,857 | | 22.0% |
| 1970 | 2,268 | | 22.1% |
| 1980 | 2,154 | | −5.0% |
| 1990 | 2,041 | | −5.2% |
| 2000 | 1,775 | | −13.0% |
| 2010 | 1,728 | | −2.6% |
| 2020 | 1,689 | | −2.3% |
U.S. Decennial Census

=== Racial and ethnic composition ===
Cross City racial composition (Hispanics excluded from racial categories) (NH = Non-Hispanic)
| Race | Pop 2010 | Pop 2020 | % 2010 | % 2020 |
|---|---|---|---|---|
| White (NH) | 1,186 | 1,112 | 68.63% | 65.84% |
| Black or African American (NH) | 469 | 407 | 27.14% | 24.10% |
| Native American or Alaska Native (NH) | 4 | 17 | 0.23% | 1.01% |
| Asian (NH) | 7 | 14 | 0.41% | 0.83% |
| Pacific Islander or Native Hawaiian (NH) | 0 | 0 | 0.00% | 0.00% |
| Some other race (NH) | 0 | 2 | 0.00% | 0.12% |
| Two or more races/Multiracial (NH) | 29 | 89 | 1.68% | 5.27% |
| Hispanic or Latino (any race) | 33 | 48 | 1.91% | 2.84% |
| Total | 1,728 | 1,689 | | |

=== 2020 census ===
As of the 2020 census, Cross City had a population of 1,689. The median age was 41.8 years. 23.9% of residents were under the age of 18 and 21.5% were 65 years of age or older. For every 100 females there were 90.0 males, and for every 100 females age 18 and over there were 82.0 males age 18 and over.

There were 652 households in Cross City, of which 33.4% had children under the age of 18 living in them. Of all households, 37.7% were married-couple households, 19.8% were households with a male householder and no spouse or partner present, and 35.9% were households with a female householder and no spouse or partner present. About 27.3% of all households were made up of individuals and 12.7% had someone living alone who was 65 years of age or older.

There were 818 housing units, of which 20.3% were vacant. The homeowner vacancy rate was 3.8% and the rental vacancy rate was 16.2%.

0.0% of residents lived in urban areas, while 100.0% lived in rural areas.

As of 2020, the American Community Survey 5-year estimate reported 701 families residing in the town.

=== 2010 census ===
As of the 2010 United States census, there were 1,728 people, 448 households, and 287 families residing in the town.

=== 2000 census ===
As of the census of 2000, there were 1,775 people, 686 households, and 478 families residing in the town. The population density was 935.6 inhabitants per square mile (361.2/km^{2}). There were 799 housing units at an average density of 421.1 per square mile (162.6/km^{2}). The racial makeup of the town was 70.48% White, 27.27% African American, 0.17% Native American, 0.56% Asian, 0.11% Pacific Islander, and 1.41% from two or more races. Hispanic or Latino of any race were 0.51% of the population.

In 2000, there were 686 households, out of which 34.5% had children under the age of 18 living with them, 44.2% were married couples living together, 21.9% had a female householder with no husband present, and 30.3% were non-families. 27.0% of all households were made up of individuals, and 15.7% had someone living alone who was 65 years of age or older. The average household size was 2.51 and the average family size was 3.04.

In 2000, in the town, the population was spread out, with 30.3% under the age of 18, 8.2% from 18 to 24, 23.7% from 25 to 44, 20.1% from 45 to 64, and 17.7% who were 65 years of age or older. The median age was 35 years. For every 100 females, there were 84.5 males. For every 100 females age 18 and over, there were 78.2 males.

In 2000, the median income for a household in the town was $20,081, and the median income for a family was $28,884. Males had a median income of $26,419 versus $18,684 for females. The per capita income for the town was $12,125. About 20.3% of families and 27.2% of the population were below the poverty line, including 33.9% of those under age 18 and 29.1% of those age 65 or over.

== Transportation ==
Cross City Airport is a public-use airport, located 1 mile (1.6 km) east of the central business district.

== Education ==
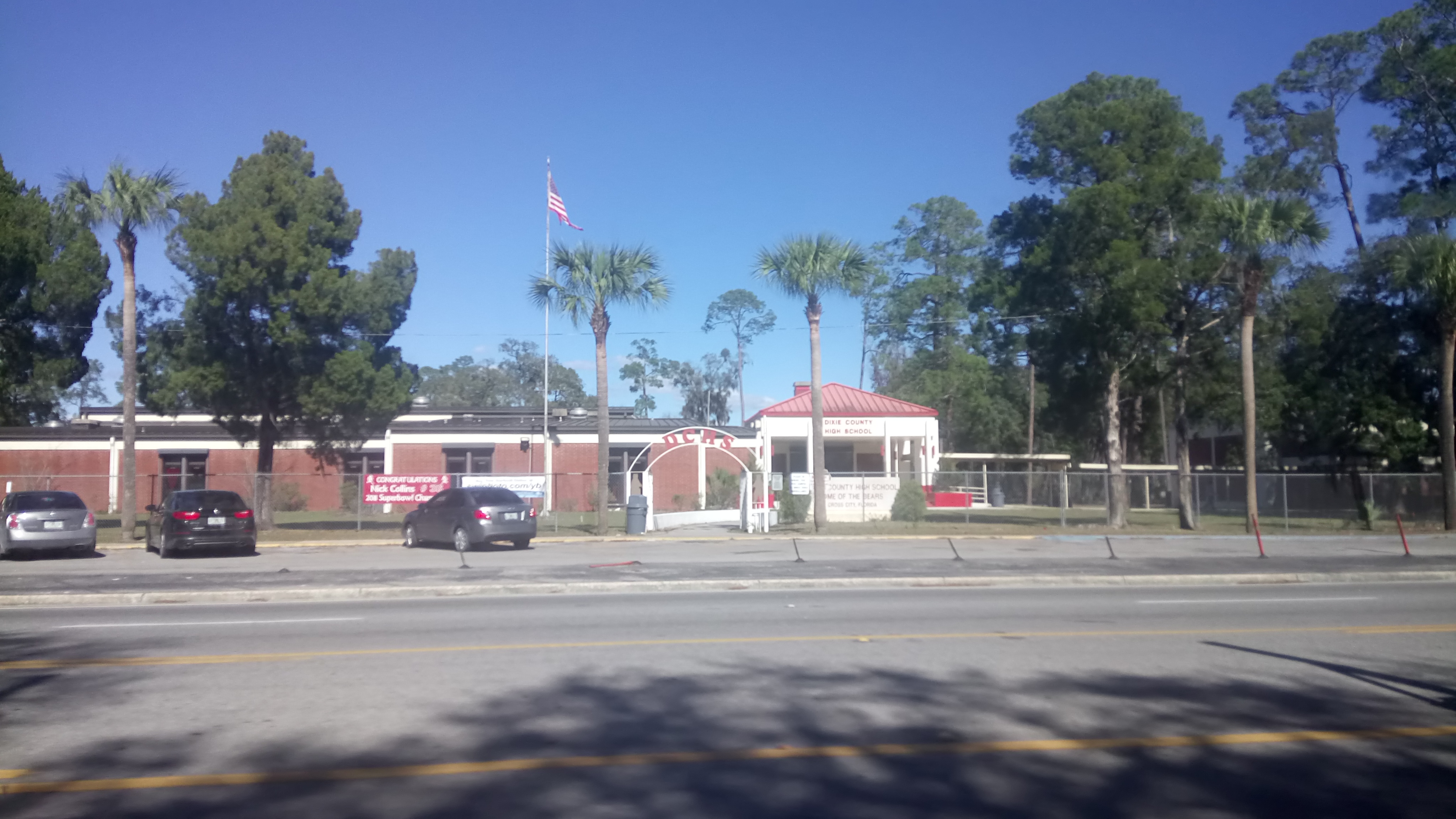
Dixie County High School

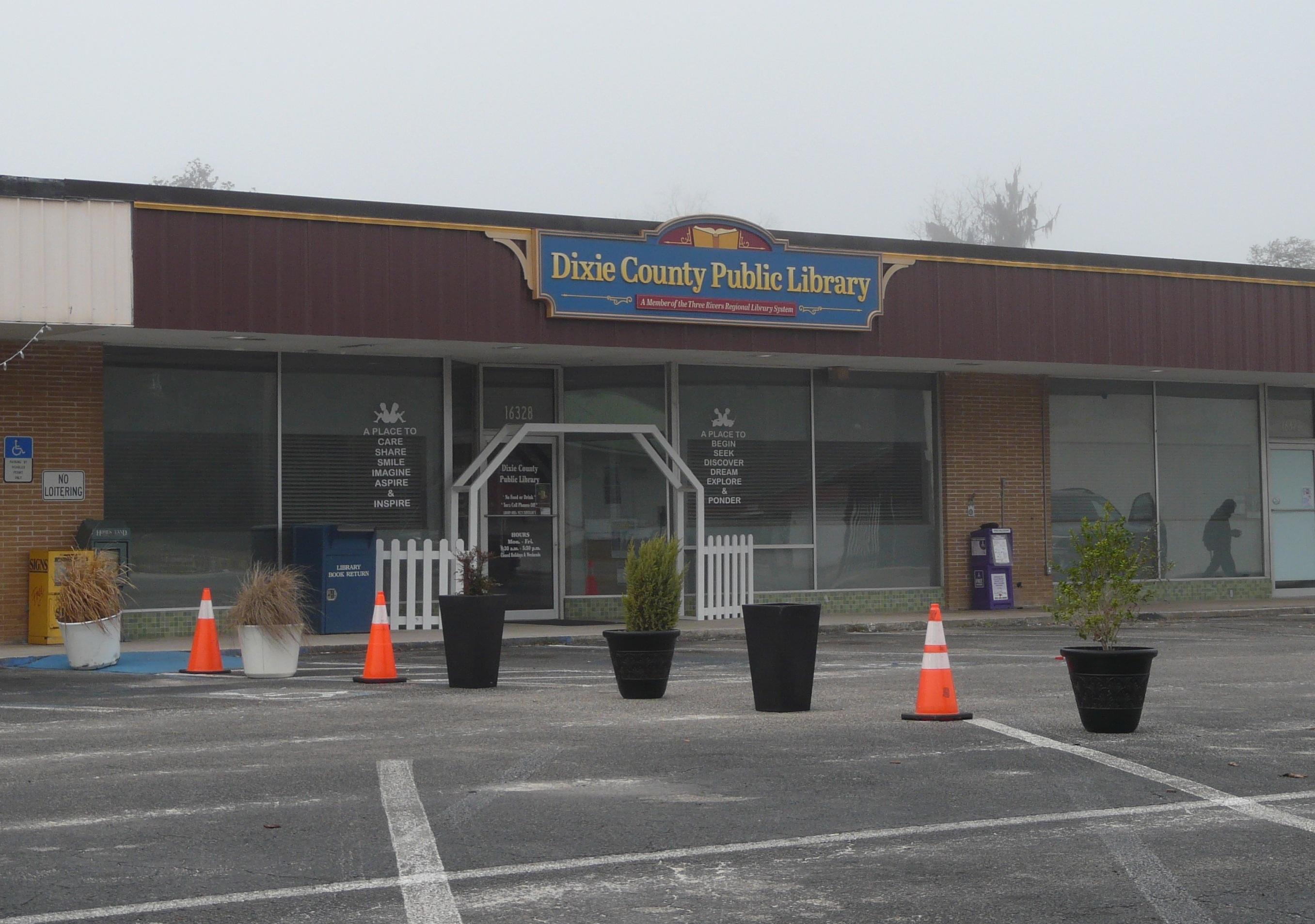
Dixie County Library in Cross City

Residents are served by Dixie District Schools. The public schools serving Cross City are:

- Dixie County High School
- Ruth Rains Middle School
- James Anderson Elementary School

=== Library ===
Dixie County Public Library is in Cross City. It is a part of the Three Rivers Regional Library System.

== Notable people ==
- Nick Collins, defensive back NFL football player for the Green Bay Packers
- Duke Dawson, defensive back NFL football player for the Denver Broncos
- Eugene McDowell, professional NBA basketball player
