= Adrian Branch =

American basketball player (born 1963)

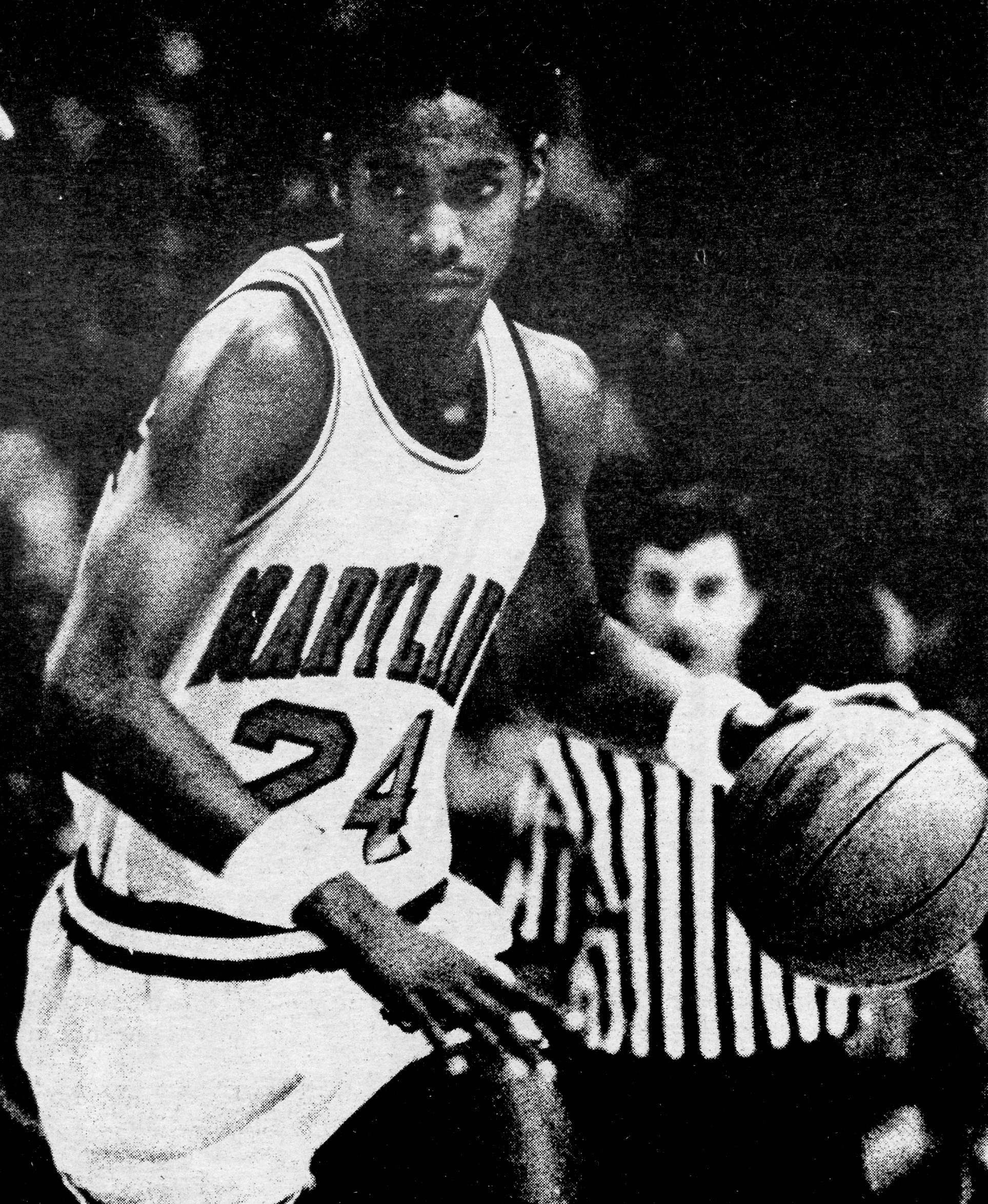
- Branch playing for Maryland in 1983

Personal information
- Born: November 17, 1963 (age 62) Washington, D.C., U.S.
- Listed height: 6 ft 7 in (2.01 m)
- Listed weight: 185 lb (84 kg)

Career information
- High school: DeMatha Catholic (Hyattsville, Maryland)
- College: Maryland (1981–1985)
- NBA draft: 1985: 2nd round, 46th overall pick
- Drafted by: Chicago Bulls
- Playing career: 1985–1995
- Position: Small forward
- Number: 24, 21, 1

Career history
- 1985–1986: Baltimore Lightning
- 1986–1987: Los Angeles Lakers
- 1987: New Jersey Nets
- 1987–1988: Unicaja Málaga
- 1988–1989: Portland Trail Blazers
- 1989: Minnesota Timberwolves
- 1989–1990: Sioux Falls Skyforce
- 1990–1991: Monaco
- 1991–1992: Brisbane Bullets
- 1992–1993: Geelong Supercats
- 1994–1995: Hapoel Givatayim

Career highlights
- NBA champion (1987); 2× Second-team All-ACC (1983, 1985); Fourth-team Parade All-American (1981); McDonald's All-American Game Co-MVP (1981)
- Stats at NBA.com
- Stats at Basketball Reference

Adrian Francis Branch (born November 17, 1963) is an American former professional basketball player who played four seasons in the National Basketball Association (NBA), winning an NBA championship in 1987 with the Los Angeles Lakers. He played college basketball for the Maryland Terrapins.

A 6'7" small forward out of DeMatha High School, Branch starred at the Maryland from 1981 to 1985. He was an All-ACC second team selection twice. In 1984, Branch teamed with Len Bias and Ben Coleman to lead the Terrapins to the ACC Championship. He finished his career at Maryland as their second all-time leading scorer. In 2004, Branch was honored at the ACC Tournament as an "ACC Legend."

Branch was drafted into the NBA in the second round by the Chicago Bulls in 1985. He played a reserve role with the Los Angeles Lakers when they won the NBA Championship in 1987. He later played in Australia for the NBL's Geelong Supercats and Brisbane Bullets, as well as in Spain, France, Monaco, Thailand, the Philippines, Israel, Turkey and the Dominican Republic.

Branch has worked with Sportsworld Ministries, the Fellowship of Christian Athletes (FCA) Young Life, Youth for Christ, Youth With A Mission (YWAM), Athletes in Action (AIA), and Sports Power International.

In 2004, Branch became a television color analyst for the NBA's Charlotte Bobcats games. He joined ESPN in 2007 as a college basketball analyst.

== Career statistics ==
Legend
| GP | Games played | GS | Games started | MPG | Minutes per game |
| FG% | Field goal percentage | 3P% | 3-point field goal percentage | FT% | Free throw percentage |
| RPG | Rebounds per game | APG | Assists per game | SPG | Steals per game |
| BPG | Blocks per game | PPG | Points per game | **Bold** | Career high |
| † | Won an NBA championship |

=== NBA ===
==== Regular season ====
| Year | Team | GP | GS | MPG | FG% | 3P% | FT% | RPG | APG | SPG | BPG | PPG |
|---|---|---|---|---|---|---|---|---|---|---|---|---|
| 1986–87† | L.A. Lakers | 32 | 0 | 6.8 | **.500** | .000 | .778 | 1.7 | .5 | .5 | .1 | 4.3 |
| 1987–88 | New Jersey | 20 | 3 | **15.4** | .418 | .200 | **.870** | **2.4** | .8 | **.8** | **.6** | 6.7 |
| 1988–89 | Portland | **67** | **4** | 12.1 | .463 | .226 | .725 | 2.0 | **.9** | .7 | .0 | **7.4** |
| 1989–90 | Minnesota | 11 | 0 | 8.3 | .410 | **1.000** | .636 | 1.8 | .4 | .5 | .0 | 5.9 |
| Career | | 130 | 7 | 11.0 | .455 | .231 | .744 | 1.9 | .7 | .6 | .1 | 6.4 |

==== Playoffs ====
| Year | Team | GP | GS | MPG | FG% | 3P% | FT% | RPG | APG | SPG | BPG | PPG |
|---|---|---|---|---|---|---|---|---|---|---|---|---|
| 1987† | L.A. Lakers | **11** | 0 | 3.8 | **.190** | .000 | .500 | .9 | .5 | **.2** | .0 | 1.3 |
| 1989 | Portland | 1 | 0 | **5.0** | .000 | – | **1.000** | **1.0** | **2.0** | .0 | .0 | **2.0** |
| Career | | 12 | 0 | 3.9 | .167 | .000 | .571 | .9 | .6 | .2 | .0 | 1.3 |
