= Mary Ann Coady Weinand =

American psychiatrist

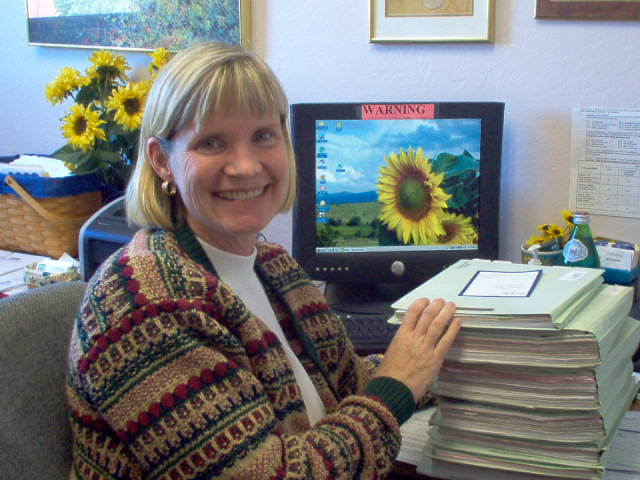
- Born: Mary Ann Coady; December 25, 1959; Homestead Air Force Base, Florida, U.S.
- Died: September 26, 2007 (aged 47); Tucson, Arizona, U.S.
- Education: University of Kansas; University of Kansas School of Medicine
- Spouse: Martin Edward Weinand (m. 1986)
- Children: 3

Mary Ann Weinand (née Coady; December 25, 1959 – September 26, 2007) was an American psychiatrist who worked at a COPE Community Services, Inc., clinic in Tucson, Arizona.

In May 2008, eight months after her death, COPE renamed the clinic at 8050 East Lakeside Parkway, where she worked, in her honor – the Mary Ann Coady Weinand, M.D. Clinic. However, by August 2014, the honorific name was dropped from the COPE website, and it is now called the Lakeside Integrated Care Clinic.

== Early life and career ==
Mary Ann Coady was born on Christmas Day, 1959, at Homestead Air Force Base, Florida. She was raised in Wichita, Kansas.

In 1986, she graduated from the University of Kansas School of Medicine, where she had met her husband, neurosurgeon Martin E. Weinand. Shortly after her graduation in May 1986, the couple married in Wichita and had three children together.

The couple settled in Tucson, Arizona, in 1991, where she practiced psychiatry on a half schedule of 15 hours per week, allowing her to engage in charitable work within the community while raising her family. She worked until summer 2001, just a few months before her death.

== Death ==
Coady Weinand died at home on September 26, 2007, aged 47, from breast cancer. She wrote her own obituary, published in the Arizona Daily Star.

== Mary Ann Coady Weinand, M.D. Clinic (2008–2013) ==
In May 2008, COPE briefly renamed its clinic at 8050 East Lakeside Parkway, where she worked, in her honor – the Mary Ann Coady Weinand, M.D. Clinic.

By 2014, COPE had dropped the Mary Ann Coady Weinand, M.D. The clinic's name on its website shows that the clinic at 8050 East Lakeside Parkway operated under the name Lakeside Clinic. As of July 2023, the former Coady Weinand, M.D. Clinic is shown on the COPE website as the Lakeside Integrated Care Clinic.
