= Kapaun Mt. Carmel Catholic High School =

Kapaun Mt. Carmel High School

Location
- 8506 East Central Avenue; Wichita, Kansas 67206; United States; 37°41′42″N 97°14′18″W

Information
- School type: Private, High School, Coed, Parochial school
- Religious affiliation: Roman Catholic
- Established: 1971
- President: Robert Knapp
- Principal: Chris Bloomer
- Teaching staff: 64.3 (on an FTE basis)
- Grades: 9 to 12
- Enrollment: 878 (2019–20)
- Student to teacher ratio: 13.7
- Colors: Blue; White
- Athletics: Class 5A
- Athletics conference: Greater Wichita Athletic League (GWAL)
- Nickname: Crusaders
- Accreditation: North Central Association of Colleges and Schools
- Newspaper: Paladin
- Yearbook: Crusader
- Tuition: None (Stewardship Model)
- Website: Kapaun.org
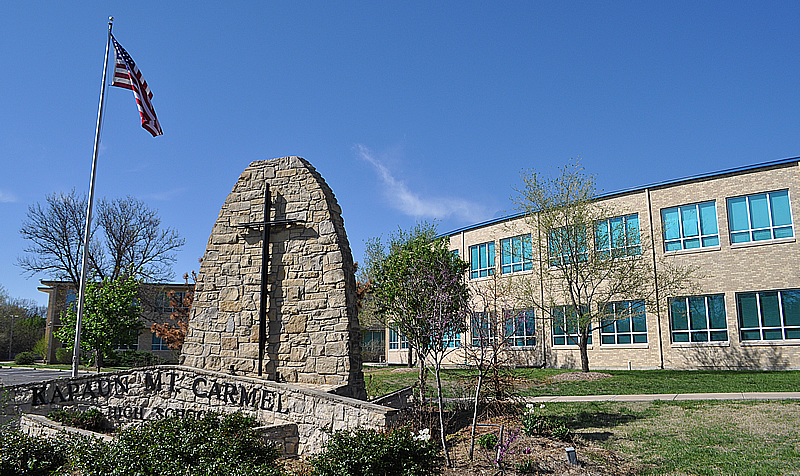

Kapaun Mt. Carmel Catholic High School, sometimes called Kapaun, is a private, four year, co-educational, secondary school operated by the Roman Catholic Diocese of Wichita. It is located on the east side of Wichita, Kansas. The school colors are blue and white. The average annual enrollment is approximately 850 students.

Kapaun Mt. Carmel is a member of the Kansas State High School Activities Association and offers a variety of sports programs. Athletic teams compete in the 5A division and are known as the "Crusaders". Extracurricular activities are also offered in the form of performing arts, school publications, and clubs.

== History ==
Chaplain Kapaun Memorial High School was named after Chaplain Emil Kapaun, a priest of the Wichita Diocese who served and died in the Korean War. It opened in 1956 another site on east Central Ave (not the same as the present site), in east Wichita, and was operated by the Jesuits as a preparatory school for young men. Jesuits served at the school in various capacities until the early 1990s. Alumni of the initial Chaplain Kapaun school recall that under the basketball court's "floating floor" was a rifle range, where students - under supervision - practiced marksmanship with school-supplied .22 cal rifles, and that supported a school rifle team.

Mount Carmel Academy was established in 1887 by the Sisters of Charity of the Blessed Virgin Mary (BVM) as a girl's boarding school at the northwest corner of Douglas & St Paul in Wichita. The BVM sisters served the school until the early 1990s. John (Jack) Vickers (1891-1940) was an oil mogul who got his start in Butler County oil fields and former "Vickers Oil Refinery" in Potwin. In 1934, Vickers built a large mansion at 8500 E Central (named "Vickridge"). In 1961, his estate became the new site for "Mount Carmel Academy".

Kapaun Mt. Carmel High School was established in 1971 as the result of the merger of "Chaplain Kapaun Memorial High School" and "Mount Carmel Academy" at the current Vickridge location.

In 2006, Kapaun Mt. Carmel began a $2.3 million expansion to the school. A new restroom was constructed, as well as expanded art and debate rooms, new teacher lounges, and a new student commons area. The expansion was completed in August 2007.

== Academics ==
Kapaun Mt. Carmel Catholic High School is also accredited by the State of Kansas, and the National Catholic Educational Association. Institutional membership is held in the National Association of College Admissions Counseling and several other professional organizations.

== Extracurricular activities ==
=== Athletics ===
The Crusaders compete in the Greater Wichita Athletic League (GWAL) and are classified as a 5A school, the second-largest classification in Kansas according to the Kansas State High School Activities Association. Throughout its history, Kapaun Mt. Carmel has won 102 state championships in various sports.

==== Football ====
From 1969 to 1990, Eddie Kriwiel coached football and served as the athletic director at Kapaun Mt. Carmel High School. Kriwiel won 297 games as a high school football coach and his teams had just two losing seasons in 36 years. His teams played in 12 state championship games and won 9.

==== Golf ====
Coach Kriwiel was also successful as a high school golf coach. From 1969 to 1990, his teams won 20 state titles and 28 top-four finishes. While unofficial, this is believed by many to be a national record. Coach Corey Novascone brought success back to the Kapaun Mt Carmel Golf team. Compiling 7 state titles in a row as a head coach for both boys and girls golf. The girls' golf team had a 30-year stretch between state titles. Coach Marie Thomas, Coach Corey Novascone, and Coach Eric Johnsen were on the coaching staff for 9 state championships in the 11 year stretch from 2013 to 2024. As of 2024, the boys golf team holds the national record for most state championships as a high school team at 34.

==== Other sports ====
Kapaun Mt. Carmel currently has the most Kansas state championships in football, wrestling, and golf as well as holding two grand state wrestling championships. The grand state wrestling championship tournament was only held twice, with Kapaun winning both.

==== Sports programs ====
Fall

- Football
- Volleyball
- Boys' Cross-Country
- Girls' Cross-Country
- Girls' Golf
- Boys' Soccer
- Girls' Tennis
- Cheerleading
- Girls' Gymnastics

Winter

- Boys' Basketball
- Girls' Basketball
- Wrestling
- Boys' Bowling
- Girls' Bowling
- Winter Cheerleading
- Boys' Swimming & Diving

Spring

- Baseball
- Boys' Golf
- Boys' Tennis
- Girls' Soccer
- Girls' Swimming & Diving
- Softball
- Boys' Track and Field
- Girls' Track and Field

==== State championships ====
State Championships
Season	Sport	Number of Championships	Year
Fall	Cross Country, Boys	4	1977, 1979, 1980, 1981
Fall	Cross Country, Girls	1	2003
Fall	Football	10	1970, 1972, 1974, 1975, 1976, 1977, 1981, 1982, 1987, 2025
Fall	Soccer, Boys	1	1997
Fall	Golf, Girls	13	1975, 1983, 2013, 2014, 2015, 2016, 2020, 2021, 2022, 2023, 2024, 2025, 2026
Fall	Tennis, Girls	13	1984, 1985, 1986, 1989, 1990, 1993, 1994, 1995, 2000, 2001, 2005, 2006, 2007, 2011, 2019
Fall	Gymnastics, Girls	4	1979, 1980, 1981, 1982
Winter	Wrestling	12	1975, 1975 Grand State, 1976, 1976 Grand State, 1977, 1978, 1981, 1983, 1984, 1985, 1986, 1987
Winter	Basketball, Boys	5	1978, 1980, 1981, 2012, 2024, 2025
Winter	Basketball, Girls	2	1979, 2012
Winter	Indoor Track & Field, Boys	2	1977, 1978
Spring	Baseball	1	1963
Spring	Track and Field, Girls	1	2005
Spring	Track and Field, Boys	8	1977 indoor, 1977 outdoor, 1978 indoor, 1978 outdoor, 1979, 1982, 1983, 2025
Spring	Tennis, Boys	1	1999
Spring	Golf, Boys	34	1958 (2-Man), 1964 (2-Man), 1971, 1972 (2-Man), 1973, 1975 (2-Man), 1976, 1977, 1979, 1980, 1981, 1982, 1983, 1984, 1985, 1987, 1989, 1990, 1992, 1993, 1994, 1997, 1998, 1999, 2003, 2004, 2010, 2012, 2013, 2014, 2015, 2021, 2022, 2024
Total		112	

=== Non-athletic activities ===
==== Science Olympiad ====
Kapaun Mt. Carmel won the Kansas State Science Olympiad competition from 2003 to 2007.

==== Scholars Bowl ====
The Crusaders won the Scholars Bowl State Tournament in 1996, 2001, 2002, 2013, 2017, and 2024.

==== Eco Meet ====
Kapaun Mt. Carmel won the State Eco-Meet competition in 2005 and 2006.

== Notable alumni ==
- David Arkin, former player for the Dallas Cowboys
- Dan and Frank Carney, founders of Pizza Hut
- Greg Dreiling, former NBA player
- Tysyn Hartman, former NFL player
- Grier Jones, former PGA Tour golfer, 1968 NCAA champion and former golf coach at Wichita State University
- Ben Powers, offensive lineman Denver Broncos
- Matt Schlapp, political lobbyist, political analyst on television
- Mary Ann Coady Weinand, psychiatrist
- Samuel Stevens - PGA Tour Golfer

== Notable faculty ==
- Eddie Kriwiel, football and golf coach, member of 7 Kansas Halls of Fame

== See also ==
- Education in Kansas
- List of high schools in Kansas
