= Dixie County High School =

High school in Florida, United States

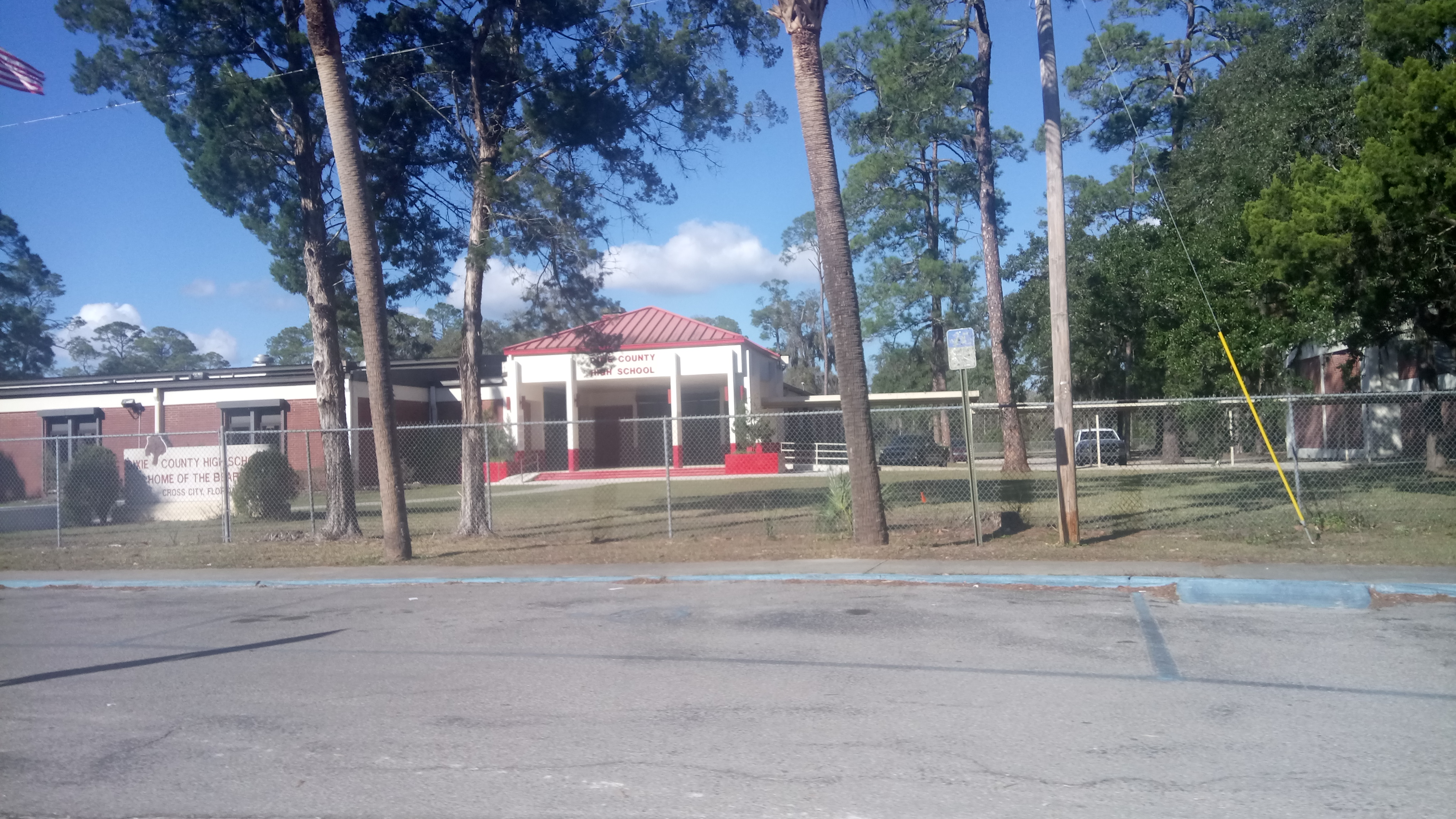

Location
- 17924 SE Highway 19; Cross City, Dixie County, Florida; United States; 29.6198°N 83.10771°W

Information
- School type: Public
- School district: Dixie District Schools
- NCES School ID: 120045000626
- Principal: Eli Long
- Teaching staff: 37.00 (FTE)
- Grades: 8-12
- Enrollment: 669 (2023-2024)
- Student to teacher ratio: 18.08
- Colors: Red, Black, & White
- Mascot: Bears
- Website: https://www.dixie.k12.fl.us/dixiecountyhigh

Dixie County Middle High School is part of Dixie District Schools serving Dixie County in Cross City, Florida, United States. It is at is at 17924 SE 19 HWY. The school changed its name in 2021 from Dixie County High School, due to the school now including grades 8–12. Students grades 6–7 in Dixie County are still taught at Ruth Raines Middle School.

According to the school, the vision of Dixie County High School is to create a nurturing culture that strives to instill the desire in all students to become lifelong learners through a rigorous and relevant curriculum that prepares them for college, career, and success in a global society.

== Academics ==
Career technical programs—Health Sciences (Certified Nursing Assistant), Welding, Agriculture, Aeronautical, Biotech, Computer Science, and Digital Technology—offer students industry certification to prepare them for work after high school graduation.

== Athletics ==
The school's teams are known as the Bears and Lady Bears. Sports include: football, softball, basketball, baseball, weight lifting, and soccer. The school colors are red, black, and white.

== Alumni ==
- Eugene McDowell (1981), professional basketball player
- Nick Collins (2001), National Football League Player for the Green Bay Packers
- Duke Dawson (2014), National Football League defensive back
