= List of county roads in Columbia County, Florida =

- County road shields used in Florida

Highway names
- Interstates: Interstate X (I-X)
- US Highways: U.S. Highway X (US X)
- State: State Road X (SR X)
- County: County Road X (CR-X)

System links
- County roads in Florida; County roads in Columbia County

The following is a list of county roads in Columbia County, Florida. All county roads are maintained by the county in which they reside, however not all of them are marked with standard MUTCD approved county road shields.

== List of County Roads in Columbia County, Florida ==
#	Road Name(s)	Direction and Termini					Notes
CR 6	NW Baycreek Street	W/E	CR 6	Hamilton–Columbia county line northwest of Benton	US 441	North-northwest of Benton	Former SR 6
CR 18		W/E	US 27 / SW Yulan Street	Fort White	US 41 / US 441	South-southwest of Mikesville	Former SR 18
CR 18		W/E	US 41 / US 441	North-northwest of Mikesville	CR 18	Columbia–Union county line east-northeast of Mikesville	Former SR 18
CR 25A	NW Valdosta Road	S/N	US 441 (N. Marion Road) / CR 250 (Gum Swamp Road)	Five Points	US 41	Northwest of Five Points	Former SR 25A
CR 100A	NW Bascom Norris Drive	W/E	US 41 (NW Main Boulevard)	Lake City	US 90 (E. Duval Street) / SR 100	Watertown	Former SR 100A, signed as SR 100A at west end.
CR 129	NW Lake Jeffery Road	S/N	US 90 (W. Duval Street) / SW Lakeview Avenue	Lake City	CR 250	Lake City	Former SR 129
CR 131	SW Tustenuggee Avenue / SW Forest Lawn Way	S/N	McClinton Road	East-northeast of Fort White	US 41 / US 441	South of Lake City	Former SR 131; portion south of CR 18 not indicated on FDOT county map to be part of any county road, but is signed as part of CR 131; northern terminus indicated on FDOT county map to be on SW Forest Lawn Way, however it is signed just to the southeast, on SW Tustenuggee Avenue.
CR 131	NW Falling Creek Road	S/N	US 41	Northwest of Five Points	CR 346 (NW Lassie Black Street)	East-southeast of White Springs	Former SR 131
CR 133	SE Country Club Road	S/N	CR 133C (SE Alfred Markham Street) / Hopeful Church Road	South-southeast of Watertown	US 90 (SE Baya Avenue) / SE Country Club Road	Watertown	Former SR 133
CR 133B	SE Racetrack Lane	W/E	US 41 / US 441	South of Lake City	CR 133 (SE Country Club Road) / SE Horizon Glen	South of Watertown	Former SR 133B; indicated on FDOT county map to be CR 138B, but is signed as CR 133B
CR 133C	SE Alfred Markham Street	W/E	US 41 / US 441	South of Watertown	CR 133 (SE Country Club Road) / Hopeful Church Road / SE Alfred Markham Street	South-southeast of Watertown	
CR 135		S/N	US 90	West of Lake City	CR 250	Northwest of Lake City	Former SR 135
CR 138		W/E	SR 47	South-southwest of Griffville	US 27	Southeast of Fort White	Former SR 138
CR 238		W/E	256th Street; Elim Church Road	North of Ichetucknee Springs State Park northwest of Fort White	CR 131 (Tustenuggee Road)	East of Fort White	Former SR 238
CR 240		W/E	CR 240 CR 245	Suwannee county line southwest of Lake City South-southeast of Lake City	US 41 CR 240	South-southeast of Lake City Union county line southeast of Lake City	Former SR 240
CR 241		S/N	CR 241	Union county line southeast of Lake City	SR 100	Southeast of Lake City	Former SR 241
CR 242		W/E	CR 242 SR 47	Suwannee county line southwest of Lake City South of Lake City	SR 47 US 41 / US 441	South of Lake City South-southeast of Lake City	Former SR 242
CR 242A		W/E	SR 47	South of Lake City	US 41 / US 441	South-southeast of Lake City	Former SR 242; signed as CR 242 at west end, but street name signs and shields on US 41 / US 441 say CR 242A
CR 245		S/N	CR 245	Union county line east-northeast of Ellisville	US 90	Watertown	Former SR 245
CR 245A		S/N	CR 245	Southeast of Lake City	SR 100	Southeast of Watertown	Former SR 245A
CR 246	Northwest Lassie Black Street	W/E	US 41 / SR 100	Suwanee Valley	US 441	North-northeast of Five Points	Former SR 246
CR 247	Long Street		CR 129				
CR 249	NW Glen Lake Avenue / NW Eadie Street		US 90	Lake City	CR 129	Lake City	
CR 250		W/E	CR 250 US 441 / CR 25A	Suwannee county line west-northwest of Lake City Lake City–Five Points line	CR 129 CR 250	Lake City; Osceola National Forest northeast of Lake City at the Baker county line	Former SR 250
CR 250A		W/E	CR 250	Osceola National Forest northeast of Lake City	CR 250A	Baker county line northeast of Lake City	Former SR 250A
CR 252	Pinewood Road	W/E	CR 252 US 41 / US 441	Suwannee county line west-southwest of Lake City South of Lake City	CR 252B CR 241	West of Lake City Southeast of Lake City	Former SR 252
CR 252A		S/N	CR 252	West-southwest of Lake City	US 90	West of Lake City	Former SR 252A
CR 252B	Morrell Road	S/N	SR 247 / SW Callahan Avenue	Southwest of Lake City	US 90 / NW Harvey Way	West of Lake City	Former SR 252B
CR 341	SW Dyal Avenue / SW Sisters Welcome Road	S/N	King Road	South-southwest of Lake City	US 90	Lake City	Former SR 341
CR 349		W/E	CR 131 (Tustenuggee Road) / Markham Road	Northwest of Ellisville	CR 245	Northeast of Ellisville	Former SR 349
CR 778	Oak Ridge Road	E/W	US 27	Southeast of Fort White	US 41 / US 441	Southeast of Fort White	Former SR 778
CR 1219	SW Bascom Norris Drive / SW McFarlane Avenue	S/N	SR 47	Lake City	SR 10A (SW Baya Avenue)	Lake City	Unsigned
