= Florida State Road 47 =

Highway in Florida, US

State Road 47

Route information
- Maintained by FDOT
- Length: 71.434 mi (114.962 km)
- Existed: 1945 renumbering–present

Major junctions
- South end: US 129 in Trenton
- US 27 in White Springs; I-75 near Lake City; US 41 / US 90 / US 441 in Lake City
- North end: US 441 / SR 89 towards Fargo, GA

Location
- Country: United States
- State: Florida
- Counties: Gilchrist, Columbia

Highway system
- Florida State Highway System; Interstate; US; State; Former; Pre‑1945; Toll; Scenic
← SR 46	→ SR 48

State Road 47 (SR 47) is a north–south state highway in north Florida, running from US 41/441 in Lake City south to US 129 in Trenton. North of Lake City, SR 47 is the "secret" designation for US 441 to the Georgia border, continuing as State Route 89.

Names for SR 47 include SR 47 in both Gilchrist and Columbia Counties and South First Street, North First Street, Columbia City Road, East Duval Street, North Marion Street, and US 441 in Columbia County.

== Route description ==
=== Gilcrhist County ===
Florida State Road 47 begins at US 129 (hidden SR 49) in Trenton. The road runs parallel to the right-of-way of the former Wilcox Extension of the ACL Jacksonville-Wilcox Line (soon to become the Trenton-Newberry Rail Trail), until moving away from the old railroad line near an automobile salvage yard. Before moving away from the old railroad line, the road passes the Trenton State Farmer's Market. North of the city limits, the surroundings are primarily rural. For 1.6 miles (2.6 km), the road runs along a power line right-of-way, until it branches off to the east. North of the power lines, the west side of the road includes an elaborate gate of a hunting club known as the Gilchrist Club. The surroundings continue to remain rural as State Road 47 approaches what passes for the first major crossroad, the blinker-light intersection with Gilchrist County Road 232 which runs south of Bell to the west and south of Alachua to the east.

At some point north of the intersection, the road curves straight north and south. The road runs under a northwest-to-southeast power line, and a privately-owned dirt road leading to a watermelon farmed owned by Southern Corporate Packers. Drivers barely (if ever) notice when they enter the unincorporated community of Craggs which contains a lake hidden by trees and a Gilchrist County solid waste facility on the former right-of-way for the Atlantic, Suwannee River and Gulf Railway. Somewhere north of Craggs, SR 47 intersects Gilchrist County Road 340, which leads to Williford and north of Bell to the west and High Springs to the east. The route continues to run straight north and south this time along the west side of Spring Ridge when suddenly it encounters Gilchrist County Road 138, which runs west to northwestern Gilchrist County, and secretly overlaps SR 47 north of there. SR 47 and GCR 138 curve back to the northeast as they approach Gilchrist County Santa Fe River Park at the southeast corner of the bridge over the Santa Fe River, where the routes cross the Gilchrist-Columbia County Line.

=== Columbia County ===
Immediately after the bridge, the routes enter Hollingsworth Bluff and Columbia County Road 138 branches off to the east. The next intersection is Hollinsworth Street which leads to a boat ramp on the river and Pickard Springs. North of this semi-recreational region, the road runs between the Santa Fe Solar Power Plant and Columbia Solar Power Plant, both of which are run by Duke Energy. State Road 47 crosses another power line right-of-way before entering the Town of Fort White where it is given the street name South First Street. SR 47 continues the same rural settings at the same angle, but begins to curve closer to straight south and north as it approaches the heart of town. The road crosses the former right-of-way for the Atlantic Coast Line Railroad's DuPont—Lakeland Line just before passing by the Fort White Town Hall on the southwest corner of SR 47 and Southwest Yulan Street. Turning east at the same intersection leads to Multi-County Road 18. The next block is with Ellis Street where it also crosses the O'Leno to Ichetucknee Trail, and one block later intersects U.S. Route 27 (hidden SR 20). South First Street becomes North First Street as SR 47 goes past US 27.

SR 47 leaves the town limits between the South Columbia Sports Complex and Southwest Jeanlea Place. The first moderately important intersection north of Fort White Columbia County Road 238, a county road running from Ichetucknee Springs State Park to Columbia County Roads 131 and 18 that's somehow connected to Florida State Road 238 from Ellisville to Lake Butler. Less than 6 miles in, the road barely enters the former community that the previously mentioned park was named for. North of Southwest Watson Street, SR 47 curves to the northeast to run parallel to the former right-of-way of the Lake City Branch of the Live Oak, Tampa and Charlotte Harbor Railroad. The next rural unincorporated community entered by State Road 47 is Columbia City. Here, the road passes by an old church before passing the blinker-light intersection with Columbia County Road 240, which heads west to O'Brien and east to north of Ellisville. Within Columbia City the road runs between two gas stations and little else, although Columbia County Fire Rescue Station Number 44 is nearby. The road curves to the northeast as it passes the last two landmarks named for the community; Columbia City Elementary School and the adjacent Columbia City Park.

The road becomes a divided highway after the bridge over Clay Hole Creek, and runs parallel to the dry channelized riverbed of Cannon Creek. The first intersection in this segment is the eastern terminus of Columbia County Road 242, but the more important intersection is to follow as the interchange with Interstate 75 (hidden SR 93) at Exit 423. The Cannon Creek drainageway also runs along the west side of the road beneath the interstate. North of the interchange, two park-and-rides can be found then SR 47 encounters a continuation of CR 242 officially designated as Columbia County Road 242A, though the county signed it as part of CR 242. The Cannon Creek wetlands begin to move away from the route just south of the intersection with Southwest Business Point Drive. The route skirts along the border of Lake City at Southwest Michigan Street, but doesn't enter the city limits until the intersection with Southwest Marvin Burnett Road. One block later is an important, but not designated intersection with Southwest Bascomb Norris Drive, a not-so continuous loop road around Lake City. This road leads to U.S. Route 41 and U.S. Route 441 to the east and U.S. Route 90 to the northwest. The road continues at its northeast angle, and the northbound and southbound lanes move away from each other as they approach a channelized intersection with U.S. Route 41 (hidden SR 25). Northbound SR 47 makes a left turn at US 41 in the median, while southbound SR 47 runs southbound only from US 41. US 41 would seem to be where SR 47 was once signed as terminating. In reality, it joins US 41 as another hidden overlapping route.

=== Hidden under US 41, 90, and 441 ===
Closer to Downtown Lake City, US 41 as well as hidden State Roads 25 and 47 intersect Florida State Road 10A. But the next major intersection after this is U.S. Route 90 (hidden SR 10; where the DeSoto Trail heads west) where the overlap with US 41 and SR 25 ends and is replaced by an overlap with Florida State Road 100. Merely three blocks from US 41, US 90/SRs 10 & 100 encounters an intersection with one of its spur routes, US 441 (SR 25A) and 47 turns north along US 441 and hidden SR 25A. The Desoto Trail and Florida Short Routes turn south here but the Lone Star Trail continues along US 90. North of US 90, US 441 as well as hidden SRs 25A and 47 run through the Lake City Historic Commercial District until it reaches a railroad crossing for the Florida Gulf and Atlantic Railroad's Tallahassee Subdivision. Three blocks later, Norfolk Southern Railway's Navair District crosses the intersection with Northeast Martin Luther King, Junior Street and US 47/FLs 25A and 47 in a southeast to northwest direction.

Lake City Truck Route US 441 terminates on the west side of the intersection with Columbia County Road 100A (Northwest Bascom Norris Drive, and Northeast Bascom Norris Drive). Past Lake City, US 441/SR 47 enters Five Points where SR 25A branches off to the northwest as County Road 25A, which also shares intersections with CR 250 to the east and Northeast Double Run Road to the northeast. US 441 has an interchange with Interstate 10 (Exit 303), then skirts the western edge of Osceola National Forest. As a result, despite the farms and private residencies, the few scattered businesses along the segment consist of recreational vehicle campgrounds and associated services, with the exception of Station number 41 of the Columbia County Fire Rescue. A pair of Florida Department of Agriculture inspection stations can be found just north of the intersection with Northeast Benton Road. The last resemblance to a major intersection in the state is the eastern terminus of Columbia County Road 6. The rest of the journey remains rural as it passes along the western edge of the Okefenokee Swamp and east bank of the Suwannee River as it curves to the east-northeast before it enters Georgia. Florida State Road 47 ends at the Florida-Georgia state line and becomes Georgia State Route 97, while U.S. Route 441 is practically unaffected by the transition.

== History ==
The current Florida State Road 47 was established during the great renumbering of 1945, as a replacement for Florida State Road 82 and Florida State Road 83.

State Road 47 had a major widening project between US 41-441 and Interstate 75 at Exit 423 during the late-2000s.

== Major intersections ==
County	Location	mi	km	Destinations	Notes
Gilchrist	Trenton	0.000	0.000	US 129 (SR 49) – Chiefland, Bell	
Gilchrist		8.575	13.800	CR 232 – Airport	
Gilchrist		14.512	23.355	CR 340 – Ginnie Springs, Blue Springs, Poe Springs	
Gilchrist		17.422	28.038	CR 138 west	
Columbia	Hollingsworth Bluff	18.633	29.987	CR 138 east	
Columbia	Fort White	22.676	36.493	US 27 (SR 20) – Ichetucknee Springs State Park South Entrance, High Springs	
Columbia		24.855	40.000	CR 238 (Southwest Elim Church Road) – Ichetucknee Springs State Park North Entrance	
Columbia	Columbia City	32.832	52.838	CR 240	
Columbia		36.908	59.398	CR 242 west	
Columbia		37.20	59.87	I-75 (SR 93) – Gainesville, Valdosta	I-75 exit 423
Columbia		37.441	60.255	CR 242 east	
Columbia	Lake City	40.479	65.145	Southwest Bascom Norris Drive to US 41 south	
Columbia	Lake City	40.918	65.851	US 41 south / US 441 Truck south (SR 25) – High Springs	south end of US 41 / US 441 Truck / SR 25 overlap; southbound exit and northbound entrance
Columbia	Lake City	41.890	67.415	SR 10A (Southwest Baya Drive) – VA Hospital	
Columbia	Lake City	42.308	68.088	US 90 west (West Duval Street / SR 10) to I-75 – Live Oak US 41 north / US 441 Truck north (Main Boulevard / SR 25 / SR 100) to I-10 – Jasper	north end of US 41 / US 441 Truck / SR 25 overlap; south end of US 90 / SR 10 / SR 100 overlap
Columbia	Lake City	42.449	68.315	US 441 south (Marion Avenue / SR 25A) US 90 east (Duval Street / SR 10 / SR 100) to SR 100 – Macclenny	north end of US 90 / SR 10 / SR 100 overlap; south end of US 441 / SR 25A overlap
Columbia	see US 441 (mile 404.065-433.050)				
Columbia		71.434	114.962	US 441 north / SR 89 north – Fargo, Homerville	Georgia state line
1.000 mi = 1.609 km; 1.000 km = 0.621 mi: Concurrency terminus
