= Florida State Road 10A (Lake City) =

Highway in Florida, US

State Road 10A

Route information
- Maintained by FDOT
- Length: 3.471 mi (5.586 km)

Major junctions
- West end: US 90 in Lake City
- East end: US 90 in Watertown

Location
- Country: United States
- State: Florida
- Counties: Columbia

Highway system
- Florida State Highway System; Interstate; US; State; Former; Pre‑1945; Toll; Scenic
← SR 10	→ SR 11

State Road 10A (SR 10A) is a suffixed alternate route of State Road 10 (US 90) in Lake City, Florida.

== Route description ==
The central segment of State Road 10A can be found Baya Avenue south of Downtown Lake City between near Newco to near Lake Hamburg in Lake City. Most of the road is a four-lane undivided highway with center-left turn lanes, except at its termini where the road is divided. State Road 10A resumes at an intersection with turning ramps that contains an eastbound turning ramp with a signalized crosswalk in the middle. Two intersections exist (one of them being CR 1219) before the road curves around the northeastern edge of Lake Montgomery. The first major intersection is US 41 (SR 25) where it then takes a concurrency with SR 47. Merely three blocks from US 41, SRs 10A & 47 encounters an intersection with one of its spur routes, US 441 (SR 25A) where SR 47 turns north and follows the road to the Georgia border. East of US 441, the road remains primarily straight and residential with occasional exceptions until east of the athletic field of Melrose Park Elementary School, where it makes another reverse curve which leaves the city limits and ends at Southeast Montrose Avenue. Here the road enters Newco, a community that is now a section of Watertown. Passing through a strip of preserved land around a creek and curving around a former segment named Baxter Lane, the road encounters another moderate intersection, specifically CR 133(Avalon Avenue), Two blocks after this, the road passes in front of the Eastside Elementary School between Defender Drive and Llewellyn Avenue, then curves to the northeast before encountering a railroad crossing along the south side of the intersection with SR 100, the last intersection before the eastern terminus at US 90.

== Major intersections ==
The entire route is in Columbia County.

Location	mi	km	Destinations	Notes
Lake City	0.000	0.000	US 90 (West Duval Street)	Western terminus
Lake City	0.821	1.321	US 41 / US 441 Truck (Southwest Main Boulevard)	
Lake City	0.959	1.543	US 441 (South Marion Avenue)	
Watertown	2.636	4.242	Southeast Country Club Road (CR 133)	
Watertown	3.221	5.184	SR 100	
Watertown	3.471	5.586	US 90 (East Duval Street)	Eastern terminus
1.000 mi = 1.609 km; 1.000 km = 0.621 mi
