= Interstate 75 =

Interstate Highway from Michigan to Florida

Interstate 75
- I-75 highlighted in red

Route information
- Length: 1,786.47 mi (2,875.04 km)
- Existed: August 14, 1957–present
- NHS: Entire route

Major junctions
- South end: SR 826 / SR 924 in Miami Lakes, FL
- I-4 near Tampa, FL; I-10 near Lake City, FL; I-85 concurrency in Atlanta, GA; I-20 in Atlanta, GA; I-40 in Knoxville, TN; I-64 through Lexington, KY; I-70 in Vandalia, OH; I-80 / I-90 in Rossford, OH; I-94 in Detroit, MI; I-69 in Flint, MI
- North end: Canadian border on Int'l Bridge at Sault Ste. Marie, MI

Location
- Country: United States
- States: Florida, Georgia, Tennessee, Kentucky, Ohio, Michigan

Highway system
- Interstate Highway System; Main; Auxiliary; Suffixed; Business; Future

Interstate 75 (I-75) is a major north–south Interstate Highway in the Great Lakes and Southeastern regions of the United States. As with most Interstates that end in 5, it is a major cross-country, north–south route at a length of 1,786.47 miles (2,875.04 km), traveling from State Road 826 (SR 826, Palmetto Expressway) and SR 924 (Gratigny Parkway) on the Hialeah–Miami Lakes border (a few miles northwest of Miami, Florida), to Sault Ste. Marie, Michigan, at the Canada–United States border. It is the second-longest north–south Interstate Highway (after I-95) and the seventh-longest Interstate Highway overall.

I-75 passes through six different states. The highway runs the length of the Florida peninsula from the Miami area and up the Gulf Coast through Tampa. Farther north in Georgia, I-75 continues on through Macon and Atlanta before running through Chattanooga and Knoxville and the Cumberland Mountains in Tennessee. I-75 crosses Kentucky, passing through Lexington before crossing the Ohio River into Cincinnati, Ohio. In Ohio, the highway runs up the western side through Dayton and Lima before crossing into Michigan north of Toledo. I-75 runs northeasterly along the Lake Erie shoreline and Detroit River into the city of Detroit before turning northwesterly to Flint and northward to the Mackinac Bridge where the freeway crosses the strait between Lakes Huron and Michigan. Farther north, I-75 approaches the Canadian border at Sault Ste. Marie, downriver from Lake Superior, 1,786.5 miles (2,875.1 km) from its origins near the subtropical Atlantic Ocean.

== Route description ==
Lengths
	mi	km
FL	470.88	757.81
GA	355.11	571.49
TN	161.86	260.49
KY	191.78	308.64
OH	211.30	340.05
MI	395.54	636.56
Total	1786.47	2875.04

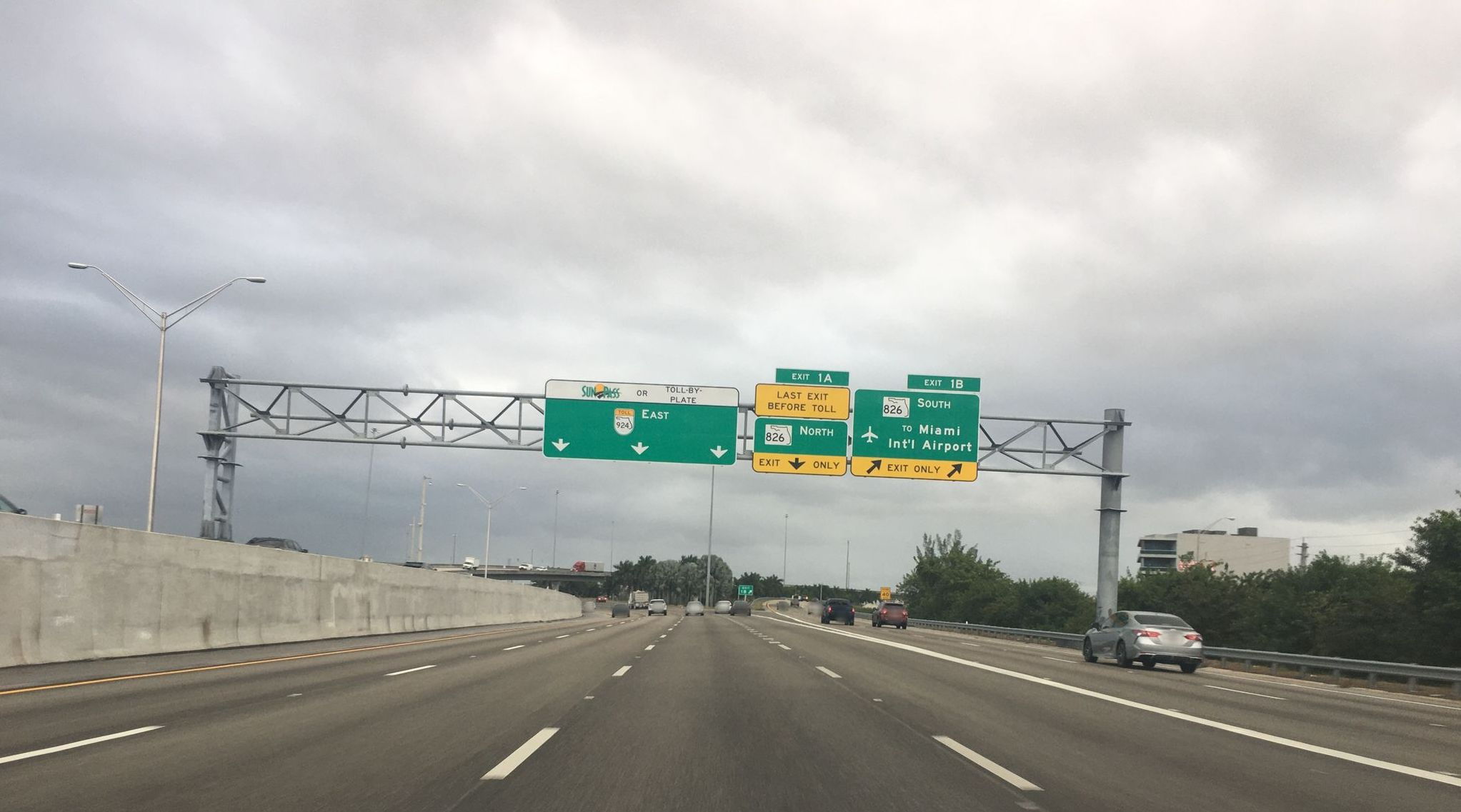
Southern terminus of I-75 at the interchange with SR 826, locally known as the Palmetto Expressway

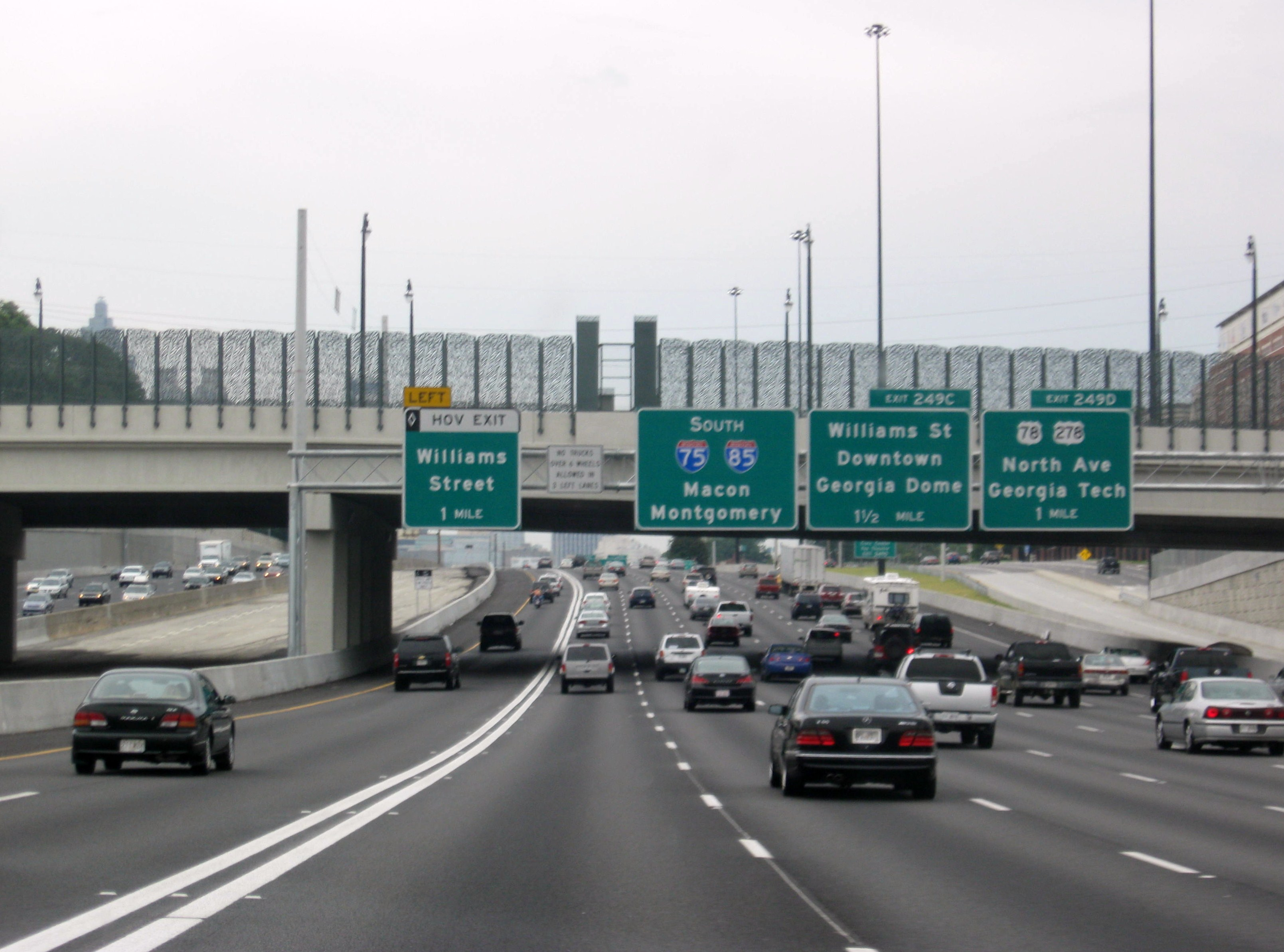
I-75 cosigned with I-85 in Downtown Atlanta, Georgia

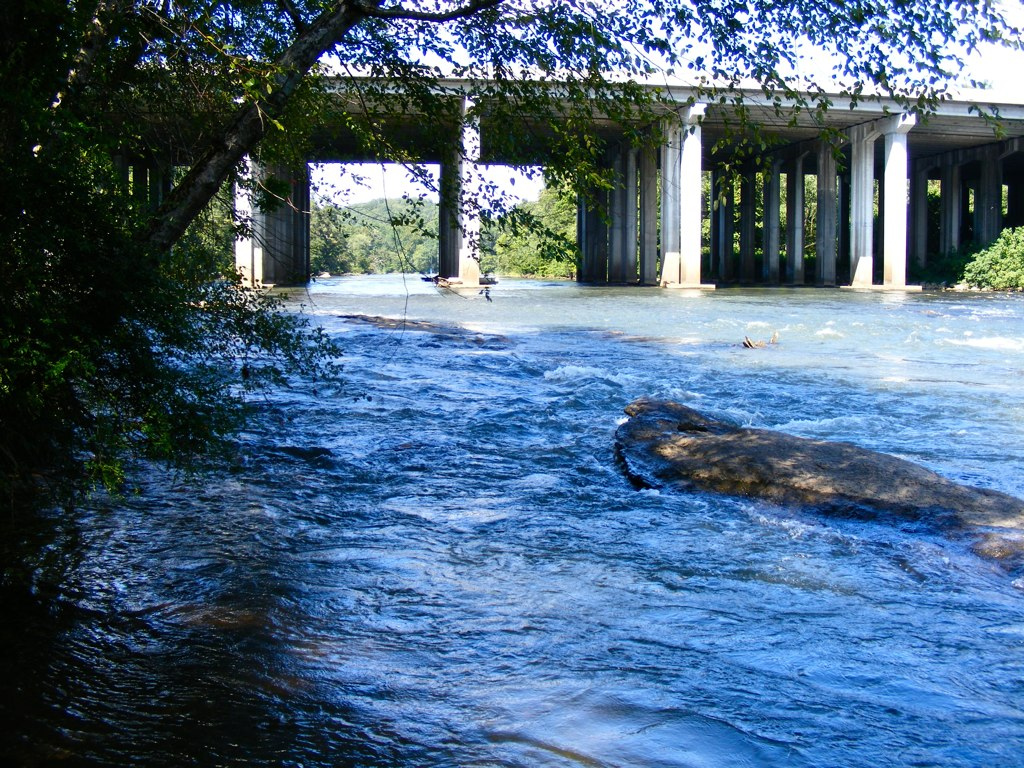
I-75 as it crosses the Chattahoochee River in Atlanta, Georgia

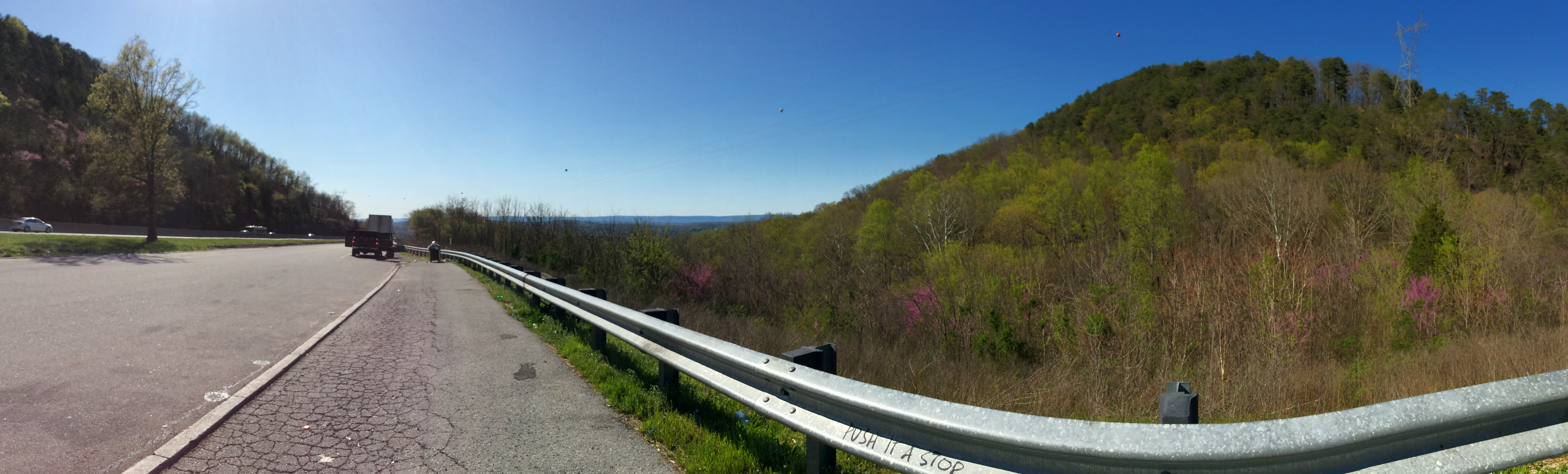
Scenic view along I-75 near Cleveland, Tennessee

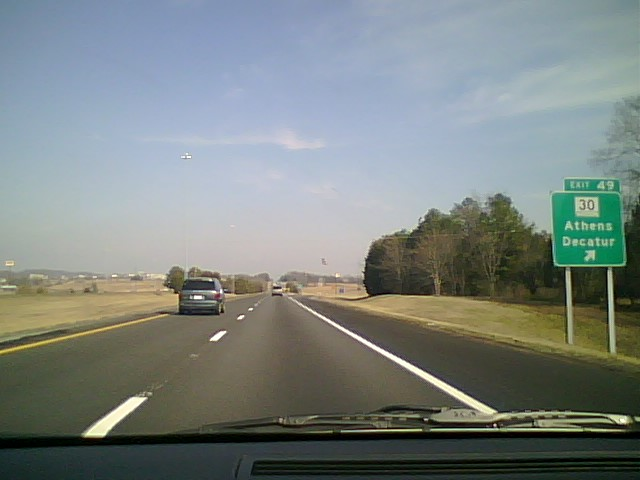
I-75 north at exit 49 in McMinn County, Tennessee, in 2009

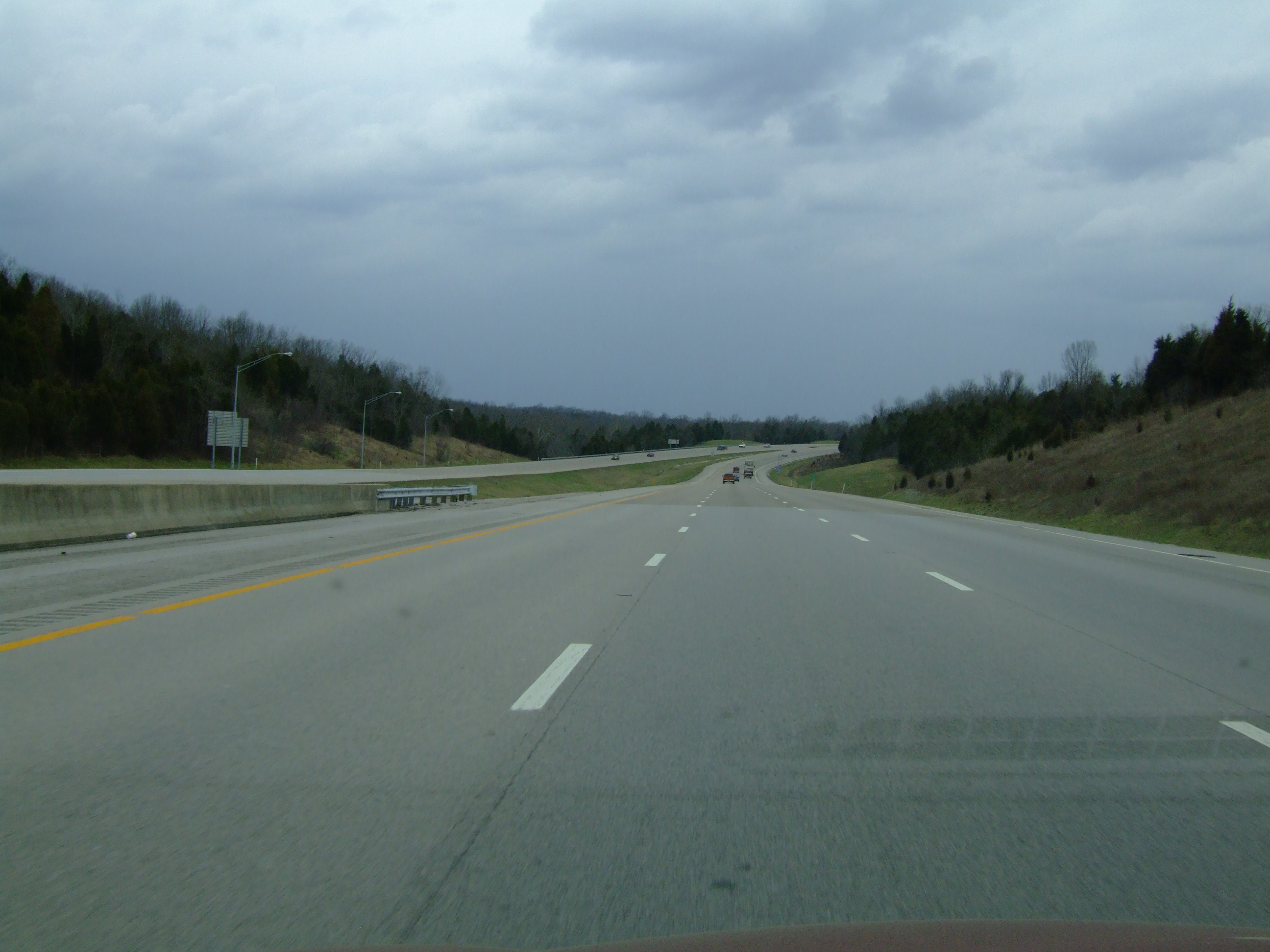
I-75 north of Lexington

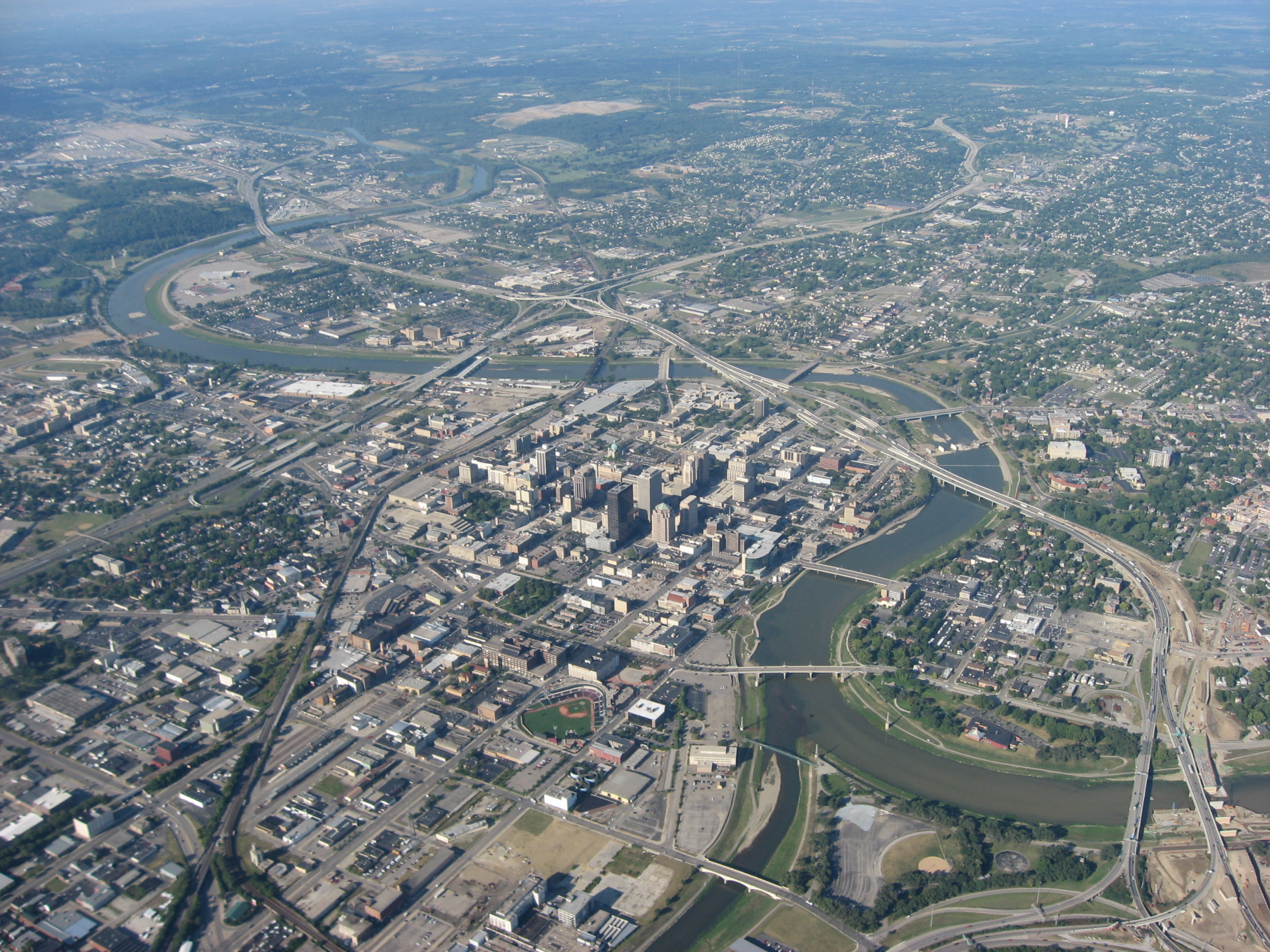
Aerial view of I-75 and Dayton, Ohio

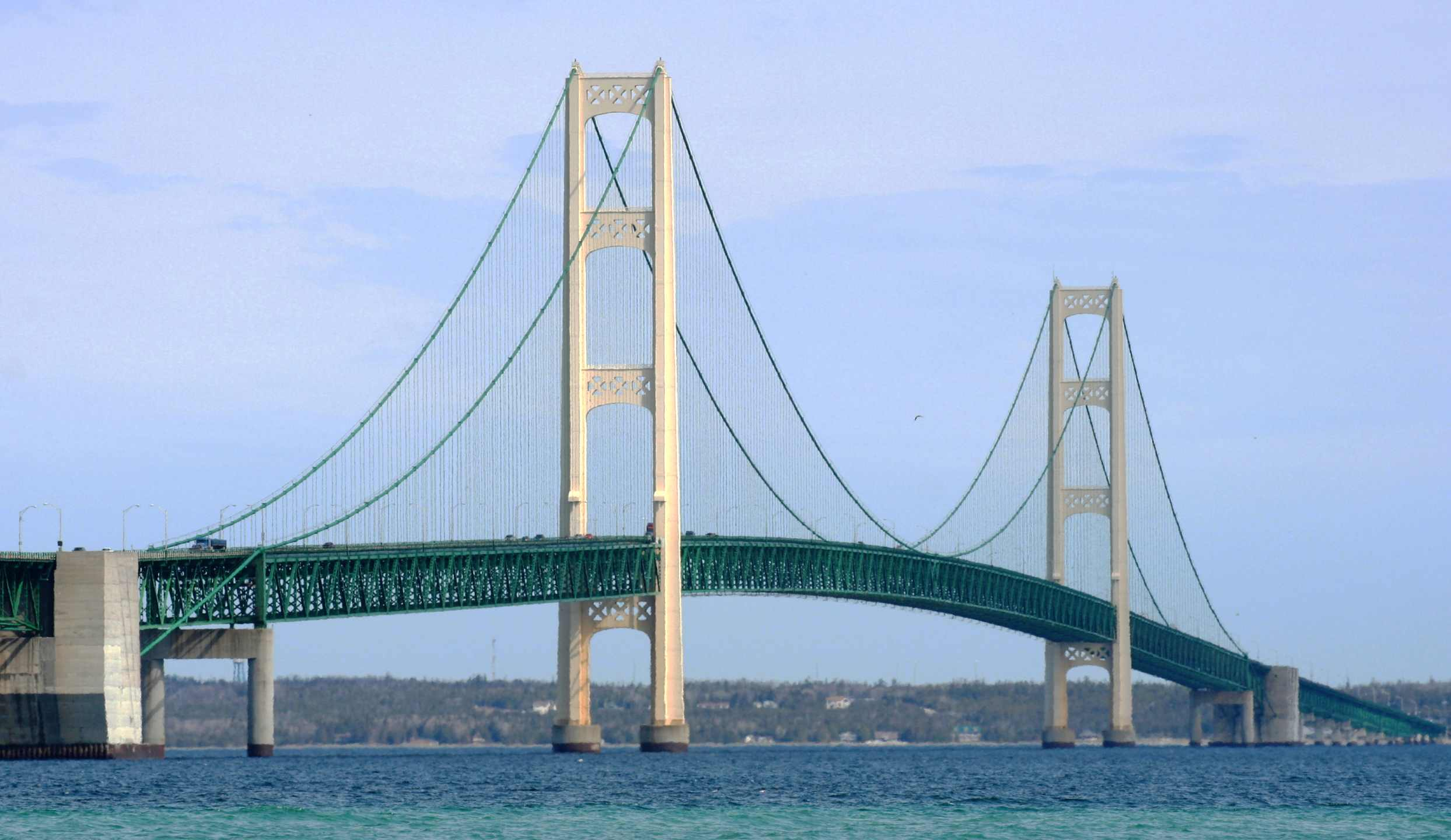
Mackinac Bridge in Michigan

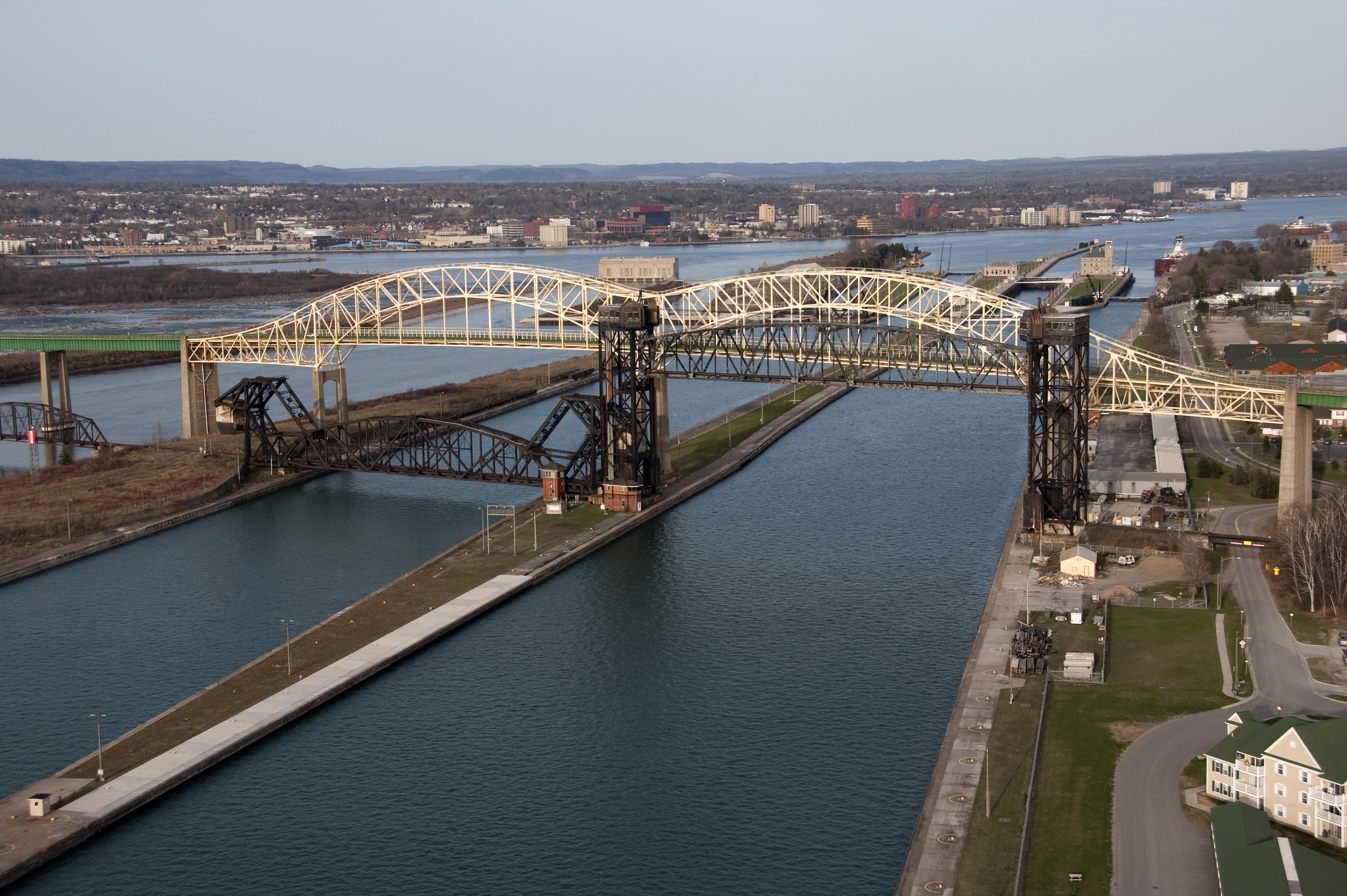
Soo Locks and Sault Ste. Marie International Bridge, linking the Upper Peninsula of Michigan to Ontario

=== Florida ===
I-75 starts at an interchange with SR 924 and SR 826 on the Hialeah–Miami Lakes border in suburban Miami. After an intersection with the Homestead Extension of Florida's Turnpike and an interchange with I-595 and the Sawgrass Expressway (SR 869), the Interstate leaves the Miami metropolitan area and turns westward to travel through the Everglades along the tolled Alligator Alley, which brings the highway to the Gulf Coast and Naples, where it again heads north. Passing through Bonita Springs, Fort Myers, and Sarasota, I-75 is six lanes all the way to Georgia. The freeway enters the Tampa Bay area before the interchange with I-275 northbound, which handles St. Petersburg-bound traffic. Within the Tampa metro are three more major junctions: one with the Lee Roy Selmon Expressway which carries traffic into Downtown Tampa, one with I-4 (a turbine interchange) which carries traffic across the center of the state to the East Coast, and another as I-275 traffic defaults back onto northbound. The freeway proceeds to enter suburban portions of Pasco, Hernando, and Sumter counties on its way to Ocala and Gainesville. At Lake City, Florida, I-10, intersects with I-75. Afterward, the northmost stretch of I-75 in Florida exits the Sunshine State into southern Georgia.

=== Georgia ===
I-75 enters Georgia near Lake Park, and it continues northward through the towns of Valdosta, Tifton, and Cordele until it reaches the Macon area, where it intersects with I-16 eastbound toward I-75's route. After Macon, it passes the small town of Forsyth. The freeway reaches no major junctions again until in the Atlanta metropolitan area. The first metropolitan freeway met is I-675, then followed by I-285, Atlanta's only beltway dubbed as the Perimeter Beltway. It crosses inside the I-285 beltway and heads north several miles toward Downtown Atlanta. I-75 then runs concurrently with I-85 due north over the Downtown Connector through the central business district of Atlanta, where it intersects with I-20. The areas where I-85 and I-75 run concurrently are some of the most traffic-prone Interstate Highways in the nation. After the two Interstates split, I-75 diverts from I-85 and heads toward the northwest suburbs of Atlanta, with the major cities being Marietta and Kennesaw that it bypasses. To the northwest of Marietta, the highway runs concurrently with I-575. After the interchange with I-575, the highway leaves the Atlanta metro area and traverses the Blue Ridge Mountains in the north Georgia region as it heads toward Chattanooga.

=== Tennessee ===
The freeway enters Tennessee directly in the Chattanooga metropolitan area, where it intersects with I-24. Exiting Chattanooga to the northeast, I-75 passes through an area known for dense fog. Twelve people were killed and 42 were injured in a 1990 I-75 fog disaster on that stretch of I-75 in heavy fog on December 11, 1990. I-75 does not meet any other freeways until it overlaps I-40 near Farragut and heads eastbound. Together, they enter the outskirts of Knoxville, where I-75 overlaps itself with a different road, this time I-640, but only for a short time. When the two meet I-275, I-75 encounters some of its highest points of elevation through the Cumberland Mountains, cutting through the uppermost peaks and ridges.

=== Kentucky ===
I-75 continues northbound through the hilly terrain of the Cumberland Plateau region of Kentucky, passing through London and Richmond and eventually reaching Lexington, where it briefly runs concurrently with I-64 before splitting off in the direction of Georgetown. Afterward, the route heads in the direction of Ohio. Near Walton, I-71 runs concurrently with I-75 for the next 20 miles (32 km) or so and heads toward Cincinnati. The two concurrent Interstates then make an interchange with I-275, the Cincinnati beltway. After passing through Covington, the I-71/I-75 highway traverses the Ohio River via the lower level of the Brent Spence Bridge and continues into Downtown Cincinnati.

=== Ohio ===
Immediately after entering Cincinnati, I-75 diverges from I-71, remaining generally due north through the Cincinnati metro area while I-71 curves more to the east and northeast through downtown Cincinnati and its surrounding suburbs. I-74, Ohio State Route 562, and Ohio State Route 126 all intersect the freeway as it makes its way northward. After another interchange with the I-275 beltway, the freeway continues within the metro area, passing through Middletown and heading toward Dayton, where I-675, I-70, and U.S. Route 35 have interchanges with I-75. The interchange of I-75 with I-70 is known as the Freedom Veterans Crossroads. After exiting the city of Dayton, I-75 makes its way northbound through Ohio, passing through smaller cities of Troy, Piqua, Sidney, Wapakoneta, Lima, Findlay and Bowling Green before finally reaching Toledo located on the western shore of Lake Erie and the border of Michigan. I-75 meets the I-475 interchange in the southern suburbs of Toledo in Perrysburg and then I-80, I-90, and the Ohio Turnpike. As the Interstate passes through downtown Toledo, I-475 meets with I-75 again just north of the downtown area of Toledo. It then continues through some industrial areas as it progresses north before approaching I-280, which is the last major junction in Ohio. I-75 then passes by the Lake Erie neighborhoods of Shoreland and Point Place, just before entering the US state of Michigan with the sign welcoming motorists to Michigan.

=== Michigan ===
Upon entering Michigan, I-75 follows the northwestern shore of Lake Erie, passing through the residential neighborhoods of Toledo and Luna Pier until about Monroe in which it then heads northeast to enter Detroit. The freeway has an interchange with I-275 in northern Monroe County. On a further note, it does not meet with any major junctions until in Downtown Detroit. Once near downtown, I-75 meets several interchanges: two that lead into Canada via the Ambassador Bridge and Gordie Howe International Bridge (international bridge border crossings) to Windsor, Ontario; an interchange with I-375; I-94; I-96; M-10; M-8. I-696 also intersects I-75 in the northern metro area. When the freeway reaches Pontiac, there is a junction with M-59 and in Flint further northward. It meets I-475 and I-69 and overlaps U.S. Route 23 (US 23). The Interstate then heads north toward Saginaw where I-675 acts as a spur route into the city. Further north in Bay City, US 10 provides access to Midland as well as downtown Bay City. When it nears Standish, US 23 diverts from I-75 to Lake Huron, where it heads further north. The last major interchange in the state of Michigan before it crosses the international border into Canada is at 4 Mile Road just south of Grayling where US 127 ends with traffic merging onto northbound I-75 and southbound taking drivers through the center of the state. At Mackinaw City, I-75 has interchanges with US 31 and US 23 before crossing the Mackinac Bridge to reach the Upper Peninsula of Michigan. I-75 is the only Interstate located in the Upper Peninsula of Michigan and it continues until it crosses the Canadian border via the Sault Ste. Marie International Bridge.

== History ==
This limited access highway that was planned in the 1950s roughly follows the general route of many older at-grade highways, including US 2, US 27, US 25, and US 41, among others. Some of these older US Highways (several of which are still in existence) previously had replaced the eastern route of the old Dixie Highway.

I-75 was planned to end in Tampa, Florida, in the original plan for 41,000 miles (66,000 km) of Interstate Highways. However, beginning in the 1960s, there was a huge growth in the population of Southwest Florida (Sarasota, Fort Myers, Naples, Cape Coral, etc.), hence the need for new highways, especially a north–south freeway, as well as one connecting Florida's Gulf Coast to South Florida. At first, Florida state legislators proposed a toll in the new highway, and, by 1968, it was decided that the federal government would pay 90 percent toward the extension of I-75 to southwestern and southeastern Florida. This included subsuming a toll highway from Naples to the Fort Lauderdale area, the Alligator Alley, and furthermore to connect this expressway with I-95 in North Miami—though due to some local opposition, I-75 presently ends a few miles short of I-95.

I-75 was completed in Corbin, Kentucky on May 16, 1969. The last segment in Michigan opened to traffic on November 1, 1973. The last section of I-75 in Tennessee was completed on December 20, 1974. On December 21, 1977, I-75 was completed from Tampa to Sault Ste. Marie when its final segment opened between northern Marietta and Cartersville, Georgia. It was estimated to have cost $3.5 billion in 1977 dollars (equivalent to $14.1 billion in 2024) to build the original section. The final stretch of I-75 in South Florida was completed in 1986 in Miami-Dade and Broward counties, and the last stretch to receive the signs for I-75 was the reconstructed (rebuilt and widened) Alligator Alley on November 25, 1992.

On September 7, 2024, the Interstate 75 Kentucky Shooting occurred near London, Kentucky in which multiple shots were fired at cars passing by, injuring 5.

== Junction list ==
Florida
SR 826 / SR 924 on the Hialeah–Miami Lakes city line
I-595 on the Davie–Sunrise-Weston tripoint
US 27 in Weston
US 17 on the Solana–Cleveland CDP line
US 301 in Ellenton
I-275 east-northeast of Terra Ceia
US 301 in Palm River-Clair Mel
I-4 in Mango
I-275 on the Lutz–Wesley Chapel CDP line
US 98 west-northwest of Ridge Manor
Florida's Turnpike southeast of Ocala
US 27 in Ocala
US 441 in Alachua
US 41 / US 441 in Ellisville
US 90 in Lake City
I-10 west-northwest of Five Points
US 129 north-northeast of Suwannee Springs
Georgia
US 84 / US 221 in Valdosta
US 41 northwest of Valdosta. The highways travel concurrently to Hahira.
US 82 in Tifton
US 41 in Tifton
US 280 in Cordele
US 41 in Unadilla
US 41 in Perry
US 341 in Perry
I-475 southwest of Macon
US 41 in Macon
US 80 in Macon
I-16 in Macon
US 23 northwest of Macon
I-475 northwest of Bolingbroke
I-675 in Stockbridge
US 19 / US 41 west of Morrow
I-285 in Forest Park
US 19 / US 41 on the Atlanta–Hapeville city line
I-85 in Atlanta. The highways travel concurrently through Atlanta.
I-20 in Atlanta
US 29 / US 78 / US 278 in Atlanta
I-85 in Atlanta. End of the concurrency with I-85.
US 41 in Atlanta
US 41 in Atlanta
I-285 in Cumberland
I-575 north-northwest of Marietta
US 411 in Cartersville
US 41 in Resaca
US 41 / US 76 in Dalton
US 41 / US 76 southeast of Ringgold
Tennessee
US 41 / US 76 in East Ridge
I-24 on the East Ridge–Chattanooga city line
US 11 / US 64 in Chattanooga. The highways travel concurrently to north of Collegedale.
US 74 in Cleveland
US 321 in Lenoir City
I-40 west of Farragut. The highways travel concurrently to Knoxville.
I-140 in Knoxville
US 11 / US 70 in Knoxville
I-40 / I-640 in Knoxville. I-75/I-640 travels concurrently through Knoxville.
US 25W in Knoxville. The highways travel concurrently through Knoxville.
I-275 / I-640 / US 25W in Knoxville
US 441 in Rocky Top
US 25W in Rocky Top. The highways travel concurrently to Caryville.
US 25W in Jellico
Kentucky
US 25W in Goldbug
US 25W in Corbin
US 25 east-southeast of Mount Vernon
US 25 in Mount Vernon
US 25 in Richmond
US 25 / US 421 south-southeast of Lexington. The highways travel concurrently to Lexington.
US 60 in Lexington
I-64 in Lexington. The highways travel concurrently through Lexington.
US 27 / US 68 in Lexington
US 460 in Georgetown
US 62 in Georgetown
I-71 in Walton. The highways travel concurrently to Cincinnati, Ohio.
US 42 / US 127 in Florence
I-275 in Erlanger
US 25 / US 42 / US 127 in Fort Mitchell
US 25 / US 42 / US 127 in Covington
Ohio
US 22 / US 27 / US 42 / US 52 / US 127 in Cincinnati
US 50 in Cincinnati
US 27 / US 52 / US 127 in Cincinnati. I-75/US 27/US 52 travel concurrently through Cincinnati.
I-74 / US 27 / US 52 / US 127 in Cincinnati
I-275 in Sharonville
I-675 southeast of Miamisburg
US 35 in Dayton
I-70 in Vandalia
US 40 in Vandalia
US 36 in Piqua
US 33 in Wapakoneta
US 68 in Findlay
US 224 in Findlay
US 6 in Bowling Green
I-475 / US 23 in Perrysburg. I-75/US 23 travels concurrently through Perrysburg.
US 20 / US 23 in Perrysburg
I-80 / I-90 in Rossford
US 24 in Toledo
I-475 in Toledo
I-280 in Toledo
Michigan
I-275 north-northeast of Monroe
US 24 in Taylor
I-96 in Detroit
I-375 in Detroit
I-94 in Detroit
I-696 on the Ferndale–Hazel Park–Royal Oak–Madison Heights city line
US 24 west-northwest of Clarkston
I-475 west of Grand Blanc
US 23 south-southwest of Flint. The highways travel concurrently to southwest of Standish.
I-69 in Flint
I-475 west of Beecher
I-675 east of Saginaw
I-675 north-northwest of Zilwaukee
US 10 west of Bay City
US 127 south of Grayling
US 31 north-northeast of Carp Lake
US 23 in Mackinaw City
US 2 in St. Ignace
Sault Ste. Marie International Bridge at the Canada–United States border in Sault Ste. Marie

== Auxiliary routes ==
- Tampa–St. Petersburg, Florida: I-175 (not directly connected), I-275, I-375 (not directly connected)
- Macon, Georgia: I-475
- Atlanta, Georgia: I-675
- Suburban spur to Canton, Georgia: I-575 in the Atlanta area
- Knoxville, Tennessee: I-275
- Cincinnati, Ohio: I-275
- Dayton, Ohio: I-675
- Toledo, Ohio: I-475
- Detroit, Michigan: I-275, I-375
- Flint, Michigan: I-475
- Saginaw, Michigan: I-675
