= James Y. Wilson =

American politician (1917–2006)

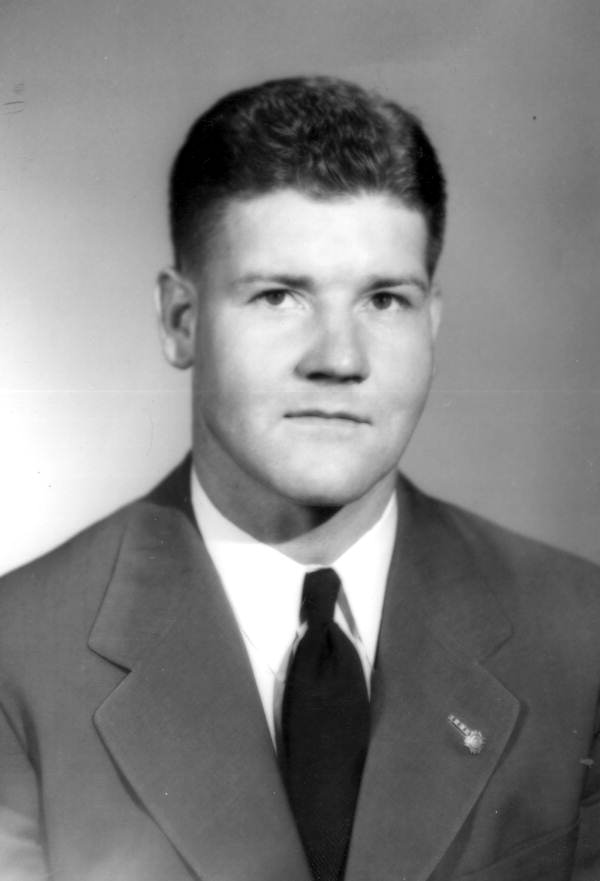
- Wilson in 1947

Member of the Florida House of Representatives from Columbia County
- In office 1947–1948

Personal details
- Born: April 26, 1917 Lake City, Florida, U.S.
- Died: July 17, 2006 (aged 89)
- Party: Democratic
- Education: Davidson College; University of Florida

James Y. Wilson (April 26, 1917 – July 17, 2006) was an American politician. He served as a Democratic member of the Florida House of Representatives.

== Life and career ==
Wilson was born in Lake City, Florida. He attended Davidson College and the University of Florida.

Wilson served in the Florida House of Representatives from 1947 to 1948.

Wilson died on July 17, 2006, at the age of 89.
