= Barber–Mizell feud =

1870 feud in Florida, US

- Part of the Range Wars
- Date: 1870
- Location: Brevard and Orange counties in Florida
- Caused by: boundary dispute, cattle taxation, resentment over Reconstruction

Parties
Barber family, Yates family	Mizell family, Overstreet family

Lead figures
Mose Barber, Needham Yates	Sheriff David Mizell, Judge John Mizell, Henry Overstreet

Casualties
- Deaths: 41
- Arrested: 10
- Detained: 0

The Barber–Mizell feud was a feud in Brevard and Orange counties, Florida in 1870 resulting in 41 deaths and no criminal convictions that arose when cattle baron Mose Barber disputed the jurisdiction of Orange County Sheriff and tax collector David Mizell over his land. When Mizell rode to collect taxes from Barber, he was waylaid and killed. In the resultant feud, 41 men were killed.

== Feud-related deaths ==
These feud-related deaths were enumerated in the 1870 Mortality schedule of Orange County, Florida:

- Isaac Barber, 35, white male, married, born in Georgia, shot in March.
- Moses Barber J.R, 37, white male, married, born in Georgia, Farmer, drowned in March.
- William Bronson, 37, white male, married, farmer, born in South Carolina, shot in March.
- David Mizell, Orange County Sheriff, 36, white male, married, born 12 Nov 1833 Columbia County Florida, shot from ambush 21 Feb 1870.
- Needham Yates, 52, white male, married, born in Georgia, Farmer, shot in March.
- William Yates, 32, white male, married, born in Georgia, Farmer, shot in March.
- Needham Yates Jr.
