= Mikesville =

Mikesville refers to places in the United States:

- Mikesville, Florida, unincorporated community
- Mikesville, Wisconsin, unincorporated community
