= Needham Yates =

American politician

Needham P. Yates

Member of the Florida House of Representatives from Brevard
- In office 1860–1862
- Preceded by: John Heermans
- Succeeded by: Henry Overstreet

Personal details
- Born: c. 1818 Washington County, Georgia
- Died: March 1870 (aged 51–52) Fort Christmas, Florida
- Spouse(s): Elizabeth Scott (b. c 1815, m. August 25, 1836, d. c 1848); Malintha Lee (born 1826, married December 29, 1849, died after 1900)
- Children: William Thomas Yates, Needham, John, Josiah, Amelia, Burrell, David, Elvina, Mary Jane, Andrew, Victoria, Joseph, Noah
- Occupation: farmer

Needham P. Yates (c. 1818 – March 1870) was a member of the Florida House of Representatives from 1860 to 1862.

He was the son of James Yates and Agnes Rowland.

He was the first Yates in the Shingle Creek community in 1847. His land was homestead land with the deed signed by president Franklin Pierce.

== Barber–Mizell feud ==
Needham was accused of killing Dave Mizell in Orange County, setting off the Barber–Mizell feud among the Mizells, Barbers, Yateses and Overstreets. Needham was shot dead, along with his sons, Needham and William, in the feud in 1870.

== See also ==
- List of members of the Florida House of Representatives from Brevard County, Florida

Preceded by John Heermans	Member of the Florida House of Representatives from Brevard County; 1860, 1861	Succeeded by Henry Overstreet
