= Florida State Road 247 =

State highway in Florida, United States

State Road 247
- SR 247 in red

Route information
- Maintained by FDOT
- Length: 22.048 mi (35.483 km)

Major junctions
- West end: US 129 in Branford
- East end: US 90 in Lake City

Location
- Country: United States
- State: Florida

Highway system
- Florida State Highway System; Interstate; US; State; Former; Pre‑1945; Toll; Scenic
← SR 243	→ SR 249

State Road 247 (SR 247) is a southwest to northeast state highway between U.S. Route 129 (US 129 and SR 249) in Branford, Suwannee County, Florida and US 90 (SR 10) in Lake City, Columbia County, Florida. It is almost entirely a two-lane undivided highway except at its termini, and some intersections, where it contains left-turn lanes. Between its termini, SR 247 intersects with no state roads other than former ones.

== Route description ==
State Road 247 begins at US 129 (Suwannee Avenue) as West Plant Street, which is a four lane divided highway for only one block. That block is Drane Street, and one block later the first reassurance sign for the route can be found at Express Street. Despite being signed as north and south, in this town it is geographically more west and east. Within Branford, all north-south streets intersecting are prefixed with "Northwest" north of SR 247, and "Southwest" south of SR 247, until one reaches Reynolds Street which is prefixed simply as North Reynolds on the north side, and South Reynolds on the south side. West Plant Street becomes East Plant Street at the intersection of Northeast Draughton Avenue and Southeast Draughton Avenue, and this pattern exists for one more block. Aside from Branford Elementary School, most of the surroundings along SR 247 consists of farmland, and occasional wooded areas. SR 247 curves more to the northeast after the intersection of Governor Road (254th Street), and remains at that angle throughout the rest of its journey. In the ironically named unincorporated community of Beachville the road encounters a fire tower and a gas station on the west side of County Road 49, a former section of State Road 49, which contains a blinker light and turning ramps on the southwest and southeast corners, and later serves as the eastern terminus of CR 248, a road that both serves as a de facto connecting ramp to and from CR 49, and leads to the Little River Springs Trailhead of the Suwannee River Greenway Trail. North of Beachville, at least four power line right-of-ways cross the road, the first of which is wider and more prominent than the other three. A local street leads to Ichetucknee Hideaway Cottages, a mobile home park promoted for cave diving. After this the road encounters an intersection with CR 137(Sand Hill Road), a south-to-north county road spanning from US 27 in Hildreth through Wellborn to SR 136 in Poucher's Corner. This intersection contains turning ramps on the southwest and northeast corners, but no traffic signals or businesses of any kind. Three more local intersections exist before SR 247 crosses Suwannee-Columbia County Line, including one along the south side of the street along the county line itself.

Continuing at the same angle it had in eastern Suwannee County, SR 247 immediately has an intersection with CR 240, a bi-county west-to-east road that heads east to Union County. This intersection contains another series of blinker lights, turning ramps on the southwest and northeast corners, and a gas station on the northwest corner. Roughly several local intersections after this, the road encounters CR 242, a bi-county road west-to-east that spans from rural Suwannee County to south of Lake City. Here, two gas stations exist on both the northwest and southeast corners, and the intersection has regular traffic signals mounted on a single overhead mast supported on both aforementioned corners. North of this area, the surroundings are slightly more developed but still remains rural. The next signalized intersection is Southwest Callahan Avenue which is a south-to-north street that crosses the road, that also serves as the southern terminus of CR 252B (Morrell Road), a suffixed alternate of County Road 252. The road just touches the Lake City Limits as it runs along a bridge over Interstate 75 with no access, and a golf course owned by the Quail Heights Country Club can be found on the southeast corner of that bridge. After the intersection of Southwest Bascom Norris Road, the route passes the Columbia County Fair, and Lake City Flea Market, State Road 247 becomes a divided highway once again and finally terminates at US 90.

== Major intersections ==
County	Location	mi	km	Destinations	Notes
Suwannee	Branford	0.000	0.000	US 129 (Suwannee Avenue / SR 249) – Mayo, Live Oak	
Suwannee	Beachville	4.981	8.016	CR 49 – Bell, Trenton, Live Oak	
Suwannee		5.193	8.357	CR 248 west	
Suwannee		9.267	14.914	CR 137	
Columbia		10.907	17.553	CR 240 east	
Columbia		16.437	26.453	CR 242	
Columbia		19.274	31.018	CR 252B north	
Columbia	Lake City	22.048	35.483	US 90 (SR 10)	
1.000 mi = 1.609 km; 1.000 km = 0.621 mi
