= Henry Overstreet =

American politician

Henry Clay Overstreet (b. Oct 11, 1821

Member of the Florida House of Representatives from Brevard
- In office 1862–1864
- Preceded by: Needham Yates
- Succeeded by: James F. P. Johnson
- In office 1865–1867
- Preceded by: James F. P. Johnson
- Succeeded by: Brevard not represented 1867–1869

Personal details
- Born: October 11, 1821 Emanuel County, Georgia
- Died: November 23, 1879 (aged 58) Kissimmee, Florida
- Resting place: Shingle Creek Cemetery, Kissimmee, Florida
- Spouse(s): Mary Cowart (m. 4 Jul 1843, Emanuel County, Georgia)
- Children: Elmina Victoria (b. November 1847), Ann Martha (b. 1850), Malcolm N. (b. May 6, 1850), Eleazer Lewis Daniel (b. February 8, 1852), Lucinda (b. 1854), Vianna Matilda (b. 1856), Henry, Jr., (b. March 6, 1856), William Stonewall Jackson (b. 1858), John James Matthew (b. 1858), Henrietta (b. 1860), Alice Mary (b. 1862), George Washington (b. April 11, 1870)
- Occupation: farmer, shoemaker

Henry Clay Overstreet (1821-1879) was a member of the Florida House of Representatives from 1862 to 1864 and from 1865 to 1867.

He was born in Emanuel County, Georgia, the son of Daniel Overstreet, and Martha Alberson. He moved to Orlando, Florida in 1856 and to Kissimmee, Florida in 1860.

== Barber–Mizell feud ==
He was among the belligerents of the Barber–Mizell feud among the Mizells, Barbers, Yateses and Overstreets.

== See also ==
- List of members of the Florida House of Representatives from Brevard County, Florida

| Preceded by Needham Yates | Member of the Florida House of Representatives from Brevard County; 1862–1864 | Succeeded by James F. P. Johnson |
| Preceded by James F. P. Johnson | Member of the Florida House of Representatives from Brevard County; 1865–1867 | Succeeded by Brevard not represented 1867–1869 |
