= John Heermans =

American politician

John S. Heermans

Member of the Florida House of Representatives from St. Lucia County
- In office 1852–1853

Member of the Florida House of Representatives from Brevard County
- In office 1856–1860
- Preceded by: None
- Succeeded by: Needham Yates

Personal details
- Born: June 7, 1790 Saugerties, New York, US
- Died: February 17, 1865 (aged 74) Florida, US

John S. Heermans (June 7, 1790 – February 17, 1865) was a member of the Florida House of Representatives from St. Lucia County in the 1852 session, and after the county changed its name, from Brevard County in the sessions of 1856, 1858, and 1859. He had also served as a county commissioner for St. Lucia County in 1852. He served as a probate judge in 1851, and from 1853 to 1855.

He served on a committee for the defense of the state during the American Civil War.

== See also ==
- List of members of the Florida House of Representatives from Brevard County, Florida

Preceded by County renamed from St. Lucia	Member of the Florida House of Representatives from Brevard County; 1856, 1858, 1859	Succeeded by Needham Yates
