= James F. P. Johnson =

American politician

Member of the Florida House of Representatives from Brevard County
- In office 1864–1865
- Preceded by: Henry Overstreet
- Succeeded by: Henry Overstreet

Personal details
- Born: January 25, 1835 South Carolina
- Died: February 12, 1906 (aged 71) Daytona, Florida
- Resting place: Greenwood Cemetery, Daytona, Florida
- Spouse(s): Frances V. Kincaid (m. September 14, 1859, Alachua, Florida)
- Occupation: farmer

Military service
- Allegiance: Confederate States of America
- Battles/wars: Seminole Wars, American Civil War

James F. P. Johnson (January 25, 1835 – February 12, 1906) was a member of the Florida House of Representatives from Brevard County in the 1864 session. He was a delegate to the Florida Constitutional Convention of 1865.

He was born in South Carolina on January 25, 1835, the son of Abner D. Johnson and Frances R. Pickett.

== See also ==
- List of members of the Florida House of Representatives from Brevard County, Florida

Preceded by Henry Overstreet	Member of the Florida House of Representatives from Brevard County; 1864	Succeeded by Henry Overstreet
