= Mikesville, Florida =

- Unincorporated community
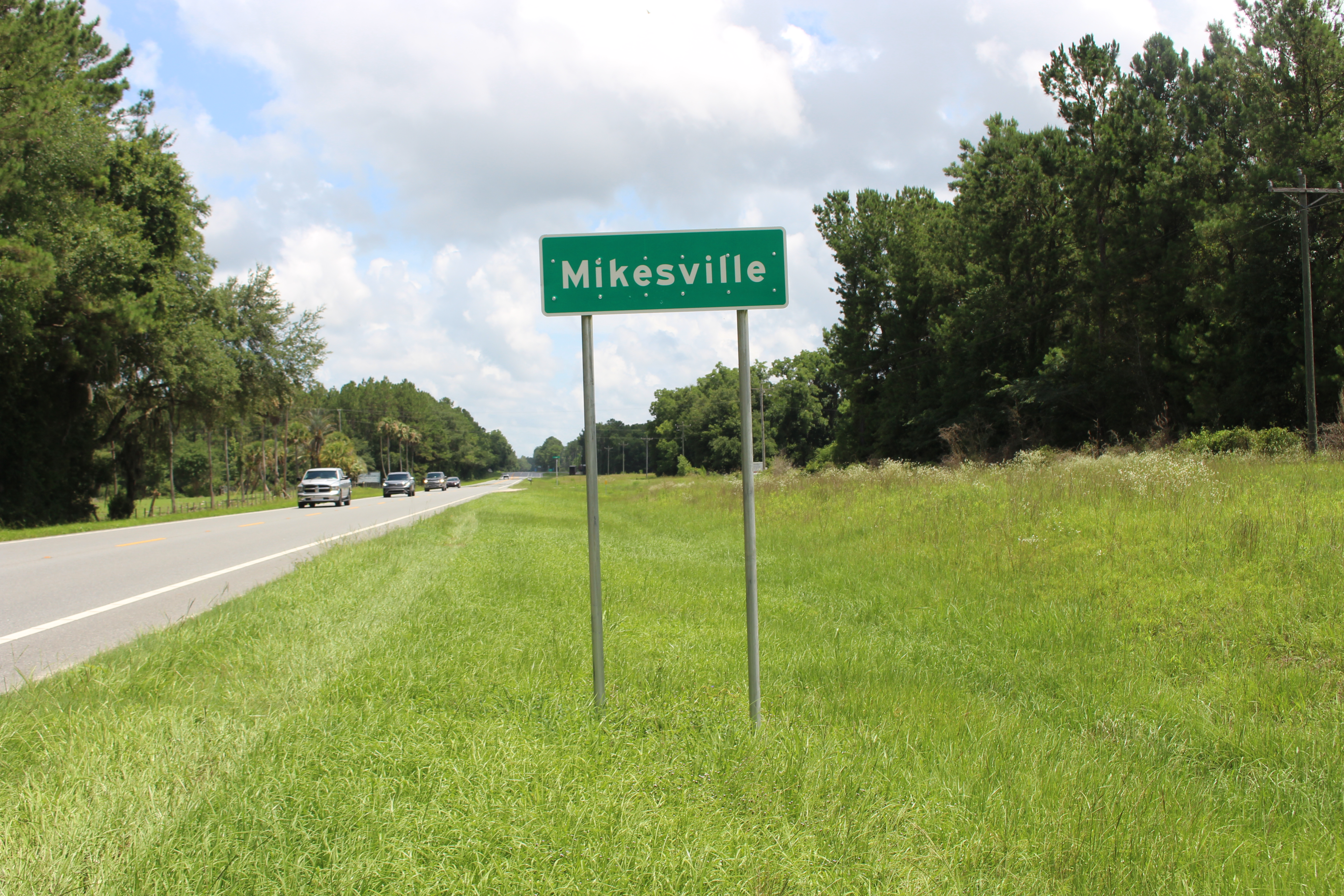

- Location within Florida
- Coordinates: 29°56′48″N 82°36′07″W
- Country: United States
- State: Florida
- County: Columbia
- Elevation: 151 ft (46 m)
- Time zone: UTC-5 (Eastern (EST))
  - Summer (DST): UTC-4 (EDT)
- Area code: 386
- GNIS feature ID: 294854

Mikesville is an unincorporated community in Columbia County, Florida, United States. It is located along US Routes 41 and 441 with a short overlap of Columbia County Road 18 just north of O'Leno State Park.
