= Watertown, Florida =

- CDP
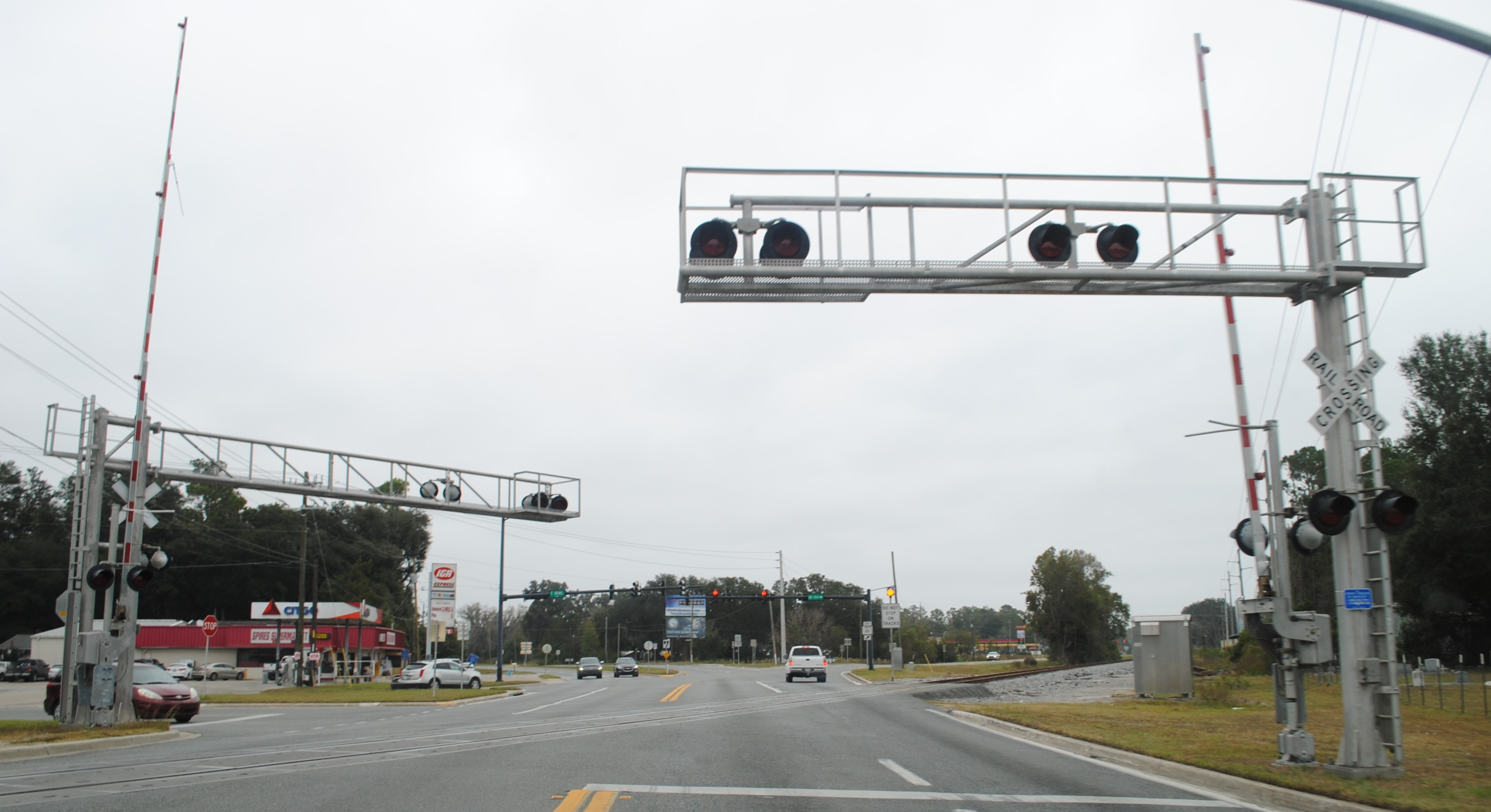
- Intersection of U.S. Route 90 and HWY 100 in Watertown.

- Location in Columbia County and the state of Florida
- Coordinates: 30°11′08″N 82°36′09″W
- Country: United States
- State: Florida
- County: Columbia

Area
  - Total: 2.53 sq mi (6.55 km^{2})
  - Land: 2.48 sq mi (6.42 km^{2})
  - Water: 0.050 sq mi (0.13 km^{2})
- Elevation: 194 ft (59 m)

Population (2020)
  - Total: 3,018
  - Density: 1,217.0/sq mi (469.88/km^{2})
- Time zone: UTC-5 (Eastern (EST))
  - Summer (DST): UTC-4 (EDT)
- FIPS code: 12-75300
- GNIS feature ID: 2402987

Watertown is a census-designated place (CDP) in Columbia County, Florida, United States. It had a population of 3,018 at the 2020 census, up from 2,829 at the 2010 census. It is part of the Lake City, Florida Micropolitan Statistical Area.

== Geography ==
According to the United States Census Bureau, the CDP has a total area of 2.5 square miles (6.5 km^{2}), of which 2.4 square miles (6.2 km^{2}) is land and 0.1 square miles (0.26 km^{2}) is water.

== Demographics ==
Historical population
Census	Pop.	Note	%±
1990	3,340		—
2000	2,837		−15.1%
2010	2,829		−0.3%
2020	3,018		6.7%
U.S. Decennial Census

=== 2020 census ===
As of the 2020 census, Watertown had a population of 3,018. The median age was 42.9 years. 22.8% of residents were under the age of 18 and 23.2% of residents were 65 years of age or older. For every 100 females there were 98.7 males, and for every 100 females age 18 and over there were 93.6 males age 18 and over.

99.4% of residents lived in urban areas, while 0.6% lived in rural areas.

There were 1,231 households in Watertown, of which 30.0% had children under the age of 18 living in them. Of all households, 35.9% were married-couple households, 20.2% were households with a male householder and no spouse or partner present, and 34.2% were households with a female householder and no spouse or partner present. About 27.0% of all households were made up of individuals and 13.1% had someone living alone who was 65 years of age or older.

There were 1,436 housing units, of which 14.3% were vacant. The homeowner vacancy rate was 2.7% and the rental vacancy rate was 10.7%.

Racial composition as of the 2020 census
Race	Number	Percent
White	1,800	59.6%
Black or African American	982	32.5%
American Indian and Alaska Native	16	0.5%
Asian	23	0.8%
Native Hawaiian and Other Pacific Islander	0	0.0%
Some other race	25	0.8%
Two or more races	172	5.7%
Hispanic or Latino (of any race)	139	4.6%

=== 2000 census ===
As of the census of 2000, there were 2,837 people, 1,164 households, and 744 families residing in the CDP. The population density was 1,186.3 inhabitants per square mile (458.0/km^{2}), containing 1,339 housing units at an average density of 559.9 per square mile (216.2/km^{2}). The racial makeup of the CDP was 66.94% White, 30.24% African American, 0.56% Native American, 0.25% Asian, 0.04% Pacific Islander, 0.21% from other races, and 1.76% from two or more races. 1.34% of the population were Hispanic or Latino of any race.

There were 1,164 households, out of which 25.5% had children under the age of 18 living with them, 42.4% were married couples living together, 15.2% had a female householder with no husband present, and 36.0% were non-families. 31.4% of all households were made up of individuals, and 15.7% had someone living alone who was 65 years of age or older. The average household size was 2.41 and the average family size was 3.00.

In the CDP, the population was spread out, with 25.0% under the age of 18, 7.3% from 18 to 24, 24.5% from 25 to 44, 25.1% from 45 to 64, and 18.3% who were 65 years of age or older. The median age was 40 years. For every 100 females, there were 93.0 males. For every 100 females age 18 and over, there were 91.8 males.

The median income for a household in the CDP was $29,402, and the median income for a family was $36,179. Males had a median income of $30,353 versus $21,339 for females. The per capita income for the CDP was $13,044. 17.1% of the population and 12.9% of families were below the poverty line. Out of the total population, 18.7% of those under the age of 18 and 14.7% of those 65 and older were living below the poverty line.
