= Ellisville, Florida =

- Unincorporated community
- Location within Florida Location within the United States
- Coordinates: 29°59′40″N 82°35′27″W
- Country: United States
- State: Florida
- County: Columbia
- Elevation: 75 ft (23 m)
- GNIS feature ID: 294755

Ellisville is an unincorporated community in Columbia County, Florida. Coordinates: 29°59'40"N 82°35'27"W.

Ellisville is the community where Interstate 75 has an interchange with US 41-441 at exit 414.
