= Five Points, Florida =

- CDP
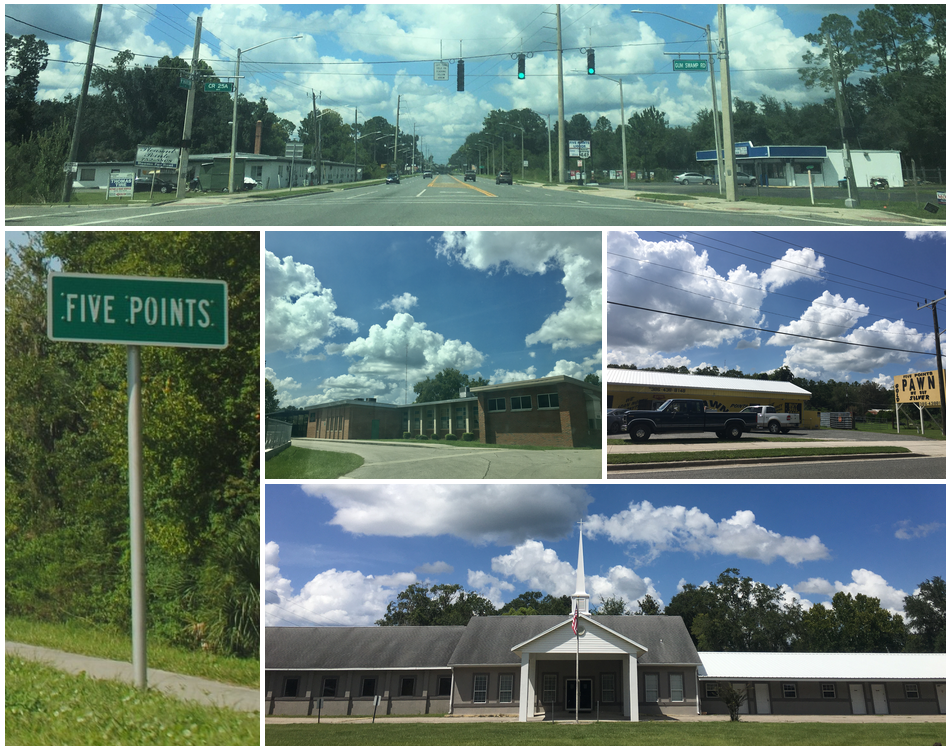
- Top, left to right: Five Points main intersection, Five Points sign, Five Points Elementary, Five Points Pawn, Pine Grove Baptist Church

- Location in Columbia County and the state of Florida
- Coordinates: 30°13′16″N 82°38′46″W
- Country: United States
- State: Florida
- County: Columbia

Area
  - Total: 2.49 sq mi (6.46 km^{2})
  - Land: 2.49 sq mi (6.46 km^{2})
  - Water: 0 sq mi (0.00 km^{2})
- Elevation: 177 ft (54 m)

Population (2020)
  - Total: 1,076
  - Density: 431.5/sq mi (166.59/km^{2})
- Time zone: UTC-5 (Eastern (EST))
  - Summer (DST): UTC-4 (EDT)
- ZIP code: 32055
- Area code: 386
- FIPS code: 12-22475
- GNIS feature ID: 2402485

Five Points is a census-designated place (CDP) in Columbia County, Florida, United States. The population was 1,076 at the 2020 census, down from 1,265 at the 2010 census. It is part of the Lake City, Florida Micropolitan Statistical Area.

== Geography ==
According to the United States Census Bureau, the CDP has a total area of 2.6 square miles (6.7 km^{2}), all land.

== Demographics ==
Historical population
Census	Pop.	Note	%±
1990	1,136		—
2000	1,362		19.9%
2010	1,265		−7.1%
2020	1,076		−14.9%
U.S. Decennial Census

=== 2020 census ===
As of the 2020 census, Five Points had a population of 1,076. The median age was 34.2 years. 23.6% of residents were under the age of 18 and 11.8% of residents were 65 years of age or older. For every 100 females there were 156.8 males, and for every 100 females age 18 and over there were 161.0 males age 18 and over.

59.9% of residents lived in urban areas, while 40.1% lived in rural areas.

There were 326 households in Five Points, of which 36.8% had children under the age of 18 living in them. Of all households, 26.1% were married-couple households, 25.8% were households with a male householder and no spouse or partner present, and 30.7% were households with a female householder and no spouse or partner present. About 28.0% of all households were made up of individuals and 10.7% had someone living alone who was 65 years of age or older.

There were 381 housing units, of which 14.4% were vacant. The homeowner vacancy rate was 0.5% and the rental vacancy rate was 9.0%.

Racial composition as of the 2020 census
Race	Number	Percent
White	758	70.4%
Black or African American	252	23.4%
American Indian and Alaska Native	2	0.2%
Asian	1	0.1%
Native Hawaiian and Other Pacific Islander	0	0.0%
Some other race	20	1.9%
Two or more races	43	4.0%
Hispanic or Latino (of any race)	42	3.9%

=== 2000 census ===
As of the 2000 census, there were 1,362 people, 417 households, and 266 families residing in the CDP. The population density was 527.6 inhabitants per square mile (203.7/km^{2}). There were 480 housing units at an average density of 185.9 per square mile (71.8/km^{2}). The racial makeup of the CDP was 82.75% White, 15.71% Black, 0.22% American Indian, 0.22% Asian, 0.22% from other races, and 0.88% from two or more races. Hispanic or Latino of any race were 1.91% of the population.

There were 417 households, out of which 30.5% had children under the age of 18 living with them, 36.9% were married couples living together, 22.1% had a female householder with no husband present, and 36.2% were non-families. 28.1% of all households were made up of individuals, and 9.8% had someone living alone who was 65 years of age or older. The average household size was 2.56 and the average family size was 3.11.

In the CDP, the population was spread out, with 23.1% under the age of 18, 13.5% from 18 to 24, 36.1% from 25 to 44, 18.8% from 45 to 64, and 8.4% who were 65 years of age or older. The median age was 32 years. For every 100 females, there were 138.1 males. For every 100 females aged 18 and over, there were 141.8 males.

The median income for a household in the CDP was $15,057, and the median income for a family was $15,375. Males had a median income of $17,446 versus $11,964 for females. The per capita income for the CDP was $6,246. About 30.7% of families and 43.8% of the population were below the poverty line, including 67.6% of those under age 18 and 8.8% of those aged 65 or over.
