= Columbia County, Florida =

County in Florida, United States

- County
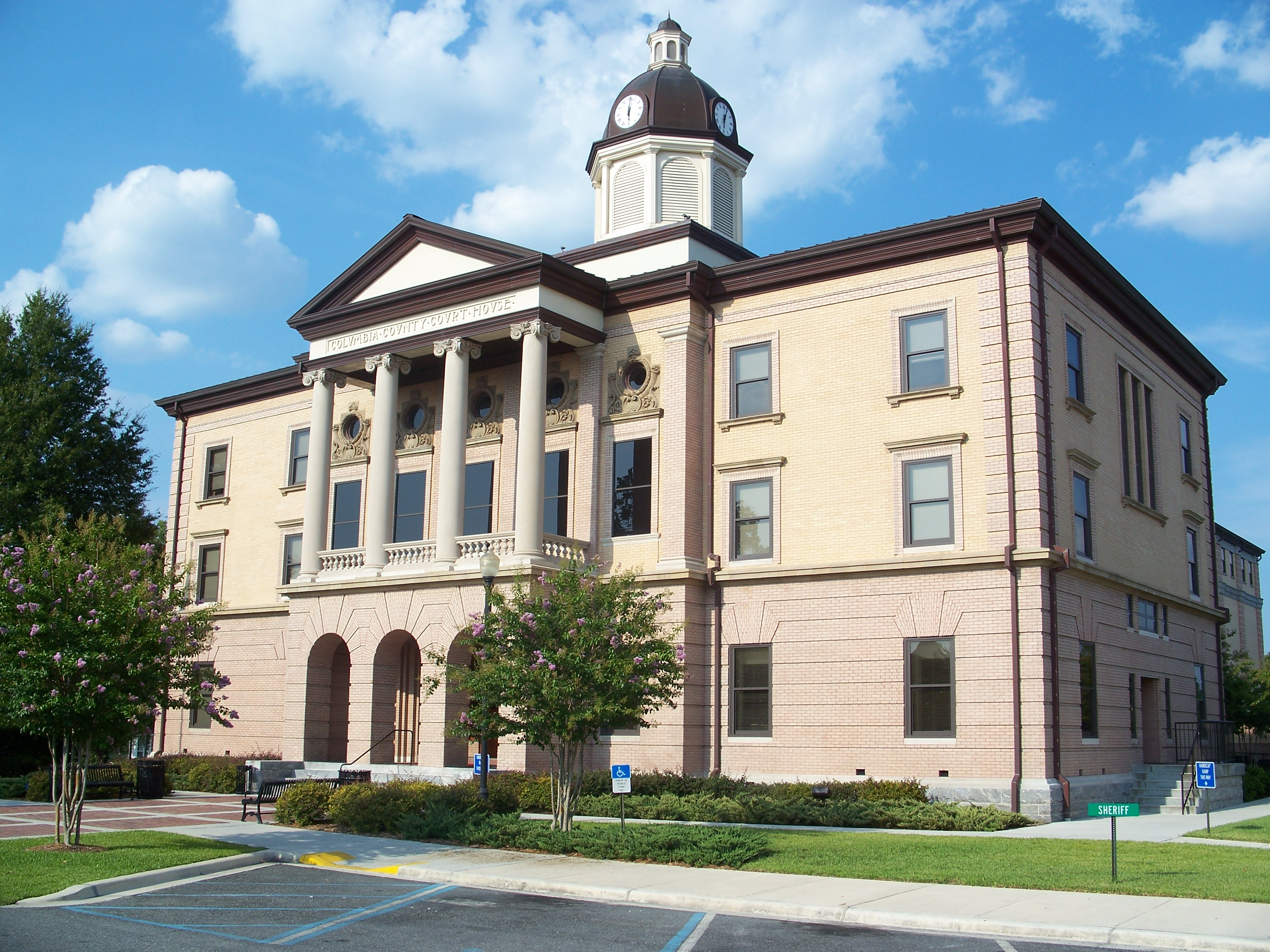
- Columbia County Courthouse in Lake City
- Logo
- Location within the U.S. state of Florida
- Coordinates: 30°14′N 82°38′W
- Country: United States
- State: Florida
- Founded: February 4, 1832
- Named for: Columbia
- Seat: Lake City
- Largest city: Lake City

Area
  - Total: 801 sq mi (2,070 km^{2})
  - Land: 798 sq mi (2,070 km^{2})
  - Water: 3.8 sq mi (9.8 km^{2}) 0.5%

Population (2020)
  - Total: 69,698
  - Estimate (2025): 74,094 ▲
  - Density: 93/sq mi (36/km^{2})
- Time zone: UTC−5 (Eastern)
  - Summer (DST): UTC−4 (EDT)
- Congressional district: 3rd
- Website: www.columbiacountyfla.com

Columbia County is a county located in the north central portion of the U.S. state of Florida. As of the 2020 census, the population was 69,698, up from 67,531 at the 2010 census. Its county seat is Lake City. Columbia County comprises the Lake City, FL Micropolitan Statistical Area, which is included in the Gainesville-Lake City, FL Combined Statistical Area. Osceola National Forest is partially in Columbia County.

== History ==
After Florida became a territory of the United States in 1821, pioneer and immigrant settlers from the United States formed their own settlement adjacent to a Seminole village called Alligator Village, and called it Alligator. Following the 1823 Treaty of Moultrie Creek, the residents of Alligator village relocated to the banks of Peace Creek in the newly established Seminole reservation, leaving Alligator Town on its own.

When Columbia County was formed in 1832 from Duval and Alachua counties, Alligator Town was designated as the seat of the county government. It was renamed as Columbia, the poetic form for the United States. The county was developed for agriculture and the timber industry, with products such as turpentine, lumber, and plywood. From 1832 to 1839, the county seat was Newnansville, but that town and area were returned to Alachua County.

In November 1858 a railroad was completed connecting Jacksonville to Alligator, which opened the town to more commerce and passenger traffic. Alligator Town was incorporated and its name changed to Lake City in 1859; M. Whit Smith was elected as the town's first mayor. According to an urban legend, the name was changed because the mayor's wife Martha Jane, who had recently moved to the town, refused to hang her lace curtains in a town named Alligator.

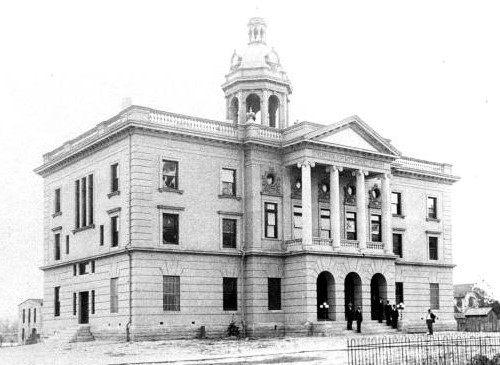
Columbia County Courthouse around 1902.

During the American Civil War, the railroad between Lake City and Jacksonville was used to send beef and salt to Confederate soldiers. In February 1864 Union troops under Truman Seymour advanced west from Jacksonville. His objective was to disrupt Confederate supplies, and obtain African-American recruits and supplies. Confederate General Joseph Finnegan assembled troops and called for reinforcements from P. G. T. Beauregard in response to the Union threat. On February 11, 1864, Finnegan's troops defeated a Union cavalry raid in Lake City. After the Union cavalry was repulsed, Finnegan moved his forces to Olustee Station about ten miles east of Lake City (in Baker County). The Confederate presence at Olustee Station was reinforced to prepare for the Union troops coming from Jacksonville.

Union forces engaged the Confederates at the Battle of Olustee on February 20, 1864, near the Olustee Station. It was the only major battle in Florida during the war. Union casualties were 1,861 men killed, wounded or missing; Confederate casualties were 946 killed, wounded or missing. The Confederate dead were buried in Lake City. In 1928 a memorial for the Battle of Olustee was established in downtown Lake City.

Lake City's first newspaper was published in 1874, called the Lake City Reporter. Charles H. Thompson, an African American minister, represented Columbia County in the Florida House of Representatives and served as a county commissioner in 1874 and 1875. In 1876 the Bigelow Building was completed; it later was adapted for use as the City Hall. The first fire department was established in 1883 to complement the police department. In 1891 Lake City became the first city in Florida to have electric lights from a local power and light company.

White violence rose against blacks in the late 19th century in a regionwide effort to establish and maintain white supremacy as Southern states disenfranchised most blacks and imposed Jim Crow. Whites lynched 20 African Americans in Columbia County from 1877 to 1950, mostly in the decades near the turn of the 20th century. It was tied with Polk County for the second-highest total of lynchings of any county in the state.

Among these murders was the mass lynching on May 21, 1911, of six black men who were taken from the jail by a white mob in Lake City. They were being held on charges of murdering one white sawmill worker and wounding another in Leon County, after whites had attacked them at a private house following an earlier altercation between two men. A group of a dozen white men, reportedly from Tallahassee, tricked the white youth guarding the jail by posing as officials and gained release of the suspects. They took the men outside town and shot them repeatedly to death.

== Geography ==
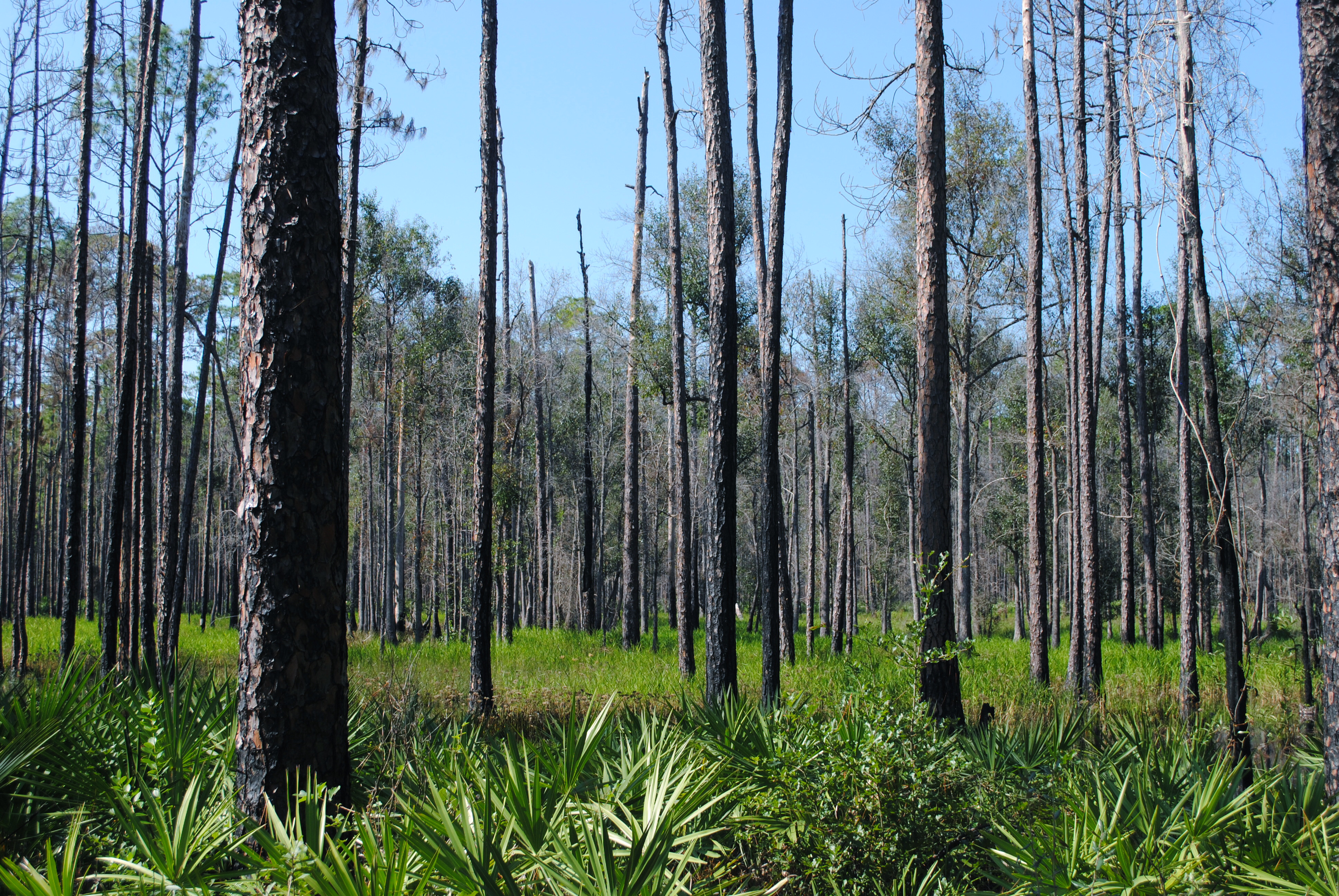
Osceola National Forest

According to the U.S. Census Bureau, the county has a total area of 801 square miles (2,070 km^{2}), of which 798 square miles (2,070 km^{2}) is land and 3.8 square miles (9.8 km^{2}) (0.5%) is water. Osceola National Forest is partially within the county.

Columbia County is coterminous with the Lake City, Florida Micropolitan Statistical Area (μSA). The μSA was first defined by the U.S. Office of Management and Budget in 2003. It was added to the Gainesville-Lake City, Florida Combined Statistical Area in 2020.

=== Adjacent counties ===
- Echols County, Georgia - north
- Clinch County, Georgia - northeast
- Baker County - east
- Union County - southeast
- Alachua County - south
- Gilchrist County - southwest
- Suwannee County - west
- Hamilton County - northwest

=== National protected area ===
- Osceola National Forest (part)

== Demographics ==
Historical population
Census	Pop.	Note	%±
1840	2,102		—
1850	4,808		128.7%
1860	4,646		−3.4%
1870	7,335		57.9%
1880	9,589		30.7%
1890	12,877		34.3%
1900	17,094		32.7%
1910	17,689		3.5%
1920	14,290		−19.2%
1930	14,638		2.4%
1940	16,859		15.2%
1950	18,216		8.0%
1960	20,077		10.2%
1970	25,250		25.8%
1980	35,399		40.2%
1990	42,613		20.4%
2000	56,513		32.6%
2010	67,531		19.5%
2020	69,698		3.2%
2025 (est.)	74,094	▲	6.3%
U.S. Decennial Census; 1790-1960 1900-1990; 1990-2000 2010-2015 2020 2024

=== Racial and ethnic composition ===
Columbia County, Florida – Racial and ethnic composition Note: the US Census treats Hispanic/Latino as an ethnic category. This table excludes Latinos from the racial categories and assigns them to a separate category. Hispanics/Latinos may be of any race.
Race / Ethnicity (NH = Non-Hispanic)	Pop 1980	Pop 1990	Pop 2000	Pop 2010	Pop 2020	% 1980	% 1990	% 2000	% 2010	% 2020
White alone (NH)	28,062	33,978	44,058	50,475	49,096	79.27%	79.74%	77.96%	74.74%	70.44%
Black or African American alone (NH)	6,762	7,644	9,522	11,663	11,441	19.10%	17.94%	16.85%	17.27%	16.42%
Native American or Alaska Native alone (NH)	46	100	268	316	236	0.13%	0.23%	0.47%	0.47%	0.34%
Asian alone (NH)	136	260	372	611	867	0.38%	0.61%	0.66%	0.90%	1.24%
Native Hawaiian or Pacific Islander alone (NH)	x	x	20	36	27	x	x	0.04%	0.05%	0.04%
Other race alone (NH)	26	12	36	94	295	0.07%	0.03%	0.06%	0.14%	0.42%
Mixed race or Multiracial (NH)	x	x	691	1,060	2,673	x	x	1.22%	1.57%	3.84%
Hispanic or Latino (any race)	367	619	1,546	3,276	5,063	1.04%	1.45%	2.74%	4.85%	7.26%
Total	35,399	42,613	56,513	67,531	69,698	100.00%	100.00%	100.00%	100.00%	100.00%

A map of the racial demographics in Columbia County by Census tract Legend: Non-Hispanic White 40–50% 50–60% 60–70% 70–80% 80–90%

=== 2020 census ===
As of the 2020 census, there were 69,698 people, 26,424 households, and 15,740 families residing in the county. The median age was 42.9 years; 21.4% of residents were under the age of 18 and 20.6% were 65 years of age or older.

For every 100 females there were 104.4 males, and for every 100 females age 18 and over there were 104.9 males age 18 and over.

The racial makeup of the county was 72.8% White, 16.6% Black or African American, 0.4% American Indian and Alaska Native, 1.3% Asian, 0.1% Native Hawaiian and Pacific Islander, 2.2% from some other race, and 6.7% from two or more races. Hispanic or Latino residents of any race comprised 7.3% of the population.

36.3% of residents lived in urban areas, while 63.7% lived in rural areas.

Of the 26,424 households, 29.3% had children under the age of 18 living in them. Of all households, 44.7% were married-couple households, 19.6% were households with a male householder and no spouse or partner present, and 28.1% were households with a female householder and no spouse or partner present. About 27.3% of all households were made up of individuals and 13.0% had someone living alone who was 65 years of age or older.

There were 29,775 housing units, of which 11.3% were vacant. Among occupied housing units, 71.5% were owner-occupied and 28.5% were renter-occupied. The homeowner vacancy rate was 1.8% and the rental vacancy rate was 8.1%.

=== 2000 census ===
As of the census of 2000, there were 56,513 people, 20,925 households, and 14,919 families residing in the county. The population density was 71 people per square mile (27 people/km^{2}). There were 23,579 housing units at an average density of 30 per square mile (12/km^{2}). The racial makeup of the county was 79.72% White, 17.03% Black or African American, 0.53% Native American, 0.67% Asian, 0.04% Pacific Islander, 0.60% from other races, and 1.42% from two or more races. 2.74% of the population were Hispanic or Latino of any race.

There were 20,925 households, out of which 32.10% had children under the age of 18 living with them, 53.70% were married couples living together, 12.90% had a female householder with no husband present, and 28.70% were non-families. 23.80% of all households were made up of individuals, and 9.80% had someone living alone who was 65 years of age or older. The average household size was 2.56 and the average family size was 3.02.

In the county, the population was spread out, with 25.40% under the age of 18, 9.00% from 18 to 24, 27.70% from 25 to 44, 24.00% from 45 to 64, and 14.00% who were 65 years of age or older. The median age was 37 years. For every 100 females there were 102.90 males. For every 100 females age 18 and over, there were 101.70 males.

The median income for a household in the county was $30,881, and the median income for a family was $35,927. Males had a median income of $27,353 versus $21,738 for females. The per capita income for the county was $14,598. About 11.40% of families and 15.00% of the population were below the poverty line, including 17.10% of those under age 18 and 13.60% of those age 65 or over.

== Economy ==
The largest sector of Columbia County’s economy is government (city, county, state & federal) and public administration contributing $512 million and 3,200 jobs. The next largest sector is manufacturing with $430 million. Healthcare and social services come third but provide the most jobs, 4,700. Retail trade is fourth with 3,900 jobs and $300 million in sales. In fifth place is Logistics and transportation. The county is positioned at the intersection of Interstates 10 and 75 and became a hub for warehousing, distribution centers and trucking. Convenient access to Port Tampa Bay and Jaxport. The last major sector is agriculture and forestry with: farming & ranching, crops & timber.

== Politics ==
=== Voter registration ===
According to the Secretary of State's office, Republicans are the majority of registered voters in Columbia County.

Columbia County Voter Registration & Party Enrollment as of September 30, 2022
Political Party	Total Voters	Percentage
Republican	22,477	52.05%
Democratic	12,176	28.20%
Independent	7,921	18.34%
Third Parties	608	1.41%
Total	43,182	100%

=== Statewide elections ===
United States presidential election results for Columbia County, Florida
Year	Republican		Democratic		Third party(ies)	
Year	No.	%	No.	%	No.	%
1904	317	32.09%	595	60.22%	76	7.69%
1908	279	31.28%	465	52.13%	148	16.59%
1912	66	9.85%	520	77.61%	84	12.54%
1916	226	19.06%	861	72.60%	99	8.35%
1920	162	10.50%	1,248	80.88%	133	8.62%
1924	85	8.94%	776	81.60%	90	9.46%
1928	418	24.36%	1,276	74.36%	22	1.28%
1932	174	6.51%	2,497	93.49%	0	0.00%
1936	196	6.58%	2,783	93.42%	0	0.00%
1940	443	13.30%	2,888	86.70%	0	0.00%
1944	537	17.88%	2,467	82.12%	0	0.00%
1948	553	16.60%	1,797	53.93%	982	29.47%
1952	2,041	38.73%	3,229	61.27%	0	0.00%
1956	1,841	36.19%	3,246	63.81%	0	0.00%
1960	2,094	36.17%	3,695	63.83%	0	0.00%
1964	4,145	56.06%	3,249	43.94%	0	0.00%
1968	1,553	21.13%	1,750	23.81%	4,046	55.06%
1972	6,723	80.16%	1,664	19.84%	0	0.00%
1976	3,947	36.66%	6,683	62.08%	136	1.26%
1980	5,643	48.45%	5,680	48.76%	325	2.79%
1984	8,814	67.41%	4,261	32.59%	0	0.00%
1988	7,761	65.13%	4,073	34.18%	82	0.69%
1992	6,492	43.41%	5,528	36.97%	2,934	19.62%
1996	7,588	46.48%	6,691	40.98%	2,047	12.54%
2000	10,968	59.24%	7,049	38.07%	497	2.68%
2004	16,758	67.06%	8,031	32.14%	202	0.81%
2008	18,670	66.17%	9,171	32.50%	374	1.33%
2012	18,429	67.69%	8,462	31.08%	336	1.23%
2016	20,368	70.57%	7,601	26.33%	895	3.10%
2020	23,836	72.03%	8,914	26.94%	342	1.03%
2024	25,108	74.53%	8,250	24.49%	332	0.99%

United States Senate election results for Columbia County, Florida1
Year	Republican		Democratic		Third party(ies)	
Year	No.	%	No.	%	No.	%
2024	24,400	73.45%	8,283	24.93%	536	1.61%

United States Senate election results for Columbia County, Florida3
Year	Republican		Democratic		Third party(ies)	
Year	No.	%	No.	%	No.	%
2022	18,344	77.55%	5,070	21.43%	241	1.02%

Florida Gubernatorial election results for Columbia County
Year	Republican		Democratic		Third party(ies)	
Year	No.	%	No.	%	No.	%
1994	7,408	58.35%	5,288	41.65%	0	0.00%
1998	7,698	61.27%	4,863	38.71%	3	0.02%
2002	9,554	58.50%	6,603	40.43%	174	1.07%
2006	9,313	59.74%	5,763	36.97%	514	3.30%
2010	11,089	58.66%	7,068	37.39%	748	3.96%
2014	11,604	63.15%	5,812	31.63%	958	5.21%
2018	17,426	70.14%	7,105	28.60%	312	1.26%
2022	18,790	79.19%	4,789	20.18%	148	0.62%

== Education ==
The Columbia County School District, the only school district in the county, operates its public schools.

=== Library ===
The Columbia County Public Library consists of 3 branches.

- Main Branch
- West Branch
- Fort White Branch

== Transportation ==
=== Airports ===
Columbia County's main airport is Lake City Municipal Airport. Private airstrips also exist throughout the county.

=== Major roads ===
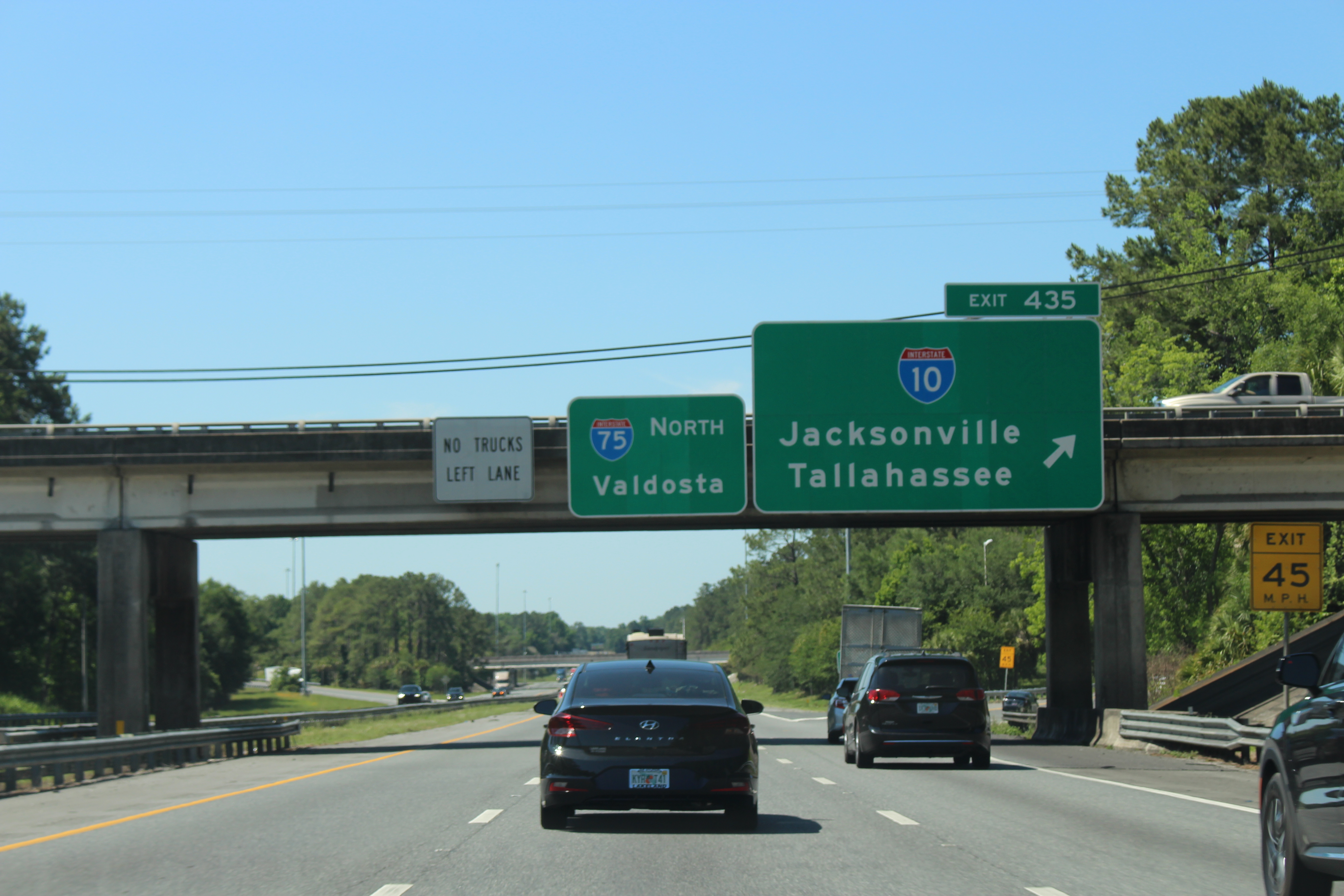
Driving north on Interstate 75 in Columbia County approaching Interstate 10.

- I-10 (Interstate 10) is the main west-to-east interstate highway in the county, and serves as the unofficial dividing line between northern and southern Columbia County. It contains three interchanges within the county; the first being I-75 in Springville (Exits 296 A-B), and the other two in Five Points, north of Lake City, US 41 (Exit 301), and US 441(Exit 303). Beyond this point I-10 runs through Osceola National Forest.
- I-75 (Interstate 75) is the southeast-to-northwest interstate highway in the county, which enters from Alachua County at bridges over the Santa Fe River. It has four interchanges in the county with US 41/441 in Ellisville (Exit 414), SR 47 (Exit 423), US 90 in Lake City (Exit 427) and I-10 in Springville (Exits 435 A-B).
- US 27 is another southeast-to-northwest road in southwestern Columbia County, that enters from a bridge over the Santa Fe River, runs through Fort White, and leaves at another bridge over the Ichetucknee River at Ichetucknee Springs State Park.
- US 41 runs north from High Springs in a concurrency with US 441 until just before it reaches Lake City, Then the two routes run parallel to each other until US 41 branches off to the northwest on its way to Hamilton County, Valdosta, Georgia, and points north.
- US 90 was the main west-to-east highway in the county, until it was surpassed by I-10. It enters the county from Wellborn in Suwannee County, and directly enters Lake City. East of the city, it runs along the southern edge of Osceola National Forest and serves as the address of two major prisons before crossing the Baker County Line and entering a portion of the forest itself.
- US 441 runs north from High Springs in a concurrency with US 41 until just before it reaches Lake City, Then the two routes run parallel to each other, but unlike US 41, US 441 stays in Columbia County and runs straight north and south until it crosses the Georgia State Line.
- SR 2 is located on the far northeast corner of the county, and has no significant intersections in the county.
- SR 47 is a northeast-to-southwest road that spans from Trenton in Gilchrist County to US 41 in Lake City. North of there it becomes a hidden state road along US 41 until it reaches US Truck Route 90, then turns east, only to turn north again onto US 441 where it remains for the duration until it crosses the Florida-Georgia State Line.
- SR 100 runs northwest to southeast from Hamilton County in an overlap with southbound US 41, until it reaches US 90 in Lake City, where it runs east in an overlap with that route before branching off on its own in Watertown, then runs southeast towards the Union County Line.
- SR 238 runs west to east in Ellisville and only exists for one and a half miles in the county, but still serves as an important route to Lake Butler in Union County.
- SR 247 is a northeast to southwest road that spans from Branford in Suwannee County, and terminates at US 90 in western Lake City, just east of US 90's interchange with I-75.

=== Railroads ===
Columbia County has at least three existing railroad lines. The primary one is a Florida Gulf & Atlantic Railroad line formerly owned by CSX, Seaboard System Railroad, Seaboard Coastline Industries and Seaboard Air Line Railroad that served Amtrak's Sunset Limited until it was truncated to New Orleans in 2005 by Hurricane Katrina. Lake City (Amtrak station) was Columbia County's only active railroad station until that point. Until 1971, Lake City was a stop on the Louisville and Nashville and Seaboard Coast Line's Gulf Wind (New Orleans - Jacksonville). The Seaboard Air Line operated this and another passenger train in each direction through Lake City until 1966 or 1967. Another one is owned by Norfolk Southern Railway's Navair District (originally the Georgia Southern and Florida Railway), and runs along US 41 from Lake City through Hamilton County. A third line runs along SR 100 into Union County.

== Communities ==
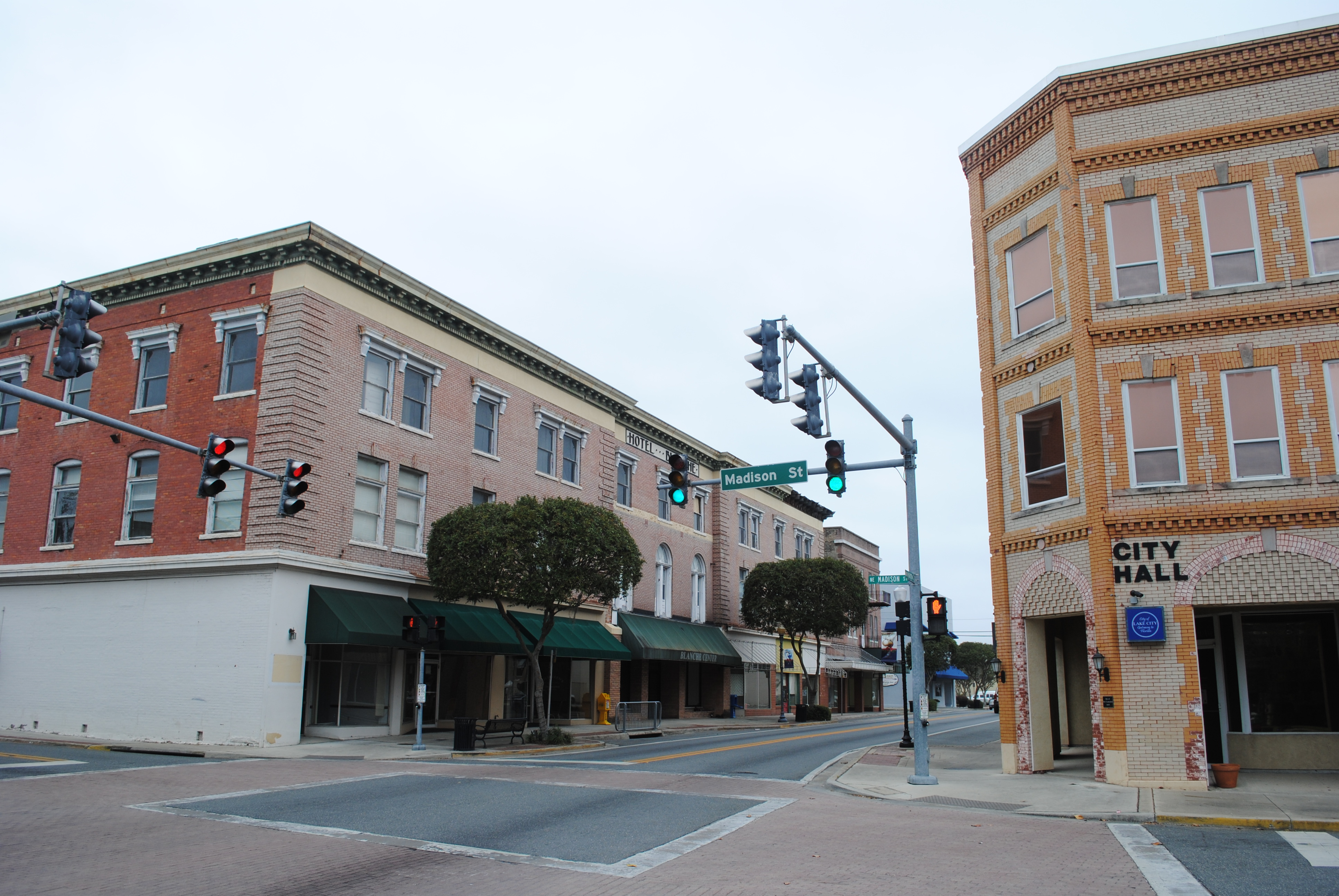
Lake City

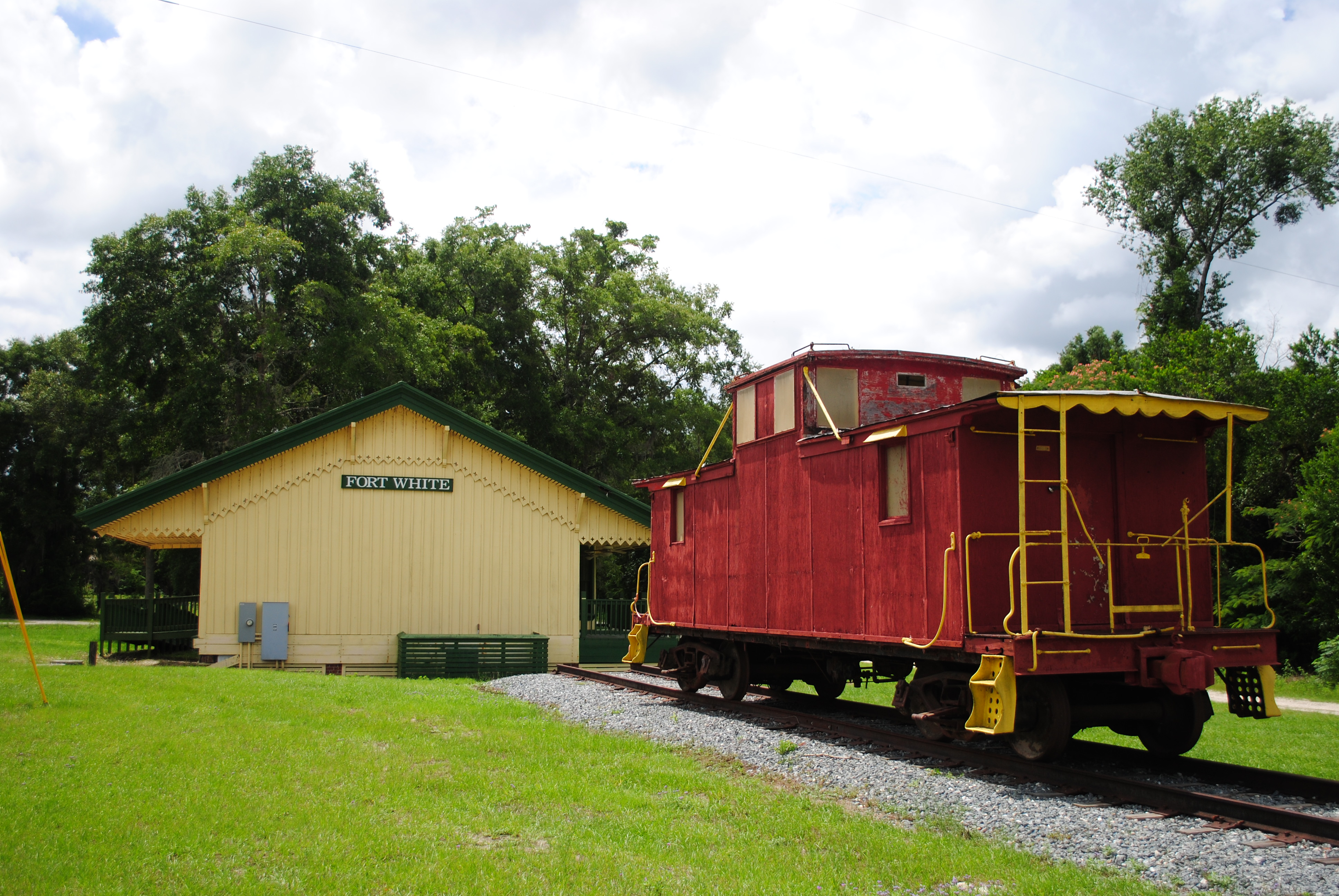
Fort White

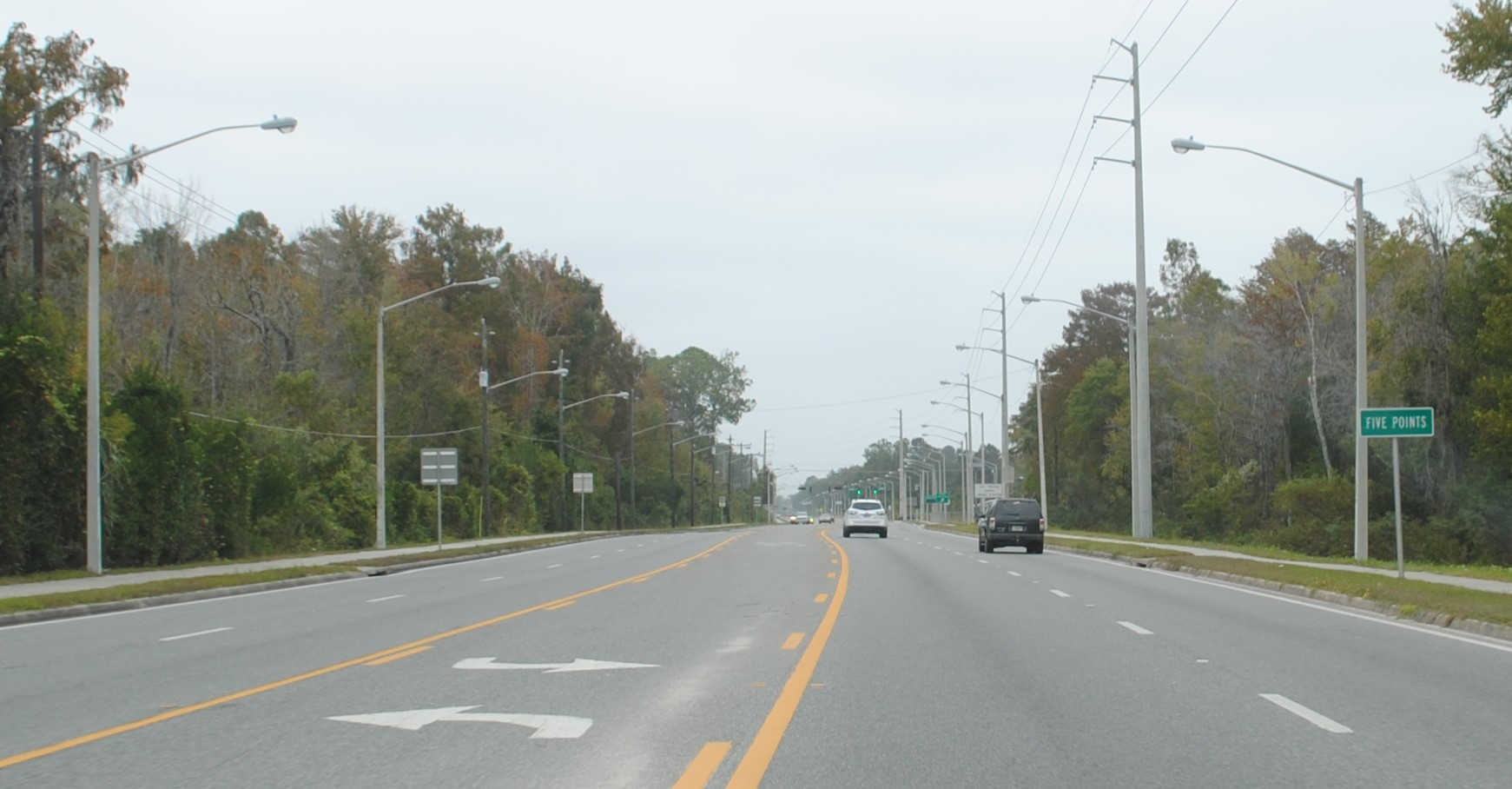
Five Points

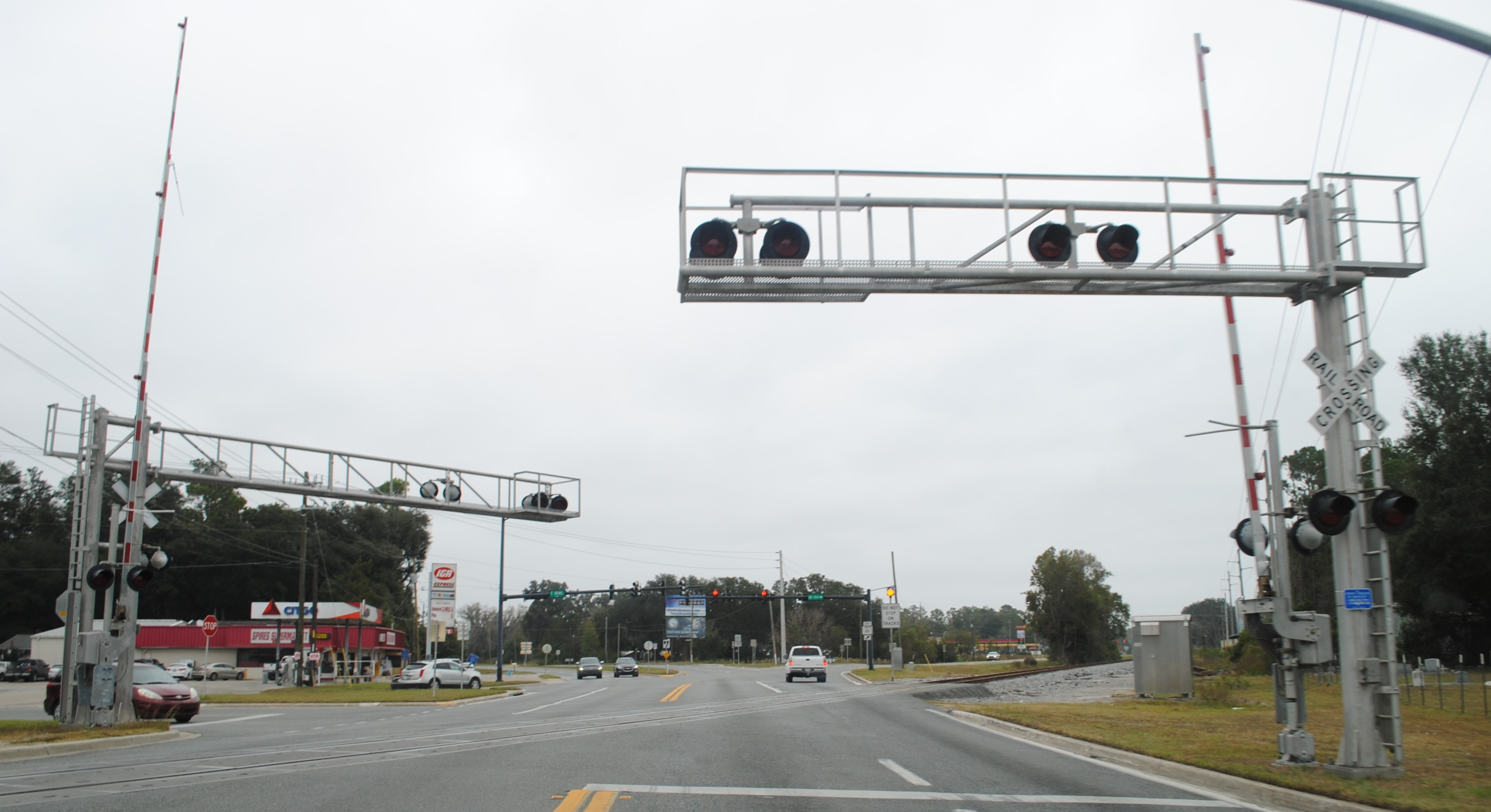
Watertown

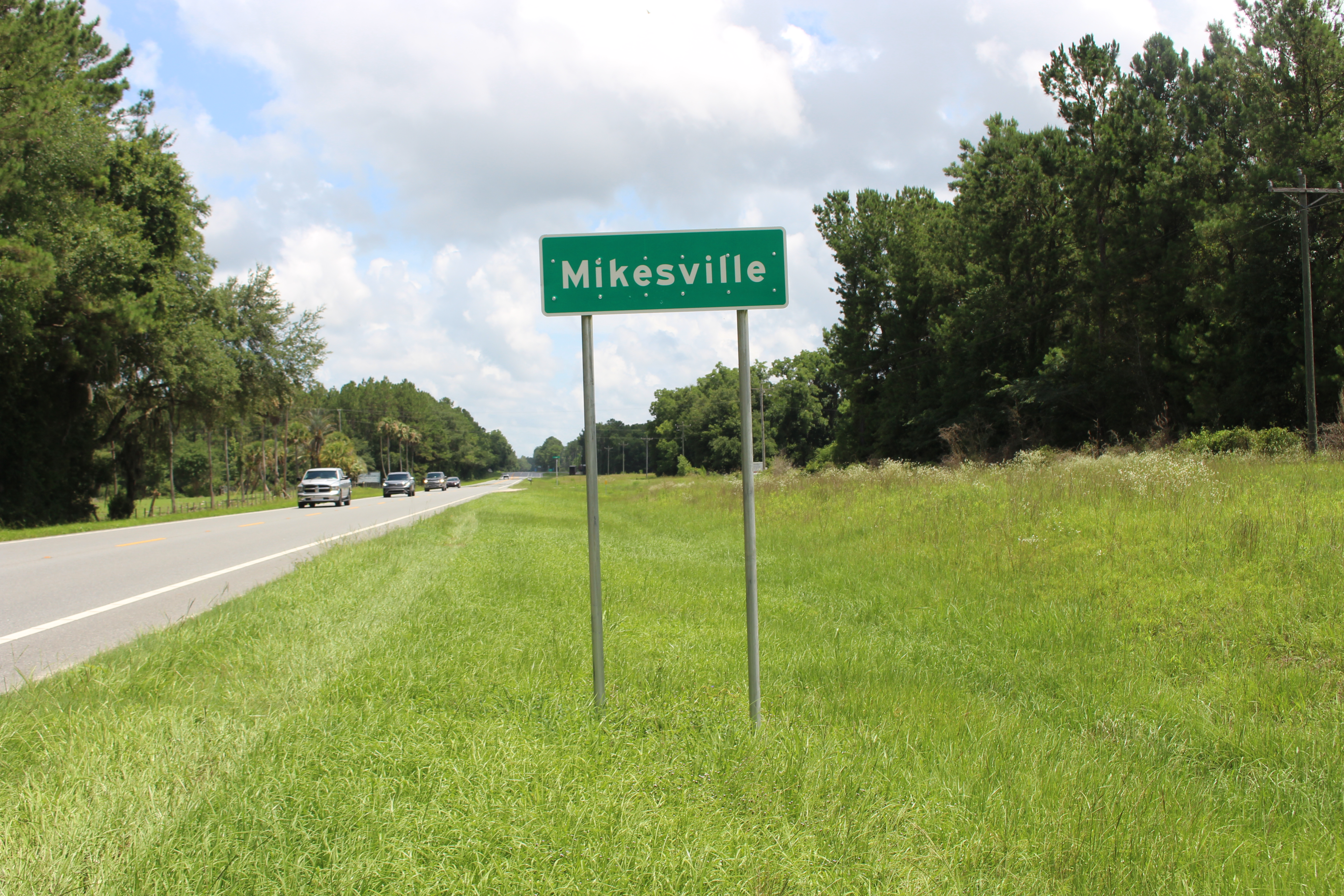
Mikesville

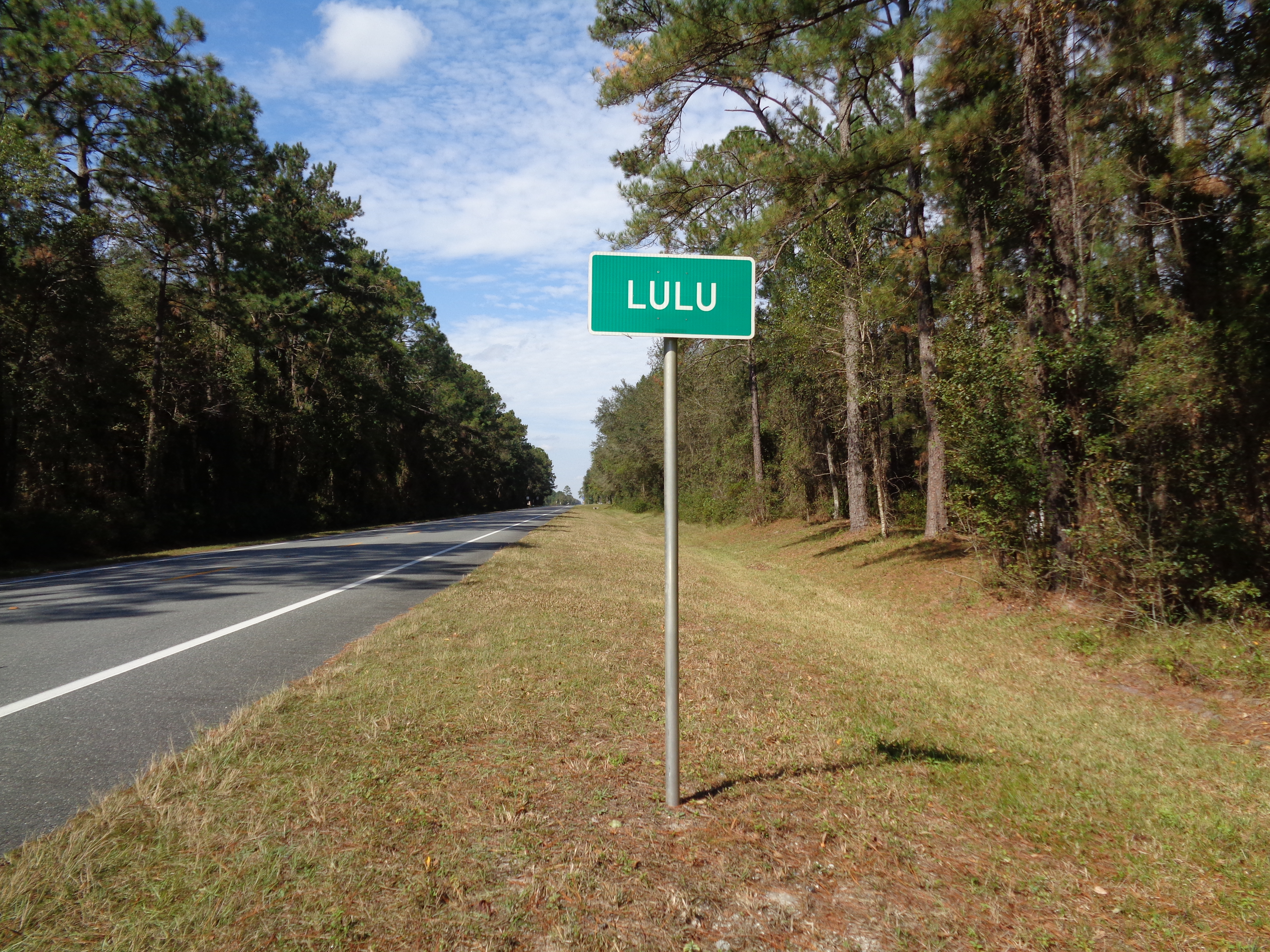
Lulu

=== City ===
- Lake City

=== Town ===
- Fort White

=== Census-designated places ===
- Five Points
- Watertown

=== Other unincorporated communities ===
- Columbia City
- Ellisville
- Lulu
- Mikesville
- Newco
- Suwannee Valley
- Winfield

== See also ==
- National Register of Historic Places listings in Columbia County, Florida
