= U.S. Route 441 in Florida =

Highway in Florida

U.S. Highway 441

Route information
- Auxiliary route of US 41
- Maintained by FDOT
- Length: 433.050 mi (696.926 km)

Major junctions
- South end: US 41 in Miami
- I-95 in North Miami Beach; Florida's Turnpike / SR 826 in Golden Glades; I-595 in Broadview Park; SR 70 in Okeechobee; I-4 in Orlando; SR 50 in Orlando; SR 40 in Ocala; SR 24 in Gainesville; I-75 in Alachua; I-10 in Lake City
- North end: US 441 / SR 89 south of Fargo, GA

Location
- Country: United States
- State: Florida
- Counties: Miami-Dade, Broward, Palm Beach, Martin, Okeechobee, Osceola, Orange, Seminole, Lake, Sumter, Marion, Alachua, Columbia

Highway system
- United States Numbered Highway System; List; Special; Divided; Florida State Highway System; Interstate; US; State; Former; Pre‑1945; Toll; Scenic
← SR 438	→ SR 441

U.S. Route 441 (US 441) in Florida is a north–south United States Highway. It runs 433 miles (697 km) from Miami in South Florida northwest to the Georgia state line, with the overall route continuing to Tennessee in the Rocky Top area.

Like all AASHTO designated highways in Florida, US 441 always carries a FDOT designated hidden state road number:

- State Road 7 (SR 7) from the US route's southern terminus at US 41/SR 90 in Miami to Southern Boulevard (US 98/SR 80) in Royal Palm Beach.
- State Road 80 from SR 7 in Royal Palm Beach to Main Street (SR 15) in Belle Glade.
- State Road 15 from Hooker Highway (SR 812/SR 80) in Belle Glade to Narcoosee Road (County Road 15 or CR 15) in St. Cloud.
- State Road 500 from the intersection with Irlo Bronson Memorial Highway (US 192) in Holopaw to Bonnie Heath Boulevard (US 27/SR 492) in Ocala.
- State Road 25 from North 14th Street (US 27) in Leesburg to the junction with US 41/US 441 Truck in Columbia County, with the following exception:
  - State Road 25A between the junctions of CR 25 north in Lady Lake and SR 25 south in Belleview.
- State Road 25A from US 41/US 441 Truck to CR 25A north in Five Points.
- State Road 47 from Duval Street (US 90/SR 10) in Lake City to Georgia State Route 89 at the Georgia state line.

Concurrences with U.S. routes include US 98 from Royal Palm Beach to Okeechobee, within the vicinity of Lake Okeechobee, US 192 between Holopaw and Kissimmee, US 17-92 from Kissimmee to Orlando, SR 44 from Mount Dora to Leesburg, US 27 from Leesburg to Ocala, US 301 from Belleview to near Sparr, and US 41 from High Springs to Lake City.

== Route description ==
=== Miami to Kissimmee ===
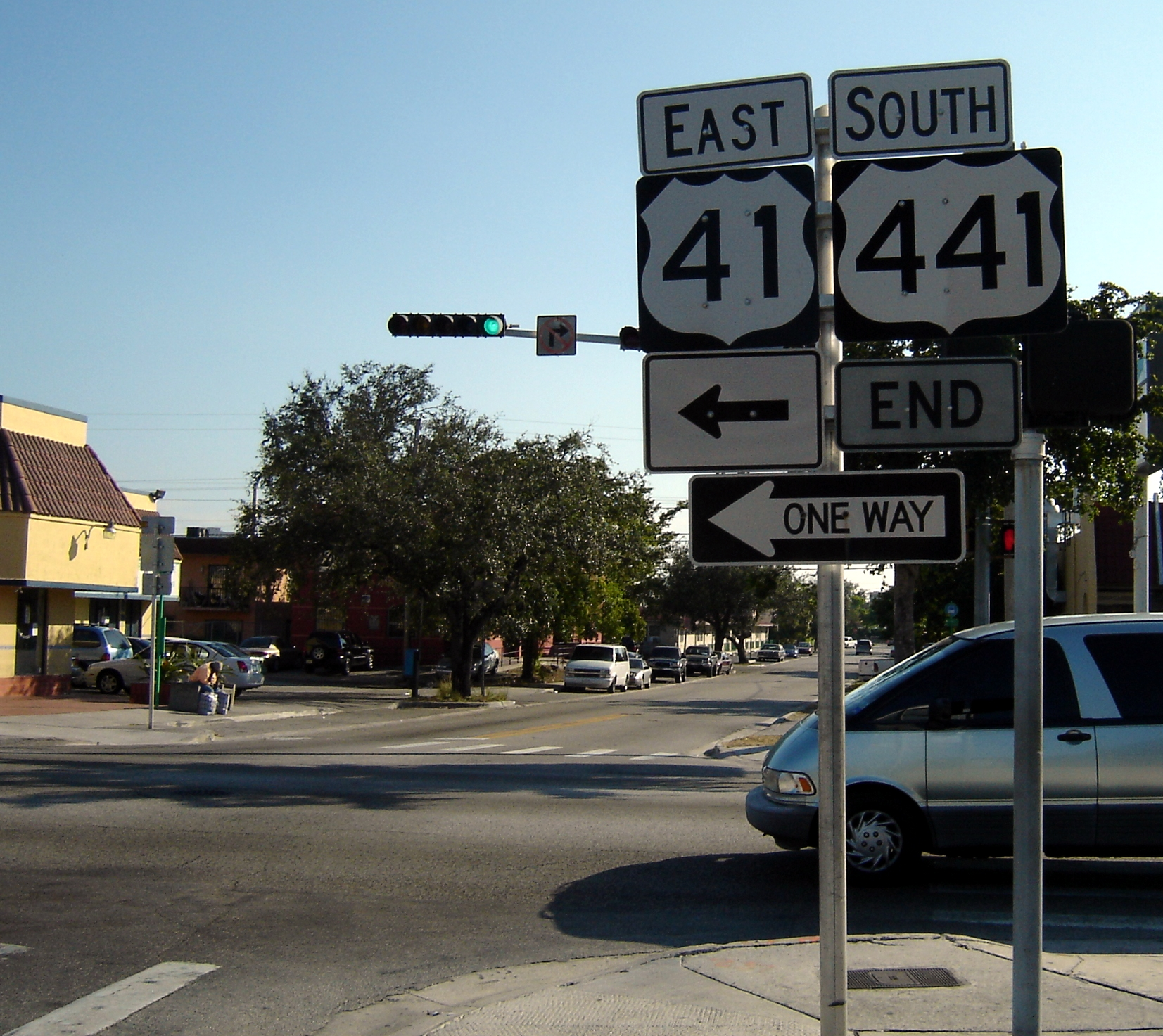
The southern terminus of US 441 in Miami

US 441 begins its northward journey at Southwest 7th and 8th Streets (US 41 both directions) in the east section of the "Little Havana" neighborhood of downtown Miami (both are one-way streets). 441 runs along SW/NW 8th Ave. till it crosses the Miami River; then it runs along NW 7th Ave. till the Golden Glades interchange; then it runs along NW 2nd Ave. till the Miami-Dade/Broward county line. The route is concurrent with SR 7 from its southern terminus and parallels Interstate 95 (I-95) north out of Miami to western Aventura, where I-95 heads northeast to access Fort Lauderdale and the remainder of the eastern Florida coast. However, the route is soon joined by the tolled Florida's Turnpike and I-95 (Exits 12 and 12C), which follows US 441 north to Royal Palm Beach (ten miles west of West Palm Beach). In between, the route interchanges with the Turnpike at exit 62 via State Road 870 (Commercial Blvd.) in Tamarac. Additionally, US 441 meets Interstate 595 (Exits 8 and 8B) west of Fort Lauderdale and the tolled State Road 869 in Coconut Creek.

At Royal Palm Beach, US 441 intersects U.S. Route 98, ending the concurrency with SR 7, and overlaps the highway through central Palm Beach County, along with hidden State Road 80. Near Twenty Mile Bend SR 700 branches off to the northwest, which is where U.S. Routes 98 and 441 split until 2007. US 98-441 continues west to Belle Glade at the intersection of State Road 15, along the eastern shore of Lake Okeechobee, where SR 80 turns south and US 98-441 turns north to follow the shoreline to Pahokee. Just north of Pahokee in Canal Point, SR 700 rejoins US 98-441 and remains concurrent with US 441 along the eastern edge of the lake. North of Lake Okeechobee in Okeechobee, US 98 splits away from US 441 making a left turn at State Road 70, shortly afterwards the Okeechobee Amtrak station can be found. US 441 continues north, meeting the Turnpike at Yeehaw Junction in Osceola County (via State Road 60). It passes through the community of Kenansville prior to intersecting U.S. Route 192 at Holopaw. US 441 turns west onto US 192, forming an overlap into Kissimmee.

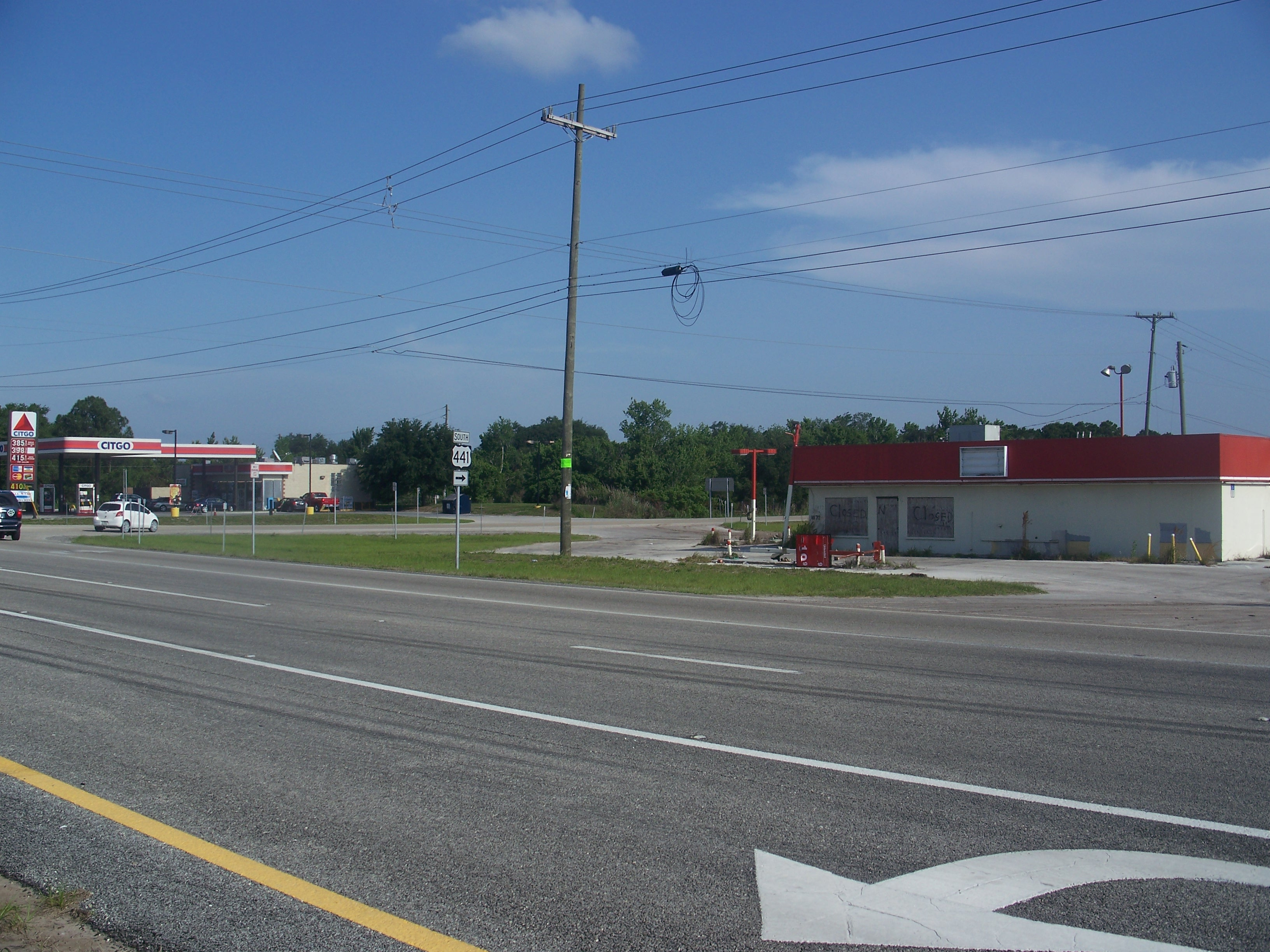
U.S. 441/U.S. 192 intersection in Holopaw

=== Kissimmee to Mount Dora ===
At Kissimmee, US 441 separates from US 192 and joins US 17/92, here known as the Orange Blossom Trail or OBT. The OBT starts on US 17/92 at the Polk County/Osceola County line a few miles south of Kissimmee. These names are used throughout Central Florida for the length of US 441 within the region.

Due to its proximity with Walt Disney World and affiliated resorts, as well as Sea World, Universal Studios, and others, US 17/US 92/US 441 intersects many toll roads between Kissimmee and Orlando, the first of which is the partially tolled and partial limited-access Osceola Parkway in Kissimmee. Immediately after entering Orange County, it intersects SR 417 (Central Florida GreeneWay) at exit 11. Just north of the intersection the Central Florida Parkway leads to Sea World. Neither of these intersections or interchanges, however, compares to the combined interchanges of Florida's Turnpike and SR 528 (Beachline Expressway), in Sky Lake, which contains a series of convoluted interchanges and partial ramps from side roads. North of this interchange, the road passes west of The Florida Mall and intersects SR 482.

In Holden Heights, US 441 has an interchange with I-4 (Exit 80). Eastbound access from I-4 comes from partial cloverleaf ramps, and westbound access comes from a left-turn ramp between the two carriageways that runs under the eastbound lane and merges with the east to southbound ramp before merging with southbound OBT. The interchange provides no south to east access and no west to north access, but such access can found from the intersection with West Michigan Street. Further north the road heads into Orlando and comes to the interchange with SR 408 (East-West Tollway) at exit 9, which is a diamond interchange. After curving around Givens Street and Springdale Road, both of which can only be accessed from West Concord Street, OBT moves closer to a parallel railroad freight line and meets the intersection of SR 50 (Colonial Drive) northwest of downtown. Here, US 17/92 turns east onto State Road 50 while US 441 continues north on the Orange Blossom Trail. North of downtown, US 441 encounters intersections with State Road 438, then State Road 416, and after running along the western edge of Lake Fairview, an intersection with State Road 423 which changes from the north-and-south John Young Parkway to the east-and-west Lee Road.

The road moves away from the freight line north of SR 423, but in Lockhart, it runs over a bridge for that line again between Rose Avenue and Beggs Road. Further northwest, it runs beneath an interchange with State Road 414, then cuts through a corner of Seminole County and re-enters Orange County in Apopka where it meets the northern terminus of West Orange Trail and the tolled State Road 429 before leaving the Orlando area. This road was intended to be part of the Central Florida GreeneWay loop around the Orlando metropolitan area. The road cuts through Plymouth and back to Apopka again, but the last sites in Apopka are Orlando Apopka Airport along the west side and Zellwood Cemetery on the east side before entering Zellwood, Florida. Intersections here include Ponkan Road and then Jones Avenue, which lead to another airport known as Bob White Field The road takes a slight reverse curve before the intersection with Sadler Avenue (CR 448), and then approaches Lake Ola in Tangerine, where the road turns straight north. At the junction with County Road Old 441 (former State Road 500A), US 441 finally loses its designation as the Orange Blossom Trail, then crosses the Orange-Lake County Line and enters Mount Dora. CR Old 441 remains a local downtown street in Mount Dora, but US 441 continues as a rural at-grade four-lane divided highway.

=== Mount Dora to Sparr ===
Continuing with the rural surroundings, US 441 maintains its straight north–south position until it curves to the northwest between Lincoln and East Pine Avenues. Approaching Loch Leven, it turns straight west, and then State Road 44 joins US 441 after having run west from New Smyrna Beach and DeLand. This intersection is also shared with County Road 44B, which takes motorists to downtown Mount Dora. In southern Eustis, US 441-SR 44 encounters another unnumbered interchange with State Road 19 and County Road 19A, taking SR 19 in a wrong-way concurrency until it reaches a Y in Tavares, where SR 19 heads south toward Howey-in-the-Hills and Groveland, and County Road Old 441 rejoins US 441. From here, US 441-SR 44 is a six-lane highway with bicycle lanes that squeezes between Lake Harris and Lake Eustis where it crosses over the Dead River on a bridge between the two lakes. The road passes by Leesburg Municipal Airport, then serves as the western terminus of the overlap with County Road 44, all the while winding around the northern shores of Lake Harris. In Leesburg, SR 44 leaves US 441 heading toward Wildwood, Inverness, and Crystal River, while US 441 curves to the northwest, then intersects U.S. Route 27 in another concurrency, and as a result, the hidden state routes are officially SR 25-500. The concurrency with SR 25 is short-lived, because in Lady Lake, SR 25 branches away as County Road 25. This once served as the southern terminus of the US 27-441 Alternate Route around Lake Weir into Belleview, but still remains a scenic route.

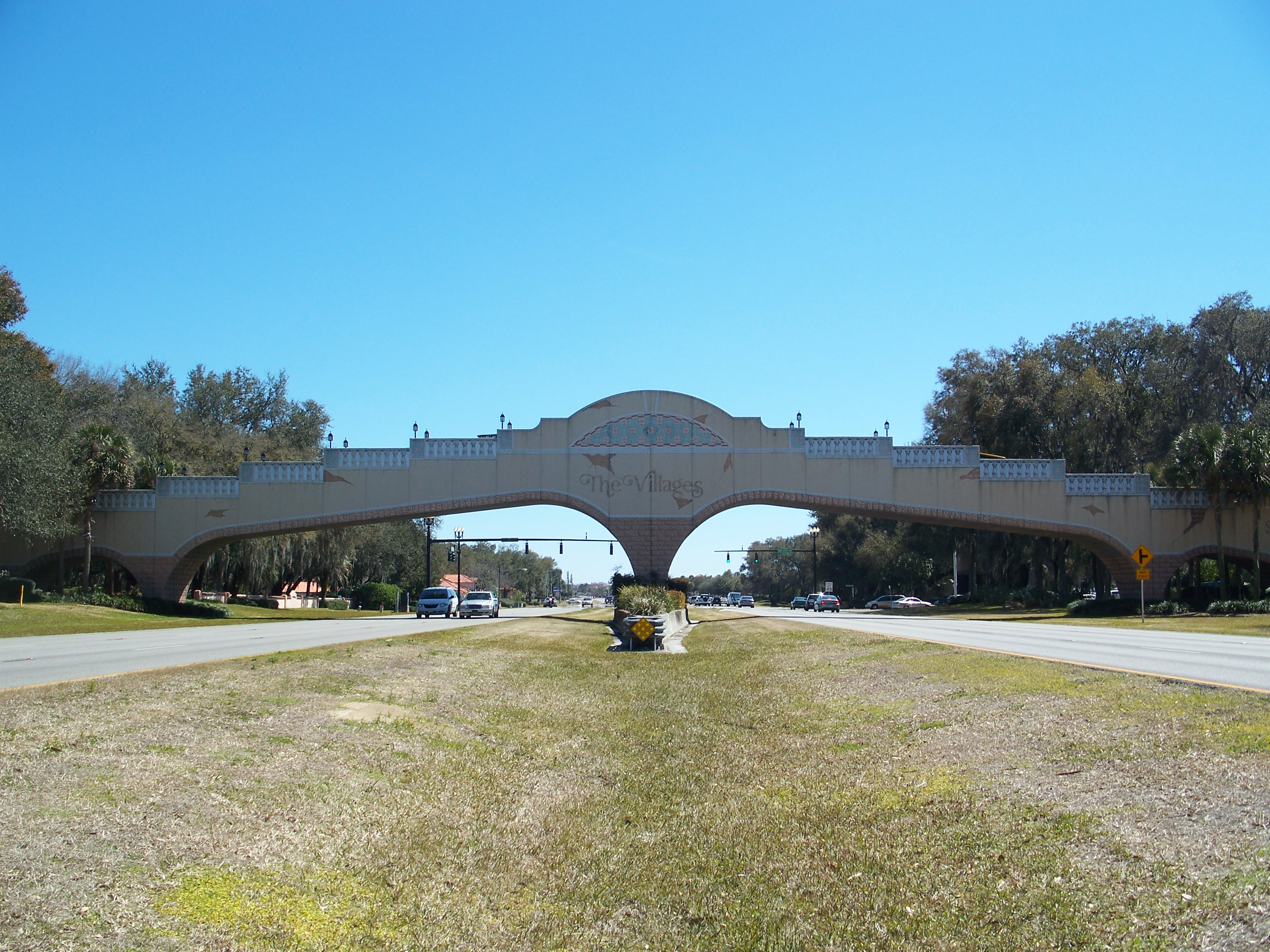
Golf cart bridge over US 27/US 441, in The Villages

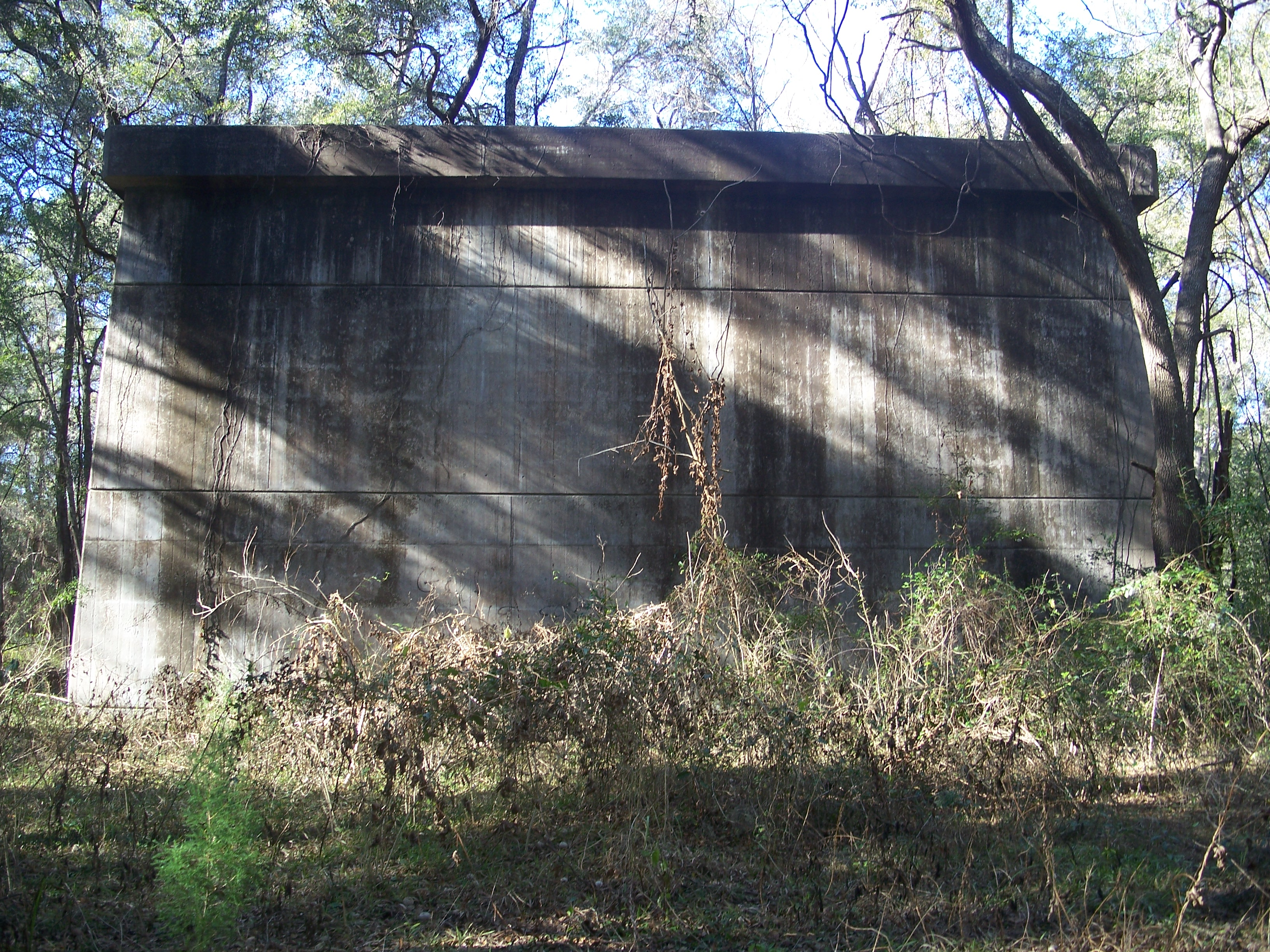
A surviving support for a never-completed bridge that was part of the Cross Florida Barge Canal project, in the US 441 median in Santos.

Around the Lake-Marion County border, US 27-441 enters a retirement community known as The Villages. Because of the frequent use of street-legal golf cars in the community, bridges and tunnels for these carts can be found throughout the road. US 27-441 leaves The Villages as it approaches County Road 42, a bicounty east–west scenic route through Central Florida. North of here, it serves as the eastern terminus of a newly constructed bypass to CR 484 in Summerfield. Within Belleview, the road encounters two somewhat important intersections, County Road 25A, and then State Road 35. SR 35 joins US 27-441 in a wrong-way concurrency with SR 500 as the road curves more to the west, until it reaches the intersection with US 301, where SR 35 turns south, and SR 500 becomes the hidden state road for US 27-301-441 for a few blocks. However SR 25 reunites with the triplex at the former eastern terminus of CR 484, and shares a concurrency with SR 25, and US 27-301-441's new secret route becomes SRs 25-500 once again. After that, the road curves more to the north again. Near the right-of-way for the formerly proposed Cross Florida Barge Canal in Santos, the median for the road widens, as it contains supports for a bridge that was never completed when the Canal project was cancelled. Before the median narrows back down to normal again, it intersects CR 328, where a police station exists in the median. To the west of this intersection is the Santos Trail System trailhead of the Cross Florida Greenway.

Before US 27-301-441 enters Ocala, it veers off to the left at an intersection with County Road 464A (Southeast Lake Weir Avenue), a former segment of US 441 that eventually leads to Ocala Union Station. The first major intersection after this is 31st Street. Then, it crosses under a railroad bridge before reaching the city limits and the intersections with the northern terminus of CR 475 and crossing SR 464 (17th Street). US 27-301-441 intersects with SR 200 (becoming the new hidden state road until US 301 reaches US 1-23). The highway reaches the heart of Ocala at the intersection with SR 40 (West Silver Springs Boulevard). After this, the road crosses a railroad bridge west of Ocala Union Station. Five blocks later, it reaches the intersection of SR 492 (Northwest 10th Street) only to move in the opposite direction, leaving the US 301-441 overlap and taking SR 500 with it, as they head northwest towards Williston, Perry, Tallahassee, and points north. Before US 301-441 leaves Ocala, it has an intersection with County Road 200A (Northwest 20th Street), which runs east and then north. This road was the former State Road 200A and decommissioned U.S. Route 301 Alternate.

After County Road 464A (North Magnolia Avenue) terminates at the southeast corner of the intersection of US 301-441 and Northwest 28th Street, another county alternate which was a former section of US 441-SR 25 begins on the opposite side. This road is CR 25A (Northwest Gainesville Road), which is also the decommissioned U.S. Route 441 Alternate, and runs northwest through towns such as Zuber, Lowell, and Reddick. East of Zuber, the road intersects SR 326, which originally had a short concurrency, but now directly crosses US 301-441. South of the intersection with CR 329 is an interchange with U.S. Route 441 between Sparr and Lowell, where the US 301-441 concurrency ends. US 301 moves northeast towards Waldo, Starke, and Jacksonville, taking SR 200 with it, while US 441 moves northwest.

=== Reddick to the state line ===
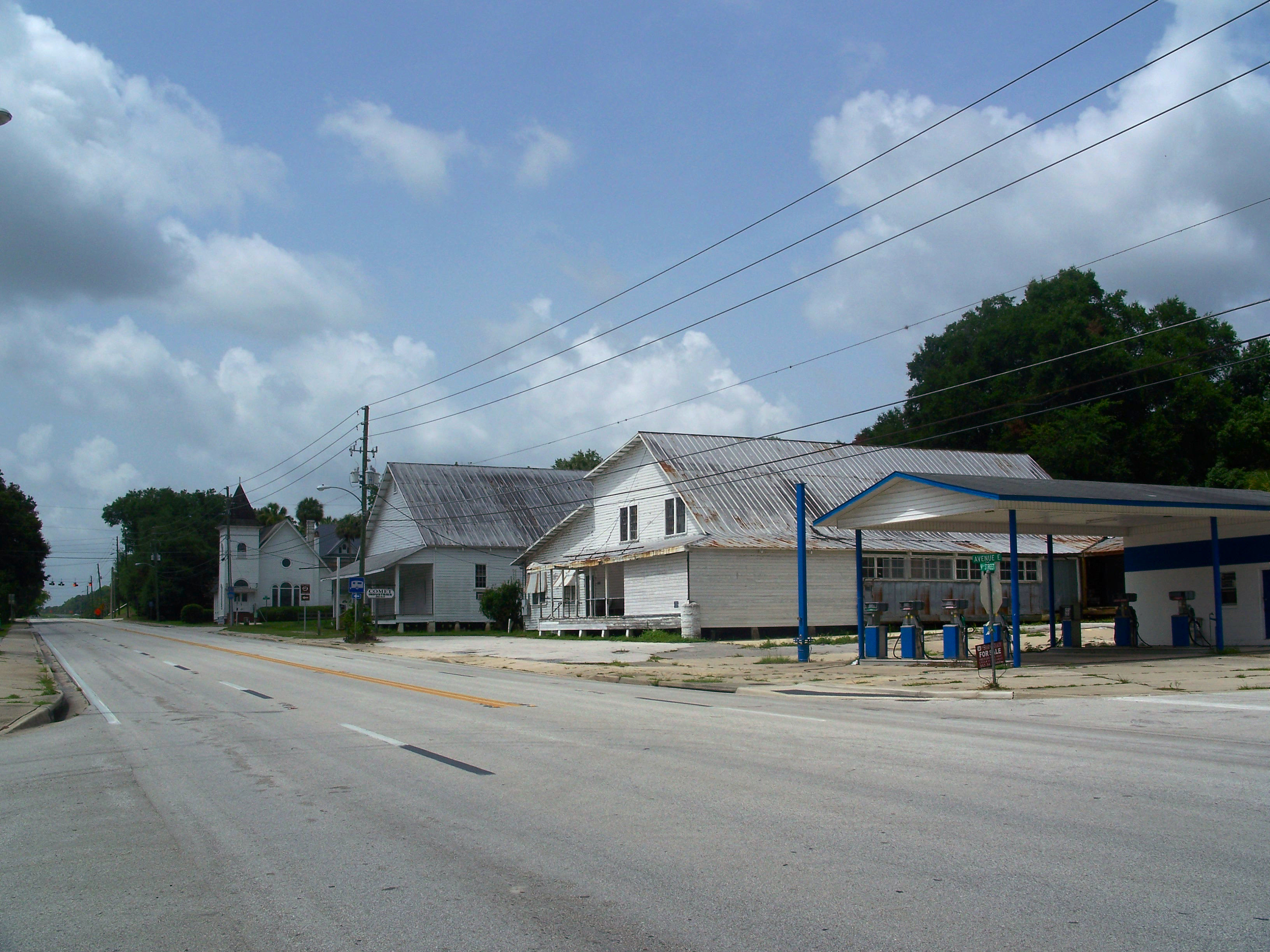
US 441 in McIntosh, looking south

In Reddick, US 441 continues to the northwest, serving as the northern terminus of CR 25A. From there, it intersects CR 318, which provides access to I-75 in Irvine to the west and Salt Springs in Ocala National Forest to the east. The road then runs through communities such as Orange Lake and McIntosh, where it passes through the McIntosh Historic District before crossing the Marion-Alachua County Line near the town of Evinston. It passes by a turnoff to Cross Creek before entering Micanopy, then runs across Paynes Prairie Preserve State Park and goes through Gainesville as 13th Street, serving as the eastern edge of the University of Florida campus. After intersecting SR 331 and later SRs 24A-226, State Road 24 joins US 441 in a brief concurrency until it reaches State Road 26 and turns east. US 441 continues north of UF territory as it becomes the western terminus of State Road 120, then intersects State Road 222, before curving to the northwest and finally joining State Road 20, thereby converting it into an additional hidden state road. At the intersection of SR 121, the DeSoto Trail moves from SR 121 to US 441. In Alachua, US 441 intersects with SR 235, and then runs under an interchange with Interstate 75 (Exit 399), with quarter-cloverleaf interchanges on the northeast and northwest corners.

Just as it did in Leesburg, US 441 in High Springs curves to the right while a state road becomes independent, specifically SR 20, which runs west only to join US 27 as they head towards Perry, Tallahassee, and Niceville. Meanwhile, as it did with US 27 in Leesburg, US 441 joins US 41 north, but here it also serves as the northern terminus of hidden SR 45. US 41-441 crosses the Santa Fe River then runs north passing by O'Leno State Park and River Rise Preserve State Park, near which it shares a brief concurrency with State Road 18. It then runs through Ellisville, where it has another interchange with I-75 (Exit 414), just south of the western terminus of State Road 238.

Entering Lake City, US 441 splits from US 41 onto State Road 25A south of the city. The routes remain parallel, and at the US 90 Lake City Truck Route, Route 441 is joined by State Road 47, which was signed as terminating at US 41. The first intersection within this new hidden route is at U.S. Route 90 (where the DeSoto Trail heads west) to the northern extents of Lake City. Past Lake City, SR 25 branches off to the northwest as County Road 25A, which also shares intersections with CR 250 to the east and Northeast Double Run Road to the northeast. US 441 has an interchange with Interstate 10 (Exit 303), then skirts the western edge of the Okefenokee Swamp and east bank of the Suwannee River as it enters Georgia.

== History ==
A US 441 shield used in Florida prior to 1993

US 441 was first designated in 1926 running from Ocala to Orlando. In 1937, it was extended north to High Springs. In 1948, it was extended beyond Florida and would eventually extend as far as Rocky Top, Tennessee. On the south end, US 441 was extended from Orlando to Miami in 1950, which completed its route in Florida.

In 1952, US 441 (along with US 301) was realigned to bypass downtown Ocala on an expanded Pine Avenue, which included overpasses over the area's railroad lines. US 441 previously entered Ocala from the south along SW 1st Avenue, then north along SE 1st Avenue and Magnolia Avenue.

The current alignment of US 441 (and US 27) between Lady Lake and Belleview was built in 1960. The former alignment of US 441 and US 27 around Lake Weir was then designated as US 441/US 27 Alternate but it has since been relinquished to county control.

The current four-lane segment of US 441 (along the concurrency with US 98 and SR 80) between Belle Glade and Twenty Mile Bend, designated as the Kenneth C. Mock Memorial Highway, was completed in 1989. This segment was built to make US 441 a four-lane divided highway between Belle Glade and West Palm Beach. Prior to this, US 441 (and SR 80) ran just to the south and entered Belle Glade along what is now County Road 880. US 98, which previously ran along SR 700 (Conners Highway), would later be rerouted onto this route beginning around 2000.

From 1956, signs for U.S. highways in Florida had different colors for each highway. The "shield" for US 441 was brown, until the state was forced by the federal government to conform to standards that required consistent black-and-white signs in 1993.

Between 2007 and 2011, the Florida Department of Transportation rebuilt the NW 7th Avenue Bridge over the Miami River.

== Major intersections ==
County	Location	mi	km	Destinations	Notes
Miami-Dade	Miami	0.000	0.000	US 41 east (Southwest 8th Street)	SW 8th Avenue continues south; southern terminus of SR 7
Miami-Dade	Miami	0.066	0.106	US 41 west (Southwest 7th Street)	
Miami-Dade	Miami	0.464	0.747	SR 968 east (Southwest 1st Street)	
Miami-Dade	Miami	0.532	0.856	SR 968 west (Flagler Street)	
Miami-Dade	Miami	0.87	1.40	Fifth Street Bridge over Miami River	
Miami-Dade	Miami	3.075	4.949	US 27 (Northwest 36th Street)	
Miami-Dade	Miami	4.126	6.640	SR 944 (Northwest 54th Street) to I-95	
Miami-Dade	Miami	5.649	9.091	SR 934 (Northwest 79th Street) to I-95	Two-way street carries only SR 934 eastbound but is signed from US 441 to SR 934 west
Miami-Dade		5.773	9.291	SR 934 west (Northwest 81st Street)	
Miami-Dade	Pinewood	7.171	11.541	To SR 932 (Northwest 103rd Street) / I-95	
Miami-Dade	North Miami	8.171	13.150	SR 924 (Gratigny Road) to I-95	
Miami-Dade	North Miami	8.546	13.753	SR 922 east (North Miami Boulevard) to I-95	Western terminus of SR 922
Miami-Dade	North Miami	9.172	14.761	To SR 916 east (Northwest 135th Street) / I-95 – Airport	
Miami-Dade	North Miami	9.273	14.923	SR 916 west (Opa-locka Boulevard)	
Miami-Dade	Golden Glades	10.9	17.5	SR 9 south – Opa-locka	No northbound exit; southern terminus of concurrency with SR 9
Miami-Dade	Golden Glades	11.1	17.9	Florida's Turnpike north / SR 826 west	No southbound exit
Miami-Dade	Golden Glades	11.4	18.3	SR 826 east – Beaches	
Miami-Dade	North Miami Beach	11.8	19.0	I-95 (SR 9 north)	Same-directional movements only; northern terminus of SR 9A; northern terminus of concurrency with SR 9
Miami-Dade	Miami Gardens	12.044	19.383	To Northwest 7th Avenue Extension west / SR 826 north / Florida's Turnpike / Florida's Turnpike Extension	
Miami-Dade	Miami Gardens	12.604	20.284	SR 860 (Miami Gardens Drive) to I-95	
Miami-Dade	Miami Gardens	13.598	21.884	To I-95 / Honey Hill Drive / Ives Dairy Road	Former SR 854
Miami-Dade–Broward county line	Miami Gardens–West Park– Miramar tripoint	14.680	23.625	SR 852 west (County Line Road) to Florida's Turnpike	Eastern terminus of SR 852
Broward	Miramar–West Park line	15.492	24.932	SR 858 east (Hallandale Beach Boulevard) / CR 858 west (Miramar Parkway) to I-95 / SR A1A / I-75	Eastern terminus of CR 858; western terminus of SR 858
Broward	Miramar–West Park– Hollywood tripoint	16.228	26.116	SR 824 (Pembroke Road) to I-95	
Broward	Hollywood	17.258	27.774	SR 820 (Hollywood Boulevard) to I-95 / Florida's Turnpike	
Broward	Hollywood	18.771	30.209	SR 822 east / CR 822 west (Sheridan Street) to I-95	
Broward	Hollywood	19.770	31.817	SR 848 (Stirling Road) to I-95	
Broward	Hollywood–Davie line	20.906	33.645	SR 818 (Griffin Road) to I-95 / Florida's Turnpike	
Broward	Davie–Fort Lauderdale– Broadview Park tripoint	22.47	36.16	I-595 / SR 84 to Florida's Turnpike	
Broward	Fort Lauderdale–Broadview Park line	23.822	38.338	SR 736 east (Davie Boulevard) to US 1 / I-95	Western terminus of SR 736
Broward	Plantation	24.964	40.176	SR 842 (Broward Boulevard) to I-95 / US 1 / SR 817	
Broward	Lauderhill–Plantation line	25.99	41.83	SR 838 (Sunrise Boulevard) to I-95 / Florida's Turnpike	Interchange
Broward	Lauderdale Lakes	27.980	45.029	SR 816 (Oakland Park Boulevard) to I-95	
Broward	Tamarac	29.474	47.434	SR 870 (Commercial Boulevard) to I-95 / Florida's Turnpike / SR 869	
Broward	North Lauderdale	30.90	49.73	McNab Road / Northwest 62nd Street	interchange
Broward	Margate	32.837	52.846	SR 814 east / CR 814 west (Atlantic Boulevard) to I-95 / Florida's Turnpike / SR 869 (Sawgrass Expressway)	
Broward	Margate	33.529	53.960	To Florida's Turnpike / Coconut Creek Parkway (CR 912 east)	Western terminus of unsigned CR 912
Broward	Margate–Coral Springs– Coconut Creek tripoint	35.57	57.24	SR 834 (Sample Road) to I-95 / Florida's Turnpike	Interchange
Broward	Coconut Creek–Coral Springs– Parkland tripoint	37.36	60.13	SR 869 (Sawgrass Expressway) to Florida's Turnpike – Miami, West Palm Beach	SR 869 exit 18
Broward	Coconut Creek–Parkland line	38.563	62.061	SR 810 east (Hillsboro Boulevard) to I-95	Western terminus of SR 810
Broward	Coconut Creek–Parkland line	39.158	63.019	Loxahatchee Road (CR 827)	
Palm Beach		40.756	65.590	Palmetto Park Road (CR 798) to I-95 / US 1 / SR A1A	Former SR 798
Palm Beach		42.022	67.628	SR 808 east / CR 808 west (Glades Road) to Florida's Turnpike / I-95	Western terminus of SR 808; Eastern terminus of CR 808
Palm Beach		43.831	70.539	Yamato Road (CR 794 east)	Western terminus of CR 794
Palm Beach		47.941	77.154	SR 806 east (West Atlantic Avenue) to I-95 / Florida's Turnpike	Western terminus of SR 806
Palm Beach		53.015	85.319	SR 804 east (Boynton Beach Boulevard) to I-95 / Florida's Turnpike	Western terminus of SR 804
Palm Beach		57.408	92.389	CR 812 east (Lantana Road) to I-95 / US 1	Western terminus of CR 812; former SR 812
Palm Beach		59.200	95.273	To SR 802 east (Lake Worth Road) / US 1 / Florida's Turnpike	Western terminus of SR 802
Palm Beach	Wellington	61.496	98.968	SR 882 east (Forest Hill Boulevard) to US 1 / I-95	Western terminus of SR 882
Palm Beach	Royal Palm Beach	63.556	102.283	US 98 east / SR 80 east (Southern Boulevard) to Florida's Turnpike / I-95 – West Palm Beach SR 7 north	Interchange; south end of US 98 / SR 80 overlap; north end of SR 7 overlap
Palm Beach	Royal Palm Beach–Wellington line	66.325	106.740	Forest Hill Boulevard / Crestwood Boulevard	
Palm Beach	Twenty Mile Bend	75.024	120.739	CR 880 west	Eastern terminus of CR 880
Palm Beach		79.933	128.640	SR 700 west / CR 700 east – Canal Point	Former US 98 west
Palm Beach		93.270	150.104	SR 15 south / SR 80 west to US 27 – Belle Glade, South Bay, Clewiston, Orlando SR 812 west (Hooker Highway) – Pahokee, Canal Point, truck bypass to South Bay	North end of SR 80 overlap; south end of SR 15 overlap
Palm Beach	Pahokee	99.574	160.249	SR 729 north (State Market Road)	Southern terminus of SR 729
Palm Beach	Pahokee	101.000	162.544	SR 715 south (Bacom Point Road) / East First Street	Northern terminus of SR 715
Palm Beach	Pahokee	102.982	165.733	SR 729 south (State Market Road)	Northern terminus of SR 729
Palm Beach	Canal Point	104.525	168.217	SR 700 east – West Palm Beach	Southern terminus of concurrency with SR 700; former US 98 east
Martin	Port Mayaca	112.789	181.516	SR 76 east (Kanner Highway) to I-95 – Indiantown, Stuart	Western terminus of SR 76
Okeechobee		125.840	202.520	CR 15B east (Southeast 126th Boulevard) to SR 710	
Okeechobee		129.291	208.074	CR 15A east (Southeast 86th Boulevard) to SR 710	
Okeechobee	Taylor Creek	133.61	215.02	Taylor Creek Bridge over Taylor Creek	
Okeechobee	Okeechobee	135.707	218.399	SR 78 west – Moore Haven, Ft. Myers	Eastern terminus of SR 78
Okeechobee	Okeechobee	138.841	223.443	US 98 north / SR 70 (Park Street (SR 700)) to SR 710 south / Florida's Turnpike / I-95 – Arcadia, Ft. Pierce	Northern terminus of concurrency with US 98 / SR 700
Okeechobee	Okeechobee	141.231	227.289	CR 718 west (Northwest 36th Street) to US 98	County road shields on 441 read "NW 36 ST" instead of "718"; otherwise, route is unsigned.
Okeechobee		148.986	239.770	CR 68 west (Northeast 160th Street) to US 98	
Okeechobee		153.071	246.344	CR 68 east (Northeast 224th Street) to I-95 – Ft. Pierce	
Okeechobee		154.114	248.022	CR 724 west (Northwest 240th Street)	Access to Kissimmee Prairie Preserve State Park
Okeechobee	Fort Drum	158.137	254.497	CR 15C east (Northeast 304th Street)	Ft. Drum Cemetery
Osceola	Yeehaw Junction	171.736	276.382	SR 60 to Florida's Turnpike / I-95 – Lake Wales, Vero Beach	
Osceola	Kenansville	185.763	298.957	CR 523 north (South Canoe Creek Road)	
Osceola	Holopaw	205.436	330.617	US 192 east / SR 500 east – Melbourne	Southern terminus of concurrency with US 192 / SR 500
Osceola	see US 192 (mile 42.586-18.123)				
Osceola	Kissimmee	229.899	369.987	US 17 south / US 92 west / US 192 west / SR 530 west / SR 600 west / Main Street – Downtown Kissimmee, Haines City, Amtrak/SunRail	Northern terminus of concurrency with US 192; Southern terminus of concurrency with US 17 / US 92 / SR 600
Osceola	Kissimmee	232.148	373.606	CR 522 / US 17 Truck south / US 92 Truck west (Osceola Parkway) to Florida's Turnpike / I-4 – Disney World	
Orange	Hunter's Creek	234.58	377.52	SR 417 to I-4 – International Airport, Tampa, Disney World	Exit 11 on SR 417
Orange	Sky Lake	238.407	383.679	To SR 528 west / Consulate Drive	SR 528 exit 4
Orange	Sky Lake	238.66	384.09	Florida's Turnpike (SR 91) – Ocala, Miami	Turnpike exit 254
Orange	Sky Lake	238.950	384.553	To SR 528 east / Landstreet Road (CR 527A east) – International Airport	SR 528 exit 4
Orange	Sky Lake	239.947	386.157	SR 482 (Sand Lake Road) to SR 528 – Volcano Bay, Universal, International Airport, Titusville, Cape Canaveral	
Orange	Orlando	244.15	392.92	I-4 (SR 400)	Exit 80 on I-4; no access from US 441 south to I-4 east or I-4 west to US 441 north
Orange	Holden Heights	244.414	393.346	To I-4 east / Michigan Street	
Orange	Orlando	245.831	395.627	SR 408 – Downtown Orlando, Titusville, Ocoee	Exit 9 on SR 408
Orange	Orlando	246.431	396.592	SR 526 east (Washington Street / CR 526 west)	
Orange	Orlando	247.086	397.646	US 17 north / US 92 east / SR 50 (Colonial Drive / SR 600 east) to I-4 – Titusville, University of Central Florida	Northern terminus of concurrency with US 17 / US 92 / SR 600
Orange	Orlando	248.461	399.859	SR 438 (Princeton Street)	
Orange	Orlando	249.012	400.746	SR 416 west (Silver Star Road)	
Orange	Orlando	250.496	403.134	SR 423 (John Young Parkway / Lee Road) to I-4 – Winter Park	
Orange	Lockhart	253.85	408.53	SR 414 east / SR 414 west to I-4 / SR 429 – Maitland, Apopka	SR 414 exit 9
Seminole	No major junctions				
Orange	Apopka	257.66	414.66	SR 436 east – Altamonte Springs	interchange
Orange	Apopka	258.027	415.254	Alabama Avenue (CR 424 east)	
Orange	Apopka	258.477	415.978	CR 435 (Park Avenue)	
Orange	Apopka	258.608	416.189	CR 437A south (Central Avenue / CR 424 west)	
Orange	Apopka	259.77	418.06	SR 451 south to SR 429 south / SR 414 east / Vick Road – Orlando, Maitland, Ocoee, Winter Garden, Tampa	
Orange	Plymouth	261.713	421.186	CR 437 north (Plymouth Sorrento Road)	south end of CR 437 overlap
Orange	Plymouth	261.849	421.405	CR 437 south (Orange Avenue) – Ocoee, Winter Garden	north end of CR 437 overlap
Orange	Apopka	262.138	421.870	To SR 429 / SR 414 east / SR 429 Connector Road – Orlando, Tampa, Maitland, Daytona Beach	
Orange	Zellwood	265.773	427.720	CR 448 Truck west (Jones Avenue)	
Orange	Tangerine	267.327	430.221	CR 448 west (Sadler Road) – Lake Jem	
Orange		269.316	433.422	CR 500A north – Mt. Dora	Former SR 500A
Lake	Mount Dora	270.71	435.67	SR 46 east – Sorrento, Sanford	Western terminus of SR 46 western segment
Lake	Mount Dora	273.184	439.647	SR 44 east / Donnelly Street – to bypass SR 19 north, Downtown Mount Dora	former CR 44B
Lake	Eustis–Mount Dora line	275.123	442.768	CR 44C south (Eudora Road)	
Lake	Eustis	275.77	443.81	SR 19 north / CR 19A south – Eustis, Umatilla, Mt. Dora	interchange; south end of SR 19 overlap
Lake	Eustis	276.066	444.285	CR 19A south / Plaza Drive	
Lake	Tavares	279.017	449.034	SR 19 south / Orange Avenue	north end of SR 19 overlap
Lake	Tavares	279.213	449.350	To Lakeshore Boulevard (SR 500A) south south / SR 19 – Tavares, Business District, Mt. Dora	
Lake	Leesburg	281.530	453.079	CR 473 north	
Lake	Leesburg	283.648	456.487	CR 449 north (Stewart Lane) – Silver Lake	
Lake	Leesburg	284.439	457.760	CR 44 Leg A west	
Lake	Leesburg	285.363	459.247	CR 44 east – Lisbon	
Lake	Leesburg	287.163	462.144	SR 44 west (East Dixie Avenue) to US 27 south	
Lake	Leesburg	289.300	465.583	US 27 south (North 14th Street / SR 25) – Clermont	Southern terminus of concurrency with US 27 / SR 25
Lake	Leesburg	289.524	465.944	CR 44A west (Griffin Road)	
Lake	Leesburg	290.187	467.011	CR 466A east (Picciola Road)	
Lake	Fruitland Park	290.786	467.975	CR 25A north	
Lake	Fruitland Park	292.039	469.991	CR 466A west (Miller Street) – Wildwood	
Lake	Fruitland Park	292.502	470.736	CR 25A south	
Lake	Lady Lake	296.211	476.705	CR 466 west	
Lake	Lady Lake	296.619	477.362	CR 25 north – Weirsdale	Northern terminus of concurrency with SR 25
Sumter	No major junctions				
Marion		302.23	486.39	CR 42 – Pedro, Weirsdale	
Marion		306.211	492.799	To I-75 / Southeast 132nd Street Road	south bypass of Belleview
Marion	Belleview	307.889	495.499	CR 25A east	
Marion	Belleview	308.784	496.940	US 301 south (SR 35) – Wildwood	Southern terminus of concurrency with US 301
Marion	Belleview	308.973	497.244	SR 25 south / CR 484 west to SR 35 / I-75 – Dunnellon, Ocklawaha	Southern terminus of concurrency with SR 25; Eastern terminus of CR 484
Marion	Santos	313.206	504.056	CR 328 west (Southeast 80th Street) – Santos, Santos Trailhead (Cross Florida Greenway)	
Marion		316.414	509.219	CR 464A (Lake Weir Avenue)	
Marion	Ocala	318.130	511.981	CR 475 south	
Marion	Ocala	318.692	512.885	SR 464 west (Southwest 17th Street) to SR 200	
Marion	Ocala	319.221	513.736	SR 200 west (Southwest 10th Street) to I-75 – Hernando, Inverness, College of Central Florida	Southern terminus of concurrency with SR 200
Marion	Ocala	319.760	514.604	SR 40 (West Silver Springs Boulevard) – Dunnellon, Silver Springs, Business District	
Marion	Ocala	320.451	515.716	US 27 north / SR 492 east (Bonnie Heath Boulevard / SR 500 north) to I-75 – Williston, Silver Springs	Northern terminus of concurrency with US 27 (and unsigned SR 500); Western terminus of SR 492
Marion	Ocala	321.097	516.756	CR 200A north (Northwest 20th Street)	
Marion	Ocala	321.962	518.148	CR 25A north (Northwest Gainesville Road) – Lowell, Reddick	
Marion		324.843	522.784	SR 326 (Ocala Bypass) to I-75 / SR 40 east – Ormond Beach	
Marion		327.351	526.820	Northwest 100th Street - Martin, Anthony	
Marion		330.246	531.479	CR 329 – Lowell, Sparr	
Marion		330.372	531.682	US 301 north (SR 200) – Starke	Interchange; northbound exit and southbound entrance; northern terminus of concurrency with US 301 / SR 200
Marion		332.637	535.327	CR 316 – Reddick, Fairfield	
Marion		336.048	540.817	CR 25A south (Northwest Gainesville Road)	
Marion		336.680	541.834	CR 318 to I-75 – Irvine, Citra	
Marion	McIntosh	339.422	546.247	CR 320 west (Avenue G)	
Marion–Alachua county line		342.413	551.060	Southeast 185th Avenue / Northwest 320th Street - Evinston	
Alachua		344.139	553.838	Southeast 165th Avenue - Micanopy	
Alachua	Micanopy	344.432	554.310	CR 346 east – Cross Creek	
Alachua	Micanopy	345.321	555.740	CR 234 east / Southeast Cholokka Boulevard – Historic Micanopy, Museum	
Alachua		345.987	556.812	CR 234 west to I-75 – Micanopy	
Alachua		354.041	569.774	SR 331 (Southwest Williston Road) to SR 329 / I-75 – Williston, Waldo, truck route to SR 121 north / US 441 north	
Alachua	Gainesville	355.538	572.183	SR 226 / SR 24A (Southwest 16th Avenue) to I-75	
Alachua	Gainesville	355.917	572.793	SR 24 west (Archer Road) – University Medical Center, VA Hospital	Southern terminus of concurrency with SR 24
Alachua	Gainesville	356.616	573.918	SR 24 east / SR 26 (West University Avenue) to I-75	Northern terminus of concurrency with SR 24
Alachua	Gainesville	358.127	576.350	SR 120 east (Northwest 23rd Avenue)	
Alachua	Gainesville	359.131	577.965	SR 222 (Northwest 39th Avenue) to I-75 – truck route to SR 121 south / US 441 south	
Alachua	Gainesville	359.884	579.177	SR 20 east (Northwest 6th Street)	Southern terminus of concurrency with SR 20
Alachua	Gainesville	360.243	579.755	CR 232 (Northwest 53rd Avenue)	
Alachua	Gainesville	361.105	581.142	SR 121 (Northwest 22nd Street) – Williston, LaCrosse	
Alachua	Alachua	365.792	588.685	CR 25A north (Northwest 120th Lane)	
Alachua	Alachua	366.837	590.367	CR 237 north – Hague	
Alachua	Alachua	367.229	590.998	CR 25A south (Northwest 126th Avenue)	
Alachua	Alachua	369.549	594.731	CR 2054 west (Rachael Boulevard)	
Alachua	Alachua	371.674	598.151	SR 235 (Northwest 140th Street) – Newberry, LaCrosse	
Alachua	Alachua	373.01	600.30	I-75 (SR 93) – Tampa, Lake City	Exit 399 on I-75
Alachua	Alachua	373.788	601.553	CR 235A (Northwest 173rd Street)	
Alachua	High Springs	377.744	607.920	SR 20 west (Northeast 1st Avenue) to US 27 – Ft. White, Ichetucknee Springs State Park, Downtown High Springs	Northern terminus of concurrency with SR 20
Alachua	High Springs	378.366	608.921	US 41 south / CR 236 east (North Main Street / SR 45) to US 27 – Newberry, Santa Fe, Downtown High Springs	Southern terminus of concurrency with US 41; Northern terminus of SR 45
see US 41 (mile 408.870-431.599)
Columbia		401.095	645.500	US 41 north / US 441 Truck north (SR 25)	Northern terminus of concurrency with US 41 / SR 25; Southern terminus of SR 25A
Columbia	Lake City	403.630	649.580	SR 10A (Baya Drive)	
Columbia	Lake City	404.065	650.280	US 90 (Duval Street / SR 10 / SR 47 south / SR 100 east) to SR 100	south end of SR 47 / SR 100 overlap
Columbia	Lake City	405.034	651.839	US 441 Truck south (Bascom Norris Drive / CR 100A / truck route to US 90 / SR 100 east)	
Columbia	Five Points	405.441	652.494	CR 25A north / Gum Swamp Road (CR 250 east)	north end of SR 25A overlap
Columbia	Lake City	407.67	656.08	I-10 (SR 8) – Live Oak, Jacksonville	Exit 303 on I-10
Columbia		412.896	664.492	CR 246 west (Northwest Lassie Black Street)	
Columbia		427.417	687.861	CR 6 west – Jasper	
Columbia		433.050	696.926	US 441 north / SR 89 north – Fargo, Homerville	Georgia state line
1.000 mi = 1.609 km; 1.000 km = 0.621 mi: Concurrency terminus; Incomplete access

== Related routes ==
At least six other special routes of US 441 have existed in Florida, however only two exist today.

- U.S. Route 441 Business – Tangerine to Tavares; former Mount Dora Business route, now County Road Old 441. In Mt. Dora and Tavares, former SR S-500A.
- U.S. Route 441 Alternate – Lady Lake to Belleview; former route co-signed with Alternate U.S. Route 27.
- U.S. Route 441 Alternate – Ocala to Reddick; Today CR 25A.
- U.S. Route 441 Truck – Gainesville
- U.S. Route 441 Truck – Lake City

== In popular culture ==
Route 441 is mentioned in the song "American Girl" by Tom Petty and the Heartbreakers. Petty was a native of Gainesville.

U.S. Route 441
Previous state: Terminus	Florida	Next state: Georgia
