= Special routes of U.S. Route 441 =

Special routes of U.S. Route 441

Highway system
- United States Numbered Highway System; List; Special; Divided

A total of at least eleven special routes of U.S. Route 441 (US 441) have existed, and at least three have been deleted. These special routes include alternate routes, business loops, truck routes, and bypass routes which connect to US 441 in the US states of Florida, Georgia, North Carolina, and Tennessee.

In addition, both termini of the Gatlinburg Bypass in Tennessee are at US 441, but that road does not carry a route number.

== Existing ==
=== Gainesville truck route ===
U.S. Highway 441 Truck
- Location: Gainesville

U.S. Route 441 Truck in Gainesville, Florida was created in order to divert trucks form the congested downtown areas of Gainesville. The route begins at the intersection of Florida State Road 331, which is also concurrent with the Florida State Road 24, 26, and 121 Truck Routes. The four truck routes run northeast along SR 331 and then curve to the north. SR 331 terminates at the east end of the overlap of SRs 20, 24, and 26, which also serves as the terminus of Florida Truck Routes 24 and 26. However US 441 Truck and Florida Truck Route 121 continue to the northeast until the intersection with Florida State Road 222. At this point, the truck routes turn west overlapping SR 222 and intersection Florida State Road 20. US Truck Route 441 terminates at the intersection of SR 222 and US 441. North of that terminus, Florida Truck Route 121 makes a right turn and follows US 441 northbound until the intersection with its parent route.

=== Lake City truck route ===
U.S. Highway 441 Truck
- Location: Lake City, Florida

U.S. Route 441 Truck in Lake City, Florida was formed in the 1960s in order to divert trucks from the historic and congested downtown areas of Lake City. The route begins at the northern terminus of the US 41/US 441 concurrency and runs north along US 41. After US 41 curves to the northwest, the truck route turns east onto County Road 100A for 0.4 miles (0.64 km) then terminates at US 441, while CR 100A continues east towards SR 100.

=== Dublin bypass route ===
U.S. Highway 441 Bypass
- Location: Dublin, Georgia
- Length: 8.3 mi (13.4 km)

U.S. Route 441 Bypass (US 441 Byp.) is an 8.3-mile-long (13.4 km) bypass of US 441 in the Dublin, Georgia metropolitan area that has existed since 2003. It is concurrent with SR 117 for its entire length.

The entire length of US 441 Byp. is part of the National Highway System, a system of routes determined to be the most important for the nation's economy, mobility, and defense.

=== Milledgeville business loop ===
U.S. Highway 441 Business
- Location: Milledgeville, Georgia
- Length: 7.1 mi (11.4 km)

U.S. Route 441 Business (US 441 Bus.) is a 7.1-mile-long (11.4 km) business route in Milledgeville, Georgia that has existed since 1992. It has concurrencies with SR 29 Bus. and SR 24.

Route description

US 441 Bus. begins in Scottsboro at an intersection with US 441/SR 29. It travels concurrent with SR 29 Bus. as Gordon Highway SW until that street ends at Irwinton Road, which is a dead end street south of the route and also a former segment of US 441.

At the combined intersections with Caraker Avenue and Swint Road SE, Irwinton Road ends and is replaced by South Wayne Street. US 441 Bus./SR 29 Bus. cross over Fishing Creek on the Mayor Harry G. Bone Bridge and enters the Milledgeville city limits. The highways travel north along South Wayne Street where it becomes the former northwestern terminus of SR 112 Spur. At intersection of West Franklin Street and East Franklin Street, the highways turn left onto West Franklin where it passes Memory Hill Cemetery, until it reaches South Clark Street where they turn north. Three blocks later, the highways intersect SR 49 (East Hancock Road), where it travels along the western edge of Georgia College until it reaches SR 22/SR 24 (West Montgomery Street). Here, US 441 Bus./SR 29 Bus. turns west. One block later, US 441 Bus./SR 24/SR 29 Bus. turns right at North Columbia Street. After a railroad crossing and the intersection with Martin Luther King Junior Drive, the road curves northwest, serving as a commercial strip. US 441 Bus. and SR 29 Bus. ends at US 441/SR 29, and SR 29 ends there as well, but US 441 continues along SR 24 (North Columbia Street) to Watkinsville.

=== Eatonton business loop ===
U.S. Highway 441 Business
- Location: Eatonton, Georgia

U.S. Route 441 Business (US 441 Business) is a 4-mile-long (6.4 km) business route in Eatonton, Georgia that has existed since 1991. The route is concurrent with US 129 Business/SR 24 Business for its entire length.

=== Madison bypass route ===
U.S. Highway 441 Bypass
- Location: Madison, Georgia

U.S. Route 441 Bypass (US 441 Bypass) is a 5-mile-long (8.0 km) bypass route of Madison, Georgia that is concurrent with US 129 Bypass/SR 24 Bypass for its entire length. The route has existed since 1991.

=== Watkinsville business loop ===
U.S. Highway 441 Business
- Location: Watkinsville, Georgia

U.S. Route 441 Business (US 441 Business) is a 3-mile-long (4.8 km) business route in Watkinsville, Georgia that is concurrent with US 129 Business/SR 24 Business for its entire length. The route has existed since 1995.

=== Commerce business loop ===
U.S. Highway 441 Business
- Location: Commerce, Georgia
- Length: 4.1 mi (6.6 km)

U.S. Route 441 Business (US 441 Bus.) is a 4.1-mile-long (6.6 km) business route partially within Commerce, Georgia. It has existed since 1992.

Route description

The route begins at the second intersection with US 441/SR 15 and SR 334, traveling concurrently with SR 334 on South Elm Street along the west side of a railroad line. SR 334 ends at SR 98, and as it does the northbound lane crosses the tracks, while westbound SR 98 joins US 441 Bus. (South Broad Street) in another concurrency. US 441/SR 98 travels on both sides of the tracks with two lanes in each direction, with occasional U-turns crossing the tracks. Southbound and eastbound lanes run along Elm Street, while northbound and westbound lanes run along Broad Street.

Further downtown, the route encounters the western terminus of SR 326 (Central Avenue). The lanes move further away from the tracks at the intersections of Atlanta Avenue with Elm Street and Line Street with Broad Street, but narrows back down towards the tracks before approaching SR 15 Alt. (Jefferson Street/Homer Road), where US 441 Bus. turns north. The area along US 441 Bus./SR 15 Alt. is mostly mixed commercial and residential zoning. After crossing a power line right of way between a manufactured home community and a mobile home park diagonally across from one another, the surroundings become more rural, mostly with forestland. After a culvert over Beaverdam Creek it has a wye intersection with a former segment of the road followed by another one with Hospital Road. US 441 Bus./SR 15 Alt. ends at US 441/SR 15 but also serves as the southern terminus of SR 59.

=== Baldwin–Hollywood business route ===
U.S. Highway 441 Business
- Location: Baldwin–Hollywood, Georgia
- Length: 15.3 mi (24.6 km)

U.S. Route 441 Business (US 441 Bus.) is a 15.3-mile-long (24.6 km) business route of US 441 that has existed since 1990. It is concurrent with SR 385 for its entire length. The road is also signed as "Historic US Route 441." It connects Baldwin, Cornelia, Demorest, Clarkesville, and Hollywood.

=== Franklin business route ===
U.S. Highway 441 Business
- Location: Franklin, North Carolina

U.S. Route 441 Business (US 441 Business) is a 2-mile-long (3.2 km) business route in Franklin, North Carolina that has existed since 1974.

=== Cherokee business route ===
U.S. Highway 441 Business
- Location: Cherokee, North Carolina

U.S. Route 441 Business (US 441 Business) is a 2-mile-long (3.2 km) business route in Cherokee, North Carolina that has existed since the 1980s.

== Former ==
=== Tangerine–Tavares business loop ===
U.S. Highway 441 Alternate
- Location: Tangerine–Tavares, Florida
- Existed: 1950's–1960

U.S. Route 441 Business (US 441 Business) was a 7.1-mile-long (11.4 km) former segment that ran from Tangerine to Tavares, Florida, and served Mount Dora, Florida. The route was secretly SR 500A, but was downgraded to a county road. Today it is signed as County Road 500A (in Orange County) and County Road Old 441 (in Lake County).

The former US 441 Business begins at US 441 as CR 500A in Tangerine at the historic Mount Zion Primitive Baptist Church, and runs northwest as it eventually crosses the Orange–Lake county line, becoming CR Old 441. At East Crane Avenue, Old 441 curves north and becomes South Highland Street. It runs between the Mount Dora Golf Club and a campus of the Nova Southeastern University before crossing a bridge over a former Atlantic Coast Line Railroad line. The intersection of East First Avenue is the western terminus of County Road 46, a county extension of SR 46. West of Old 441, East First Avenue is a city street. South Highland Street becomes North Highland Street from here. Four blocks later, CR Old 441 turns from North Highland Street, west onto East Fifth Avenue.

The first intersection from here is Clayton Street. A few blocks later, it runs along the south side of a large Methodist Church and then Donnelly Park between North Baker Street and the southern terminus of County Road 44B (North Donnelly Street), where Old 441 changes from East Fifth Avenue to West Fifth Avenue. After the blinking light at North McDonald Street, it curves to the right and begins to run parallel to the same former Atlantic Coast Line Railroad line on the south side that it crossed over near Mount Dora Golf Club. Though the road is on a hill here, it takes a slight downgrade along the tracks by the time it reaches the former intersections with West Sixth Avenue and Helen Street, but remains above track level until it reaches the intersection of Overlook Drive. Here, it moves slightly below the tracks as it intersects Oakland Drive and Oakland Lane, which runs under a trestle with 8 feet (2.4 m) clearance, but quickly levels our as it approaches the intersection of County Road 452 (Lakeshore Drive).

A series of convoluted turning lanes can be found at the termini of County Road 44C and County Road 19A. Old 441 moves southwest onto Tavares Road, and continues this pattern until turning straight west after Bay Road. Later, it moves away from the railroad line at Merry Road. Around Anderson Drive, Old 441 becomes East Alfred Street. Continuing westward, the former US 441 Business serves as the western terminus of County Road 19A, but not the terminus of Dora Avenue, which continues south toward Main Street. Shortly after this, it crosses a railroad line for the former Tavares Atlantic Coast Line Railroad Depot. West of Barrow Avenue, Old 441 makes a right turn from East Alfred Street to Lake Shore Boulevard, where it runs parallel to a rail trail that was originally part of the ACL line it ran parallel to in Mount Dora. The road meets its demise at a wye with SR 19, and US 441/SR 44 ending at the US 441/SR 44 section of the wye.

=== Lady Lake–Belleview alternate route ===
U.S. Highway 441 Alternate
- Location: Lady Lake-Belleview, Florida
- Existed: c. 1960–1980

A U.S. Route 441 Alternate (US 441 Alternate) around Lake Weir, from Lady Lake to Belleview existed until 1980. This was also concurrent with US 27 Alternate, and today is a bi-county maintained segment of SR 25. Prior to 1960, the 441 Alternate and 27 Alternate routes were the main U.S. 441 and U.S. 27 between Belleview and Lady Lake. By 1960, the main highways were re-routed onto a direct line between Belleview and Lady Lake. See map below.

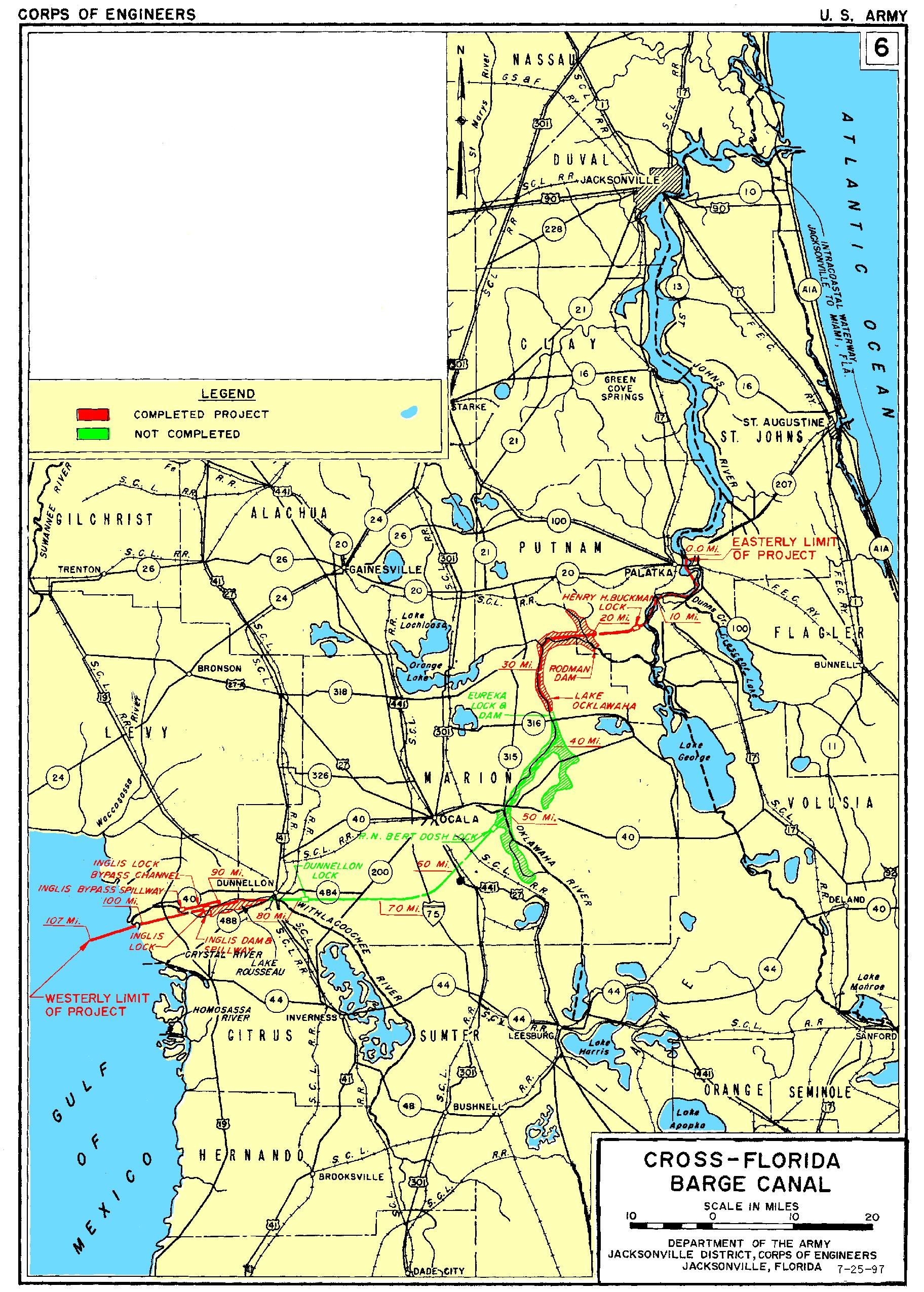
This map of the Cross Florida Barge Canal includes evidence of Alternate US 441 around Lake Weir.

The former US 27 Alternate/US 441 Alternate begins on the west side of US 27/US 441 as Oak Road across the street from a gated community. It immediately curved north, where it passed under a bridge that carried US 27/US 441, with no other access to its parent route besides Fennell Boulevard, which is across the street from another gated community (the bridge was removed in the early-2020s). The road runs east of The Villages as it crosses the Lake–Marion county line, where it straightens from northwest to north, and then curves more towards the northeast before County Road 42 in Weirsdale.

North of Weirsdale, the road served as the main route along the east shore of Lake Weir, although it's not always the closest road to the lake. It turns straight north as it enters Eastlake Weir, and continues to run along the lake curving west along the north side as it enters Ocklawaha, where it serves as both the southern terminus of County Road 464C (Southeast 135th Avenue), and later the southeastern terminus of County Road 464. After passing near Lake Weir Seaplane Base, the road heads northwest again just before the intersection with Southeast 119th Court. Closer to Belleview, the road encounters the eastern terminus of County Road 25A, and later merges with Southeast 110th Street Road. Entering the Belleview city limits, the route intersects SR 35 (County Road 35), where it briefly becomes SR 25 and immediately crosses the CSX Wildwood Subdivision, part of the CSX S-Line. The former US 27 Alternate/US 441 Alternate terminates at US 27/US 301/US 441 at the intersection with the eastern terminus of County Road 484.

=== Ocala–Reddick alternate route ===
U.S. Highway 441 Alternate
- Location: Ocala–Reddick, Florida
- Existed: 1978–1981

U.S. Route 441 Alternate (US 441 Alternate) ran for 14 miles (23 km) along a former segment of US 441 from Ocala, Florida to Reddick, Florida. Today this segment is County Road 25A and is named Northwest Gainesville Road for its entire length.

The former US 441 Alternate begins at the intersection of US 301/US 441 across from the intersection of Old Anthony Road, where it branches off to the northwest, just northwest of the northern terminus of County Road Old 441 (North Magnolia Avenue). The first sites that it passes by are the state branch of the United Pentecostal Church, and then a local school that contains a school bus parking lot of the Marion County Public School system. It ran through Northwest 27th Avenue Road and Northwest 63rd Street Kendrick, where it then made a reverse curve to the left and then right, just before intersecting SR 326 in Zuber, which connects SR 40 in Silver Springs to Interstate 75 (I-75). North of there, the road remains generally at the same northwest angle passing by many of the farms and wooded areas typical of northwestern rural Florida. Shortly after a used truck dealership across from the intersection of Northwest 89th Street is a dirt racing track previously known as the Ocala Speedway, now known as the Bubba Raceway Park A gas station can be found south of Northwest 100th Street in Martin, but it is the most notable landmark along the route. Just north of this is an otherwise non-descript field used by the Greater Ocala Dog Club. Later it passes by the Marion County Correctional Institute, then passes through the grounds of the Lowell Correctional Institution and across from the northern edge of that the Florida State Fire College North of the territory of the Fire College the route ran over a bridge over a former Atlantic Coast Line Railroad line that in recent times has been truncated in the next town, which happens to be Lowell where US 441 Alternate curved straight north had an intersection with County Road 329. US 441 Alternate continued this straight south-to-north pattern through Reddick where the road encounters an all-way stop intersection with County Road 316 which also provides access to I-75 from communities such as Citra, Fort McCoy, and Salt Springs. The straight trajectory continued until the intersection with Northwest 153rd Street, and then the route curved to the northwest again. During this curve, a former segment of that road called Northwest 44th Avenue Road branches off to the west and runs parallel to the route. After the intersection with Northwest 160th Street, the route straightened out again, and NW 44th Avenue Rd terminates with the old route. The road passes the Millwood Cemetery, and then curves northwest once again before finally terminating at an at-grade interchange with US 441.

== See also ==
- List of bannered U.S. Routes
