= Florida State Road 492 =

State highway in Florida, United States

State Road 492

Route information
- Maintained by FDOT
- Length: 3.737 mi (6.014 km)

Major junctions
- West end: US 27 / US 301 / US 441 in Ocala
- East end: SR 40 in Ocala

Location
- Country: United States
- State: Florida
- Counties: Marion

Highway system
- Florida State Highway System; Interstate; US; State; Former; Pre‑1945; Toll; Scenic
← SR 483	→ SR 500

State Road 492 (SR 492) is a short state road in Ocala, Florida. It is an east-west road that runs 3.7 miles (6.0 km), is four lanes wide with provisions for center turn lanes where necessary, and serves as a connecting route between U.S. Route 27 (US 27) and eastern Ocala, Silver Springs, and the Ocala National Forest.

== Route description ==
State Road 492 begins as a continuation of Northwest 10th Street at the north end of the concurrency of US 27, US 301 and US 441. Two blocks later, the road crosses a grade crossing of a Florida Northern Railroad spur leading to the Evergreen Cemetery. At North Magnolia Avenue (County Road 464A (CR 464A)), the road turns into Northeast 10th Street, but within the block the road crosses a railroad line also owned by Florida Northern Railroad, and then Northeast Osceola Avenue before entering the "New" 14th Street Overpass, which goes over another railroad line specifically the CSX Wildwood Subdivision, part of the CSX S-Line that was used by Amtrak until 2004. This segment is the only part of the road that's divided. SR 492 runs parallel to that railroad line before the intersection of Northeast Eighth Avenue, but curves straight east again at the intersection of Northeast 10th Avenue. For the rest of the journey SR 492 is named Northeast 14th Street.

Northeast 14th Street and SR 492 both end at State Road 40, and although access is available to both directions on SR 40, only westbound traffic from SR 40 can go directly to SR 492. Eastbound traffic seeking access to SR 492 must use North 36th Avenue.

== Major intersections ==
The entire route is in Ocala, Marion County.

mi	km	Destinations	Notes
0.000	0.000	US 27 / US 301 / US 441 (North Pine Avenue / Bonnie Heath Boulevard / SR 25 / SR 200 / SR 500) – Williston, Gainesville	Westbound NW 10th Street continues to northbound US 27
3.737	6.014	SR 40 (East Silver Springs Boulevard) – Silver Springs	
1.000 mi = 1.609 km; 1.000 km = 0.621 mi

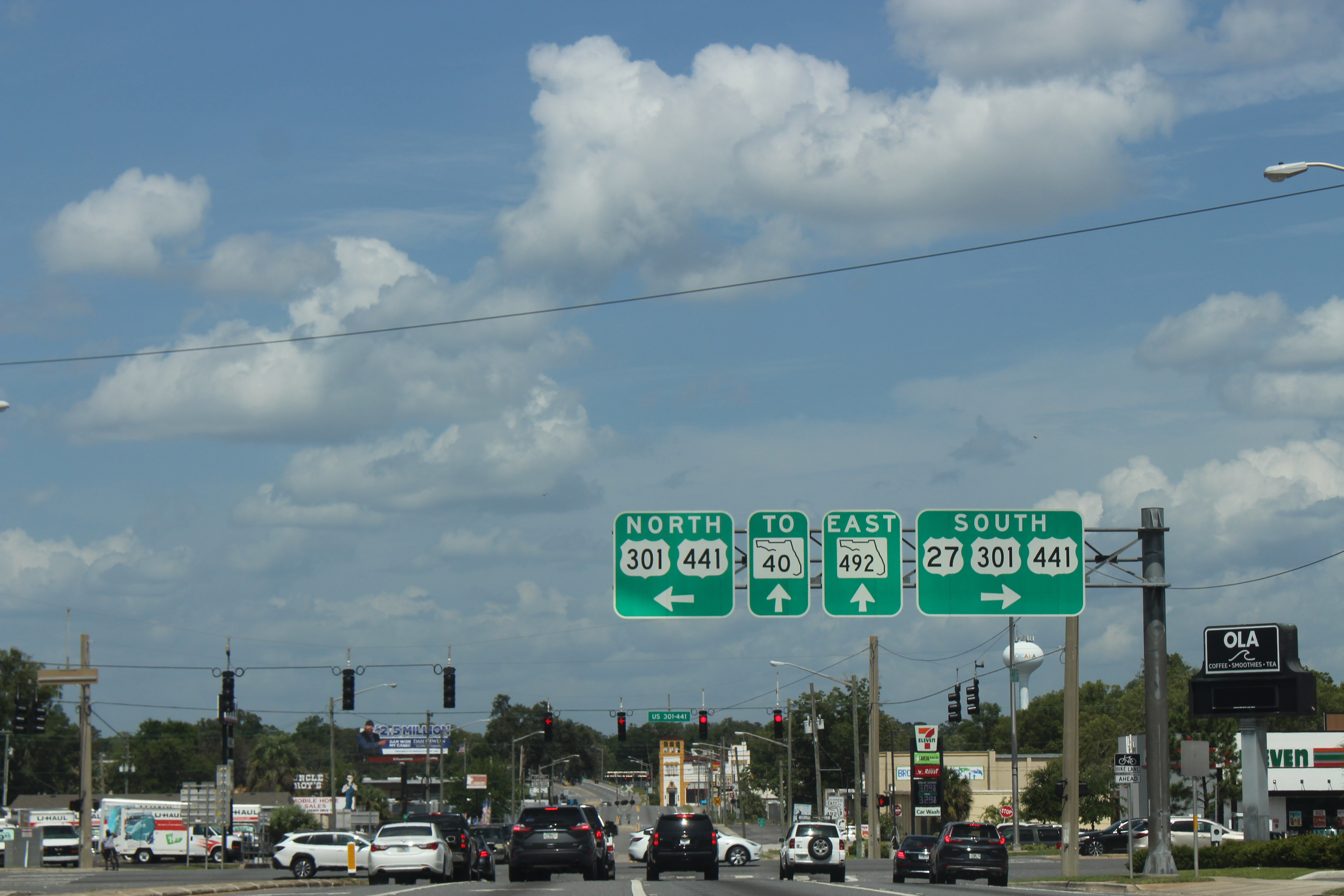
Western intersection in Ocala
