= Fellowship, Florida =

Unincorporated community in Florida, U.S.

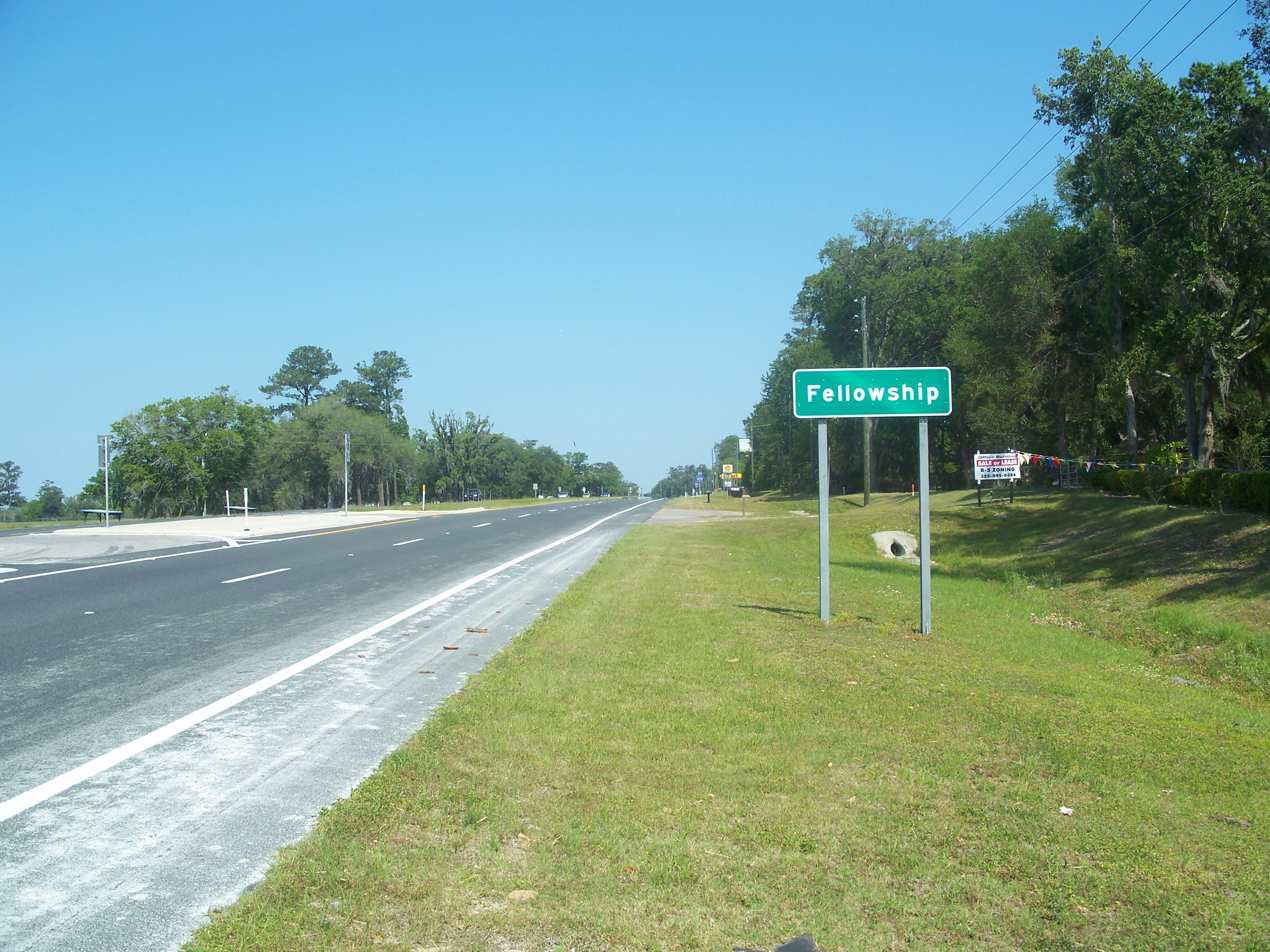
Looking west along US 27 from the southern end of Fellowship

Fellowship is an unincorporated community in Marion County, Florida, United States. It is located near the intersection of U.S. 27 and County Road 464. The community is part of the Ocala Metropolitan Statistical Area.

== Geography ==
Fellowship is located at 29°14′49″N 82°17′32″W.
