= Florida State Road 416 =

State highway in Florida, United States

State Road 416
- Silver Star Road

Route information
- Maintained by FDOT
- Length: 1.737 mi (2.795 km)
- Existed: c. 1990–present

Major junctions
- West end: SR 438 in Orlando
- East end: US 441 in Orlando

Location
- Country: United States
- State: Florida
- Counties: Orange

Highway system
- Florida State Highway System; Interstate; US; State; Former; Pre‑1945; Toll; Scenic
← SR 415	→ SR 417

State Road 416 (SR 416) is an east–west state road signed on part of Silver Star Road, in northwestern Orlando, Florida, United States.

== History ==
SR 416 was created around 1990 when SR 438 was moved from Silver Star Road to the new Princeton Street extension, and the old alignment needed a number.

== Major intersections ==
The entire route is in Orlando, Orange County.

mi	km	Destinations	Notes
0.000	0.000	SR 438 west	Silver Star Road continues west; access from SR 438 east only
1.167	1.878	SR 423 (John Young Parkway)	
1.737	2.795	US 441 (Orange Blossom Trail) / Silver Star Road east	Unsigned SR 500; continues east without designation
1.000 mi = 1.609 km; 1.000 km = 0.621 mi: Incomplete access
