= Orange Lake, Florida =

Unincorporated community in Florida

- Unincorporated community
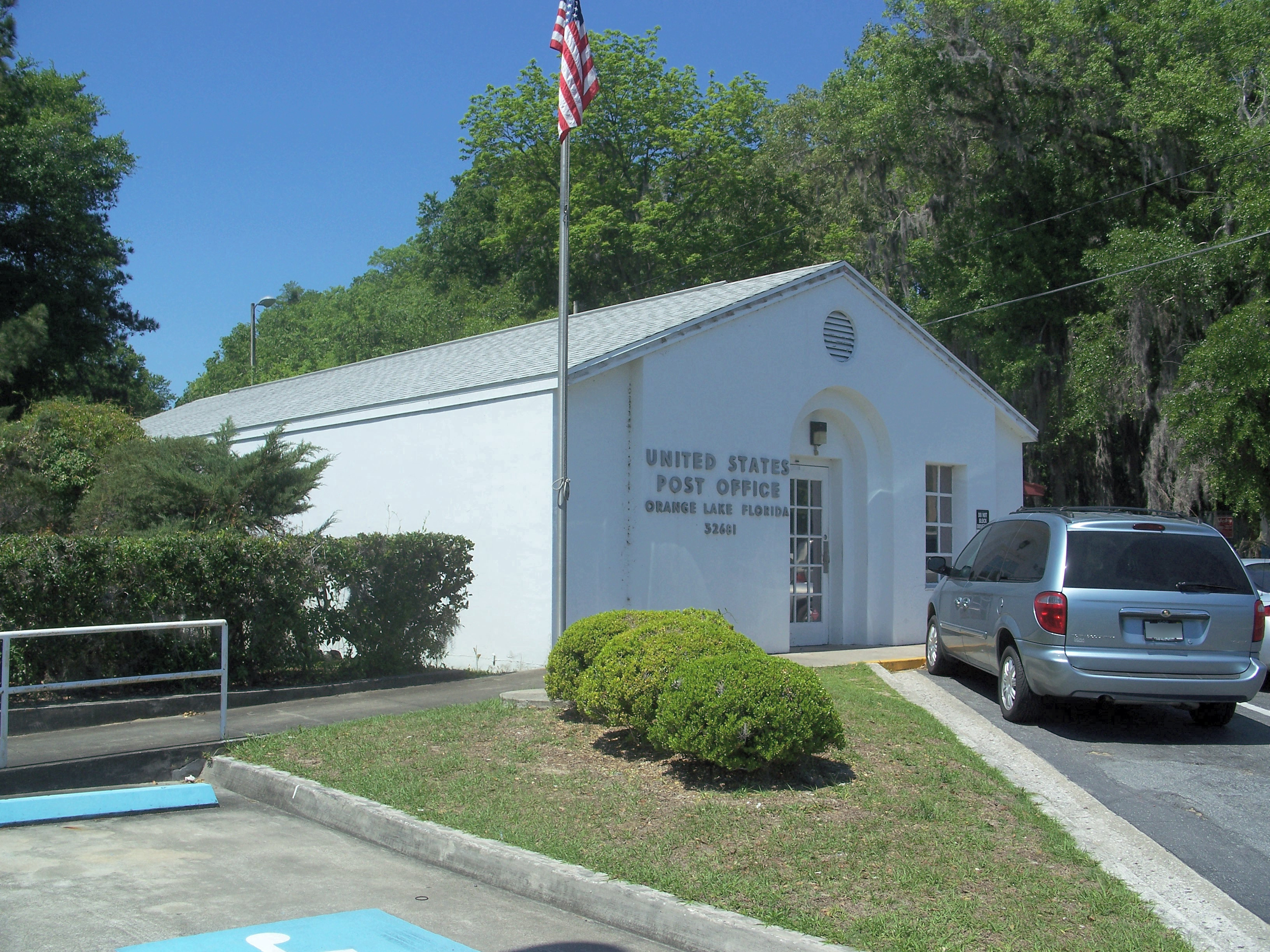
- Orange Lake’s post office
- Interactive map of Orange Lake, Florida
- Coordinates: 29°25′25″N 82°13′00″W
- Established: 1926
- Elevation: 34 m (112 ft)
- Time zone: UTC-5 (Eastern (EST))
  - Summer (DST): UTC-4 (EDT)
- Postal code: 32681

Orange Lake is an unincorporated community in Marion County, Florida, United States. It is located on US 441, on Orange Lake south of McIntosh.

Ninety-five percent of the community is located in Marion County while the remaining five percent is located in northern neighbor Alachua. The entire lake is located in Alachua County but is under the jurisdiction of Marion County Water Management.

The Marion County portion of Orange Lake is part of the Ocala Metropolitan Statistical Area, while the Alachua County portion is part of the Gainesville Metropolitan Statistical Area.

== History ==
Orange Lake was platted in 1926.
