= U.S. Route 441 =

Highway in the United States

U.S. Route 441
- US 441 highlighted in red

Route information
- Auxiliary route of US 41
- Length: 939 mi (1,511 km)
- Existed: 1926–present

Major junctions
- South end: US 41 in Miami, FL
- I-95 in North Miami Beach, FL; Florida's Turnpike in Kissimmee, FL; I-4 in Orlando, FL; I-75 in Alachua, FL; I-10 in Lake City, FL; I-16 in Dublin, GA; I-20 in Madison, GA; I-85 near Commerce, GA; US 64 near Franklin, NC; I-40 in Knoxville, TN
- North end: US 25W / SR 116 in Rocky Top, TN

Location
- Country: United States
- States: Florida, Georgia, North Carolina, Tennessee

Highway system
- United States Numbered Highway System; List; Special; Divided

U.S. Route 441 (US 441) is a 939-mile-long (1,511 km) auxiliary route of U.S. Route 41. It extends from US 41 in Miami, Florida to US 25W in Rocky Top, Tennessee. Between its termini, US 441 travels through the states of Florida, Georgia, North Carolina, and Tennessee. The highway acts as a connector between several major urban areas, including Miami, Orlando, Ocala, Gainesville, Athens, and Knoxville. It also crosses the Great Smoky Mountains National Park, where it meets the southwestern end of the Blue Ridge Parkway, and where no trucks or other commercial traffic are allowed.

== Route description ==
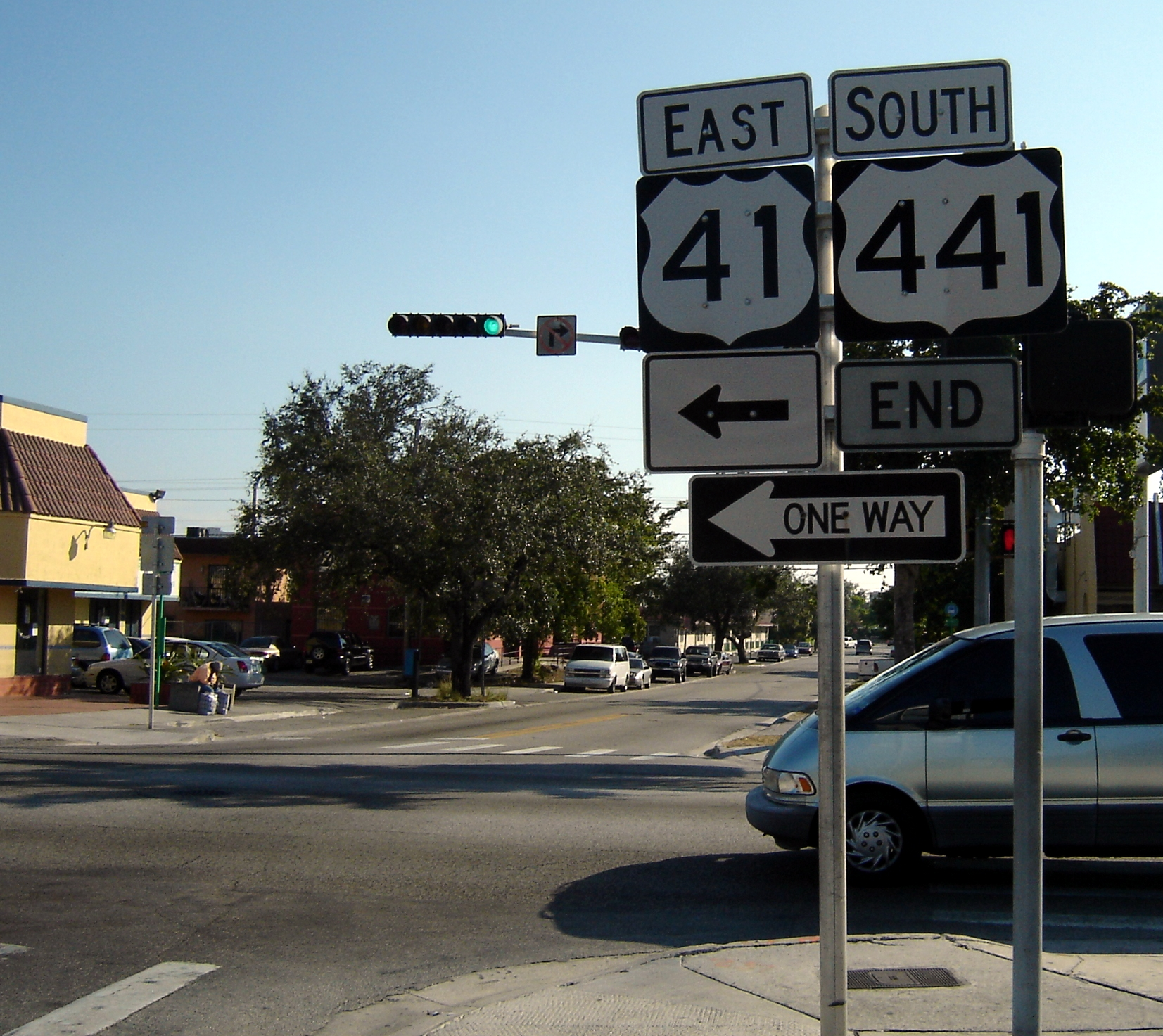
The southern terminus of US 441 in Miami

=== Florida ===
US 441 begins northbound at Southwest 7th Street, which is westbound U.S. Route 41, and ends southbound on Southwest 8th Street, which is eastbound U.S. Route 41 in the eastern "Little Havana" neighborhood of downtown Miami (both are one-way streets). 441 runs along SW/NW 8th Ave until it crosses the Miami River; then it runs along NW 7th Ave. till the Golden Glades interchange; then it runs along NW 2nd Ave. till the Miami-Dade/Broward county line. The route parallels Interstate 95 north out of Miami to western Aventura, where I-95 heads northeast to access Fort Lauderdale and the remainder of the eastern Florida coast. However, the route soon approaches the tolled Florida's Turnpike, which parallels US 441 north to West Palm Beach. In between, the route interchanges with the Turnpike at exit 62 via State Road 870 (Commercial Boulevard) in Tamarac. Additionally, US 441 meets Interstate 595 (Exits 8 and 8B) west of Fort Lauderdale and the tolled State Road 869 (the Sawgrass Expressway) in Coconut Creek.

At West Palm Beach, US 441 intersects U.S. Route 98 and overlaps the highway to central Palm Beach County, where the two routes split. US 441 continues west to the eastern shore of Lake Okeechobee, where it turns north to follow the shoreline to Pahokee. Just north of Pahokee, US 98 rejoins US 441 and remains concurrent with US 441 along the eastern edge of the lake. North of Lake Okeechobee in Okeechobee, US 98 and US 441 split for the final time. US 441 continues north, meeting the Turnpike at Yeehaw Junction (via State Road 60) prior to intersecting U.S. Route 192 at Holopaw. US 441 turns west onto US 192, forming an overlap into Kissimmee. At the concurrent routes of U.S. Route 17/92, US 441 separates from US 192 and follows US 17 / US 92 north into downtown Orlando. In downtown, US 17 / US 92 turns east onto State Road 50 while US 441 continues north on the Orange Blossom Trail. North of downtown, US 441 crosses the tolled State Road 429 and western terminus of State Road 414 in Apopka before leaving the Orlando area.

In Leesburg, midway between Orlando and Ocala, US 441 intersects U.S. Route 27. Here, the routes come together, creating a concurrency north to the Ocala suburb of Belleview, where US 27 and US 441 intersect U.S. Route 301. US 301 turns north onto US 27 / US 441, overlapping the routes into Ocala. Immediately north of downtown, US 27 separates from US 441; US 301 then departs the route north of the city. US 441 continues to the northwest, passing across Paynes Prairie Preserve State Park, through Gainesville and interchanging with Interstate 75 (Exit 399) ahead of an intersection with US 41 in High Springs. US 441 joins US 41 north to Lake City, where the routes split south of the city. The routes remain parallel, however, past U.S. Route 90 to the northern extents of Lake City.

Past Lake City, US 441 interchanges with Interstate 10 (Exit 303), then skirts the western edge of the Okefenokee Swamp as it enters Georgia.

The section from Miami to West Palm Beach is paired with mostly-unsigned State Road 7; many locals in this area generally call US 441 as "State Road 7" instead of US 441. The section from Holopaw to Ocala is paired with unsigned State Road 500. From SR 121 in Gainesville to US 90 in Lake City, it is part of the DeSoto Trail.

=== Georgia ===
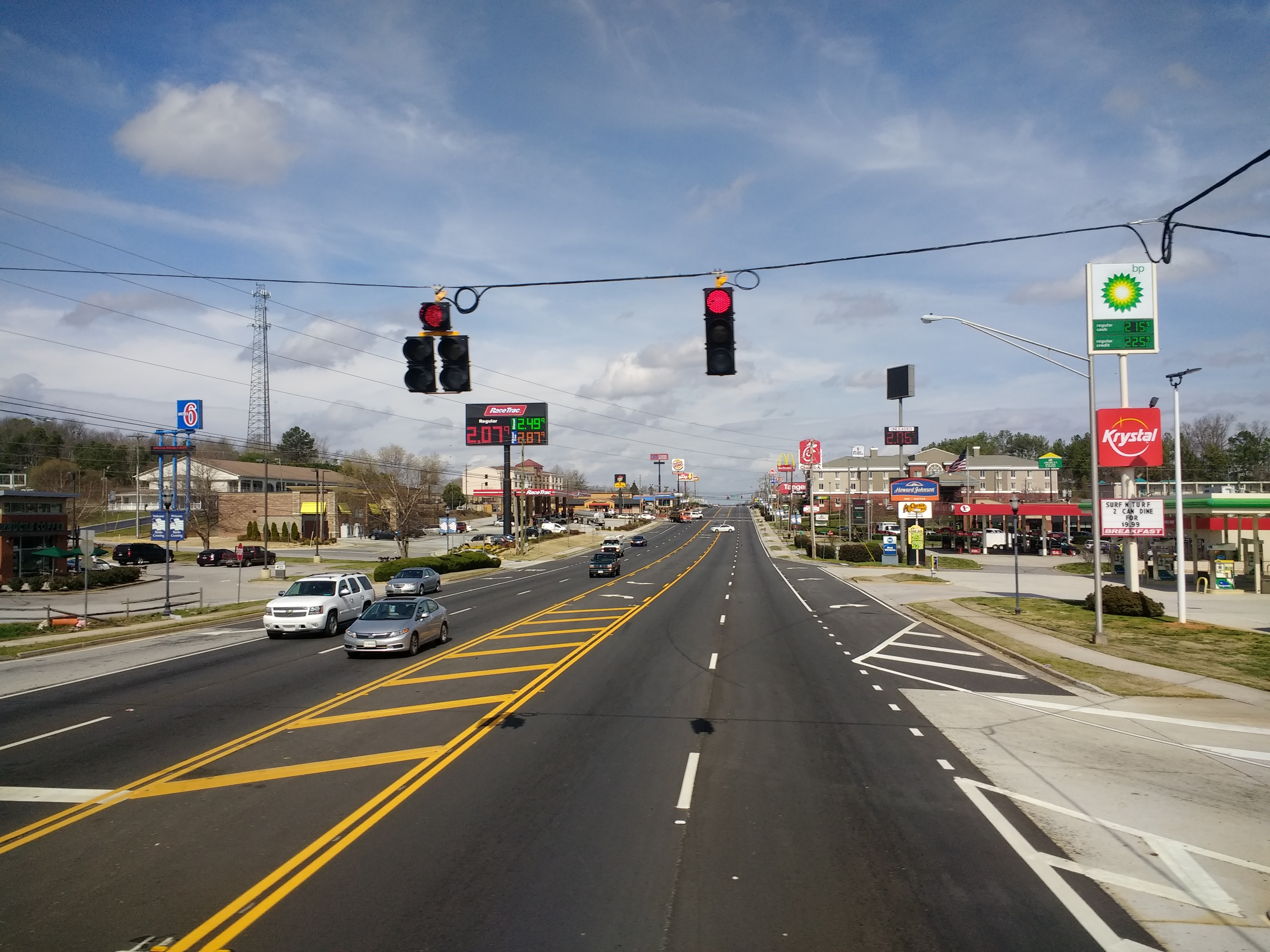
U.S. Route 441 north of Commerce, Georgia, near the interchange with Interstate 85

In Georgia, US 441 continues to bypass the Okefenokee Swamp to Edith, where it turns to the northwest toward the interior of the state. In Homerville, US 441 intersects U.S. Route 84, then meets and merges with U.S. Route 221 south of Pearson. The routes remain concurrent to Douglas, where US 221 and US 441 split. Farther north, US 441 intersects U.S. Route 319 south of Jacksonville. US 319 turns north onto US 441, creating an overlap north to McRae. US 319 and US 441 intersect U.S. Route 280, which joins the routes for a concurrent run through McRae. In the center of McRae, US 280, US 319 and US 441 meet the concurrent routes of U.S. Route 23 and U.S. Route 341. North of the city, US 280 splits off while US 319 and US 441 then pass Little Ocmulgee State Park before continuing concurrently to Dublin. Just south of Dublin, US 319 and US 441 interchange with Interstate 16. In Dublin, US 441 splits from US 319 onto a new bypass. On the bypass, US 441 intersects with U.S. Route 80.

North of Dublin, US 441 passes through Milledgeville prior to meeting U.S. Route 129 near Eatonton. US 129 and US 441 continue concurrently through Madison (where US 129 and US 441 interchange with Interstate 20) and U.S. Route 278 to Athens, where US 129 and US 441 turn eastward onto a limited-access beltway encircling the city. On the beltway, US 129 and US 441 run concurrent with U.S. Route 29 and, for a stretch, U.S. Route 78 to an interchange northeast of the city. Here, US 29 exits the highway while US 441 remains on the beltway for two more exits before departing.

The route proceeds north to Commerce, where it interchanges with Interstate 85 north of the city. Past Commerce, US 441 continues to Cornelia, where it intersects U.S. Route 23. US 441 merges with US 23, remaining concurrent with the route through Clayton (where US 23 and US 441 are concurrent with U.S. Route 76 for a short distance) into North Carolina. The portion of US 23 / US 441 from U.S. Route 123 west of Toccoa to the North Carolina state line is located within the Chattahoochee National Forest.

From the Florida state line to Pearson (in Echols, Clinch and Atkinson counties), Georgia State Route 89 is concurrent with US 441.

=== North Carolina ===
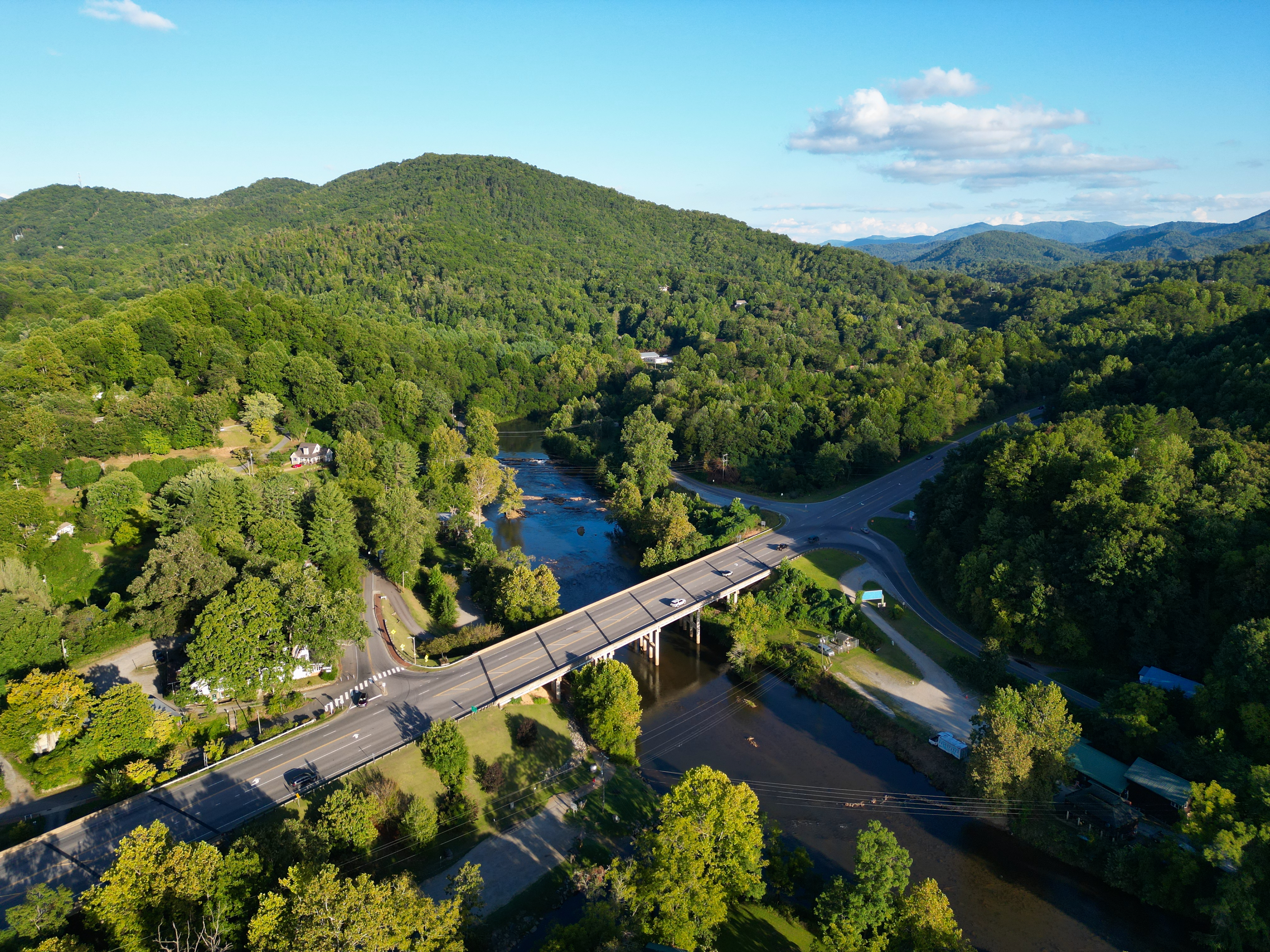
US 441 crosses the Tuckasegee River in Dillsboro, North Carolina

Upon crossing the state line, US 23 and US 441 enter the Nantahala National Forest. The concurrent routes head north through a pair of small communities before intersecting U.S. Route 64 in Franklin. US 23 and US 441 turn east, briefly overlapping US 64 around Franklin before separating from the route and continuing to the northeast through the forest. At Dillsboro, US 23 and US 441 intersect with the Smoky Mountain Expressway (U.S. Route 74), here a limited-access highway. US 23 and US 441 both merge onto the expressway, becoming concurrent with US 74; however, US 23 follows US 74 east toward Asheville while US 441 follows US 74 west. Near Whittier, US 441 ends concurrency with US 74 and continues north toward Tennessee.

US 441 heads north to Cherokee, a town located within the Eastern Cherokee Indian Reservation, where it briefly overlaps U.S. Route 19 through the town center. Past Cherokee, US 441 progresses north through the reservation to the southern extent of the Great Smoky Mountains National Park, which straddles both sides of the North Carolina-Tennessee border. From the park entrance to the Tennessee state line, the route follows a northwesterly alignment as it traverses the Great Smoky Mountains. The 31.7 mi (51.0 km) segment of the highway within the park boundary between Cherokee, North Carolina and Gatlinburg, Tennessee is maintained by the National Park Service, and is not signed as US 441.

=== Tennessee ===
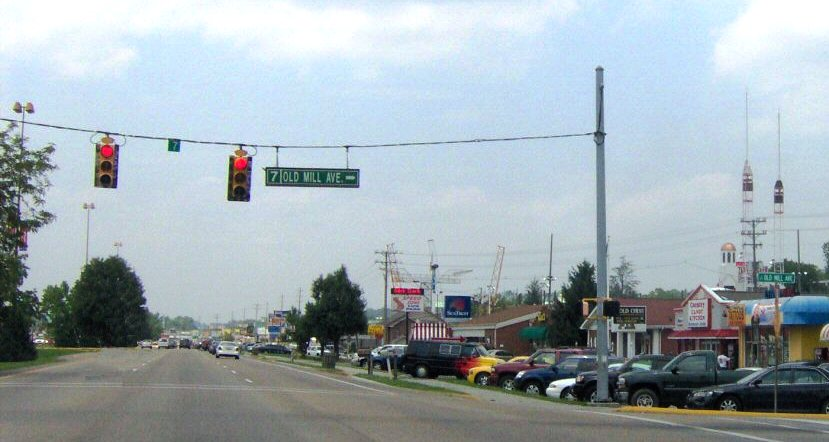
US 441 in Pigeon Forge, Tennessee

US 441 enters Tennessee at Newfound Gap. The route heads north through the Great Smoky Mountains National Park to Gatlinburg, along the Great Smoky Mountains Parkway, where the route meets U.S. Route 321. US 321 joins US 441 northward through Pigeon Forge before separating north of the city. US 441 continues north to Sevierville, where it intersects with U.S. Route 411. US 441 turns west onto US 411, following the route west to Seymour. Here, US 411 heads to the southwest towards Georgia while US 441 continues northwest to Knoxville.

Immediately south of the city, US 441 junctions with State Route 33. SR 33 merges with US 441, following the U.S. route as it enters downtown Knoxville. Within downtown, US 441 interchanges with Interstate 40 and Interstate 640 before exiting the city limits. North of the city at Halls Crossroads, SR 33 breaks from US 441 and heads northeast toward New Tazewell. US 441, meanwhile, turns northwest, paralleling Interstate 75 for a distance before crossing the top of Norris Dam and finally interchanging with the freeway at exit 128 near Rocky Top. The route then terminates at an intersection with U.S. Route 25W just west of I-75 in Rocky Top.

The route is paired with unsigned State Route 71 for most of its length in Tennessee.

== History ==
A US 441 shield used in Florida prior to 1993

US 441 was one of the original 1926 US routes. Initially it ran between Orlando and Ocala, Florida. In 1935 it was extended north to High Springs, Florida, and in 1948 to Baldwin, Georgia. The following year the southern end was moved to downtown Miami. In 1952 US 441 reached its final configuration when it was extended north from Baldwin to Rocky Top, Tennessee (then known as Lake City).

In Florida, where signs for U.S. Highways formerly had different colors for each highway (until the state was forced by the federal government to conform to standards that required consistent black-and-white signs), the shield for US 441 was brown.

In 1970 signs denoting US 441 were removed from that portion of the route which runs through the Great Smoky Mountains National Park, to discourage commercial vehicles (which are not allowed in the park).

== Major intersections ==
Florida
US 41 in Miami
US 27 in Miami
I-95 in North Miami Beach
I-595 in Davie
US 98 in Royal Palm Beach. The highways travel concurrently to Okeechobee.
US 192 in Holopaw. The highways travel concurrently to Kissimmee.
US 17 / US 92 / US 192 in Kissimmee. US 17/US 92/US 441 travels concurrently to Orlando.
Florida's Turnpike in Kissimmee
I-4 in Orlando
US 27 in Leesburg. The highways travel concurrently to Ocala.
US 301 in Belleview. The highways travel concurrently to east-northeast of Lowell.
I-75 in Alachua
US 41 in High Springs. The highways travel concurrently to south of Lake City.
I-75 in Ellisville
US 90 in Lake City
I-10 in Lake City
Georgia
US 84 in Homerville
US 221 south-southwest of Pearson. The highways travel concurrently to Douglas.
US 82 in Pearson
US 319 south-southeast of Jacksonville. The highways travel concurrently to .
US 280 in McRae. The highways travel concurrently to northeast of McRae.
US 23 / US 341 in McRae
I-16 in Dublin
US 319 in Dublin
US 80 in Dublin
US 129 in Eatonton. The highways travel concurrently to Athens.
I-20 in Madison
US 278 in Madison. The highways travel concurrently to northeast of Madison.
US 29 / US 78 in Athens. The highways travel concurrently through Athens.
I-85 north of Commerce
US 23 northwest of Cornelia. The highways travel concurrently to north-northwest of Dillsboro, North Carolina.
US 123 east-southeast of Clarkesville
US 76 in Clayton. The highways travel concurrently through Clayton.
North Carolina
US 64 in Franklin. The highways travel concurrently around the southeastern edge of Franklin.
US 23 / US 74 north-northwest of Dillsboro. US 74/US 441 travels concurrently to southeast of Whittier.
US 19 west-southwest of Cherokee. The highways travel concurrently through portions of Cherokee.
Tennessee
US 321 in Gatlinburg. The highways travel concurrently to Pigeon Forge.
US 411 in Sevierville. The highways travel concurrently to Seymour.
I-40 / I-75 / I-275 in Knoxville
I-640 / US 25W in Knoxville
I-75 in Rocky Top
US 25W in Rocky Top

== Popular culture references ==
US 441 is mentioned in the song "American Girl", by Tom Petty and the Heartbreakers. ("She could hear the cars roll by/Out on 441/Like waves crashin' on the beach") Petty is from Gainesville, Florida and US 441 travels through Gainesville and is the eastern bound of the University of Florida campus. This prompted an urban legend that stated that song was based on a suicide committed on the university campus.

US 441 is also mentioned in the song "Best of Me" by country singer Brantley Gilbert. He sings, "I remember it all too well/ Riding 441 down to Milledgeville".

US 441 is mentioned in the song titled "It's Over" by the country artist Corey Smith. He sings, "Its time to show myself the door/ There's no pretending anymore/ No, it's over/ Where I'm going I don't know/ Somewhere down this dusty road/ North on 441/ Pass the rolling cattle fields, the trailer parks, and rusted cotton mills/ Lord get me out of here." He also released a song in 2020 called "Old 441" about the highway.

== See also ==
- Special routes of U.S. Route 441

Browse numbered routes
← I-440	TN	→ SR 441
