= Broadview Park, Florida =

- CDP
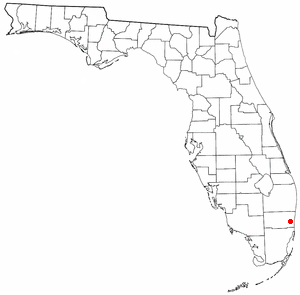
- Location of Broadview Park, Florida
- Coordinates: 26°05′52″N 80°12′32″W
- Country: United States
- State: Florida
- County: Broward

Area
  - Total: 1.05 sq mi (2.72 km^{2})
  - Land: 1.00 sq mi (2.59 km^{2})
  - Water: 0.050 sq mi (0.13 km^{2})
- Elevation: 16 ft (4.9 m)

Population (2020)
  - Total: 7,670
  - Density: 7,656.9/sq mi (2,956.36/km^{2})
- Time zone: UTC-5 (Eastern (EST))
  - Summer (DST): UTC-4 (EDT)
- ZIP code: 33317
- Area codes: 754 and 954
- FIPS code: 12-08650
- GNIS feature ID: 2402716

Broadview Park is a census-designated place (CDP) in Broward County, Florida, United States. The population was 7,670 at the 2020 census.

== Geography ==
According to the United States Census Bureau, the CDP has a total area of 1.0 square mile (2.6 km^{2}), of which 0.04 square miles (0.10 km^{2}), or 3.92%, is water.

== Demographics ==
Historical population
Census	Pop.	Note	%±
1970	6,049		—
1980	6,022		−0.4%
1990	6,109		1.4%
2000	6,798		11.3%
2010	7,125		4.8%
2020	7,670		7.6%

=== 2020 census ===
As of the 2020 census, Broadview Park had a population of 7,670. The median age was 35.7 years. 24.6% of residents were under the age of 18 and 9.9% of residents were 65 years of age or older. For every 100 females there were 113.2 males, and for every 100 females age 18 and over there were 111.5 males age 18 and over.

100.0% of residents lived in urban areas, while 0.0% lived in rural areas.

There were 2,274 households in Broadview Park, of which 45.0% had children under the age of 18 living in them. Of all households, 47.5% were married-couple households, 21.0% were households with a male householder and no spouse or partner present, and 22.7% were households with a female householder and no spouse or partner present. About 16.0% of all households were made up of individuals and 5.3% had someone living alone who was 65 years of age or older.

There were 2,348 housing units, of which 3.2% were vacant. The homeowner vacancy rate was 0.9% and the rental vacancy rate was 2.9%.

According to the 2020 American Community Survey, there were 1,975 families residing in the CDP.

Broadview Park racial composition (Hispanics excluded from racial categories) (NH = Non-Hispanic)
Race	Number	Percentage
White (NH)	1,176	15.33%
Black or African American (NH)	815	10.63%
Native American or Alaska Native (NH)	7	0.09%
Asian (NH)	199	2.59%
Pacific Islander or Native Hawaiian (NH)	2	0.03%
Some other race (NH)	63	0.82%
Two or more races/Multiracial (NH)	145	1.89%
Hispanic or Latino (any race)	5,263	68.62%
Total	7,670	100.00%

=== 2010 census ===
Broadview Park Demographics
2010 Census	Broadview Park	Broward County	Florida
Total population	7,125	1,748,066	18,801,310
Population, percent change, 2000 to 2010	+4.8%	+7.7%	+17.6%
Population density	7,345.4/sq mi	1,444.9/sq mi	350.6/sq mi
White or Caucasian (including White Hispanic)	69.7%	63.1%	75.0%
(Non-Hispanic White or Caucasian)	22.5%	43.5%	57.8%
Black or African-American	14.5%	26.7%	16.0%
Hispanic or Latino (of any race)	59.5%	25.1%	22.5%
Asian	1.9%	3.2%	2.4%
Native American or Native Alaskan	0.1%	0.3%	0.4%
Pacific Islander or Native Hawaiian	0.0%	0.1%	0.1%
Two or more races (Multiracial)	1.4%	2.9%	2.5%
Some Other Race	0.1%	3.7%	3.6%

As of the 2010 United States census, there were 7,125 people, 1,975 households, and 1,340 families residing in the CDP.

=== 2000 census ===
As of the census of 2000, there were 6,798 people, 2,122 households, and 1,606 families residing in the CDP. The population density was 6,949.1 inhabitants per square mile (2,683.1/km^{2}). There were 2,267 housing units at an average density of 2,317.4 per square mile (894.8/km^{2}). The racial makeup of the CDP was 67.92% White (37.3% were Non-Hispanic White), 16.98% African American, 0.21% Native American, 1.94% Asian, 0.49% Pacific Islander, 8.16% from other races, and 4.31% from two or more races. Hispanic or Latino of any race were 42.32% of the population.

In 2000, there were 2,122 households, out of which 41.6% had children under the age of 18 living with them, 50.5% were married couples living together, 17.6% had a female householder with no husband present, and 24.3% were non-families. 17.0% of all households were made up of individuals, and 4.5% had someone living alone who was 65 years of age or older. The average household size was 3.17 and the average family size was 3.52.

In 2000, in the CDP, the population was spread out, with 29.8% under the age of 18, 10.2% from 18 to 24, 33.6% from 25 to 44, 18.8% from 45 to 64, and 7.6% who were 65 years of age or older. The median age was 31 years. For every 100 females, there were 108.1 males. For every 100 females age 18 and over, there were 105.8 males.

In 2000, the median income for a household in the CDP was $38,125, and the median income for a family was $39,176. Males had a median income of $27,473 versus $22,296 for females. The per capita income for the CDP was $14,591. About 13.6% of families and 14.8% of the population were below the poverty line, including 18.2% of those under age 18 and 16.4% of those age 65 or over.

As of 2000, English as a first language accounted for 54.71% of all residents, and Spanish accounted for 41.80%, French Creole made up 1.57%, Tagalog was at 1.32%, and French was at 0.57% of the population.
