= Sky Lake, Florida =

Unincorporated area in Florida, US

- Census-designated place
- Location in Orange County and the state of Florida
- Coordinates: 28°27′40″N 81°23′28″W
- Country: United States
- State: Florida
- County: Orange

Area
  - Total: 1.27 sq mi (3.28 km^{2})
  - Land: 1.26 sq mi (3.27 km^{2})
  - Water: 0.0039 sq mi (0.01 km^{2})
- Elevation: 98 ft (30 m)

Population (2020)
  - Total: 7,226
  - Density: 5,728.9/sq mi (2,211.95/km^{2})
- Time zone: UTC-5 (Eastern (EST))
  - Summer (DST): UTC-4 (EDT)
- ZIP code: 32809
- Area code: 321
- FIPS code: 12-66425
- GNIS feature ID: 2402859

Sky Lake is a census-designated place (CDP) and an unincorporated area in Orange County, Florida, United States. As of the 2020 census, Sky Lake had a population of 7,226. It is part of the Orlando-Kissimmee, Florida Metropolitan Statistical Area.

== Geography ==
According to the United States Census Bureau, the CDP has a total area of 3.3 km^{2} (1.3 mi^{2}), of which 3.3 km^{2} (1.3 mi^{2}) is land and 0.79% is water.

== Demographics ==
Historical population
Census	Pop.	Note	%±
1980	6,692		—
1990	6,202		−7.3%
2000	5,651		−8.9%
2010	6,153		8.9%
2020	7,226		17.4%

=== 2020 census ===
As of the 2020 census, Sky Lake had a population of 7,226. The median age was 36.9 years. 22.9% of residents were under the age of 18 and 12.8% of residents were 65 years of age or older. For every 100 females there were 98.7 males, and for every 100 females age 18 and over there were 96.7 males age 18 and over.

100.0% of residents lived in urban areas, while 0.0% lived in rural areas.

There were 2,254 households in Sky Lake, of which 37.4% had children under the age of 18 living in them. Of all households, 41.7% were married-couple households, 19.0% were households with a male householder and no spouse or partner present, and 30.7% were households with a female householder and no spouse or partner present. About 17.3% of all households were made up of individuals and 7.2% had someone living alone who was 65 years of age or older.

There were 2,383 housing units, of which 5.4% were vacant. The homeowner vacancy rate was 0.8% and the rental vacancy rate was 8.0%.

Racial composition as of the 2020 census
Race	Number	Percent
White	2,007	27.8%
Black or African American	1,139	15.8%
American Indian and Alaska Native	93	1.3%
Asian	248	3.4%
Native Hawaiian and Other Pacific Islander	27	0.4%
Some other race	1,906	26.4%
Two or more races	1,806	25.0%
Hispanic or Latino (of any race)	4,571	63.3%

=== 2000 census ===
As of the 2000 census, there were 5,651 people, 1,955 households, and 1,468 families residing in the CDP. The population density was 1,731.6/km^{2} (4,483.8/mi^{2}). There were 2,122 housing units at an average density of 650.2/km^{2} (1,683.7/mi^{2}). The racial makeup of the CDP was 69.99% White, 12.26% African American, 0.34% Native American, 2.27% Asian, 0.74% Pacific Islander, 9.31% from other races, and 5.10% from two or more races. Hispanic or Latino of any race were 34.68% of the population.

There were 1,955 households, out of which 30.7% had children under the age of 18 living with them, 53.8% were married couples living together, 15.4% had a female householder with no husband present, and 24.9% were non-families. 18.4% of all households were made up of individuals, and 8.3% had someone living alone who was 65 years of age or older. The average household size was 2.89 and the average family size was 3.27.

In the CDP, the population was spread out, with 25.3% under the age of 18, 8.3% from 18 to 24, 28.9% from 25 to 44, 22.6% from 45 to 64, and 14.8% who were 65 years of age or older. The median age was 37 years. For every 100 females, there were 94.6 males. For every 100 females age 18 and over, there were 92.1 males.

The median income for a household in the CDP was $36,791, and the median income for a family was $41,505. Males had a median income of $24,902 versus $19,309 for females. The per capita income for the CDP was $17,727. About 10.4% of families and 12.9% of the population were below the poverty line, including 17.9% of those under age 18 and 13.4% of those age 65 or over.
