= Martin, Florida =

Unincorporated community in Florida, U.S.

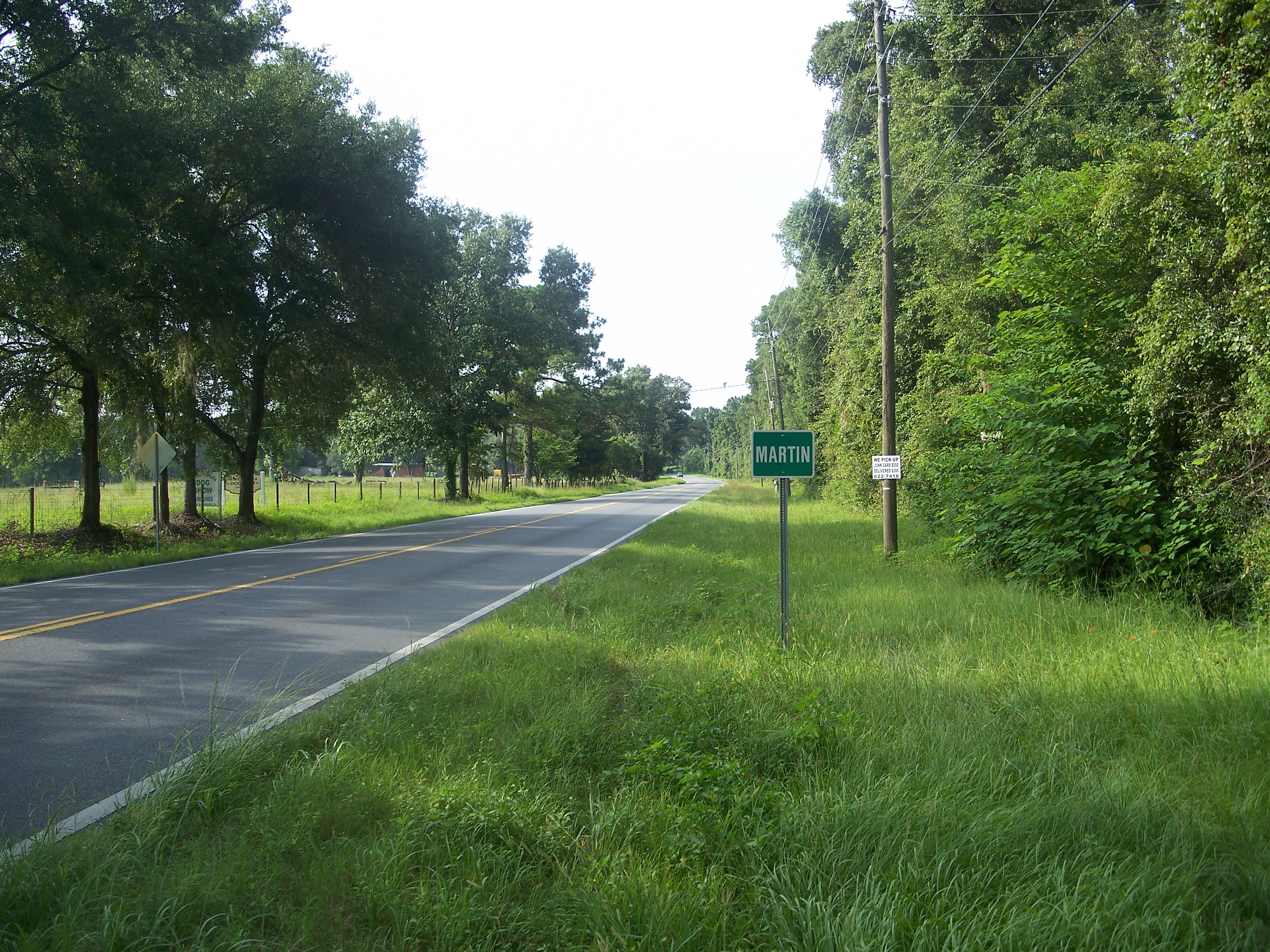
Looking south along 25A into Martin

Martin is an unincorporated community in Marion County, Florida, United States, located on County Road 25A. The community is part of the Ocala Metropolitan Statistical Area.

== Geography ==
Martin is located at 29°17′37″N 82°11′26″W (29.2936, -82.1906).
