= Florida State Road 464 =

State highway in Florida, United States

State Road 464 and County Road 464
- SR 464 in red, CR 464 and other related county roads in blue

Route information
- Maintained by FDOT
- Length: 7.213 mi (11.608 km)

Major junctions
- West end: SR 200 in Ocala
- US 27 / US 301 / US 441 in Ocala
- East end: SR 35 / CR 464 near Silver Springs Shores

Location
- Country: United States
- State: Florida
- County: Marion

Highway system
- Florida State Highway System; Interstate; US; State; Former; Pre‑1945; Toll; Scenic
← SR 463	→ SR 465

State Road 464 (SR 464) is a short state and county road (County Road 464 or CR 464) in Marion County, Florida. The road is primarily in southern Ocala, but extends outside of the city limits.

== Route description ==
SR 464 begins on the southeast side of SR 200, across from the intersection of Southwest 20th Court as Southwest 17th Street. The road runs southeast but immediately curves to the east before intersecting Southwest 19th Avenue Road. From there it continues its straight eastern trek as it approaches the newly constructed Railroad bridge over Southwest 7th Road and Avenue at the CSX Wildwood Subdivision, part of the CSX S-Line. After leveling out from the new bridge, the road intersects U.S. Routes 27 (US 27), US 301, and US 441.

At Southeast Third Avenue SR 464 becomes Southeast 17th Street, which soon enough intersects CR 464A (South Magnolia Avenue/Southeast Lake Weir Road), and then a grade-crossing with a railroad freight line. At Southeast 25th Avenue SR 464 becomes Southeast Maricamp Road and curves to the southeast, where it approaches Maricamp, Florida, the community for which the road is named. Southeast of Maricamp, SR 464 terminates at SR 35 near the Cross Florida Barge Canal, but continues southeast as CR 464 as it enters Silver Springs Shores. After leaving Silver Springs Shores, CR 464 continues on the same path until it approaches the right-of-way to an abandoned railroad line, which it runs parallel to as both enter Candler, Florida.

The name "Southeast Maricamp Road" begins to diminish as the road moves further east of Candler, and simply becomes "CR 464," especially as it veers away from the intersection of Southeast 114th Street In spite of the name and the cardinal directions, this segment of CR 464 runs straight north and south. As it approaches the northern coast of Lake Weir, County Road 464 terminates at an intersection with CR 25 at Ocklawaha, Florida.

== Major intersections ==
The entire route is in Marion County.

Location	mi	km	Destinations	Notes
Ocala	0.000	0.000	SR 200 (Southwest College Road)	
Ocala	1.232	1.983	US 27 / US 301 / US 441 (South Pine Street / SR 25 / SR 500)	
Ocala	1.931	3.108	Lake Weir Avenue / Magnolia Extension (CR 464A)	
	7.213	11.608	SR 35 (Southeast 58th Avenue) / CR 464 east	
1.000 mi = 1.609 km; 1.000 km = 0.621 mi

== Related routes ==
=== County Road 464A ===
County Road 464A
- Location: Ocala

County Road 464A (CR 464A) is a suffixed alternate route from US 27-301-441 to SR 40. It is not signed and is also internally designated by the Florida Department of Transportation as CR 4183.

=== County Road 464B ===
County Road 464B
- Location: Levy County-Fellowship

County Road 464B (CR 464B) is a suffixed alternate route of state and county roads 464, but is disconnected from both segments of the route. It begins in Levy County at SR 121 signed as Levy C-464, and terminates at US 27 in Fellowship, northwest of Ocala. Towards its midpoint, the county road has a 0.5-mile (0.80 km) concurrency with US 41.

=== County Road 464C ===
County Road 464C
- Location: Ocklawaha-Moss Bluff

County Road 464C (CR 464C) is also disconnected from both state and county roads 464. It begins near CR 25 in Ocklawaha and heads in a northeasterly direction before crossing the Ocklawaha River and ending at CR 314A in Moss Bluff.
