= Reddick, Florida =

Town in the state of Florida, United States

- Town
- Town of Reddick
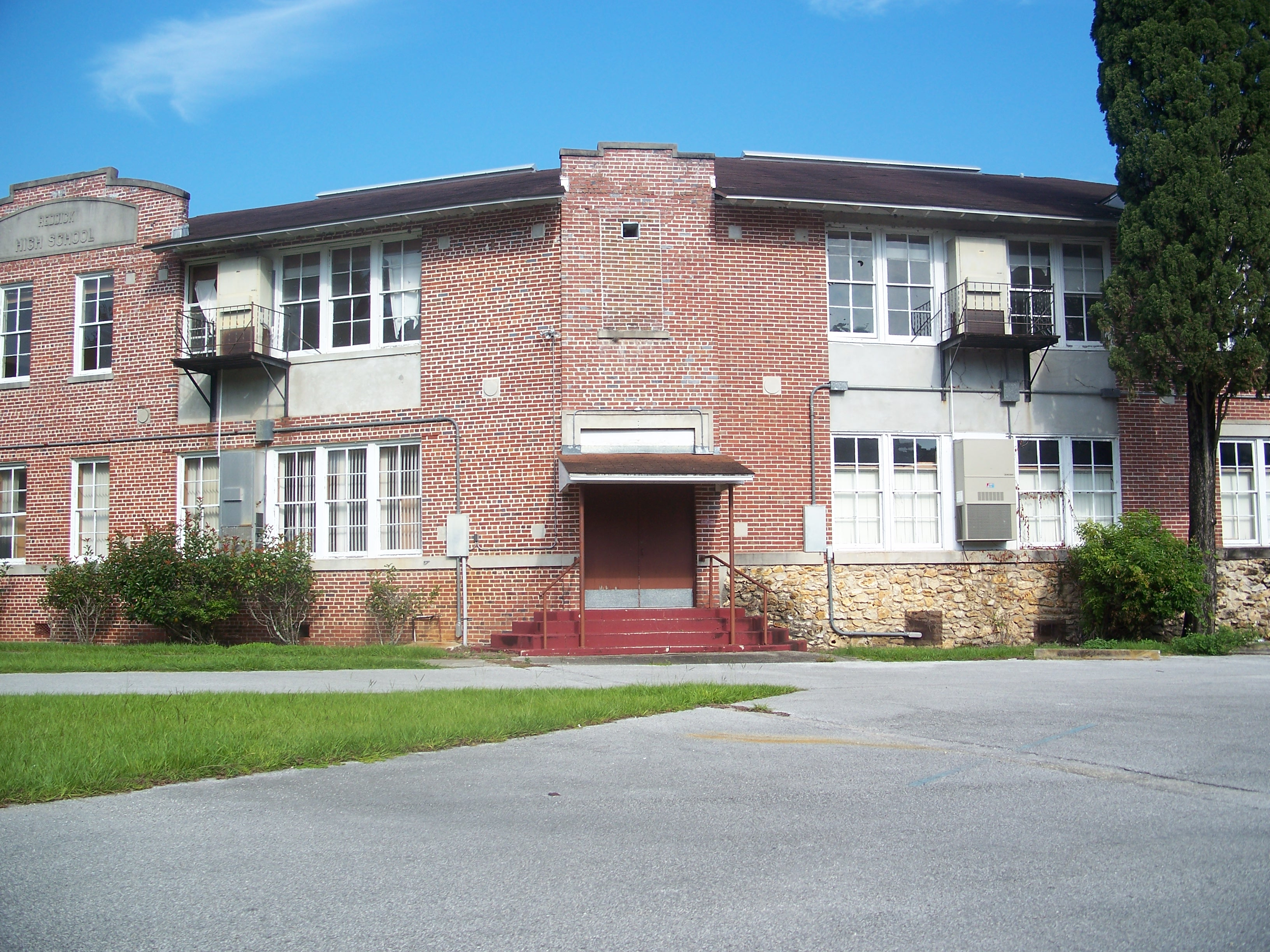
- Reddick auditorium on the grounds of the old Reddick High School

- Seal
- Motto: "God Be With Us"
- Location in Marion County and the state of Florida
- Coordinates: 29°22′19″N 82°11′51″W
- Country: United States
- State: Florida
- County: Marion
- Settled: June 8, 1882
- Incorporated: 1925

Government
  - Type: Mayor-Council
  - Mayor: John Vetter
  - Council President: Nadine Stokes
  - Councilors: Andrea Barnes, Shirley Youmans, Myra Sherman, and Council Pro Tem; Patti Vetter
  - Town Clerk: Teresa J. Sweetalla
  - Town Attorney: H. Randolph Klein

Area
  - Total: 1.26 sq mi (3.26 km^{2})
  - Land: 1.26 sq mi (3.26 km^{2})
  - Water: 0 sq mi (0.00 km^{2})
- Elevation: 72 ft (22 m)

Population (2020)
  - Total: 449
  - Density: 356/sq mi (137.6/km^{2})
- Time zone: UTC-5 (Eastern (EST))
  - Summer (DST): UTC-4 (EDT)
- ZIP code: 32686
- Area code: 352
- FIPS code: 12-59675
- GNIS feature ID: 2407188
- Website: www.townofreddick.com

Reddick is a town in Marion County, Florida, United States. It is part of the Ocala Metropolitan Statistical Area. As of the 2020 US census, the town population was 449, down from 506 in 2010 US census.

== History ==
The town was platted and founded on June 8, 1882, and the local post office has also been in operation at Reddick since 1882. John Reddick, the first postmaster, gave the community his last name. The Town of Reddick was officially incorporated as a municipality in 1925.

In 1998, a group of nuns formed the Annunciation of the Theotokos Monastery with the approval of Greek Orthodox Archdiocese of America.

The film Jeepers Creepers was shot in Reddick during the summer of 2000. The old Reddick High School was used as the police station in the film.

== Geography ==
The Town of Reddick is located in northern Marion County 15 miles (24 km) north of Ocala, the county seat.

According to the United States Census Bureau, the town has a total area of 1.3 square miles (3.4 km^{2}), all land.

=== Climate ===
The climate in this area is characterized by hot, humid summers and generally mild winters. According to the Köppen climate classification, the Town of Reddick has a humid subtropical climate zone (Cfa).

== Demographics ==
Historical population
Census	Pop.	Note	%±
1910	498		—
1920	312		−37.3%
1930	363		16.3%
1940	392		8.0%
1950	433		10.5%
1960	594		37.2%
1970	305		−48.7%
1980	657		115.4%
1990	554		−15.7%
2000	571		3.1%
2010	506		−11.4%
2020	449		−11.3%
U.S. Decennial Census

=== Racial and ethnic composition ===
Reddick town, Florida – Racial and ethnic composition Note: the US Census treats Hispanic/Latino as an ethnic category. This table excludes Latinos from the racial categories and assigns them to a separate category. Hispanics/Latinos may be of any race.
Race / Ethnicity (NH = Non-Hispanic)	Pop 2000	Pop 2010	Pop 2020	% 2000	% 2010	% 2020
White alone (NH)	290	209	191	50.79%	41.30%	42.54%
Black or African American alone (NH)	239	246	194	41.86%	48.62%	43.21%
Native American or Alaska Native alone (NH)	0	1	1	0.00%	0.20%	0.22%
Asian alone (NH)	0	1	5	0.00%	0.20%	1.11%
Native Hawaiian or Pacific Islander alone (NH)	1	0	1	0.18%	0.00%	0.22%
Other race alone (NH)	0	0	0	0.00%	0.00%	0.00%
Mixed race or Multiracial (NH)	3	4	14	0.53%	0.79%	3.12%
Hispanic or Latino (any race)	38	45	43	6.65%	8.89%	9.58%
Total	571	506	449	100.00%	100.00%	100.00%

=== 2020 census ===
As of the 2020 United States census, there were 449 people, 215 households, and 121 families residing in the town.

=== 2010 census ===
As of the 2010 United States census, there were 506 people, 174 households, and 92 families residing in the town.

=== 2000 census ===
At the 2000 census there were 571 people, 203 households, and 146 families in the town. The population density was 458.7 inhabitants per square mile (177.1/km^{2}). There were 236 housing units at an average density of 189.6 per square mile (73.2/km^{2}). The racial makeup of the town was 52.19% White, 42.21% African American, 0.18% Pacific Islander, 3.15% from other races, and 2.28% from two or more races. Hispanic or Latino of any race were 6.65%.

Of the 203 households in 2000, 33.5% had children under the age of 18 living with them, 46.8% were married couples living together, 16.3% had a female householder with no husband present, and 27.6% were non-families. 24.6% of households were one person and 14.8% were one person aged 65 or older. The average household size was 2.81 and the average family size was 3.31.

The age distribution in 2000 was 32.0% under the age of 18, 8.2% from 18 to 24, 24.7% from 25 to 44, 21.7% from 45 to 64, and 13.3% 65 or older. The median age was 34 years. For every 100 females, there were 96.2 males. For every 100 females age 18 and over, there were 95.0 males.

In 2000, the median household income was $33,875 and the median family income was $36,944. Males had a median income of $22,143 versus $15,833 for females. The per capita income for the town was $13,338. About 10.6% of families and 18.3% of the population were below the poverty line, including 16.7% of those under age 18 and 16.7% of those age 65 or over.

== See also ==
- List of towns in Florida
