= Lowell, Florida =

Unincorporated community in Florida, U.S.

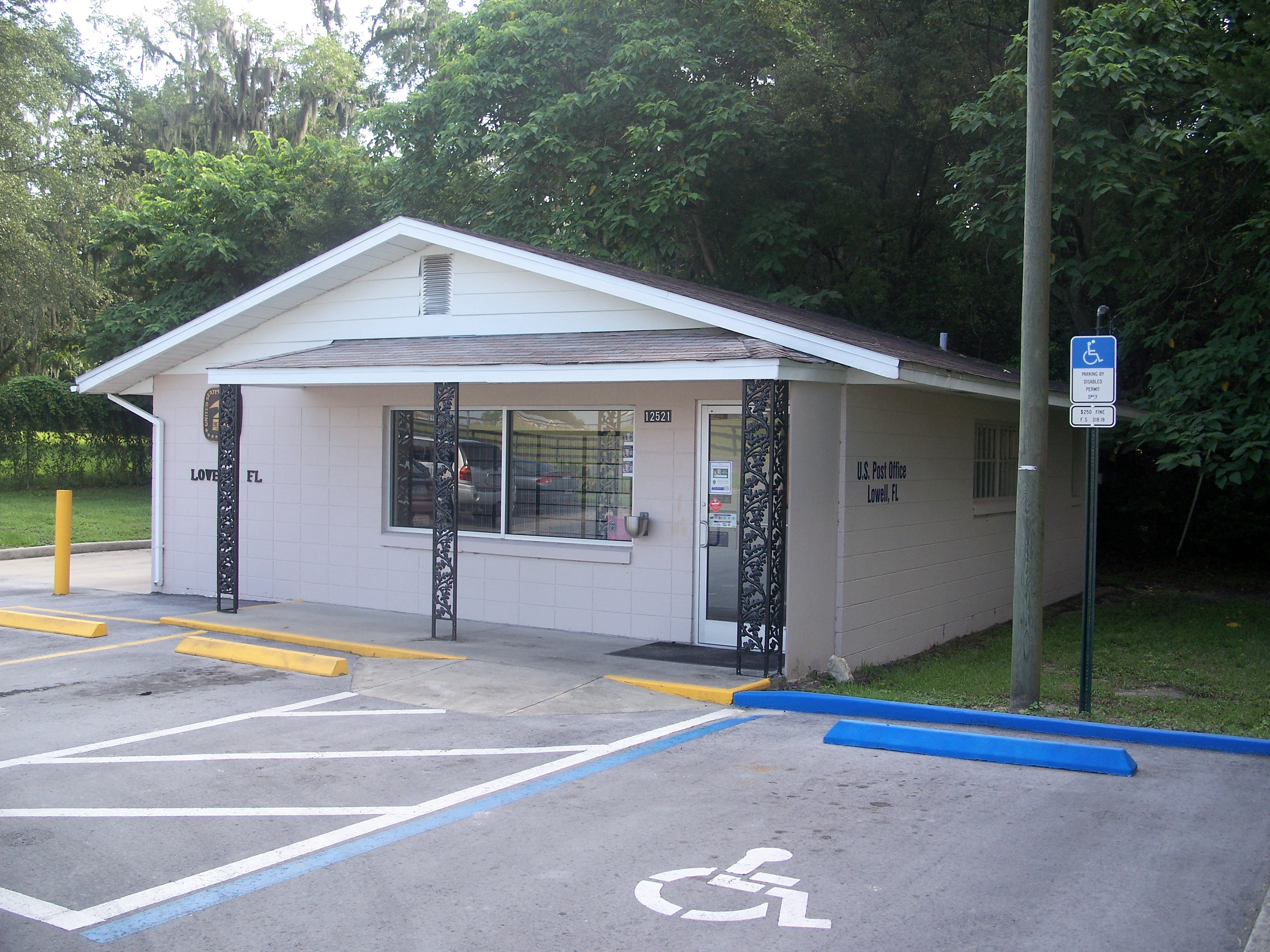
Lowell post office

Lowell is an unincorporated community in Marion County, Florida, United States, located near the intersection of County Road 329 and County Road 25A. The community is part of the Ocala Metropolitan Statistical Area.

The United States Postal Service operates the Lowell Post Office. The Lowell post office has been in operation since 1888. The community was probably named after Lowell, Massachusetts. The ZIP Code for Lowell is 32663.

== Geography ==
Lowell is located at 29°19′49″N 82°11′30″W (29.3303, -82.1917).

== Government and infrastructure ==
The Florida Department of Corrections operates the Lowell Correctional Institution.
