= National Register of Historic Places listings in Columbia County, Florida =

Location of Columbia County in Florida

This is a list of the National Register of Historic Places listings in Columbia County, Florida.

This is intended to be a complete list of the properties and districts on the National Register of Historic Places in Columbia County, Florida, United States. The locations of National Register properties and districts for which the latitude and longitude coordinates are included below, may be seen in a map.

There are 13 properties and districts listed on the National Register in the county.

This National Park Service list is complete through NPS recent listings posted September 11, 2026.

Contents: Counties in Florida (non-linked contain no National Register listings)
Alachua - Baker - Bay - Bradford - Brevard - Broward - Calhoun - Charlotte - Citrus - Clay - Collier - Columbia - DeSoto - Dixie - Duval - Escambia - Flagler - Franklin - Gadsden - Gilchrist - Glades - Gulf - Hamilton - Hardee - Hendry - Hernando - Highlands - Hillsborough (Tampa) - Holmes - Indian River - Jackson - Jefferson - Lafayette - Lake - Lee - Leon - Levy - Liberty - Madison - Manatee - Marion - Martin - Miami-Dade (Miami) - Monroe - Nassau - Okaloosa - Okeechobee - Orange - Osceola - Palm Beach - Pasco - Pinellas - Polk - Putnam - St. Johns - St. Lucie - Santa Rosa - Sarasota - Seminole - Sumter - Suwannee - Taylor - Union - Volusia - Wakulla - Walton - Washington

== Current listings ==
	Name on the Register	Image	Date listed	Location	City or town	Description
1	Columbia County High School	Columbia County High School	November 15, 1993 (#93001154)	372 West Duval Street; 30°11′20″N 82°38′27″W	Lake City	Part of the Lake City MPS
2	Horace Duncan House	Horace Duncan House	November 15, 1993 (#93001155)	202 West Duval Street; 30°11′19″N 82°38′20″W	Lake City	Part of the Lake City MPS
3	Falling Creek Methodist Church and Cemetery	Falling Creek Methodist Church and Cemetery	April 4, 1996 (#96000359)	State Road 131, 6 miles northwest of Lake City; 30°15′32″N 82°39′52″W	Lake City	
4	Fort White Depot	Fort White Depot	September 9, 2026 (#100013395)	108 Southwest Walker's Way; 29°55′23″N 82°42′58″W	Fort White	
5	Fort White Public School Historic District	Fort White Public School Historic District	December 1, 1989 (#89002061)	East Dorch at North Bryant Street; 29°55′32″N 82°42′45″W	Fort White	
6	Goodbread-Black Farm Historic District		April 1, 1999 (#99000409)	Off Corinth Road, south of the Suwannee River, east of U.S. Route 41, and west of U.S. Route 441; 30°18′46″N 82°39′03″W	Lake City	On private property and gated
7	T. G. Henderson House	T. G. Henderson House	July 24, 1973 (#73000571)	207 South Marion Street; 30°11′15″N 82°38′14″W	Lake City	
8	Hotel Blanche	Hotel Blanche	January 18, 1990 (#89002320)	212 North Marion Street; 30°11′27″N 82°38′16″W	Lake City	
9	Lake City Historic Commercial District	Lake City Historic Commercial District	June 6, 1994 (#93001157)	Roughly bounded by Railroad, North Hernando, Duval, and North Columbia Streets; 30°11′32″N 82°38′14″W	Lake City	Part of the Lake City MPS
10	Lake Isabella Historic Residential District	Lake Isabella Historic Residential District	November 15, 1993 (#93001156)	Roughly bounded by East, Duval, and Columbia Streets, Baya Avenue, Church Street, and Lake Isabella; 30°11′09″N 82°38′04″W	Lake City	Part of the Lake City MPS
11	McKeithen Archaeological Site		September 14, 2020 (#100005551)	Address Restricted	Wellborn vicinity	
12	O'Leno State Park	O'Leno State Park	June 9, 2014 (#14000282)	410 SE. O'Leno Park Rd. 29°55′18″N 82°36′31″W	High Springs	
13	Sikes House	Sikes House	February 1, 2007 (#06001318)	288 Ellis Street, just south of U.S. Route 27; 29°55′21″N 82°42′48″W	Fort White	

== See also ==
- List of National Historic Landmarks in Florida
- National Register of Historic Places listings in Florida
