= Kendyll Pope =

American football player (born 1981)

No. 55
- Position: Linebacker

Personal information
- Born: May 9, 1981 (age 45); Fort White, Florida, U.S.
- Listed height: 6 ft 1 in (1.85 m)
- Listed weight: 220 lb (100 kg)

Career information
- High school: Columbia (Lake City, Florida)
- College: Florida State
- NFL draft: 2004: 4th round, 107th overall pick

Career history
- Indianapolis Colts (2004–2006)

Awards and highlights
- Super Bowl champion (XLI); Second-team All-ACC (2002)
- Stats at Pro Football Reference

Kendyll Pope (born May 9, 1981) is an American former professional football player who was a linebacker for the Indianapolis Colts. He played college football for the Florida State Seminoles.

== Early life ==
A native of Fort White, Florida, Pope attended Columbia High School, where he developed into one of the best defensive players in the state of Florida. In his senior year, he recorded 175 tackles, seven sacks and four caused fumbles, which earned him first-team Class 6A all-state honors, as well as All-American selections by USA Today and Parade.

Ranked as the No. 5 linebacker in the country by SuperPrep, Pope was recruited by numerous schools. He selected Florida State over Florida, Alabama, Tennessee, and Ohio State, following the footsteps of former Seminoles and Columbia alumni Brian Allen and All-American Reinard Wilson.

== College career ==
In his true freshman year at Florida State, Pope primarily saw action backing up All-American senior Tommy Polley at weakside linebacker as well as on special teams. Pope finished the season with 52 tackles (20 solo), which was best among non-starters. His season high of eight tackles (four solo, four assists) came against Virginia.

As a sophomore, Pope succeeded Polley at the weakside linebacker spot, starting every regular season game for the Seminoles, but a shoulder injury caused him to miss the Seminoles' victory over Virginia Tech in the Gator Bowl. He recorded 113 tackles (52 unassisted) in the season, which trailed only senior Bradley Jennings (121), and was the most by a Seminole sophomore since Marvin Jones (125) in 1991. Pope also ranked fourth on the team with seven tackles for a loss of (−28 yards). He had a season-high 14 tackles against Wake Forest and Clemson. For his sophomore performance, Pope earned an All-ACC honorable mention.

In his junior season, Pope led the team with 131 total tackles (68 solo), and recorded 10 or more tackles in eight of the Seminoles' 14 games, including five of the last six games of the season. A career-high 15 tackles came against North Carolina State. For the season, Pope also had five pass break-ups, five quarterback hurries and two interceptions, including a pick six in the 31–14 win over in-state rival Florida. Pope was named to the All-ACC second-team, and was voted No. 2 on Kirk Herbstreit's “Best of the Best Outside Linebacker” along with teammate Michael Boulware.

Pope entered the 2003 season with the expectations of an All-American senior year, but was plagued with knee injuries throughout the season. Rotating with sophomore A. J. Nicholson and freshman Ernie Sims, and seeing his playing time reduced, Pope's numbers went considerably down. Playing in 10 games, he recorded 56 tackles, seven tackles for a loss, and three quarterback sacks.

== Professional career ==
Projected to be a mid-third rounder by Sports Illustrated, Pope was described as “athletic, weak-side linebacker that excels in pass coverage.” He was selected in the fourth round with the 107th overall pick by the Colts.

Pope missed the 2005 NFL season after being suspended for violating the NFL's Substance Abuse Policy. He was waived by the Colts on April 25, 2007, after missing two seasons due to suspension and never being reinstated.
