= White High School =

White High School may refer to:

- Edward Douglas White Catholic High School, Thibodaux, Louisiana
- Edward H. White High School, Jacksonville, Florida
- Fort White High School, Fort White, Florida
- W. T. White High School, Dallas, Texas
