= Fort White High School =

High school in Columbia County, Florida

Coordinates: 29.9306°N 82.7113°W

Location
- 17828 Southwest State Road 47; Fort White, (Columbia County), Florida 32038; United States

Information
- Type: Public high school
- Established: 2000
- School district: Columbia County School District
- Principal: Jonathan Jordan
- Staff: 65.00 (FTE)
- Enrollment: 1,117 (2023-2024)
- Student to teacher ratio: 17.18
- Colors: Black, red and white
- Nickname: Indians

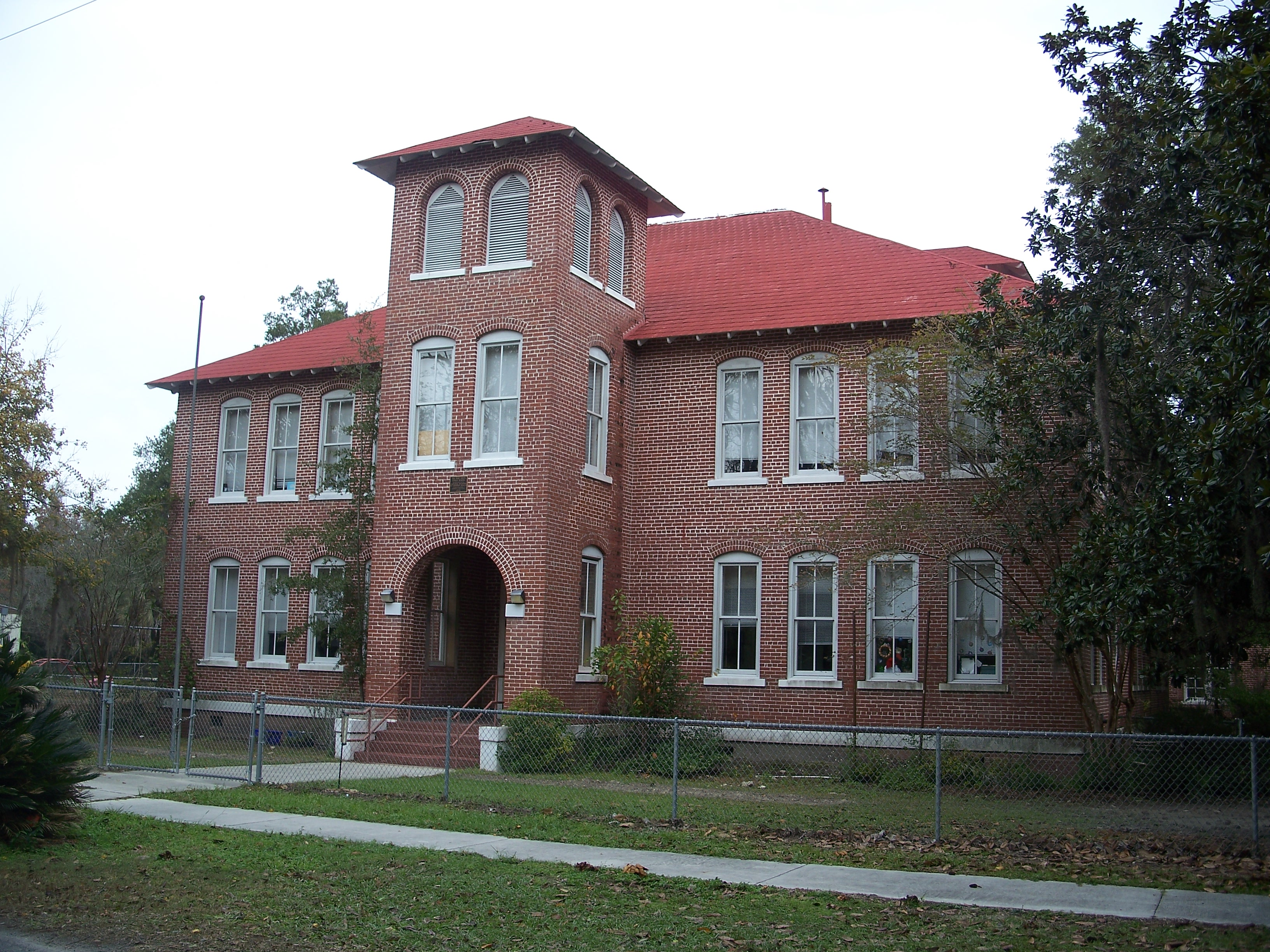
Original Fort White School building, part of the Fort White Public School Historic District

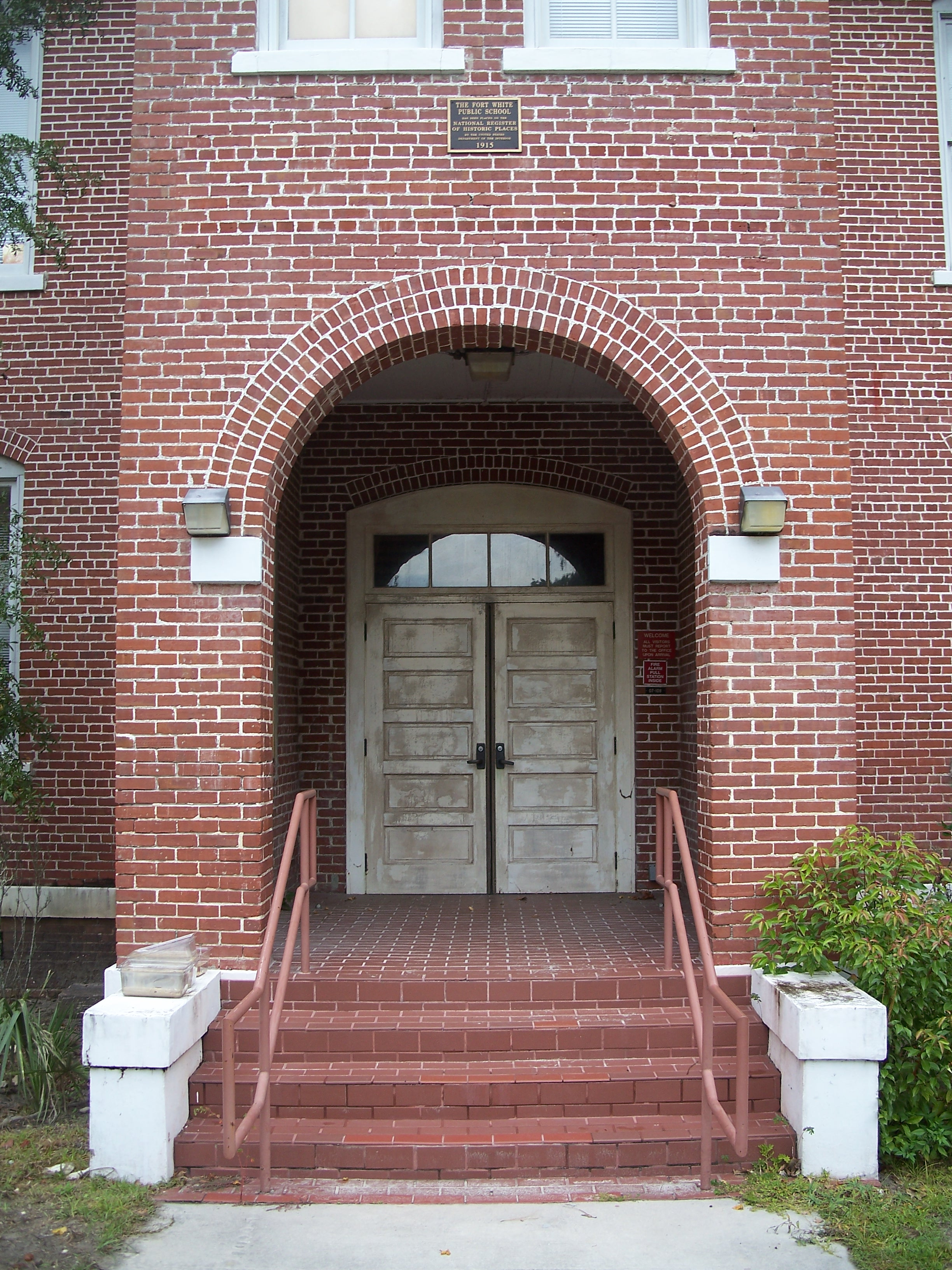
Entryway to original Fort White High School with National Register plaque above it

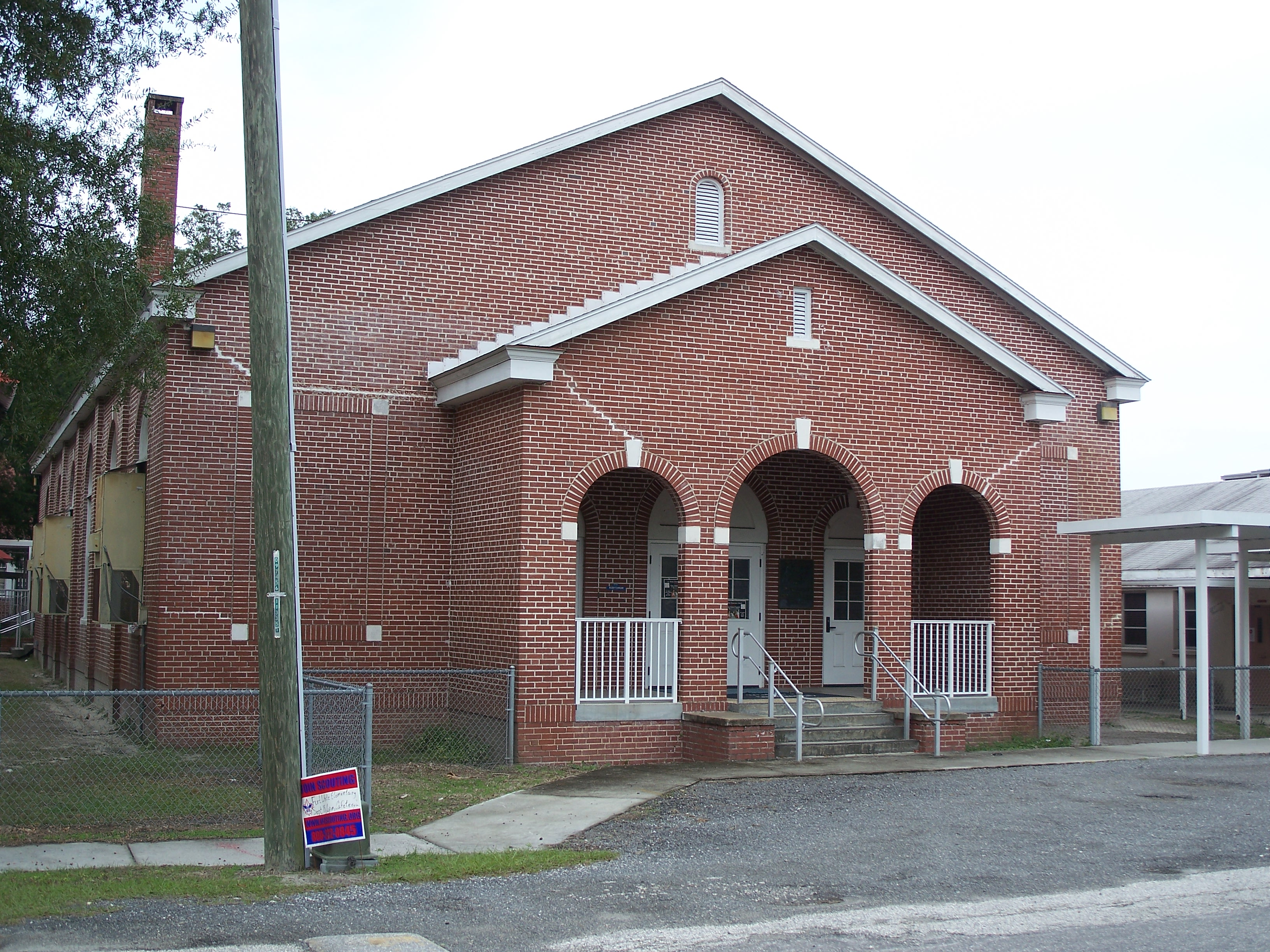
Fort White Public School Auditorium at the original Fort White High School

Fort White High School is located at 17828 SW SR47 in Fort White, Florida. It is part of the Columbia County School District in Columbia County, Florida. The high school opened in a new building in 2000, 30 years after the original Fort White High School closed. The original school and auditorium buildings are part of the Fort White Public School Historic District, listed on the National Register of Historic Places

== History ==
The original Fort White High School is part of the Fort White Public School Historic District. It was constructed during 1915 in the masonry vernacular. The building included an Italianate tower and an auditorium was added in 1936. Separate elementary school classrooms were completed in 1938.

The last high school graduating class at the original high school was in 1969, about the same time desegregation and integration forced the closing of the schools serving black students in the area. There were not enough children to justify a high school in Fort White, so students in grades 9–12 were bused 20 miles (32 km) to Columbia High School in Lake City for the next 30 years. After the Ichetucknee Springs State Park opened in 1971, the population in the south end of the county grew to the point where the need for a local facility developed.

=== New high school ===
A $25 million high school was completed in December 2000 for grades 6–12. It opened in August 2000 in temporary buildings because of construction delays. Fort White High School graduated the first class at the new school in 2001. A new Fort White Middle School for grade 6 was completed prior to the 2008–09 school year. The rest of the middle school (for grades 7 and 8) has also been completed with the middle and high school joined.
