= Lassie Goodbread-Black =

Lassie Goodbread Black
- Born: August 24, 1904; Lake City, Florida
- Died: May 11, 1996 (aged 91); Lake City, Florida
- Education: University of Florida; Emory University
- Known for: Being the first woman to enroll at the University of Florida
- Spouse: A.K. Black

Lassie Moore Goodbread was an American farmer and educator who, in 1925, became the first woman to enroll at the University of Florida in the College of Agriculture. In 2000, Goodbread was named a Great Floridian by the State of Florida.

== Background ==
Goodbread was born in Lake City, Florida, on August 24, 1904. She attended Columbia High School and graduated in 1921. She grew up on a farm in the northern part of Columbia County and was interested in agriculture, but it was not offered when she attended the Florida State College for Women in Tallahassee. At the time, the University of Florida (UF) did not admit women. However, in 1924, the Florida Legislature ruled that women of a "mature age" (at least 21 years old), who had completed 60 semester hours from a "reputable educational institution", could enroll during regular semesters at UF in programs that were unavailable at Florida State College for Women. Before this, only the summer semester was coeducational to accommodate teachers.

== Accomplishments ==
Goodbread later received a Master's of Education degree from Emory University in Atlanta. She became a Columbia County home demonstration agent, teaching modern agricultural and canning methods. She helped establish the Lake City recreation council, which eventually became the recreation department and was instrumental in forming the Lake City Garden Club.

== Marriage ==
Goodbread married Arthur Keith Black on June 20, 1925, and both attended UF. They remained married for over 70 years. Black was named to the University of Florida Hall of Fame in 1925 and graduated from Law School and was admitted to the Florida Bar in May, 1929. He lived in Lake City and practiced law for nearly 70 years, until his death on May 22, 1999.

== Honors ==
Goodbread was named Mother of the Year by the State of Florida and, in 1984, the Lake City Chamber of Commerce honored her for 50 years of community service. She was named a Great Floridian by the State of Florida in 2000. Her Great Floridian plaque is located at the Lake City Garden Club on Hernando Street in Lake City.

== Century Pioneer ==
Goodbread was the certified family member of the Century Pioneer Family Farm Program, established by the state of Florida in 1985 to honor families who have maintained at least 100 years of continuous family farm ownership.

Subsequently, the Goodbread-Black farm was designated as an historic district and was added to the National Register of Historic Places in 1999. The Goodbread-Black Farm Historic District is register entry #99000409.

She died on May 11, 1996, at age 91.
