= Laremy Tunsil =

American football player (born 1994)

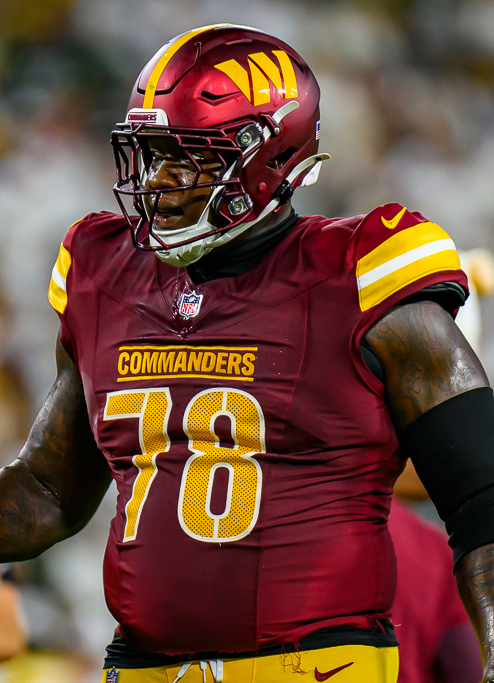
- Tunsil with the Washington Commanders in 2025

No. 78 – Washington Commanders
- Position: Offensive tackle
- Roster status: Injured reserve

Personal information
- Born: August 2, 1994 (age 32); Harvey, Louisiana, U.S.
- Listed height: 6 ft 5 in (1.96 m)
- Listed weight: 313 lb (142 kg)

Career information
- High school: Columbia (Lake City, Florida)
- College: Ole Miss (2013–2015)
- NFL draft: 2016: 1st round, 13th overall pick

Career history
- Miami Dolphins (2016–2018); Houston Texans (2019–2024); Washington Commanders (2025–present)

Awards and highlights
- 5× Pro Bowl (2019, 2020, 2022–2024); PFWA All-Rookie Team (2016); 2× First-team All-SEC (2014, 2015); Second-team All-SEC (2013)

Career NFL statistics as of 2025
- Games played: 139
- Games started: 139
- Stats at Pro Football Reference

Laremy Alexander Tunsil (born August 2, 1994) is an American professional football offensive tackle for the Washington Commanders of the National Football League (NFL). He played college football for the Ole Miss Rebels and was selected by the Miami Dolphins in the first round of the 2016 NFL draft. Tunsil was traded to the Houston Texans in 2019, making five Pro Bowls with them before being traded to the Commanders in 2025.

== Early life ==
Tunsil was born on August 2, 1994, in Harvey, Louisiana. He grew up in Lake City, Florida, attending Columbia High School where he played football and competed in track and field as a shot putter. He was a two-time All-State offensive lineman for the Tigers football team. Tunsil credits his development as an offensive tackle to going up against defensive lineman Timmy Jernigan, his Columbia teammate, in practice. "He's always trying to get better every day. He's strong and he's fundamentally sound. He's got all the tools you need to be one of the best," said his high school coach Brian Allen. In his senior year, Tunsil helped Columbia High School rush for 275 yards per game en route to the FHSAA Class 6A state quarterfinals, where they lost 28–21 to Navarre High School. After the season, Tunsil played in the 2013 U.S. Army All-American Bowl.

Regarded as a five-star recruit by Rivals.com, Tunsil was listed as the highest ranked offensive tackle prospect of his class. Tunsil had offers from every major BCS program, including every Southeastern Conference (SEC) school. From early on, he made depth chart, i.e. the possibility of starting as a true freshman, one of his priorities. He eliminated his home-state Florida Gators early in the process, because the Gators had signed five-star offensive tackle D. J. Humphries from the previous class. For a long period of time, Tunsil was believed to be leaning towards Georgia, since the Bulldogs started true freshman John Theus at right tackle in every game of the 2012 season, and Tunsil hoped to do so at left tackle in 2013 as incumbent starter Kenarious Gates was graduating. But after a visit to Ole Miss in late January, Tunsil reportedly changed his mind and was considered a "done deal" for the Rebels. Tunsil made his announcement on National Signing Day on ESPNU, where he indeed committed to Ole Miss.

== College career ==
At Ole Miss in 2013, Tunsil played every game, starting all but four games—Vanderbilt, Southeast Missouri State, Alabama, and Auburn. He was one of only two true freshmen serving as his team's full-time starting left tackle, the other being Virginia Tech's Jonathan McLaughlin. Tunsil had his first start against Texas, competing against Longhorns defensive end Jackson Jeffcoat, who finished the game with only three tackles and no sacks. Following the Rebels' 34–24 victory over SEC West rival Arkansas, Tunsil was named SEC Offensive Lineman of the Week, after helping the offense piling up 531 total yards and a near-school record 428 passing yards. Tunsil earned SEC All-Freshman honors by the league's coaches, and first-team Freshman All-American honors by The Sporting News, after allowing only one sack throughout his freshman season.

As a sophomore, Tunsil started at left tackle in all 11 games that he played in, only missing the Auburn and Presbyterian games due to a partially torn bicep. Tunsil was back in the starting line-up for the Peach Bowl, but fractured his fibula in the first half when quarterback Bo Wallace fell on the back of his right leg. After the season, Tunsil was named All-SEC by the Associated Press.

In June 2015, before his junior season, Tunsil was accused by his stepfather, Lindsey Miller, of having accepted improper benefits from sports agents. Coach Hugh Freeze decided to bench Tunsil for the season-opener against Tennessee–Martin on September 5, as a "precautionary measure". Tunsil was suspended by the NCAA and missed the first seven games of the season. He was reinstated before the #15 Texas A&M game on October 24. His matchup with defensive end Myles Garrett, who entered the game with 8 1/2 quarterback sacks, was highly anticipated. According to analysts Tunsil emerged as "the big winner", not giving up a sack and helping the Rebels to a 23–3 upset win over the Aggies. Having missed the first half of the season, Tunsil was not selected to any All-American team despite solid performance. During the Sugar Bowl game against Oklahoma State, Tunsil had a two-yard rushing touchdown as time expired in the first half. Ole Miss won the Sugar Bowl, 48–20.

== Professional career ==
Shortly after Ole Miss's bowl game, Tunsil announced his decision to forgo his final college year and enter the 2016 NFL draft. In February, a number of mock drafts projected him to be the No. 1 overall selection by the Tennessee Titans. NFL Media analyst Lance Zierlein compared Tunsil to All-Pro offensive tackle Tyron Smith and predicted that he would be "the best left tackle in the league, or one of the top two, within three years". After an outstanding performance in offensive line drills at the NFL Combine, Tunsil further established himself as the No. 1 draft prospect. On April 14, the Titans announced a trade of their first overall draft pick to the Los Angeles Rams, who were widely believed to be looking for a quarterback rather than an offensive lineman. The Rams went on to select quarterback Jared Goff out of California with that first overall pick.

Ten minutes before the draft was set to begin, Tunsil's Twitter account showed a video of him wearing a gas mask and smoking from a bong. Although Tunsil's agent Jimmy Sexton immediately explained that the account was hacked, it resulted in some teams taking Tunsil off their draft boards entirely. The Baltimore Ravens (at No. 6) and Tennessee Titans (at No. 8), both in need of an offensive tackle, passed over Tunsil and chose Ronnie Stanley and Jack Conklin, respectively. The Miami Dolphins eventually selected him with the 13th overall pick. In a parallel incident, Tunsil's Instagram account published a screenshot of a text requesting money from Ole Miss assistant athletic director John Miller for rent and so Tunsil's mother could pay her electric bill. During a post-draft press conference, Tunsil admitted that he took money from an Ole Miss coach while a member of the school, but explained his Instagram account had also been hacked.

Pre-draft measurables
Height	Weight	Arm length	Hand span	Wingspan	Vertical jump	Broad jump	Bench press
6 ft 5 in (1.96 m)	310 lb (141 kg)	34 1/4 in (0.87 m)	10 in (0.25 m)	6 ft 11 in (2.11 m)	28.5 in (0.72 m)	9 ft 3 in (2.82 m)	34 reps
Values from NFL Combine. Broad, Vertical and Bench from Ole Miss Pro Day.

=== Miami Dolphins ===
On April 28, 2016, the Miami Dolphins selected Tunsil with the 13th overall selection in the 2016 NFL draft. Miami initially had the 8th overall selection until the Dolphins fell to the 13th overall pick following a trade with the Philadelphia Eagles. He was the highest selected offensive lineman for the team since Jake Long went first overall in 2008, and the highest-drafted Ole Miss player since linebacker Patrick Willis went 11th overall to the San Francisco 49ers in 2007. On May 6, 2016, it was announced that Tunsil had signed a $12.45 million, four-year contract with the Dolphins. As a rookie in the 2016 season, Tunsil played in 14 games, 13 of those at the left guard position. He helped Miami to finish with the ninth-best rushing offense in the league. After the 2016 season, veteran left tackle Branden Albert was traded to the Jacksonville Jaguars, making room for Tunsil to move to the left tackle position for the 2017 season. He was named to the PFWA All-Rookie Team. In the 2017 season, Tunsil appeared in and started 15 games. In the 2018 season, Tunsil appeared in and started 15 games once again.

On April 18, 2019, the Dolphins picked up the fifth-year option on Tunsil's contract.

=== Houston Texans ===
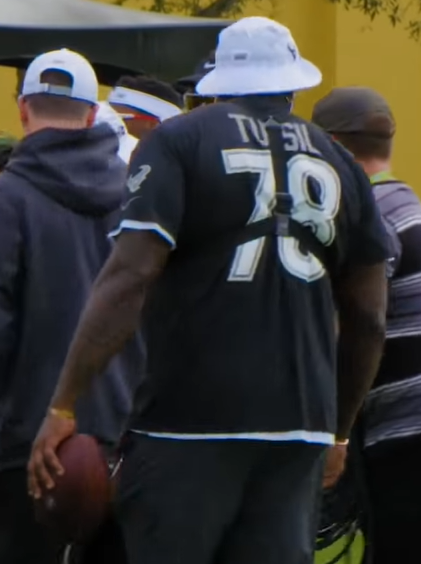
Tunsil at the 2020 Pro Bowl.

On August 31, 2019, Miami traded Tunsil, Kenny Stills, a 2020 NFL draft fourth-round pick (No. 111: Solomon Kindley) and a 2021 NFL draft sixth-round pick (No. 202: the Cincinnati Bengals selected Chris Evans) to the Houston Texans in exchange for both a 2020 (No. 26: the Green Bay Packers selected Jordan Love) and 2021 first-round pick (No. 3: the San Francisco 49ers selected Trey Lance), a 2021 second-round pick (No. 36: Jevon Holland), Johnson Bademosi, and Julien Davenport. The trade was widely considered an unusually high boon for the Dolphins in creating trade capital for themselves, albeit at the loss of a significant performer, not least because they had picked up Tunsil originally in an artificially depressed draft position due to the 'bong incident'. He started 14 games at left tackle in 2019, earning his first trip to the Pro Bowl. Tunsil led the league with 17 penalties, including 14 false starts. He was ranked 66th by his fellow players on he NFL Top 100 Players of 2020.

On April 24, 2020, Tunsil signed a three-year, $66 million contract extension with $57.85 million guaranteed with the Texans, making him the highest-paid offensive lineman in terms of annual value. He played in and started 14 games in the 2020 season, and earned his second Pro Bowl nomination. He was ranked 75th by his fellow players on the NFL Top 100 Players of 2021.

On October 16, 2021, Tunsil was placed on injured reserve after undergoing thumb surgery. In the 2021 season, Tunsil appeared in and started five games. In the 2022 season, he started in all 17 games. He was named to his third Pro Bowl for the 2022 season. Tunsil was ranked 85th by his fellow players on the NFL Top 100 Players of 2023.

On March 19, 2023, Tunsil signed a three year, $75 million contract extension with the Texans. He started in 14 games in the 2023 season. He missed three games early in the season due to a knee injury. He earned Pro Bowl honors for the fourth time in his career. Tunsil was ranked 71st by his fellow players on the NFL Top 100 Players of 2024.

In the 2024 season, Tunsil started in all 17 regular season games and both of the Texans' postseason games. He led the league with 19 penalties, 6 of which came in a loss against the Minnesota Vikings. He earned a fifth Pro Bowl nomination. Tunsil was ranked 86th by his fellow players on the NFL Top 100 Players of 2025.

=== Washington Commanders ===
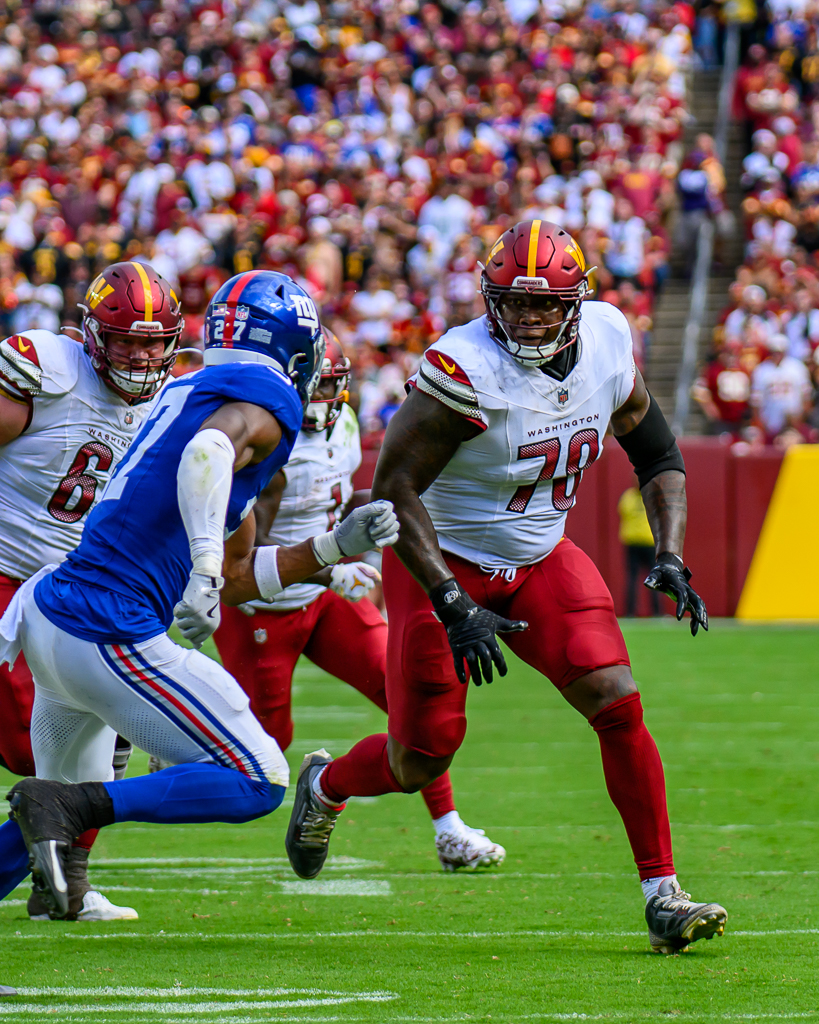
Tunsil blocking against the New York Giants, 2025

On March 15, 2025, the Texans traded Tunsil and a fourth-round pick (No. 128: Jaylin Lane) in the 2025 NFL draft to the Washington Commanders in exchange for their 2025 third-round (No. 79: Jaylin Noel) and seventh-round (No. 236: the Jacksonville Jaguars selected LeQuint Allen) picks, along with Washington's 2026 second (No. 38: the Las Vegas Raiders selected Treydan Stukes) and fourth-round picks. He appeared in and started 14 games in the 2025 season.

On March 13, 2026, Tunsil signed a two-year, $60.2 million contract extension keeping on him contract with the team. At that point in time, this made him the first offensive lineman in NFL history to earn $30 million per season. Tunsil tore his triceps during training camp and was placed on injured reserve to start the season.

=== Statistics ===
Regular season statistics
Year	Team	GP	GS
2016	MIA	14	14
2017	MIA	15	15
2018	MIA	15	15
2019	HOU	14	14
2020	HOU	14	14
2021	HOU	5	5
2022	HOU	17	17
2023	HOU	14	14
2024	HOU	17	17
2025	WAS	14	14
Career		139	139

== Personal life ==
Tunsil was arrested on June 25, 2015, on domestic violence charges in Oxford, Mississippi, after an altercation with his stepfather. Miller claimed the incident stemmed from an argument about Tunsil "riding around with agents," while others claimed Tunsil acted in defense of his mother. Later, Miller met with Chris Howard, the NCAA's director of enforcement, accusing Tunsil of NCAA rules violations, which triggered an NCAA investigation that resulted in Tunsil's suspension for the first seven games of the 2015 season at Ole Miss.
