= Shayne Edge =

American football player (born 1971)

No. 14
- Position: Punter

Personal information
- Born: August 21, 1971 (age 55); Lake City, Florida, U.S.
- Listed height: 5 ft 11 in (1.80 m)
- Listed weight: 204 lb (93 kg)

Career information
- High school: Columbia (Lake City)
- College: Florida
- NFL draft: 1995: undrafted

Career history
- Tampa Bay Buccaneers (1995)*; Barcelona Dragons (1996); Pittsburgh Steelers (1996); New Orleans Saints (1997)*; Kansas City Chiefs (1998)*; San Francisco 49ers (1999)*
- * Offseason or practice squad member only

Awards and highlights
- First-team All-SEC (1991); 2× Second-team All-SEC (1993, 1994)

Career NFL statistics
- Punts: 17
- Punting yards: 675
- Average: 39.7
- Stats at Pro Football Reference

Randall Shayne Edge (born August 21, 1971) is an American former professional football player who was a punter in the National Football League (NFL) during the 1990s. Edge played college football for the Florida Gators, and thereafter, he played in the NFL for the Pittsburgh Steelers.

== Early life ==
Edge was born in Georgia. He attended Columbia High School in Lake City, and played high school football for the Columbia Tigers.

== College career ==
Edge accepted an athletic scholarship to attend the University of Florida in Gainesville, Florida, where he played for coach Steve Spurrier's Gators teams from 1991 to 1994. In four seasons as the Gators' starting punter, he averaged 42.5 yards per kick, which remains the fifth-highest all-time career average by a Gators punter. Edge was recognized as a second-team All-Southeastern Conference (SEC) selection in 1993 and 1994, and was an honorable mention All-American in 1991, 1992, 1993 and 1994. During his time as a Gator, he was a member of the first three officially recognized SEC championship teams. He graduated from the University of Florida with a bachelor's degree in 2000.

== Professional career ==
Edge started his career with the World League's Barcelona Dragons for the 1995–96 season and averaged 40.1 yards per punt.

In the summer of 1996, Edge was invited to attend Steelers training game, where he and veteran Rohn Stark would compete for the starting job. Edge was cut prior to the final preseason game and was replaced by former Steelers punter Josh Miller. Miller was placed on the injured reserve due to a sports hernia that occurred during a week four game vs the Buffalo Bills. Miller's recovery was listed as being 2–4 weeks, and Edge was signed by the Steelers on September 25, 1996.

In Edge's first game with the Steelers, Edge was one of several Steelers players involved in an end zone fight with several Houston Oilers players. The fight eventually drifted from the end zone near a group of spectators. Edge was fined $5,000 and was the only Steelers player ejected from the game. Once his Player's Association dues and fines were paid, Edge barely broke even from his first game check. When asked about his first game, Edge said "I worked for free. There was nothing left." Edge was waived by the Steelers on October 26, 1996. In four games with the Steelers, Edge averaged 39.7 yards per punt.

Edge attended training camp with the New Orleans Saints during the 1997 NFL season, but was waived on August 18, 1997.

Edge was signed by the Kansas City Chiefs on June 23, 1998, but was waived from the team prior to the completion of training camp on August 25, 1998.

The following season, the San Francisco 49ers signed Edge to a two-year contract on March 18, 1999, but was waived by the team on August 28, 1999.

In 2006, Edge was named to the Florida Gators 100th Anniversary team, with voting decided by fans voting via internet and by mail-in ballots.

== See also ==
- Florida Gators football, 1990–99
- List of Pittsburgh Steelers players
