= Timmy Jernigan =

American football player (born 1992)

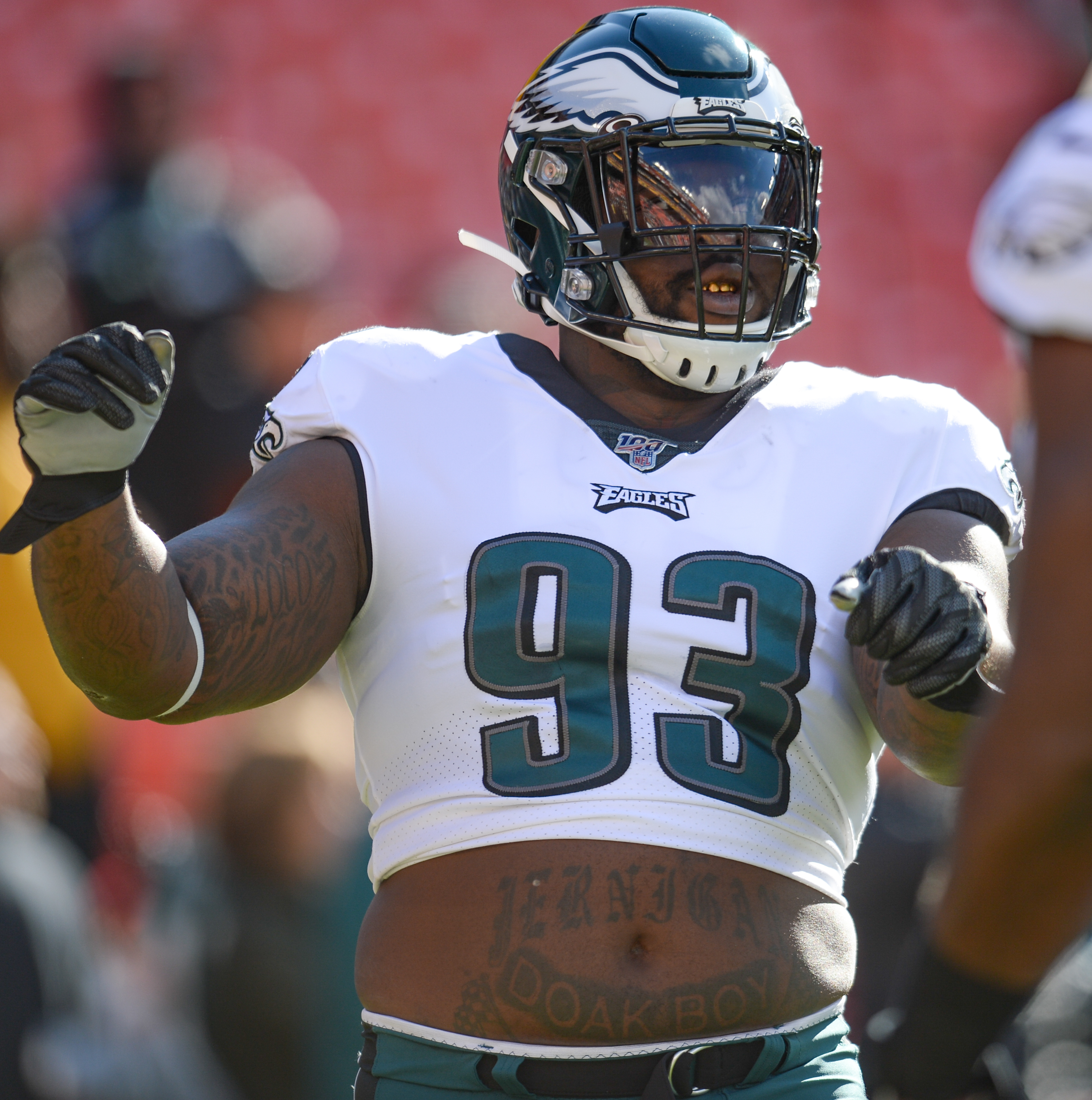
- Jernigan with the Philadelphia Eagles in 2019

No. 97, 99, 93, 77, 98
- Position: Defensive end

Personal information
- Born: September 24, 1992 (age 34); Lake City, Florida, U.S.
- Listed height: 6 ft 2 in (1.88 m)
- Listed weight: 295 lb (134 kg)

Career information
- High school: Columbia (Lake City)
- College: Florida State (2011–2013)
- NFL draft: 2014: 2nd round, 48th overall pick

Career history
- Baltimore Ravens (2014–2016); Philadelphia Eagles (2017–2019); Jacksonville Jaguars (2020); Denver Broncos (2020)

Awards and highlights
- Super Bowl champion (LII); PFWA All-Rookie Team (2014); BCS national champion (2013); First-team All-American (2013); Second-team All-ACC (2013)

Career NFL statistics
- Total tackles: 133
- Sacks: 17.5
- Fumble recoveries: 1
- Interceptions: 1
- Stats at Pro Football Reference

Timothy Lenord Jernigan Jr. (born September 24, 1992) is an American former professional football player who was an interior defensive lineman in the National Football League (NFL). He was selected by the Baltimore Ravens in the second round of the 2014 NFL draft. He played college football for the Florida State Seminoles.

== Early life ==
A native of Lake City, Florida, Jernigan attended Columbia High School, where he was an All-American defensive lineman and teammates with All-American offensive lineman Laremy Tunsil for his junior and senior year. As a junior, Jernigan registered 131 tackles, 27 tackles for loss, 12 sacks, three forced fumbles and three fumble recoveries and was a 3A All-State selection. In his senior season, he added 77 tackles, 32 tackles for loss, 14 sacks and one interception. Regarded nationally as one of the best defensive lineman in his class, he participated in the 2011 U.S. Army All-American Bowl and was a USA Today All-USA selection. He was also a member of the track & field team.

Considered a four-star recruit by Rivals.com, Jernigan was listed as the No. 2 defensive lineman in his class, behind only Anthony Johnson. Recruited by dozens of schools, Jernigan took official visits to Florida State, Michigan, Louisiana State, and Tennessee, before committing to the Seminoles on National Signing Day 2011.

== College career ==
In his true freshman season, Jernigan served as backup to Everett Dawkins at defensive tackle for the Seminoles. He saw action in all 13 games and led all FSU interior defensive linemen with 30 tackles, six tackles for loss and 2.5 quarterback sacks. Jernigan was named winner of the Devaughn Darling Award given to the top newcomer on defense at the team's annual banquet. He was also named a Freshman All-American by the Football Writers Association of America.

Still serving as Dawkins' reserve in 2012, Jernigan was one of the leading tacklers on the team with 46. He also ranked fourth on FSU in tackles for loss with eight. In his final four games, Jernigan recorded 22 tackles, two tackles for loss and a sack. In the 2012 ACC Championship Game against Georgia Tech, he recorded the team's only sack, was second on the squad with 1.5 tackles for loss and was third on the team with nine tackles.

Jernigan led Florida State with 11 tackles for loss in 2013. Jernigan finished this season with 63 tackles, including 4.5 sacks, and was a second-team Associated Press All-American while FSU won the national championship.

Jernigan announced on January 9, 2014, that he would forgo his senior season and enter the 2014 NFL draft.

== Professional career ==
Pre-draft measurables
Height	Weight	Arm length	Hand span	Wingspan	40-yard dash	10-yard split	20-yard split	20-yard shuttle	Three-cone drill	Vertical jump	Broad jump	Bench press
6 ft 1 5/8 in (1.87 m)	299 lb (136 kg)	31 5/8 in (0.80 m)	9 5/8 in (0.24 m)	6 ft 5 3/8 in (1.97 m)	5.06 s	1.76 s	2.94 s	4.83 s	7.65 s	29 1/2 in (0.75 m)	8 ft 6 in (2.59 m)	27 reps
All values from NFL Combine/Pro Day

=== Baltimore Ravens ===
Projected a first-rounder by CBS Sports, Jernigan was selected by the Baltimore Ravens in the second round (48th overall) of the 2014 NFL draft. Jernigan was late for a team meeting as a rookie in 2014 because he was outside playing in the snow; having been born and raised in Florida, Jernigan had never seen snow before. He was named to the PFWA All-Rookie Team.

In 2016, Jernigan started 15 of 16 games, finishing second on the team with five sacks.

=== Philadelphia Eagles ===
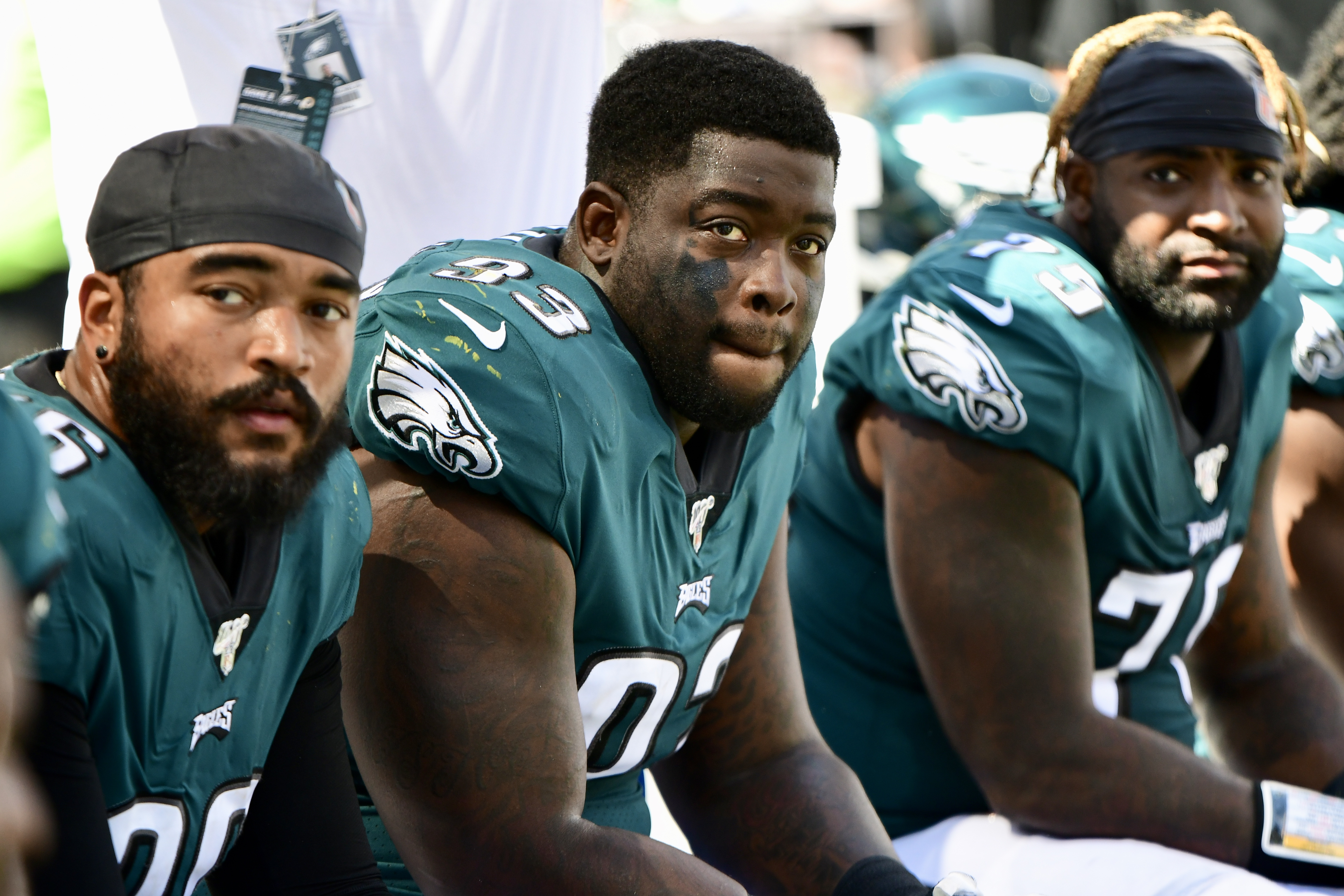
Jernigan (center) in 2019

On April 4, 2017, the Ravens traded Jernigan to the Philadelphia Eagles along with the 99th overall pick in the 2017 NFL draft in exchange for the Eagles third round pick (74th overall) in the 2017 NFL draft. The Ravens selected Chris Wormley with the acquired selection.

After starting the first nine games of the season with the Eagles, Jernigan signed a four-year, $48 million contract extension with the team. Jernigan finished the season with 29 tackles and 2.5 sacks. The Eagles won Super Bowl LII after defeating the New England Patriots 41–33 with Jernigan recording one tackle.

After the 2017 season Jernigan had surgery on his back on May 3, 2018. He was placed on the reserve/non-football injury (NFI) list to start the 2018 season. He was activated off the NFI list on November 20, 2018.

On March 4, 2019, the Eagles declined the option on Jernigan's contract, making him an unrestricted free agent. On April 25, 2019, the Eagles re-signed Jernigan to a one-year deal.

=== Jacksonville Jaguars ===
Jernigan signed with the Jacksonville Jaguars on August 17, 2020. On September 28, Jernigan was released by the Jaguars.

=== Denver Broncos ===
On September 30, 2020, Jernigan signed with the Denver Broncos. He was released by the Broncos on October 20.

== NFL career statistics ==
Legend
**Bold**	Career high

=== Regular season ===
Year	Team	Games		Tackles					Interceptions					Fumbles			
Year	Team	GP	GS	Cmb	Solo	Ast	Sck	TFL	Int	Yds	TD	Lng	PD	FF	FR	Yds	TD
2014	BAL	12	3	23	11	12	4.0	3	0	0	0	0	0	0	0	0	0
2015	BAL	15	6	**37**	**18**	**19**	4.0	4	0	0	0	0	0	0	0	0	0
2016	BAL	**16**	**15**	31	16	15	**5.0**	**9**	**1**	0	0	0	**3**	0	**1**	**1**	0
2017	PHI	15	**15**	29	16	13	2.5	**9**	0	0	0	0	0	0	0	0	0
2018	PHI	3	3	2	2	0	0.0	1	0	0	0	0	0	0	0	0	0
2019	PHI	10	9	10	7	3	2.0	3	0	0	0	0	0	0	0	0	0
2020	JAX	3	0	1	0	1	0.0	0	0	0	0	0	0	0	0	0	0
2020	DEN	2	0	0	0	0	0.0	0	0	0	0	0	0	0	0	0	0
Career		76	51	133	70	63	17.5	29	1	0	0	0	3	0	1	1	0

=== Playoffs ===
Year	Team	Games		Tackles					Interceptions					Fumbles			
Year	Team	GP	GS	Cmb	Solo	Ast	Sck	TFL	Int	Yds	TD	Lng	PD	FF	FR	Yds	TD
2014	BAL	1	0	2	**2**	0	**1.0**	**1**	0	0	0	0	0	0	0	0	0
2017	PHI	**3**	**3**	2	0	2	0.0	0	0	0	0	0	0	0	0	0	0
2018	PHI	2	1	**3**	0	**3**	**1.0**	0	0	0	0	0	0	0	0	0	0
2019	PHI	1	1	2	0	2	0.0	0	0	0	0	0	0	0	0	0	0
Career		7	5	9	2	7	2.0	1	0	0	0	0	0	0	0	0	0
