= Jerome Carter =

American football player (born 1982)

No. 42, 23
- Position: Safety

Personal information
- Born: October 25, 1982 (age 44); Lake City, Florida, U.S.
- Listed height: 5 ft 11 in (1.80 m)
- Listed weight: 219 lb (99 kg)

Career information
- High school: Columbia (Lake City)
- College: Florida State
- NFL draft: 2005: 4th round, 117th overall pick

Career history
- St. Louis Rams (2005–2007); Dallas Cowboys (2009)*; Florida Tuskers (2009–2010); Virginia Destroyers (2011–2012)
- * Offseason or practice squad member only

Awards and highlights
- UFL champion (2011)

Career NFL statistics
- Total tackles: 72
- Forced fumbles: 1
- Pass deflections: 2
- Interceptions: 2
- Stats at Pro Football Reference

Jerome Carter (born October 25, 1982) is an American former professional football player who was a safety in the National Football League (NFL). He was selected by the St. Louis Rams in the fourth round of the 2005 NFL draft. He played college football for the Florida State Seminoles.

Carter was also a member of the Dallas Cowboys, Florida Tuskers, and Virginia Destroyers.

== Early life ==
Carter attended Columbia High School in Lake City, Florida, where he first-team All-State selection, and as a senior, was named the top player in the state by The Gainesville Sun, and the Class 5A Player of the Year by the Florida Association of Coaches.

== College career ==
Carter played college football at Florida State University where he finished his career with 257 tackles, 2.5 sacks and three interceptions. Carter was elected defensive team captain as a senior and was voted honorable mention All-Atlantic Coast Conference as a junior. He majored in social science.

== Professional career ==
Pre-draft measurables
| Height | Weight | 40-yard dash | 10-yard split | 20-yard split | 20-yard shuttle | Three-cone drill | Vertical jump | Broad jump | Bench press |
|---|---|---|---|---|---|---|---|---|---|
| 5 ft 11 3/8 in (1.81 m) | 220 lb (100 kg) | 4.55 s | 1.65 s | 2.69 s | 4.04 s | 7.18 s | 35 in (0.89 m) | 10 ft 1 in (3.07 m) | 21 reps |
All values from NFL Combine

=== St. Louis Rams ===
Carter was selected by the St. Louis Rams in the fourth round (117th overall) in the 2005 NFL draft. In his rookie season he played in 14 games and finished the campaign with 38 tackles including a career-high 12 tackles at the Houston Texans on November 27.

In 2006, Carter made 18 tackles and recorded two interceptions. The first of his career came against the Detroit Lions on October 1.

Carter's 2007 season was cut short and only played in five games due to a foot injury. He finished the season with two tackles.

On March 11, 2008, Carter re-signed for the Rams as an unrestricted free agent. However, he was released by the Rams during final cuts on August 29, 2008, and spent the season out of football.

=== Dallas Cowboys ===
On January 12, 2009, Carter was signed to a future contract by the Dallas Cowboys. He was waived on August 5, 2009.

== Personal Life ==
His son, Jerome Carter III, is a defensive back for Clemson.
