= Sikes House =

Historic house in Florida, United States

- U.S. National Register of Historic Places
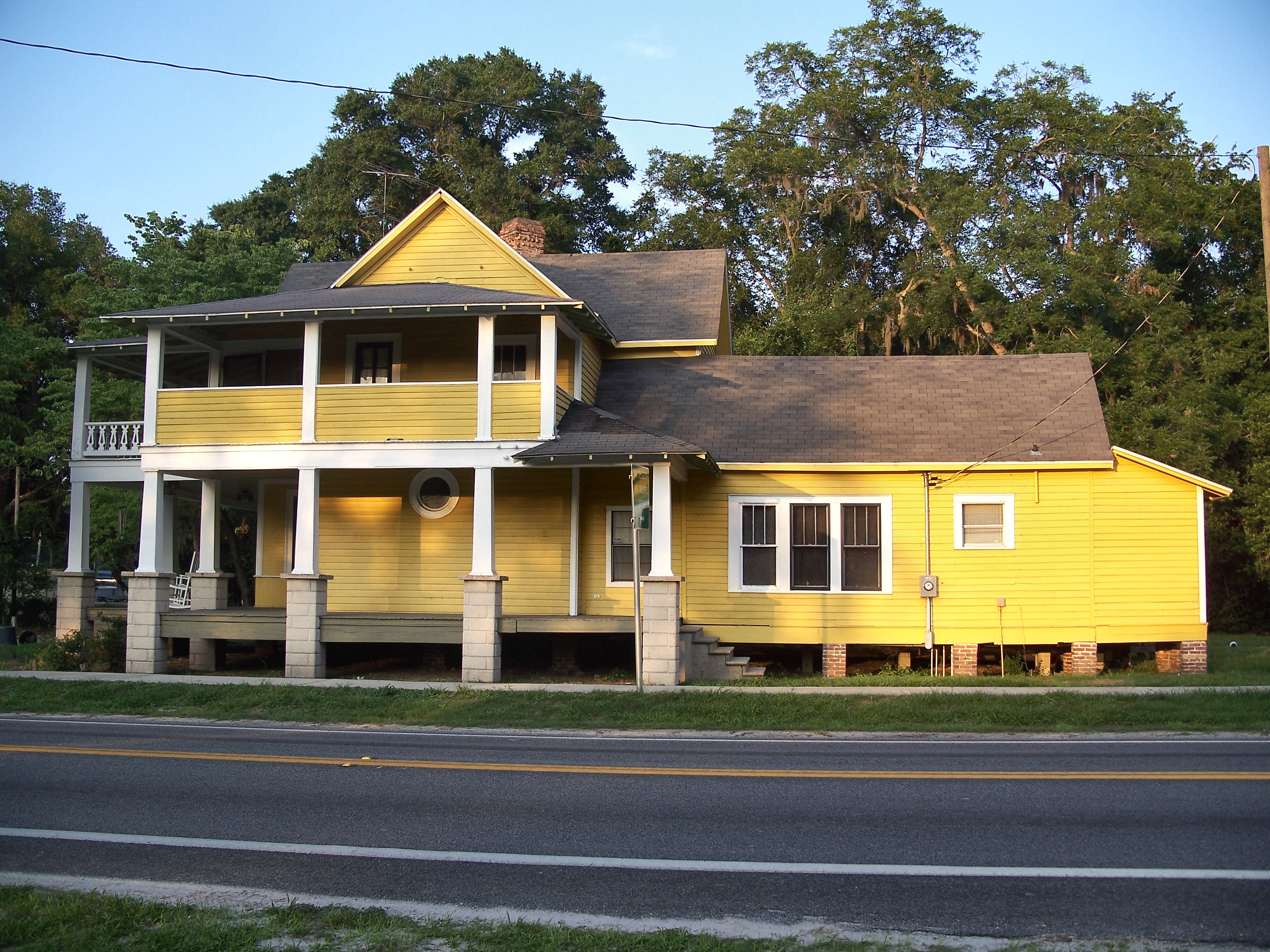

- Location within Florida Location within the United States
- Location: Fort White, Florida
- Coordinates: 29°55′20″N 82°42′49″W
- NRHP reference No.: 06001318
- Added to NRHP: February 1, 2007

The Sikes House is a historic home in Fort White, Florida, United States. It is located at 288 Ellis Street, just south of US 27. On February 1, 2007, it was added to the U.S. National Register of Historic Places.
