= Fort White Public School Historic District =

Historic district in Florida, United States

- U.S. National Register of Historic Places
- U.S. Historic district
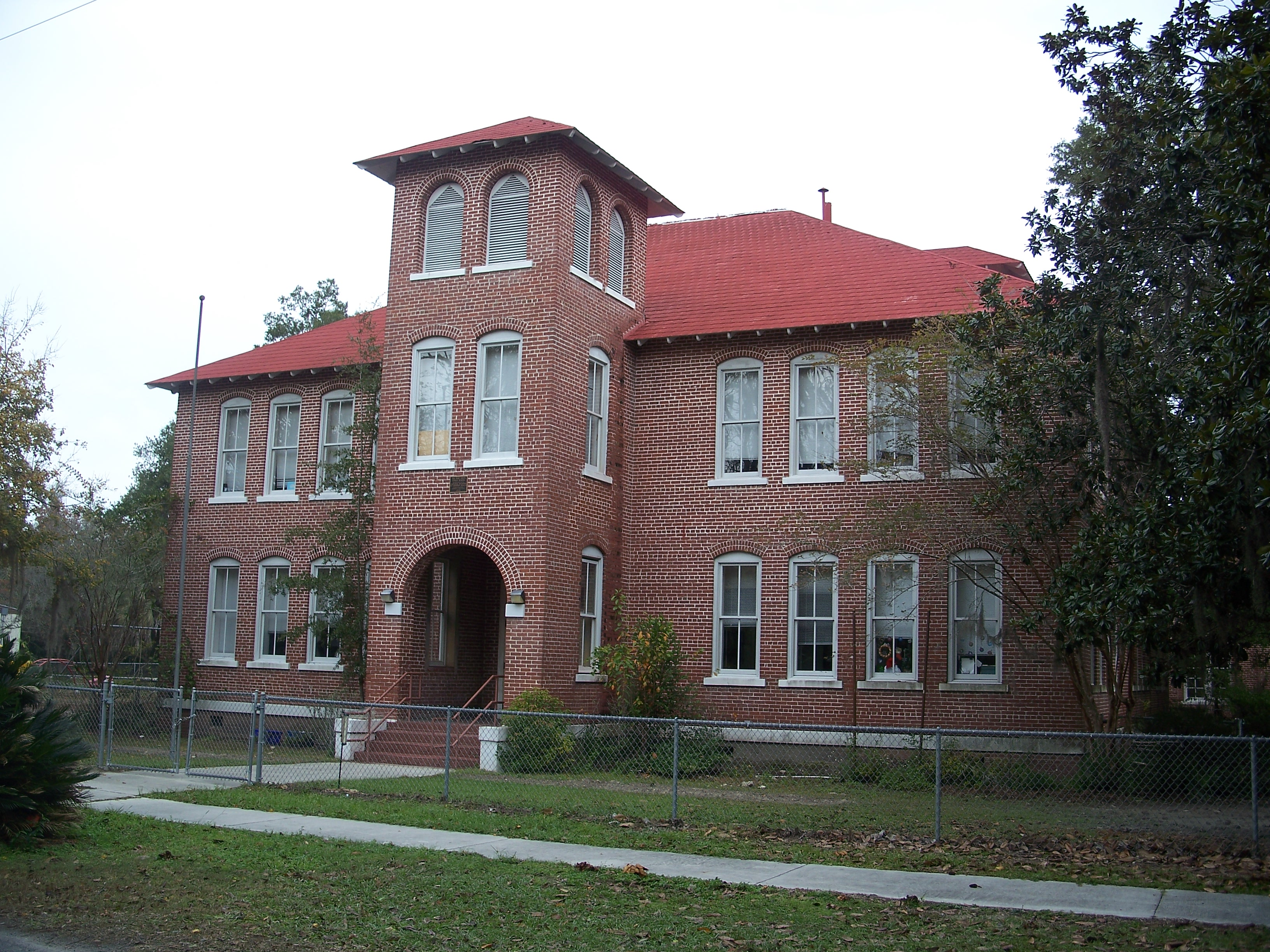

- Location within Florida Location within the United States
- Location: Fort White, Florida
- Coordinates: 29°55′32″N 82°42′45″W
- Area: 1 acre (0.40 ha)
- NRHP reference No.: 89002061
- Added to NRHP: December 1, 1989

The Fort White Public School Historic District is a U.S. historic district (designated on December 1, 1989) located in Fort White, Florida. The district is near the intersection of East Dorch and North Bryant Streets. It contains 3 historic buildings.

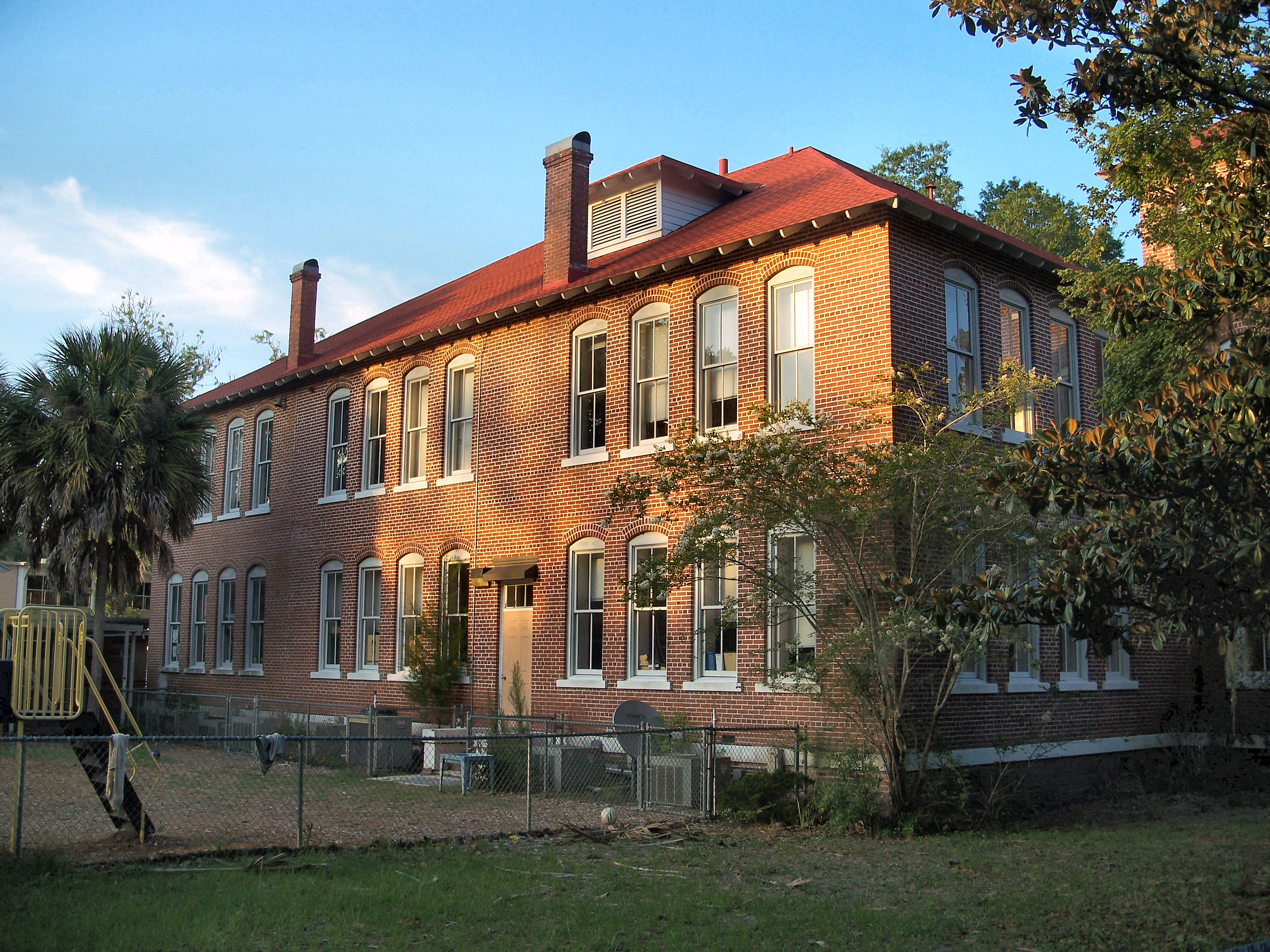
Original Fort White School building, part of the Fort White Public School Historic District

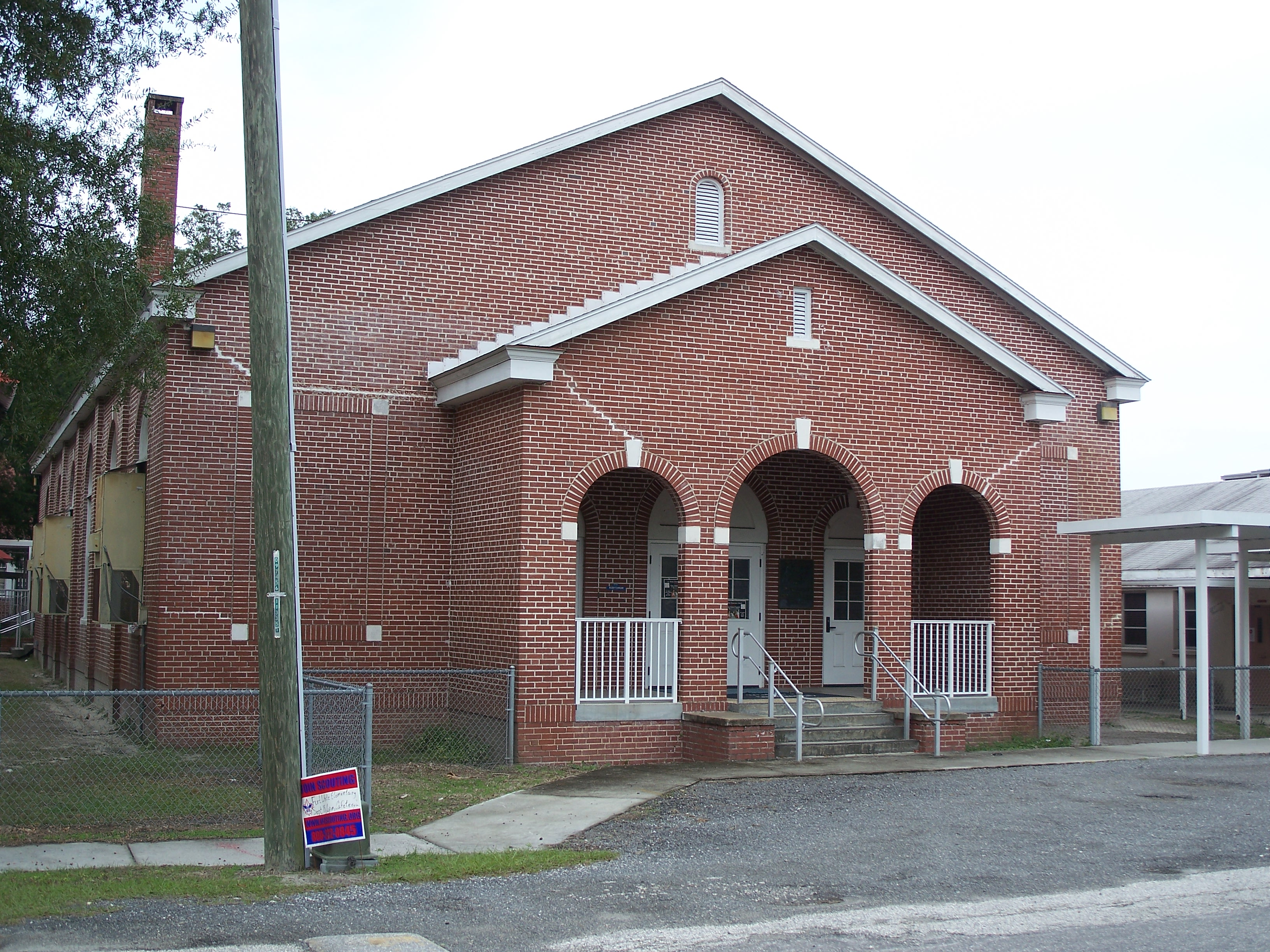
Fort White Public School Auditorium at the original Fort White High School

The original Fort White High School was constructed during 1915 in the masonry vernacular. The building included an Italianate tower and an auditorium was added in 1936. Separate elementary school classrooms were completed in 1938.
