= Columbia County High School =

- U.S. National Register of Historic Places
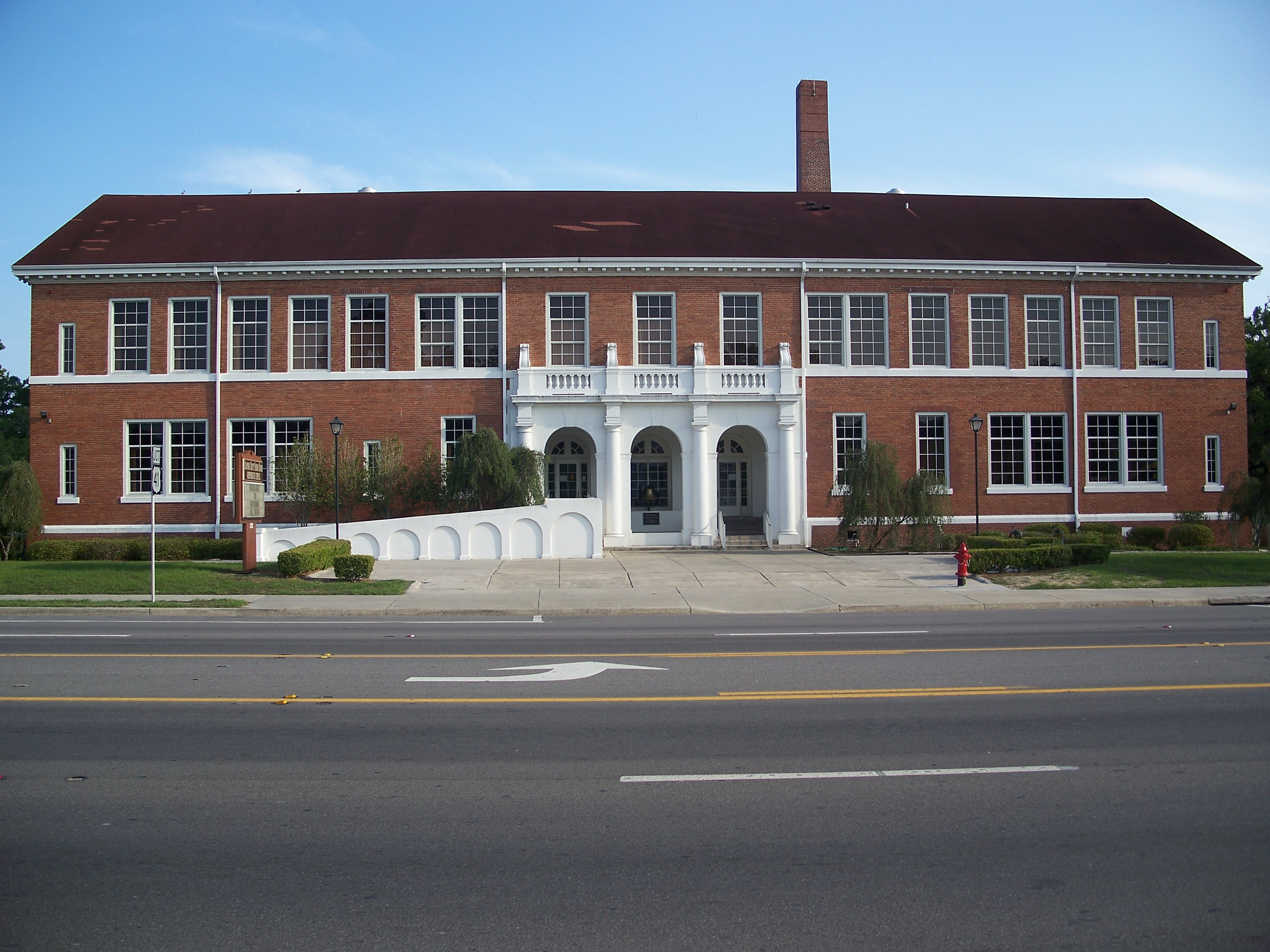

- Location within Florida Location within the United States
- Location: 372 W. Duval St., Lake City, Florida
- Coordinates: 30°11′20″N 82°38′30″W
- Built: 1921, 1926
- Architectural style: Masonry Vernacular with some Italianate elements
- NRHP reference No.: 93001154
- Added to NRHP: November 15, 1993

The original Columbia County High School is a historic building in Lake City, Florida, United States, located at 372 West Duval Street. It is now the location of Columbia County School District administrative offices. It was built in 1921 and was the only high school in Columbia County. When enrollment exceeded capacity, it was replaced in 1957 by a larger facility on Pennsylvania Avenue, which was named Columbia High School. The original high school was used as the school board administrative offices for a time, then converted into Lake City Junior High School in the mid-1970s. It was the site of serial killer Ted Bundy's abduction of 12 year old Kimberly Leach on February 9, 1978. There had been reports of a white van circling the building. Bundy abducted Leach as she left the side door of the main building, facing towards Southwest Ritch Terrace, as she headed to the rear of the site to visit the school's auditorium at between 9:20 a.m. to 9:25 a.m. Bundy was then seen leading Leach across Duval Street where his white van was parked in the westbound lane.

The Columbia County Schools administrative offices returned to the building after Lake City Middle School was constructed and opened in 1990. On November 15, 1993, the building was added to the U.S. National Register of Historic Places.
