= Goodbread–Black Farm Historic District =

Historic district in Florida, United States

- U.S. National Register of Historic Places
- U.S. Historic district
- Location within Florida Location within the United States
- Location: Lake City, Florida
- Coordinates: 30.31289°N 82.65076°W
- Area: 491 acres (199 ha)
- NRHP reference No.: 99000409
- Added to NRHP: April 1, 1999

The Goodbread–Black Farm Historic District is a U.S. historic district (designated as such on April 1, 1999) located north of Lake City, Florida. The district is off Corinth Road, bounded by Suwannee Road to the north, US 41 to the west, and US 441 to the east. It contains two historic buildings and two structures. The Goodbread family established the homestead in 1868 and the Black family joined through marriage. The family continues to own and operate it. Lassie Goodbread-Black was the certified family member of the Century Pioneer Family Farm Program, established by the state of Florida in 1985 to honor families who have maintained at least 100 years of continuous family farm ownership. She was also named a Great Floridian by the State of Florida.
