= Ichetucknee Springs State Park =

State park in Florida, United States

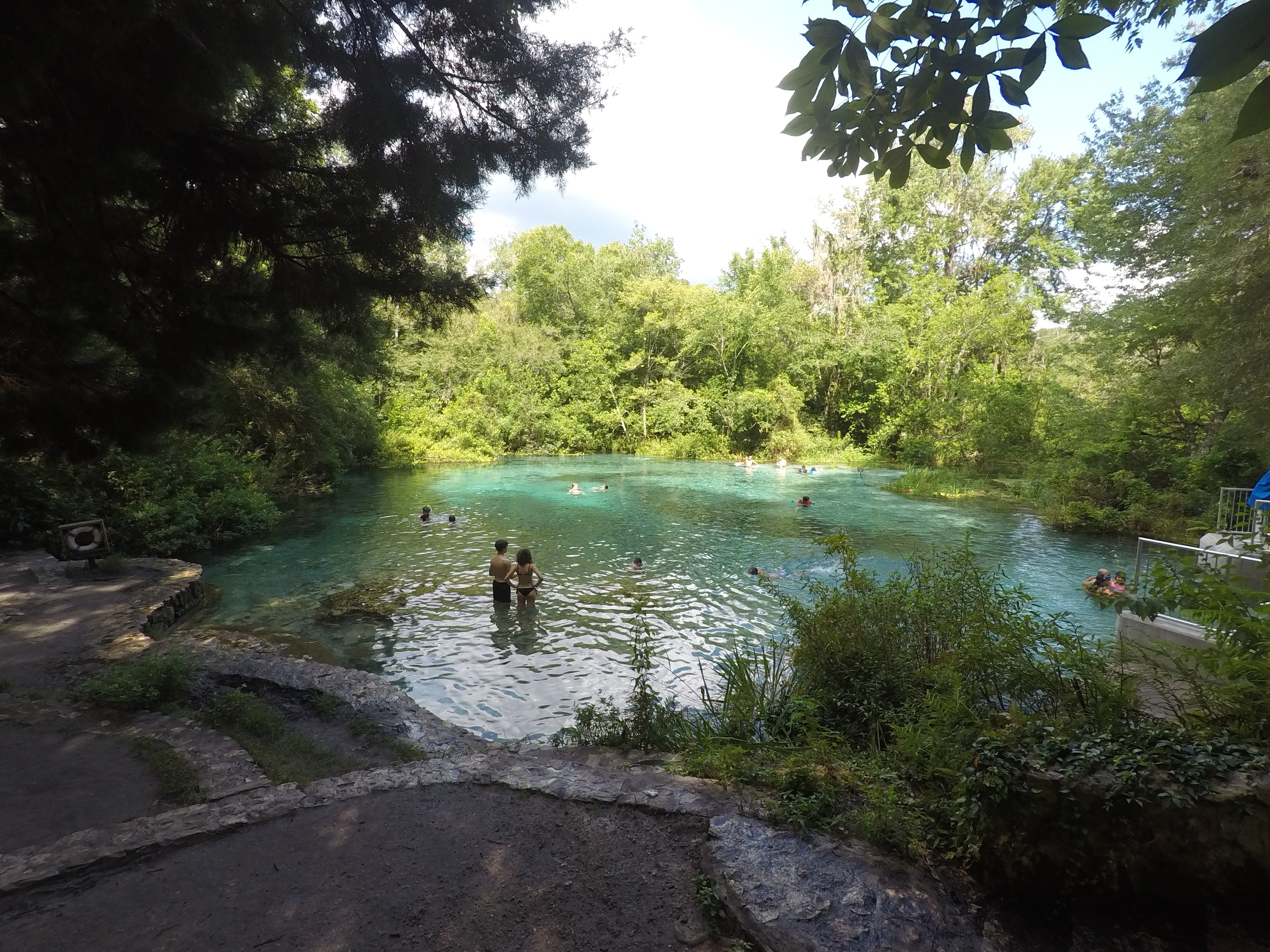
- Headspring

- Location within Florida Location within the United States
- Interactive map of Ichetucknee Springs State Park
- Location: Columbia, Florida, USA
- Nearest city: Fort White, Florida
- Coordinates: 29°58′2.47″N 82°46′33.82″W
- Area: 2,241 acres (9.07 km^{2})
- Governing body: Florida Department of Environmental Protection
- Website: https://www.floridastateparks.org/parks-and-trails/ichetucknee-springs-state-park?origin=serp_auto

U.S. National Natural Landmark
- Designated: October 1971

Ichetucknee Springs State Park is a 2,241-acre (9.07 km^{2}) Florida State Park and National Natural Landmark located 4 miles (6.4 km) northwest of Fort White off State Road 47 and State Road 238. It centers around the 6-mile-long (9.7 km) Ichetucknee River, which flows through shaded hammocks and wetlands into the Santa Fe River. The park contains hardwood hammock and limestone outcrops. Like many rivers in this part of North Florida, the Ichetucknee is fed by natural springs which boil up (in various holes) from the aquifer. The state of Florida purchased the property in 1970 from the Loncala Phosphate Corporation for $1,850,000.

== History ==
=== Phosphate Mining ===
Exploration mining for phosphate began prior to the start of the 20th century, which consisted of mule and wheelbarrow-assisted excavation. Later, boilers, pumps and steam shovels were used to extract ores. Compared to present-day methods, the early phase of mining used were less intrusive.

=== The Loncala Era ===
During the 1950s and 1960s, Loncala Phosphate Company owned the land surrounding Ichetucknee Springs. During this time, people discovered tubing, which brought college students from Gainesville to the river and springs to be what became a summer ritual. In 1970, Loncala sold the property to the state of Florida out of concern for the protection of the spring-run ecosystem. After being cleaned and facilities being built, the river and springs were declared a National Natural Landmark in 1972.

== Fauna ==
Park wildlife includes white-tailed deer, raccoons, wild turkeys, wood ducks and great blue herons. There are also fish and reptiles: i.e. turtles, water snakes, American alligators, North American river otters, West Indian manatees in the winter months, crayfish, bream, bluegill, largemouth bass, alligator gar, mullet, catfish, and several types of minnows.

== Recreational activities ==
During the summer, one of the most popular park activities is floating down the Ichetucknee River in an innertube. From the end of May until early September, "tubing" down the river is the premier activity in the park. They also offer kayaking and canoeing through in certain areas. As the water in this spring-fed river is remarkably clear, swimming, snorkeling and scuba diving are extremely popular. The river's year-round temperature is 72 °F (22 °C) and therefore makes for a refreshingly cool escape from the hot afternoon temperatures in the region. Tubes, rafts, canoes, and kayaks as well as snorkeling and diving equipment can be rented from private vendors outside the park.

=== Seasonality ===
The tubing season from the North entrance begins on the Friday before Memorial Day. Tubing from the North entrance is closed from the day after Labor Day until the Friday before Memorial Day

At the South entrance, the tram service operates from Memorial Day weekend through Labor Day. Rented innertubes and rafts are dropped off (at the end of the trip) in designated areas at the "take-out" point. This is a popular weekend getaway for the students (and faculty) of the nearby University of Florida.

Amenities within this state park include restrooms, dressing rooms, a concession stand, nature trails, picnic tables and grills.

== Archaeology ==
A 17th century Spanish mission site has been identified in the park, next to a short tributary connecting Fig Springs to the Ichetucknee River, about one mile (1.6 km) downstream from the head of the river. The mission has been provisionally identified as San Martín de Timucua, which was occupied in the first half of the 17th century. Plans to reconstruct the mission and open it to the public as an interpretational site were dropped.

== Hours ==
The park opens at 8 a.m. every day of the year (including holidays) and closes at sunset. The Education and Exhibit Center is open Thursday through Monday, 10:00 a.m. to 2:00 p.m.

== Gallery ==
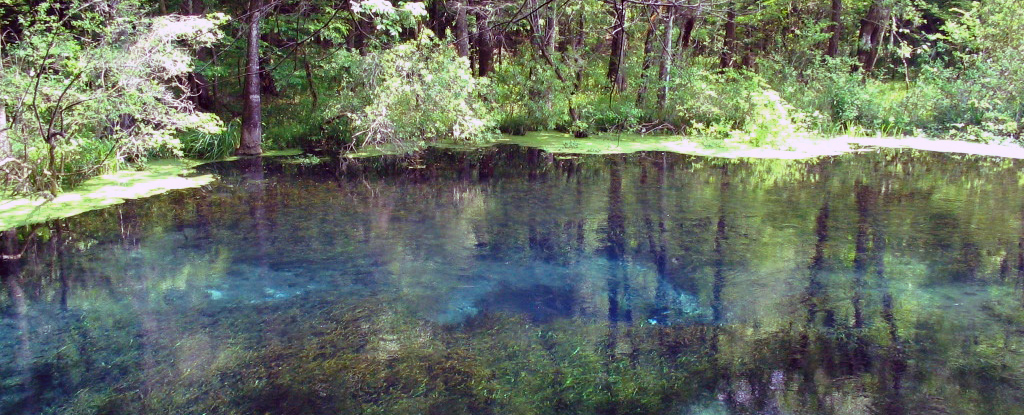
Blue Spring

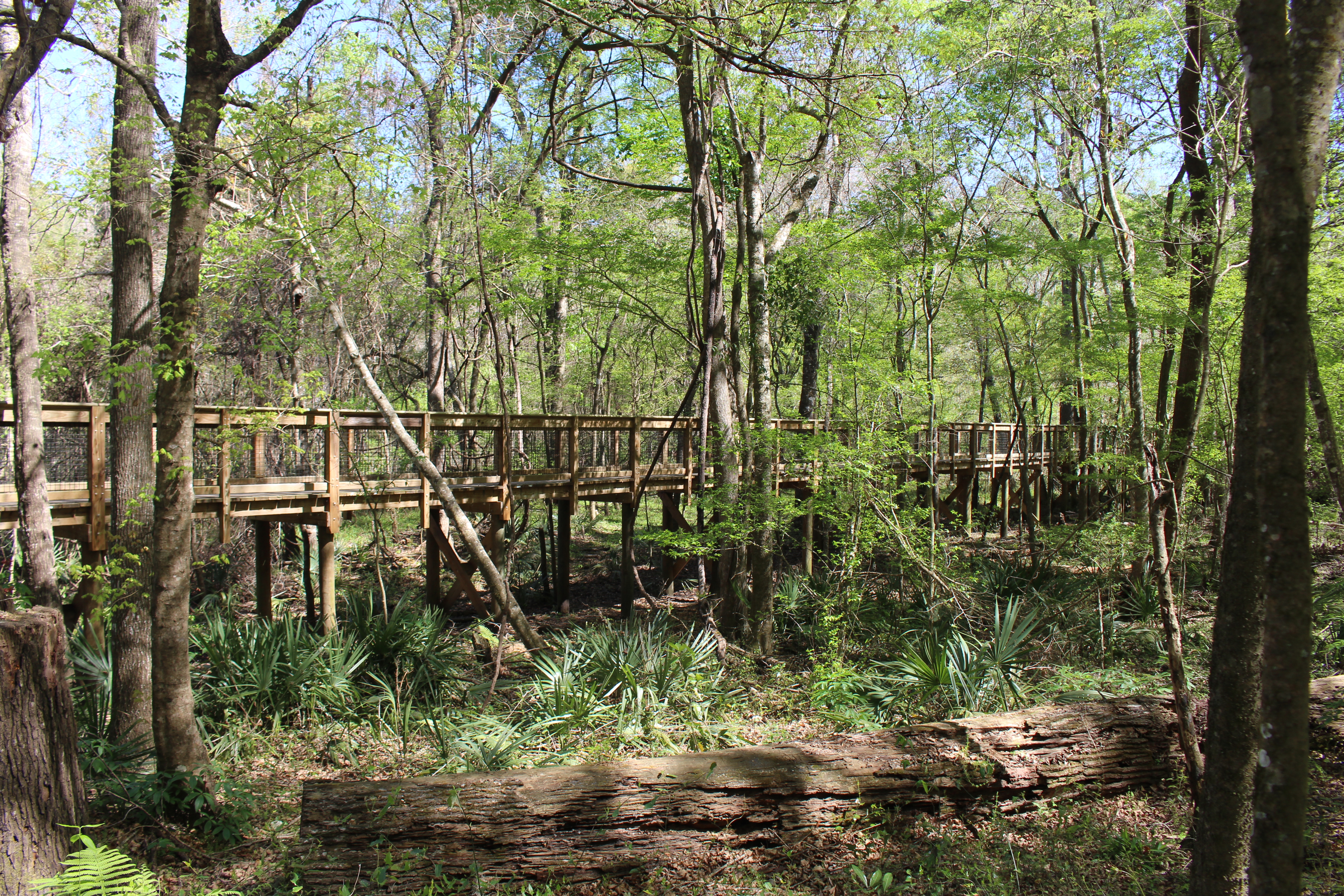
Blue Hole Trail pedestrian bridge viewed from the Head Spring Trail

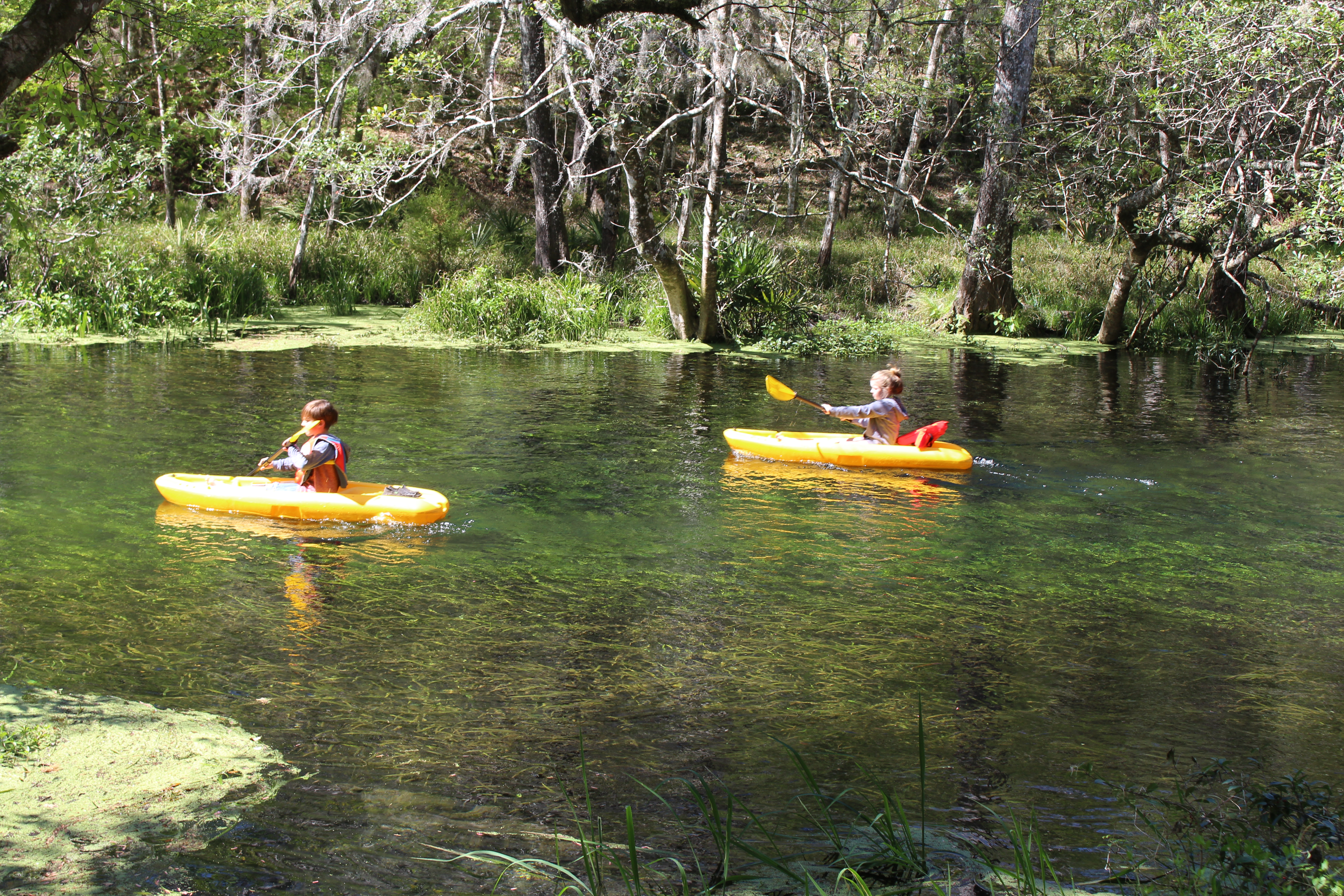
Children paddling down the Ichetucknee River

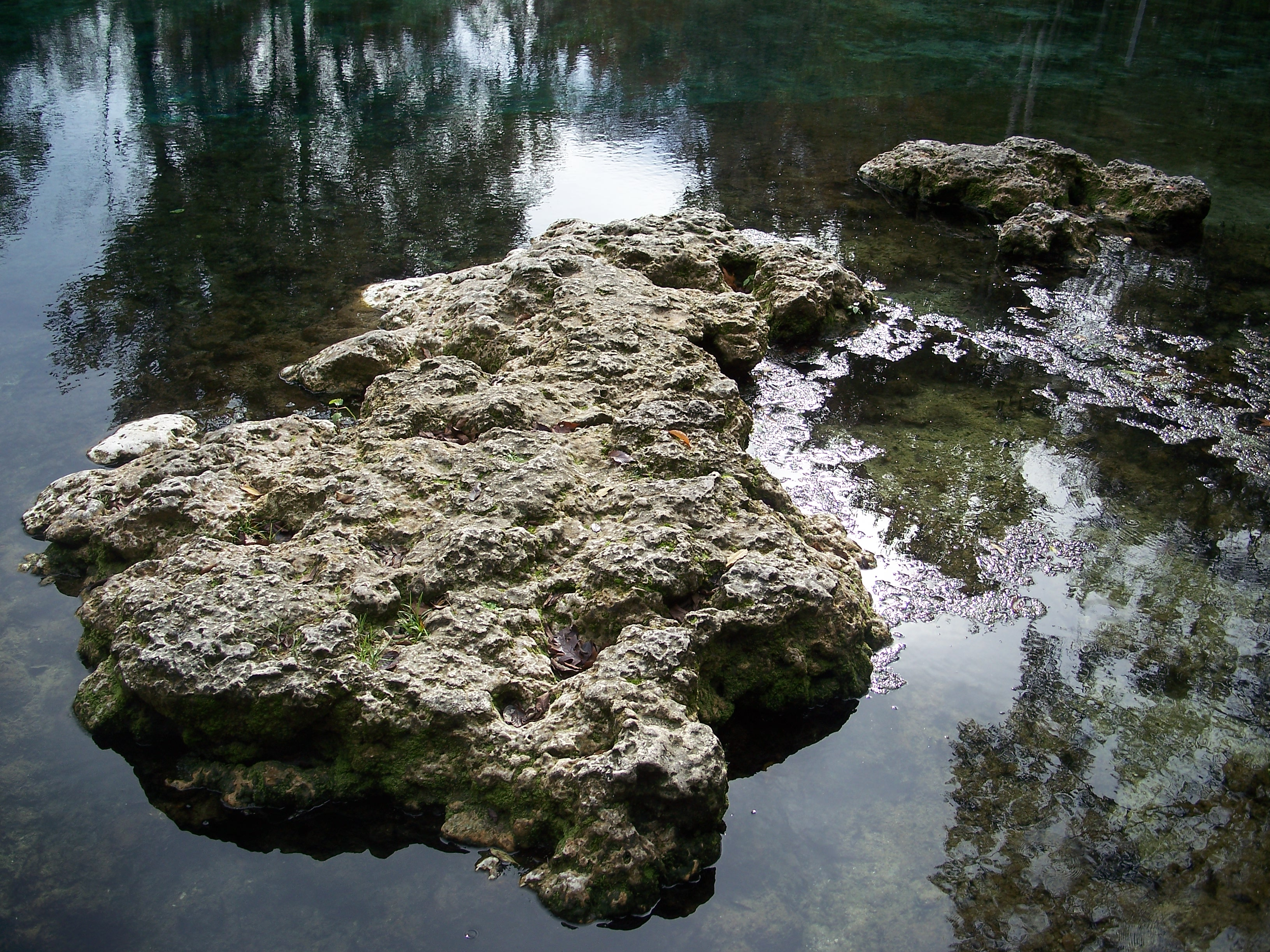
Stones in the headspring
