= Brian Allen (linebacker) =

American football player (born 1978)

No. 51, 52
- Position: Linebacker

Personal information
- Born: April 1, 1978 (age 48); Lake City, Florida, U.S.
- Listed height: 6 ft 0 in (1.83 m)
- Listed weight: 232 lb (105 kg)

Career information
- High school: Columbia (Lake City, Florida)
- College: Florida State
- NFL draft: 2001: 3rd round, 83rd overall pick
- Expansion draft: 2002: 1st round, 18th overall pick

Career history
- St. Louis Rams (2001); Houston Texans (2002)*; Carolina Panthers (2002–2004); Washington Redskins (2005)*; Jacksonville Jaguars (2005)*
- * Offseason or practice squad member only

Awards and highlights
- BCS national champion (1999); 2× Second-team All-ACC (1999, 2000)

Career NFL statistics
- Tackles: 95
- Sacks: 1
- Interceptions: 1
- Stats at Pro Football Reference

Brian Lamar Allen (born April 1, 1978) is an American former professional football player who was a linebacker for four seasons in the National Football League (NFL). Allen played college football at Florida State University.

== Early life ==
A native of Lake City, Florida, Allen attended Columbia High School, where he played linebacker and was an honor student as a senior. In his senior season, he recorded 159 tackles and 5.5 sacks, and also picked off four passes and returned three for scores. Allen was named third-team all-state Class 6A, and was looking forward to a scholarship offer by University of Florida in Gainesville, just down the Interstate 75 from Lake City. However, he was not recruited by the Gators, and eventually chose Florida State over Virginia Tech, South Carolina, and Clemson.

== College career ==
After redshirting his first year in Tallahassee, Allen played all 12 games of the 1997 season as a back-up to Lamont Green and Deon Humphrey at strongside linebacker and on special teams. He finished fifth among FSU linebackers with 26 total tackles (10 solo). His season-best performance came in the 50–7 victory over Maryland, with five tackles, including one for loss.

In his sophomore year, Allen played in 11 games and finished sixth on the team with 57 tackles (31 solo), including six for a loss of yardage and three quarterback sacks. Two of those came in the 26–14 win over in-state rival Miami (FL). His best game of the season, however, came in the 23–12 win over the Seminoles' other in-state rival, the Florida Gators. Allen was responsible for the only sack of Gators quarterback Doug Johnson, and added four tackles and two pass deflections, a performance for which he was named the Tomahawk Player of the Game by the coaching staff.

As a junior, emerged as one of the top linebackers in the Atlantic Coast Conference. Starting all eleven games, he finished second on the team with 101 total tackles, behind only Tommy Polley and ahead of Bradley Jennings, which made them the first linebacker trio to lead the Seminoles in tackles since Daryl Bush, Derrick Brooks, and Sam Cowart in 1994. In six games, Allen had at least ten tackles, with a season-high 14 tackles in Florida State's regular season ending 30–23 win over Florida. Allen also made eight tackles for loss and broke up two passes, and ranked second on the team with five quarterback sacks, behind only Jamal Reynolds (7.0). He was named was named second-team All-ACC.

In his senior year, Allen tied Jennings for most tackles on the team with 102 on the season. He also accounted for six quarterback hurries, ten pass-breakups (second-best on the team behind Tay Cody's twelve), two fumble recoveries and also had an interception in the 37–3 win over Virginia.

== Professional career ==
Pre-draft measurables
Height	Weight	Arm length	Hand span	40-yard dash	Bench press
6 ft 0 1/8 in (1.83 m)	238 lb (108 kg)	31 1/2 in (0.80 m)	9 in (0.23 m)	4.65 s	25 reps
All values from NFL Combine

Allen was selected in the third round (83rd overall) in the 2001 NFL draft by the St. Louis Rams. He played three games during his rookie season, and was later allocated to the Houston Texans in the 2002 NFL expansion draft. However, he was released by the Texans before playing a game for the team. He was signed off waivers to the Carolina Panthers in 2002. He played mostly on special teams for the Panthers and was part of the unit that ranked fifth in the NFL in 2003. He was released by the Panthers and was signed to the Redskins on April 6, 2005. He was released by the Redskins in late 2005 due to a knee injury after the other play put him down.

== NFL career statistics ==
Legend
**Bold**	Career high

=== Regular season ===
Year	Team	Games		Tackles					Interceptions					Fumbles			
Year	Team	GP	GS	Cmb	Solo	Ast	Sck	TFL	Int	Yds	TD	Lng	PD	FF	FR	Yds	TD
2001	STL	3	0	1	1	0	0.0	0	0	0	0	0	0	0	0	0	0
2002	CAR	**16**	**5**	**37**	**31**	6	0.0	**2**	0	0	0	0	1	0	0	0	0
2003	CAR	14	4	35	25	**10**	**1.0**	1	0	0	0	0	**2**	0	**1**	0	0
2004	CAR	14	0	22	17	5	0.0	0	**1**	**21**	0	**21**	1	0	0	0	0
		47	9	95	74	21	1.0	3	1	21	0	21	4	0	1	0	0

=== Playoffs ===
Year	Team	Games		Tackles					Interceptions					Fumbles			
Year	Team	GP	GS	Cmb	Solo	Ast	Sck	TFL	Int	Yds	TD	Lng	PD	FF	FR	Yds	TD
2003	CAR	**4**	0	**2**	**2**	0	0.0	0	0	0	0	0	0	0	0	0	0
		4	0	2	2	0	0.0	0	0	0	0	0	0	0	0	0	0

== Post-playing career ==
Then Allen worked at Lyman High School. He worked as a Coach and American History Teacher at Lake Howell High School. He was recently selected as head coach for the Columbia High School Tigers in Lake City where he graduated from and played high school football. He got 100 wins with the Columbia High School Tigers when they defeated Trinity Christian Academy (Jacksonville, FL) 27-20 on September 19, 2025.
