= Gene Cox =

American football player and coach (1935–2009)

- Coach Gene Cox

Biographical details
- Born: 1934; Lake City, Florida
- Died: March 30, 2009

Playing career
- 1954–1955: Florida State

Coaching career (HC unless noted)
- 1963–1990: Leon High School

Gene Calvin Cox was a football coach at Leon High School in Tallahassee, Florida, United States. Over his 38-year career at four schools, his teams won 313 games, a feat that has not been duplicated as of 2006. In 1988, he was inducted into the State of Florida Sports Hall of Fame. In 1998, the City of Tallahassee renamed the local high school football stadium Gene Cox Stadium.

Cox received his bachelor's degree from Florida State University in 1956 after playing on the 1954 and 1955 Florida State Seminole football teams.

He died on March 30, 2009, at age 74.

== Head coaching record ==
Yea	Team	Record	Playoff Result
1963	Leon High School	4-6-0	
1964	Leon High School	8-3-0	
1965	Leon High School	6-4-0	
1966	Leon High School	6-3-2	
1967	Leon High School	10-1-0	
1968	Leon High School	6-3-1	
1969	Leon High School	13-0-0	State Champions
1970	Leon High School	11-1-0	
1971	Leon High School	6-4-0	
1972	Leon High School	12-1-0	State Runner-Up
1973	Leon High School	9-1-1	
1974	Leon High School	13-0-0	State Champions
1975	Leon High School	12-2-0	State Runner-Up
1976	Leon High School	7-3-0	
1977	Leon High School	8-3-0	
1978	Leon High School	8-3-0	
1979	Leon High School	9-2-0	
1980	Leon High School	9-1-0	
1981	Leon High School	11-1-0	
1982	Leon High School	11-1-0	
1983	Leon High School	7-4-0	
1984	Leon High School	10-1-0	
1985	Leon High School	10-1-0	
1986	Leon High School	7-3-0	
1987	Leon High School	7-3-0	
1988	Leon High School	9-2-0	
1989	Leon High School	3-7-0	
1990	Leon High School	6-4-0	
Overall Record		238-68-4	
