= Fort White, Florida =

Town in the state of Florida, United States

- Town
- Town of Fort White
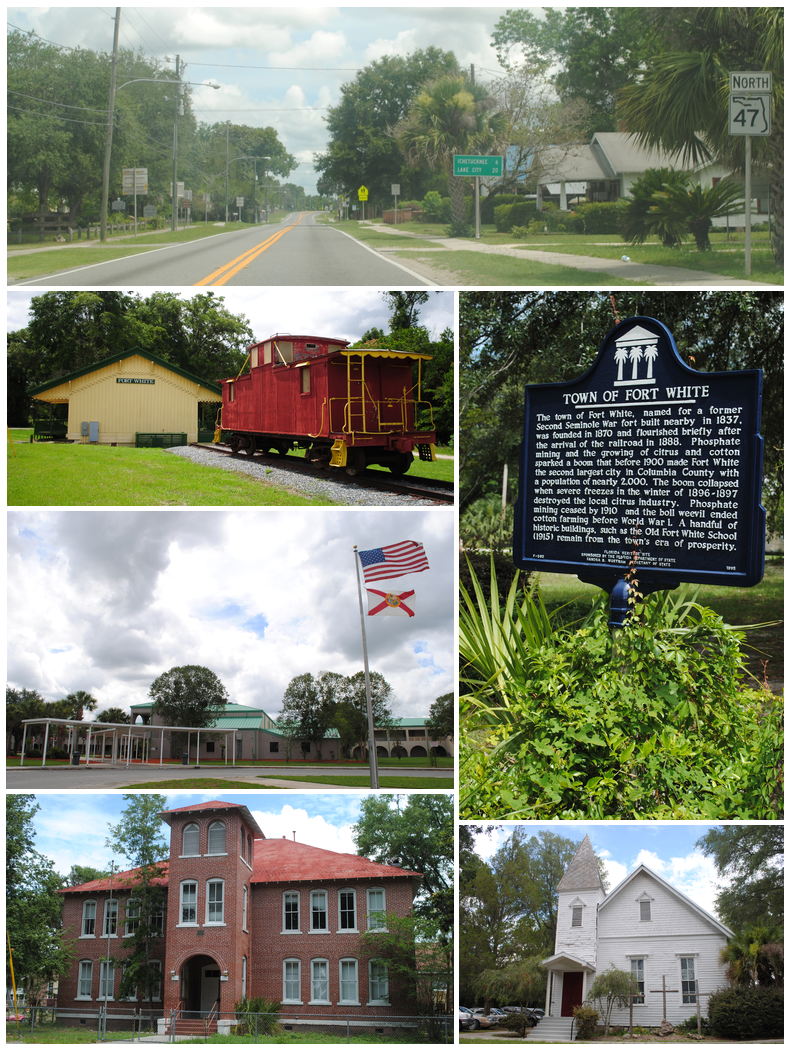
- Top, left to right: Florida State Road 47 in Fort White, Fort White Train Depot, Fort White High School, Town of Fort White Historical Marker, Fort White Public School Historic District, Fort White United Methodist Church

- Seal
- Motto: "Home of the Ichetucknee River"
- Location in Columbia County and the state of Florida
- Coordinates: 29°55′21″N 82°42′49″W
- Country: United States
- State: Florida
- County: Columbia
- Settled: 1836
- Incorporated: 1884

Government
  - Type: Mayor-Council
  - Mayor: George Jacob Thomas
  - Councilors: Lonnie Wayne Harrell, Monica Merricks, Kathryn Terry, and William "Bill" Koon
  - Town Clerk: Kelly MacPherson
  - Town Attorney: Lindsey B. Lander

Area
  - Total: 2.41 sq mi (6.25 km^{2})
  - Land: 2.41 sq mi (6.25 km^{2})
  - Water: 0 sq mi (0.00 km^{2})
- Elevation: 72 ft (22 m)

Population (2020)
  - Total: 618
  - Density: 256.0/sq mi (98.86/km^{2})
- Time zone: UTC-5 (Eastern (EST))
  - Summer (DST): UTC-4 (EDT)
- ZIP code: 32038
- Area code: 386
- FIPS code: 12-24500
- GNIS feature ID: 2406511
- Website: fortwhitefl.com

Fort White is a town in Columbia County, Florida, United States, named after a military fort built in the 1830s. It is the closest town to Ichetucknee Springs State Park. Fort White High School and the Fort White Public School Historic District are located within the town's borders. The original school building was constructed in 1915. As of the 2020 census, the population of Fort White was 618, up from 567 at the 2010 census. It is part of the Lake City, Florida Micropolitan Statistical Area.

== History ==
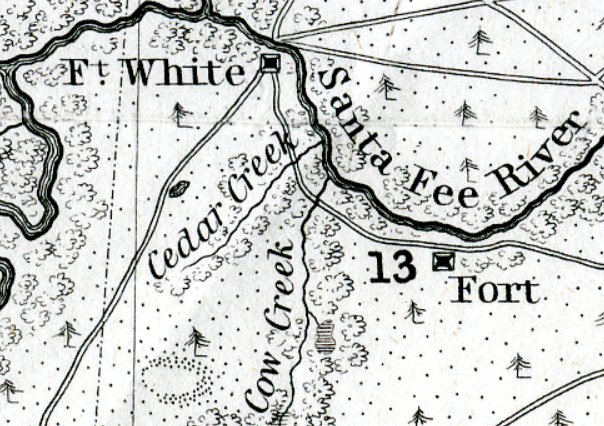
Excerpt from A Map of the Seat of War in Florida showing the fort location of Ft. White in 1839.

Fort White was originally constructed as a military fort during the Second Seminole War in 1836 to protect the Cow Creek settlement. Supplies were brought in by steamboat on the Santa Fe River and distributed to other area forts. Due to sickness, flooding along the river, and rumors of the railroad coming to the area, the settlement was moved 4 miles (6 km) east to its present location. The area of the original fort became the Fort White Wildlife and Environmental Area in 1997.

A prominent Second Seminole War leader, Halpatter Tustenuggee (Alligator Warrior) or "Chief Alligator", of Alligator Town (known as Alpata Telophka or Halapata Telofa in its indigenous language), now known as Lake City, is buried at Tustenuggee Methodist Cemetery near Fort White. Before it was incorporated as Lake City, the white settlers called the community "Alligator", which was the partial English translation of the Native American community.

Named after the military fort, in 1884, the Town of Fort White was officially incorporated as a municipality and grew steadily, following the arrival of the railroad in 1888. Phosphate mining, turpentine and agriculture (cotton and oranges) were the foundation of the economy, and the population grew to nearly 2,000. The boom turned to bust as severe freezes in the winters of 1896 and 1897 destroyed the local citrus industry. By 1910, the largest phosphate deposits were depleted, and mining ceased. The boll weevil ended cotton farming before World War I, and the population shrank to a few hundred people, primarily farmers, ranchers, and foresters. The town's population in 1979 was 365.

== Geography ==
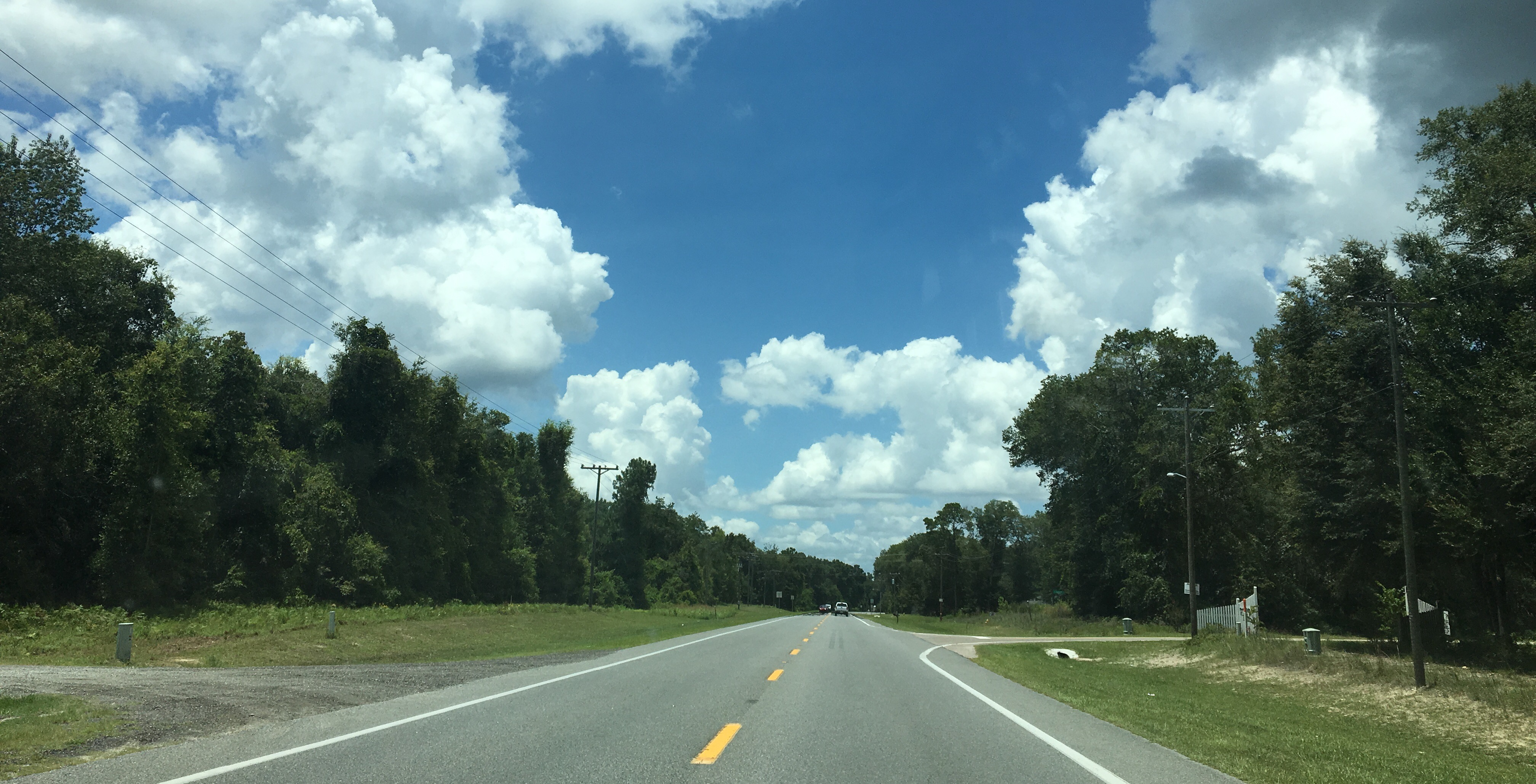
U.S. Route 27 in Fort White

The Town of Fort White is located in southern Columbia County at the intersection of U.S. Route 27 and Florida State Road 47. SR 47 leads north 20 miles (32 km) to Lake City, the Columbia County seat, and south 23 miles (37 km) to Trenton. US 27 leads southeast 16 miles (26 km) to Alachua and Interstate 75, and west 13 miles (21 km) to Branford.

According to the United States Census Bureau, Fort White has a total area of 2.4 square miles (6.2 km^{2}), all land. Most of the land surrounding the town is family farms and/or forests.

=== The Ichetucknee River ===
Locals have long known of and enjoyed the crystal clear Ichetucknee River and springs, 4 miles (6 km) northwest of the town. Before 1970, the existence and location of this natural wonder were not widely known outside the area and the road to the spring was not paved, nor was it marked, because the spring was on private property.

In 1970, the state of Florida purchased the 2,241 acres (907 ha) of Ichetucknee spring and river property from the Loncala Phosphate Corporation. The property became the Ichetucknee Springs State Park. Columbia County built a paved road, number 238, providing easier access to the springs. In 1972, the head spring of the river was declared a National Natural Landmark by the U.S. Department of the Interior. The main tributary from Ichetucknee Springs became one of the most popular tubing destinations in the world, attracting up to 5,000 visitors each day during the summer. Others came to the river to swim, picnic, snorkel, scuba dive, and explore the nearby forests.

== Climate ==
The climate in this area is characterized by hot, humid summers and generally mild winters. According to the Köppen climate classification, the Town of Fort White has a humid subtropical climate zone (Cfa).

== Demographics ==
Historical population
Census	Pop.	Note	%±
1890	376		—
1900	600		59.6%
1910	329		−45.2%
1920	360		9.4%
1930	272		−24.4%
1940	317		16.5%
1950	329		3.8%
1960	425		29.2%
1970	365		−14.1%
1980	386		5.8%
1990	268		−30.6%
2000	409		52.6%
2010	567		38.6%
2020	618		9.0%
U.S. Decennial Census

=== 2010 and 2020 census ===
Fort White racial composition (Hispanics excluded from racial categories) (NH = Non-Hispanic)
Race	Pop 2010	Pop 2020	% 2010	% 2020
White (NH)	334	406	58.91%	65.70%
Black or African American (NH)	171	149	30.16%	24.11%
Native American or Alaska Native (NH)	4	2	0.71%	0.32%
Asian (NH)	3	5	0.53%	0.81%
Pacific Islander or Native Hawaiian (NH)	0	1	0.00%	0.16%
Some other race (NH)	1	2	0.18%	0.32%
Two or more races/Multiracial (NH)	12	12	2.12%	1.94%
Hispanic or Latino (any race)	42	41	7.41%	6.63%
Total	567	618		

As of the 2020 United States census, there were 618 people, 214 households, and 164 families residing in the town.

As of the 2010 United States census, there were 567 people, 311 households, and 169 families residing in the town.

=== 2000 census ===
As of the census of 2000, there were 409 people, 151 households, and 104 families residing in the town. The population density was 176.8 inhabitants per square mile (68.3/km^{2}). There were 184 housing units at an average density of 79.5 per square mile (30.7/km^{2}). The racial makeup of the town was 50.61% White, 46.70% African American, 0.24% Native American, 0.49% Asian, 0.24% Pacific Islander, and 1.71% from two or more races. Hispanic or Latino of any race were 3.42% of the population.

In 2000, there were 151 households, out of which 33.8% had children under the age of 18 living with them, 43.7% were married couples living together, 19.2% had a female householder with no husband present, and 31.1% were non-families. 28.5% of all households were made up of individuals, and 9.9% had someone living alone who was 65 years of age or older. The average household size was 2.71 and the average family size was 3.35.

In 2000, in the town, the population was spread out, with 28.6% under the age of 18, 8.1% from 18 to 24, 24.9% from 25 to 44, 22.5% from 45 to 64, and 15.9% who were 65 years of age or older. The median age was 37 years. For every 100 females, there were 76.3 males. For every 100 females age 18 and over, there were 82.5 males.

In 2000, the median income for a household in the town was $26,250, and the median income for a family was $28,000. Males had a median income of $26,477 versus $26,667 for females. The per capita income for the town was $10,578. About 24.1% of families and 26.8% of the population were below the poverty line, including 23.0% of those under age 18 and 42.0% of those age 65 or over.

== Government services ==
The town elects a mayor and four town council members who meet once each month. Water is provided through the city, but all residents utilize a septic tank system for sewerage. Law enforcement is provided by the Columbia County Sheriff's Office who utilize a sub-station within the city limits. Fire protection is provided by the Columbia County Fire Department. Garbage collection is subcontracted to a private company. The Fort White Branch of the Columbia County Public Library system, which was previously located next to town hall, is across from Fort White High School. The county health clinic has a satellite office in Fort White which is open one day each week, but the nearest hospital facility is in Lake City.

The Fort White Sports Complex was constructed in 2005 on 25 acres (10 ha) abutting the high school. Facilities include six baseball fields, two basketball courts and two tennis courts. A community center was built on the site in 2008. A senior citizen meal program operates at the center on weekdays.

== Schools ==
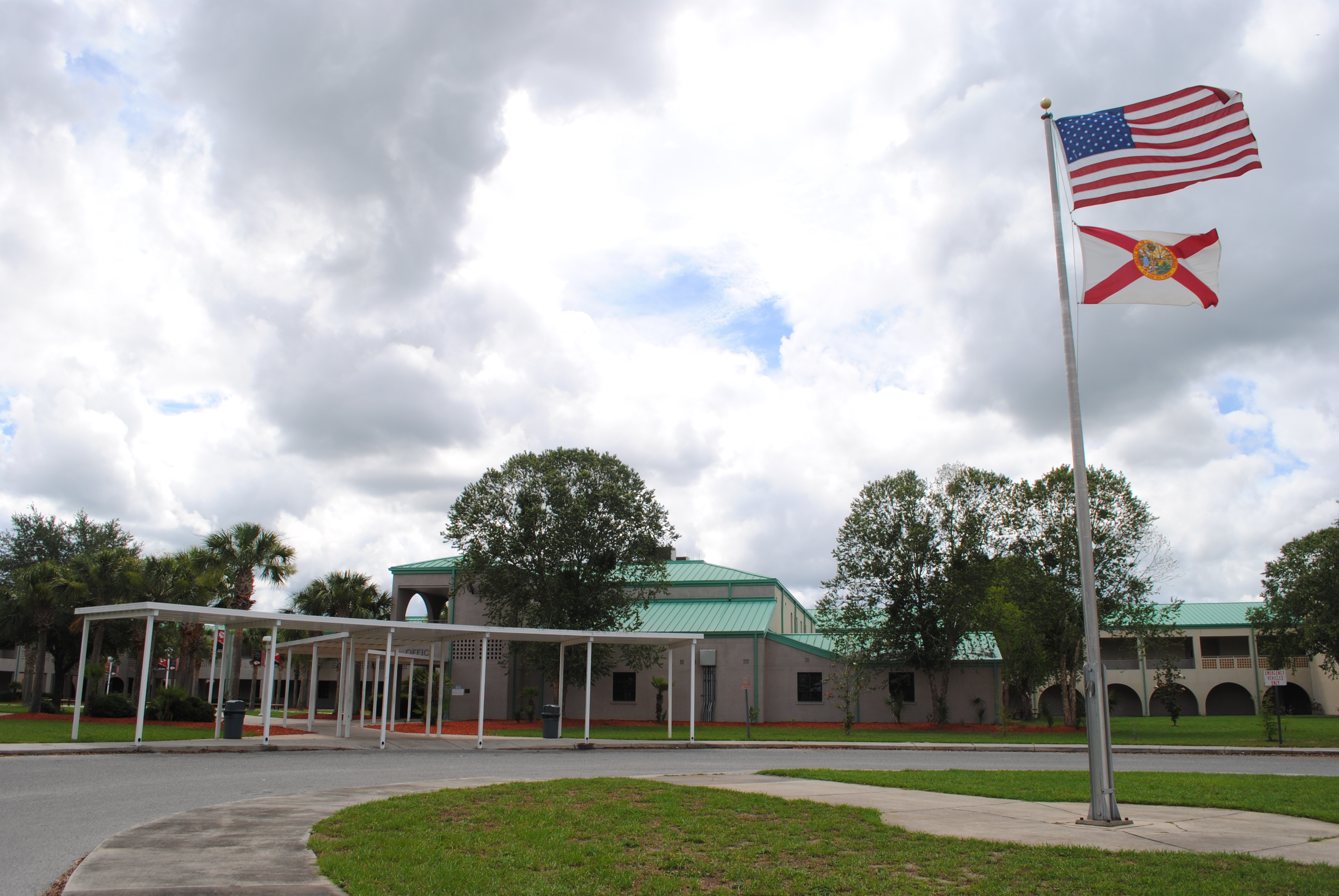
Fort White High School

The public schools located within the Town of Fort White are served by the Columbia County School District.

- Fort White Elementary School
- Fort White Middle School
- Fort White High School

The original Fort White High School was constructed during 1915, and an auditorium was added in 1936. Separate elementary school classrooms were completed in 1938.

The last high school class to graduate was in 1969, about the same time desegregation and integration forced the closing of the black schools in the area. At that time, there weren't enough children to justify a high school in Fort White; students in grades 9–12 were bused 20 miles (32 km) to Columbia High School in Lake City for over 30 years. After Ichetucknee Springs State Park opened in 1971, the population in the south end of the county steadily grew to the point where the need for a local facility was substantiated.

A $25 million high school was completed in December 2000 for grades 6–12 after opening in August 2000 in temporary buildings because of construction delays. The school had been scheduled for completion in August 2000. Fort White High School graduated the first class in a generation in 2001. A new Fort White Middle School for grade 6 was completed prior to the 2008–2009 school year. The rest of the middle school (for grades 7 and 8) has been finished and is in use, though the middle and high school are still joined.
