= Columbia County School District =

School district in Florida, United States

Address
- 372 West Duval Street Lake City, Columbia, Florida, 32055-3990; United States
- Coordinates: 30.188946°N 82.641628°W

District information
- Type: Public
- Grades: Pre-school - 12, adult
- Superintendent: Alex Carswell
- Chair of the board: Dana Brady~Giddens
- Accreditation: AdvancED

Students and staff
- Students: 9,785
- Student–teacher ratio: 20:1

Other information
- Math proficiency: 56%
- Reading proficiency: 53%
- Website: www.columbiak12.com

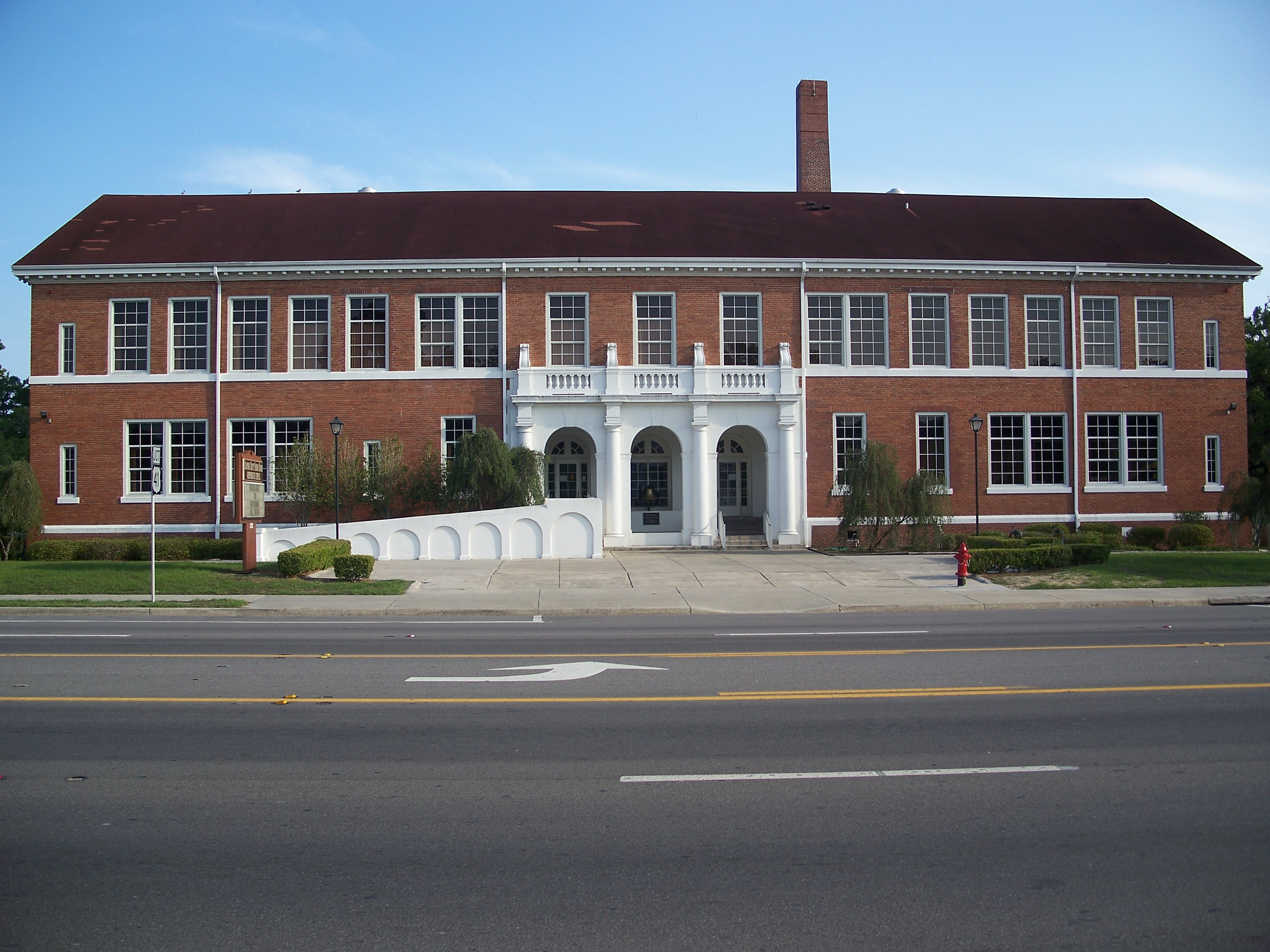
The former Columbia County High School serves as the district headquarters

The Columbia County School District (CCSD) is a school district based in Lake City, Florida that encompasses the entire 801 square miles (2,074.58 km^{2}) of the county. The district is controlled jointly by the five members of the Columbia County School Board and the Superintendent of Schools, both elected by county voters. The CCSD currently operates a total of 14 schools: 7 elementary schools, 2 middle schools, 2 high schools, an alternative school, a virtual school and an adult education center. The district's offices are located in the historic Columbia County High School building, constructed in 1921, at 372 West Duval Street.

High schools in the district include Fort White High School and Columbia High School. Middle schools are Lake City Middle School in Lake City and Richardson Sixth Grade Academy in Lake City. Fort White High School includes grades 6-8. The district's elementary schools are Columbia City Elementary, Eastside Elementary, Fort White Elementary, Niblack Elementary, Pinemount Elementary, Summers Elementary and Westside Elementary. The elementary schools are located in Lake City except for Fort White Elementary in Fort White and Columbia City Elementary between Lake City and Fort White. Alternative school Pathways Academy serves K-12 in Lake City.

== Superintendent ==
The Superintendent of Schools is Alex L. Carswell, Jr.

== Accreditation ==
The Columbia County School District is accredited by AdvancED.

== Other education ==
The school district also provides Career and Adult Education services for residents:

- Adult Education helps students who want to earn a GED or a High School diploma, acquire academic skills required for employment or subsequent training, or who wish to become literate.
- The Even Start program helps parents establish a good learning environment for their children, which also improves their own educational and parenting skills to promote family literacy.
- Career and Technical Education helps students and working adults explore interests and vocations, acquire employability skills, and experience contextual learning.
- Project NET assists individuals in the transition from GED to college or technical training.
