= Bradley Jennings =

American football player (1977–2025)

No. 44
- Position: Linebacker

Personal information
- Born: December 2, 1977; Miami, Florida, U.S.
- Died: May 28, 2025 (aged 47); Jacksonville, Florida, U.S.
- Listed height: 6 ft 3 in (1.91 m)
- Listed weight: 255 lb (116 kg)

Career information
- High school: Carol City (Miami)
- College: Florida State
- NFL draft: 2002: undrafted

Awards and highlights
- BCS national champion (1999); First-team All-ACC (2001); The Sporting News fourth-team All-American (2001)

Bradley Fanelon Jennings (December 2, 1977 – May 28, 2025) was an American college football player who was a linebacker for the Florida State Seminoles.

== Biography ==
A native of Miami, Jennings attended Carol City High School, where he was a first-team Class 6A linebacker as a senior. Jennings led the Chiefs in tackles and had a dominating performance in the 1996 state championship win over Tampa Hillsborough. He was rated as the No. 3 linebacker in Florida by the Florida Times-Union, and selected FSU over Auburn and West Virginia.

An All-Conference linebacker leading the Seminoles in tackles as a senior, Jennings was regarded as an NFL draft prospect, until just three weeks before the 2002 NFL draft, on March 30, 2002, he was near-fatally shot twice in the right shoulder by a jittery carjacker. He eventually went undrafted and never played in the NFL.

Jennings settled in Jacksonville, Florida, and became an assistant football coach at Mandarin High School. In November 2009, he was charged with aggravated assault after a failed attempt to rob a Check 'n Go store in the Southside neighborhood of Jacksonville. Jennings claimed it was pre-Halloween prank.

Jennings held the linebacker coaching spot at Sandalwood High School where his son Branden attends.

Jennings died on May 28, 2025, at the age of 47.
