= Columbia High School (Florida) =

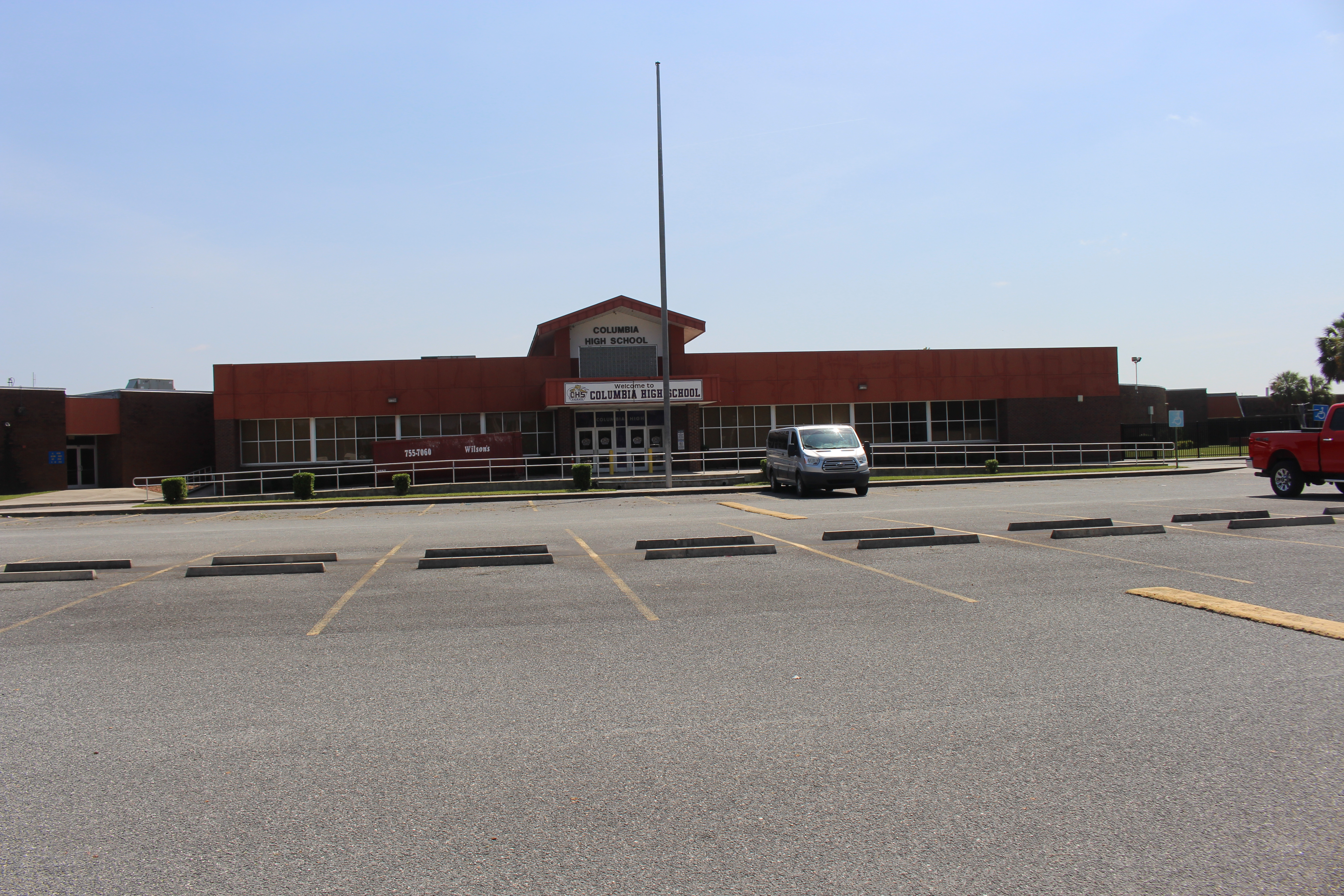

Location
- 469 SE Fighting Tiger Drive; Lake City, Florida 32025; United States; 30°08′53″N 82°38′12″W

Information
- Type: Public
- Founded: 1888
- School district: Columbia County School District
- Principal: Trey Hosford
- Teaching staff: 76.41 (on an FTE basis)
- Enrollment: 1,727 (2023–2024)
- Student to teacher ratio: 22.60
- Colors: Purple and Gold
- Fight song: Onward Victorious
- Nickname: Tigers
- Rival: Suwannee High School, Gainesville High School
- Yearbook: The Columbian
- Feeder schools: Lake City Middle School
- Website: chs.columbiak12.com

Columbia High School (CHS) is a four-year public high school located in Lake City, Florida. The school's mascot is the Fighting Tigers and the colors are purple and gold. Sports Illustrated magazine profiled the school and town in a September 2021 article, "Football and Community Come Together in Lake City".

== History ==
The school was founded in 1888 as Columbia County High School. The 1921 building is on the National Register of Historic Places. In 1935 the school was accused of cheating in football by playing a 21-year-old student who lived outside the county. A judge ordered them to be suspended from the Athletic Association and cancelled the rest of their games.

Enrollment increased following World War II and in 1957 a new building opened on Pennsylvania Avenue named, Columbia High School. Between 1950 and 1970, the population in the city and county had increased by 50%, outgrowing the relatively new school. Portable classrooms are added and a new campus was constructed south of the city, opening in 1975.

Over the last fifty years, the campus has experienced extensive changes and remodeling. The original building remains, but other structures have been added and replaced: the auditorium, gymnasium, cafeteria and eight portable classrooms. Athletic facilities include a football stadium, a fieldhouse, soccer and baseball fields and tennis courts.

=== Integration ===
Prior to 1969, Columbia was for White students only. In 1969, when the schools were forced to integrate by federal courts, students from the all-Black Fort White High School were sent to Columbia High School, but the district did not fully integrate Columbia at that time and defied a federal court order to do so in January, 1970. The court allowed them to delay until February. Students from Fort White continued to attend Columbia for over 30 years, when a new Fort White High School was built. In 1979, a Black student was accused of improper behavior towards a White female. The Black student was suspended, which led to a boycott of the school by Black students, and McKinley Jeffers, a Black assistant principal was fired.

=== Censorship ===
In 1986, despite opposition from the ACLU, the school district banned Chaucer's The Miller's Tale and Aristophanes Lysistrata from the school because of sexual content. This decision was ultimately upheld by the courts in 1989 in the case Virgil v. School Board of Columbia County. A 1993 attempt to ban Of Mice and Men by John Steinbeck was defeated due to the intervention of a local librarian.

== Activities ==
Extra curricular activities at the school include the FIRST Tech Challenge team The Flying Tigers, the Academy of Graphic Design, Academic Team, Athletics, Band, Color Guard, and two chapters of Future Farmers of America. The football program lists regional championships in 1969, 1998 & 2003; made it to the Quarter-Finals in 1975, 1982, 1984, 1988, 1990, 1995, 1999, 2001 & 2002, and one State Championship victory in 1967.

The Columbia High School Marching Band has been ranked superior in the Florida Bandmasters Association's Marching Performance Assessment for 16 years. The CHS Drumline has a long lasting record of superiors at the State level, they've received 5 straight, as of 2023.

Columbia high football has been an important part of the community since it began, it won a state title back in 1967, and were runners-up in 1964 and 1997. It was at one time, the winningest program in the state of Florida.

Columbia high athletics have been competitive over the years winning a total of 8 state titles, and producing many notable alumni in its past. As is typical in the south, the community strongly supports their teams.

== Sports ==
=== State championships ===
- Boys Basketball: 1947 (Class B)
- Boys Track: 2002 (Class 3A)
- Boys Weightlifting: 1996, 1998, 1999, 2026
- Boys Football: 1967 (Class A)
- Girls Softball 2013 (Class 5A), 2026 (Class 4A)

== Notable alumni ==
- Scott Adams, National Football League (NFL) offensive lineman
- Brian Allen, NFL linebacker
- Jerome Carter, NFL strong safety for the St. Louis Rams. At Columbia, Carter was named the top player in the state by The Gainesville Sun, and the Class 5A Player of the Year by the Florida Association of Coaches.
- Fred P. Cone, American politician who served as the 27th Governor of Florida.
- Gene Cox, former High school coach who graduated from Columbia High and coached at Leon High School and attained a total of 313 wins and was at the time one of the winningest coaches in Florida.
- Shayne Edge, Former American football punter who played college at Florida and in the NFL with the Pittsburgh Steelers
- Grace Elizabeth, American model
- Amare Ferrell, college football safety for the Indiana Hoosiers
- Bobby Fulton, wide receiver for the defending National Champions
- Sampson Genus, NFL center for the Green Bay Packers
- Yatil Green, American football wide receiver at the University of Miami, selected by the Miami Dolphins in the first round (15th overall pick) of the 1997 NFL Draft.
- Randy Jackson (offensive lineman), Former American football offensive tackle who played college at Florida and in the NFL for the Chicago Bears
- Timmy Jernigan, NFL defensive lineman. Played college football at Florida State.
- Michael Kirkman, pitcher for the Texas Rangers
- Trey Marshall, safety for the Denver Broncos
- Kendyll Pope, former NFL linebacker who played for the Indianapolis Colts. At Columbia, Pope was selected for the USA Today All-American first team and as a Parade All-American.
- Pat Summerall, an All-State selection in football and basketball for Columbia High School in the 1940s and the 1946 individual state tennis runner-up. Played 10 seasons in the NFL for the then-Chicago Cardinals and the New York Giants, before starting his career as a broadcaster.
- Laremy Tunsil, American football offensive lineman who played college at Ole Miss, he was then selected by the Miami Dolphins in the first round (13th overall pick) of the 2016 NFL draft.
- Reinard Wilson, American football linebacker in the National Football League. He was drafted by the Cincinnati Bengals 14th overall in the 1997 NFL Draft. He played college football at Florida State.
