= Peonage =

Social category

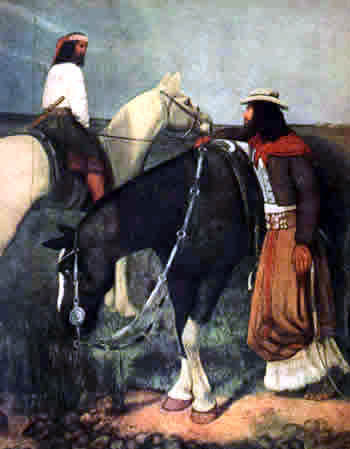
Foreman and country peon by Prilidiano Pueyrredón (1823 - 1870)

Peonage is any form of wage labor, financial exploitation, coercive economic practice, or policy in which the victim or a laborer (peon) has little control over employment or economic conditions. A peon (English /ˈpiːɒn/, from the Spanish peón Spanish pronunciation: [peˈon]) is anyone subject to peonage. Peons and peonage existed both in the colonial period and in the post-colonial period of Latin America, as well as the period after the end of slavery in the United States, when "Black Codes" were passed to retain African-American freedmen as labor through other means.

In Bolivia, indigenous populations were subject to the Mit'a system during the rule of the Inca and Spanish empires. Later this was replaced by a peonage known as pongaje that lasted until the mid-twentieth century. In Chile peonage took the local form of inquilinaje and lasted until the Chilean land reform in the 1960s. In Ecuador a similar practise was that of the huasipungos.

== Usage ==
In English, peon (doublet of pawn) and peonage have meanings related to their Spanish etymology (foot soldier); a peon may be defined as a person with little authority, often assigned unskilled tasks; an underling or any person subjected to capricious or unreasonable oversight. In this sense, peon can be used in either a derogatory or self-effacing context.

There are similar usages in contemporary cultures:

- South Asian dialects of English: a peon is an office boy, an attendant, or an orderly, a person kept around for odd jobs (and, historically, a policeman or foot soldier).
- Shanghai: among native Chinese working in firms where English is spoken, the word refers to a worker with little authority, who suffers indignities from superiors.

However, the term has a historical basis and usage related to much more severe conditions of forced labor:

- American English: in a historical and legal sense, peon generally referred to someone working in a compelled labor system (known as peonage). The term often refers to debt bondage or indentured servitude.

== History ==
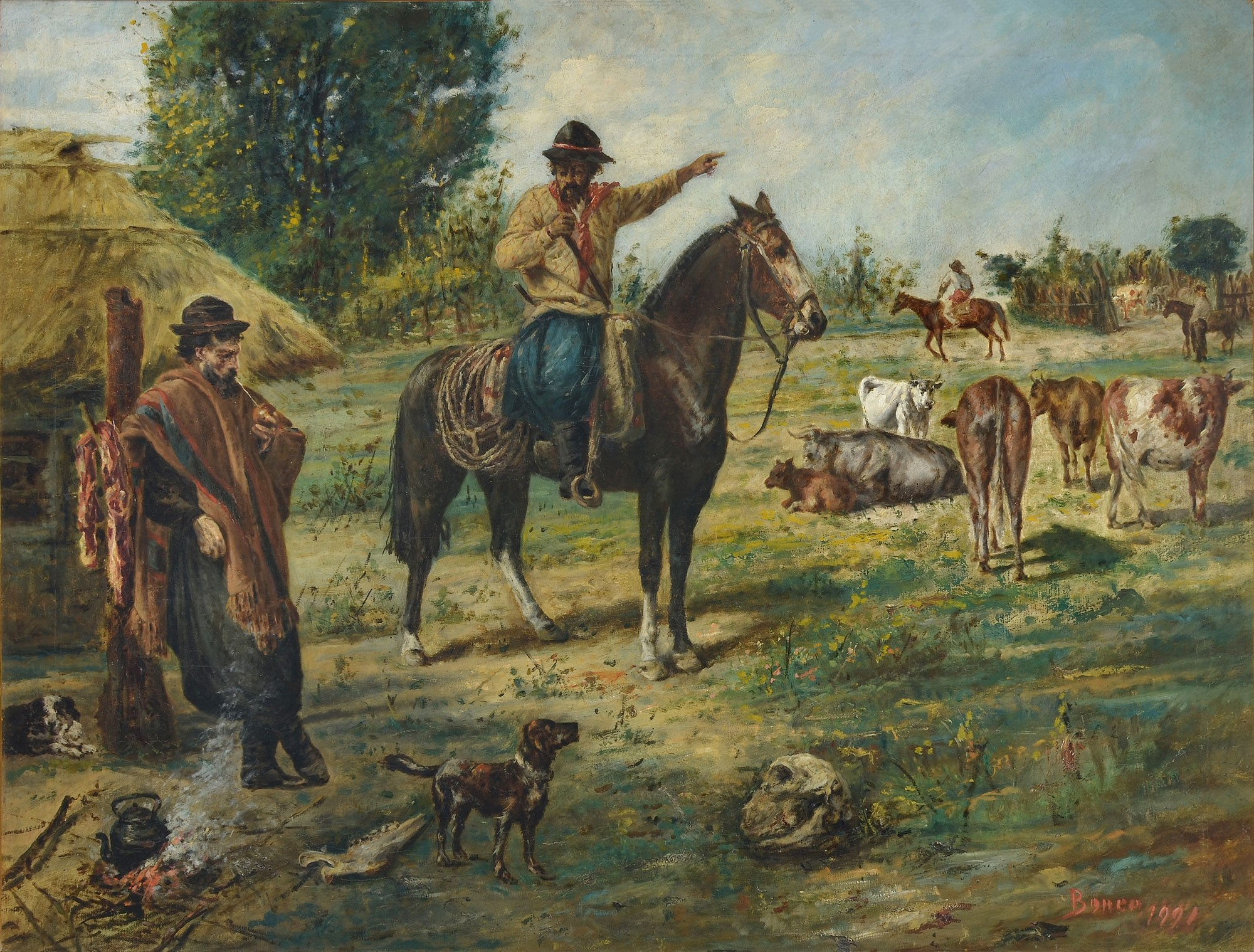
Foreman and rebel peon by Martín León Boneo, 1901.

The Spanish conquest of Mexico and Caribbean islands included peonage; the conquistadors forced natives to work for Spanish planters and mine operators. Peonage was prevalent in Latin America, especially in the countries of Mexico, Guatemala, Ecuador and Peru. It remains an important part of social life, as among the Urarina of the Peruvian Amazon.

== Peonage in the United States ==
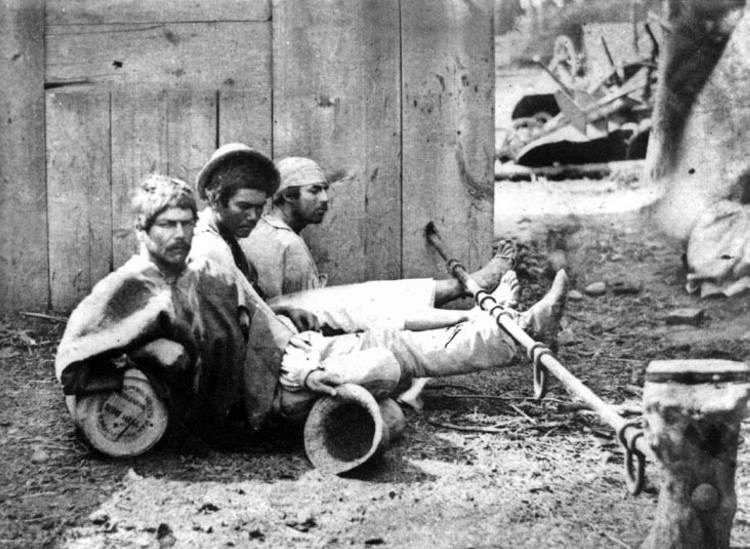
Punishment of peons employed by American railroad tycoon Henry Meiggs in Chile or Peru, 1862

After the American Civil War of 1861–1865, peonage developed in the Southern United States. Poor white farmers and formerly enslaved African Americans known as freedmen, who could not afford their own land, would farm another person's land, exchanging labor for a share of the crops. This was called sharecropping. The land owner would pay for the seeds and tools in exchange for a percentage of the money earned from the crop and a portion of the crop. As time passed, many landowners began to abuse this system. The landowner would force the tenant farmer or sharecropper to buy seeds and tools from the land owner's store, which often had inflated prices. As sharecroppers were often illiterate, they had to depend on the books and accounting by the landowner and his staff. Other tactics included debiting expenses against the sharecropper's profits after the crop was harvested and "miscalculating" the net profit from the harvest, thereby keeping the sharecropper in perpetual debt to the landowner. Because the tenant farmers could not offset the costs, they were forced into involuntary labor due to the debts they owed the landowner. Additionally, unpredictable or disruptive climatic conditions, such as droughts or storms, caused disruptions to seasonal plantings or harvests, which in turn, caused the tenant farmers to accrue debts with the landowners.

After the U.S. Civil War, former slave states in the South passed "Black Codes", laws to control freed black slaves. Vagrancy laws were included in these Black Codes. Homeless or unemployed African Americans who were between jobs, most of whom were former slaves, were arrested and fined as vagrants. Usually lacking the resources to pay the fine, the "vagrant" was sent to county labor or hired out under the convict lease program to a private employer. The authorities also tried to restrict the movement of freedmen between rural areas and cities, to between towns.

Under such laws, local officials arbitrarily arrested tens of thousands of people and charged them with fines and court costs of their cases. Black freedmen were those most aggressively targeted. Poor whites were also arrested, but usually in much smaller numbers. White merchants, farmers, and business owners were allowed to pay these debts, and the prisoner had to work off the debt. Prisoners were leased as laborers to owners and operators of coal mines, lumber camps, brickyards, railroads, quarries, and farm plantations, with the lease revenues for their labor going to the states. The lessors were responsible for room and board of the laborers, and frequently abused them with little oversight by the state. Government officials leased imprisoned blacks and whites to small town entrepreneurs, provincial farmers, and dozens of corporations looking for cheap labor. Their labor was repeatedly bought and sold for decades, well into the 20th century, long after the official abolition of American slavery.

Southern states and private businesses profited by this form of unpaid labor. It is estimated that at the beginning of the 20th century, up to 40% of blacks in the South were trapped in peonage. Overseers and owners often used severe physical deprivation, beatings, whippings, and other abuse as "discipline" against the workers.

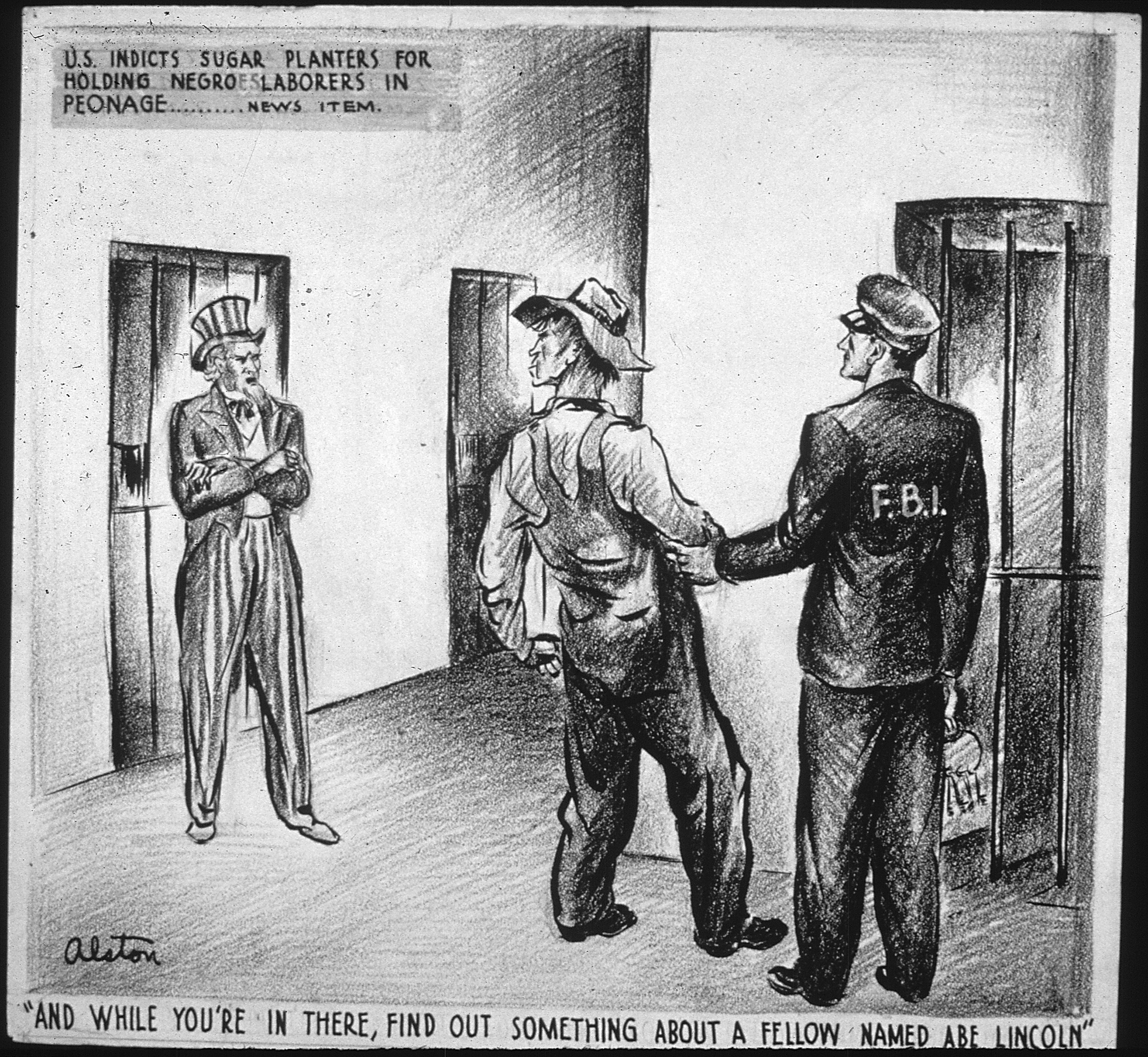
Cartoon of Indictment of US Planters and negro peonage

After the Civil War, the Thirteenth Amendment prohibited involuntary servitude such as peonage for all but convicted criminals. Congress also passed various laws to protect the constitutional rights of Southern blacks, making those who violated such rights by conspiracy, by trespass, or in disguise, guilty of an offense punishable by ten years in prison and civil disability. Unlawful use of state law to subvert rights under the Federal Constitution was made punishable by fine or a year's imprisonment. But even after federal sentencing to “hard labor” was abolished by Congress and president Lyndon B. Johnson by Public Law 89-486 on August 6, 1966, thereby narrowing the “Southern exception” to the 13th Amendment’s prohibition of involuntary servitude, sharecroppers in Southern states were forced to continue working to pay off old debts or to pay taxes. Southern states allowed this in order to preserve sharecropping.

The following reported court cases involved peonage:

- 1903 – South Dakota, a 17-year-old girl was reported to have been sold into peonage at the age of two by her own father
- 1904 – Alabama, ten persons indicted for holding black and white persons in peonage
- 1906 – John W. Pace of Alabama, the "father" of peonage; pardoned by his friend President Theodore Roosevelt.
- 1906 – Five officials of Jackson Lumber Company sentenced in Pensacola, Florida, to prison terms ranging from 13 months to 18 months. One of the defendants was fined $5,000, while the others were each fined $1,000.
- 1916 – Edward McCree of Georgia Legislature; owner of 37,000 acres of land; indicted on 13 charges. Pleaded guilty to first charge and paid a $1,000.00 fine.
- 1916 – two men found guilty in Lexington County, South Carolina, of trying to force a white man into peonage; each fined $500 and sentenced to a year and day in jail
- 1921 – Hawaiian sugar plantation owners unsuccessfully try to legalize peonage of Chinese workers.
- 1921 – Georgia Williams Plantation Murders: farmer John S. Williams and his black overseer Clyde Manning were convicted in the deaths of 11 blacks working as peons at Williams' farm. Williams was the only white farmer in Georgia convicted of murder for killing black peons since April 1, 1877.
- 1922 – Convicted in 1921 for hopping a freight train in Florida without a ticket, Martin Tabert of North Dakota becomes part of Florida State Convict leasing. He died Feb 1, 1922, after being whipped for being unable to work due to illness. Reports of his death led to the prohibition in 1923 of convict leasing in Florida. The man who killed Tabert, Thomas Walter Higginbotham, was later sentenced to 20 years in prison for second degree murder.
- 1923 – Investigations of the Tabert killing by the Florida state legislature in 1923 led to evidence of widespread abuses in north Florida and found that peonage was standard practice at the Knabb Turpentine camp in Baker County belonging to State Senator T. J. Knabb.
- 1925 – Pensacola, Florida - White farmer and four others found guilty of using negro workers in peonage
- 1925 – Columbia, South Carolina - An African-American youth who had been missing since 1923 escaped from peonage at a work camp.
- 1954 - Sumter County, Alabama - Two brothers Oscar and Fred Dial were convicted in May of holding two African-American men in peonage. In December they were sentenced to eighteen months in federal prison.

Because of the Spanish tradition, peonage remained legal and widespread in the New Mexico Territory even after the Civil War. In response, Congress passed the Peonage Act of 1867 on March 2, 1867, which said: "Sec 1990. The holding of any person to service or labor under the system known as peonage is abolished and forever prohibited in the territory of New Mexico, or in any other territory or state of the United States; and all acts, laws, … made to establish, maintain, or enforce, directly or indirectly, the voluntary or involuntary service or labor of any persons as peons, in liquidation of any debt or obligation, or otherwise, are declared null and void." The current version of this statute is codified at Chapter 21-I of 42 U.S.C. § 1994 and makes no specific mention of New Mexico.

== See also ==
- Serfdom
- Debt bondage
- Extortion
- Fagging
- Hodges v. United States, 203 U.S. 1 (1906)
- Bailey v. Alabama, 219 U.S. 219 (1911)
- Boy Slaves (1939 film)
- Mary Grace Quackenbos, federal attorney who investigated peonage in the United States in the early 1900s
- Mae Louise Miller - woman whom along with her family was enslaved in peonage until 1961
