= Convict leasing =

Penal labor system in the Southern United States

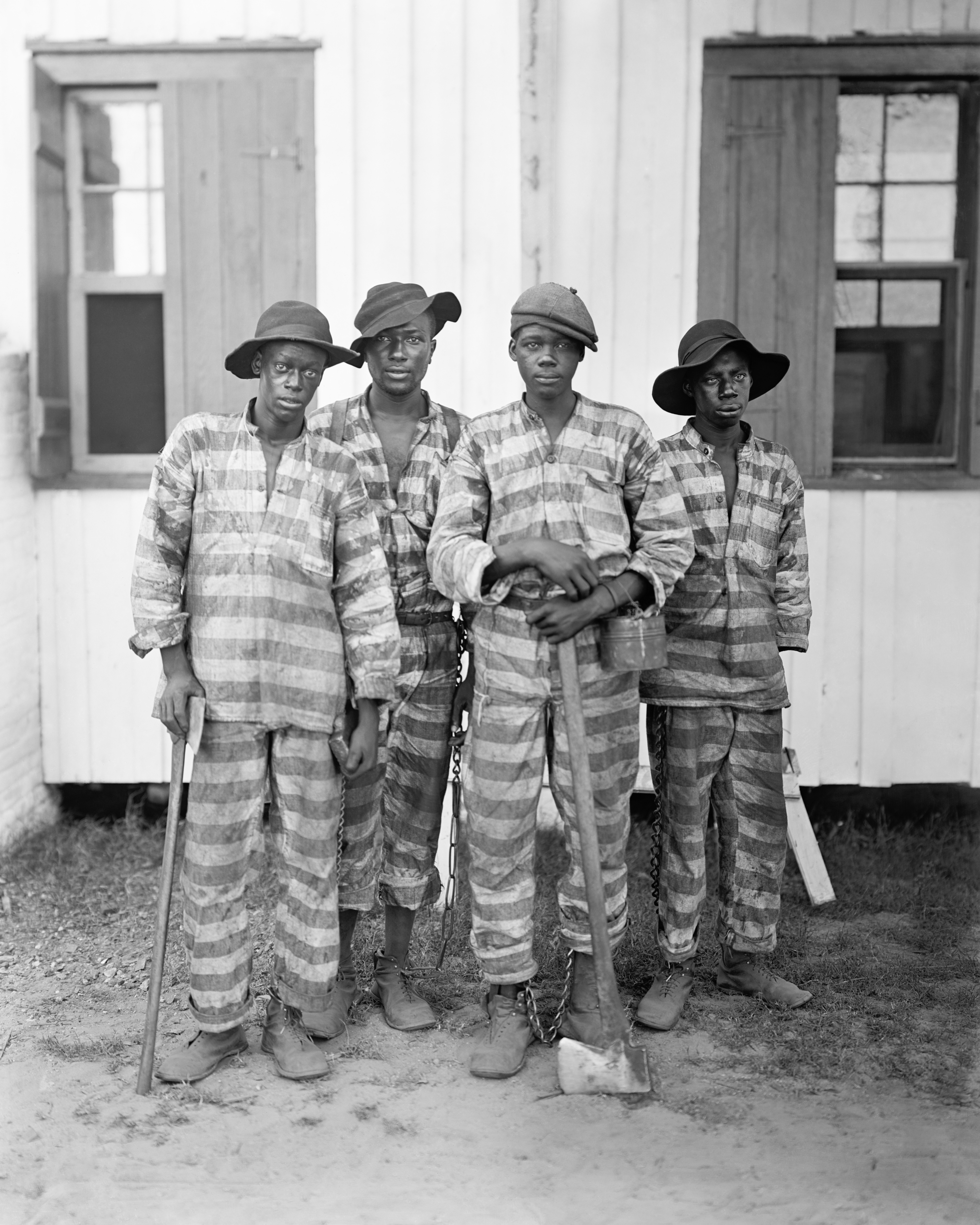
Convicted people leased to harvest timber c. 1903, in Florida

Convict leasing was a system of forced penal labor that was practiced in the Southern United States, where private individuals and corporations could lease labor from the state in the form of incarcerated people, nearly all of whom were Black.

The state of Louisiana leased out convicted people as early as 1844. The system expanded throughout most of the South with the emancipation of enslaved people at the end of the American Civil War in 1865. The practice peaked about 1880 and persisted in various forms until gradually phased out following Francis Biddle's "Circular No. 3591" of December 12, 1941. Whilst not having been explicitly abolished, the practice became politically untenable. As a result other forms of prison labour remain legal in the United States, under the Thirteenth Amendment's penal exemption clause.

The system was highly lucrative for both the lessees and state governments. For example, in 1898, 73 percent of Alabama's annual state revenue came from convict leasing, whilst contractors were able to lease people at costs as low as $9 a month. Corruption, lack of accountability, and violence resulted in "one of the harshest and most exploitative labor systems known in American history". African Americans, mostly adult males, due to "vigorous and selective enforcement of laws and discriminatory sentencing", comprised the vast majority, though not all, of the convicted people leased.

While states of the Northern United States sometimes contracted for prison labor, the historian Alex Lichtenstein notes that "only in the South did the state entirely give up its control to the contractor; and only in the South did the physical "penitentiary" become virtually synonymous with the various private enterprises in which incarcerated people labored".

The writer Douglas A. Blackmon described the system:

It was a form of bondage distinctly different from that of the antebellum South in that for most men, and the relatively few women drawn in, this slavery did not last a lifetime and did not automatically extend from one generation to the next. But it was nonetheless slavery – a system in which armies of free men, guilty of no crimes and entitled by law to freedom, were compelled to labor without compensation, were repeatedly bought and sold, and were forced to do the bidding of white masters through the regular application of extraordinary physical coercion.

== Origins ==
Convict leasing in the United States was widespread in the South during the Reconstruction Period (1865–1877) after the end of the Civil War, when many Southern legislatures were ruled by majority coalitions of African Americans and Radical Republicans, and Union generals acted as military governors. Farmers and businessmen needed to find replacements for the labor force once their slaves had been freed. After many African American politicians were forced out of state and local positions, many Southern legislatures passed Black Codes to restrict free movement of black people and force them into employment. For instance, several states made it illegal for a black man to change jobs without the approval of his employer. If convicted of vagrancy, black people could be imprisoned, and they also received sentences for a variety of petty offenses. States began to lease convicted labor to the plantations and other facilities seeking labor, as the freed men were trying to withdraw and work for themselves. This provided the states with a new source of revenue during years when their finances were largely depleted, and lessees profited by the use of forced labor at less than market rates.

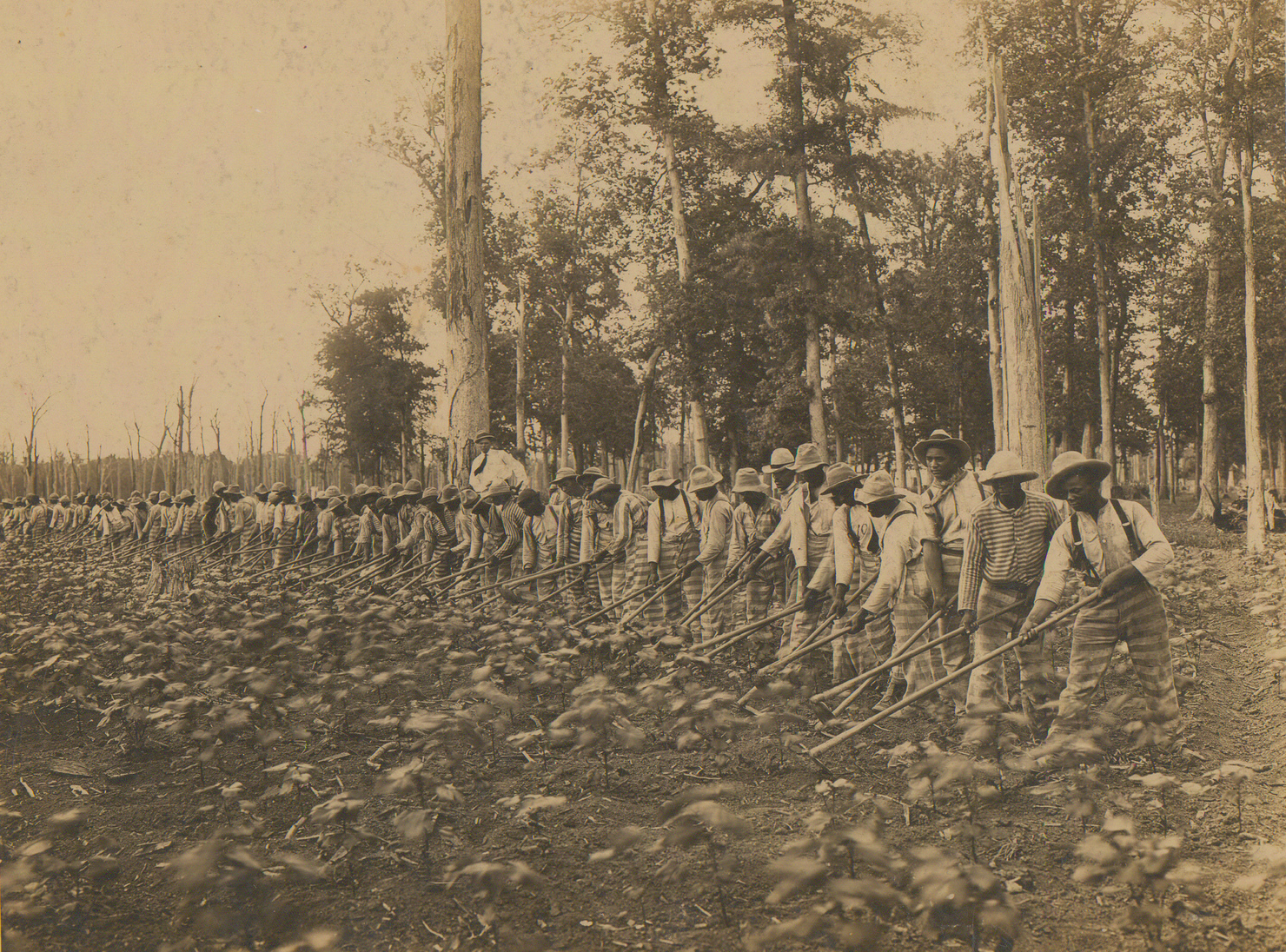
Incarcerated laborers at the Mississippi State Penitentiary at Parchman in 1911. When Mississippi ended convict leasing in 1906, all incarcerated people were sent to Parchman.

Black Codes, pig laws, and vagrancy laws, intended to restrict the movement and freedom of Black people across the South, functioned by criminalizing unemployment, homelessness, and changes in employment. These laws were coupled with increasing sentencing, and harsher penalties for minor offences across the South. In doing so, statutes created a new criminal class made up of newly freed people, rapidly expanding the numbers of people subject to imprisonment. As this happened, states across the South would begin to codify convict leasing within statute books. Alabama, as one example, did so in 1875 by amending several aspects of the Revised Code "to employ or hire out the convicts, to be used without the walls of the penitentiary, either upon public or private work, within the State". Whist prison labour had existed prior to the Civil War, the rapid expansion of incarcerated populations gave way for a reorganisation of carceral labour systems from internal state motivations to external economic and racial motivations.

The criminal justice system worked closely with private planters and industrialists to supply prison laborers, the overwhelming majority of whom were Black. The constitutional basis for convict leasing lay in the 1865 Thirteenth Amendment, which ostensibly abolished slavery and involuntary servitude "except as a punishment for crime". In several states, such as Alabama, the practice would be implemented following fiscal crises, with the purpose of the practice to provide financial profits to the lessees, and to the government agencies that sold convicted labor to the lessees. The practice became widespread and was used to supply labor to farming, railroad, mining and logging operations throughout the South.

Although convict leasing became most widespread throughout the post-Civil War South, similar systems of contract prison labour had existed earlier in Northern states as well. For example, the New York State prison at Auburn, Auburn Prison, implemented a system of silent prison labor which resulted in profits generated for the prison as early as 1823. Although prison manufacturing had initially focused on manufacturing goods intended for use within the prison, such as uniforms and buckets, that practice changed in 1821 when principal keeper, Elam Lynds, took over prison administration, and used incarcerated laborers to produce goods to sell on the market. Lynds' approach, known as the Auburn system, or "silent system", expanded across the United States becoming the dominant model of prison discipline by the 1830s. Initially conceived as a "regime of moral discipline", rather than explicitly driven by a profit motive, the costs of implementing the system were offset by the profits generated by prison-made goods. In the south and west of the United States carceral labour systems would disproportionately rely upon Black incarcerated people.

== Economic motivations ==
Following emancipation and the Civil War, Southern states were economically devastated with many state treasuries facing fiscal crises and insolvency. Additionally, with the loss of enslaved labourers, private enterprise would also struggle to sustain Southern economies without a rapid evolution. This economic motivation to keep economies built on forced labour afloat, led states and businesses to turn toward incarceration, and incarcerated people, to support both government spending and private sector profits. With the sudden growth of incarceration as a labour source, corruption would follow with companies lagging behind on payments, states aiming to maximise revenues, and both losing track of exactly who was incarcerated.

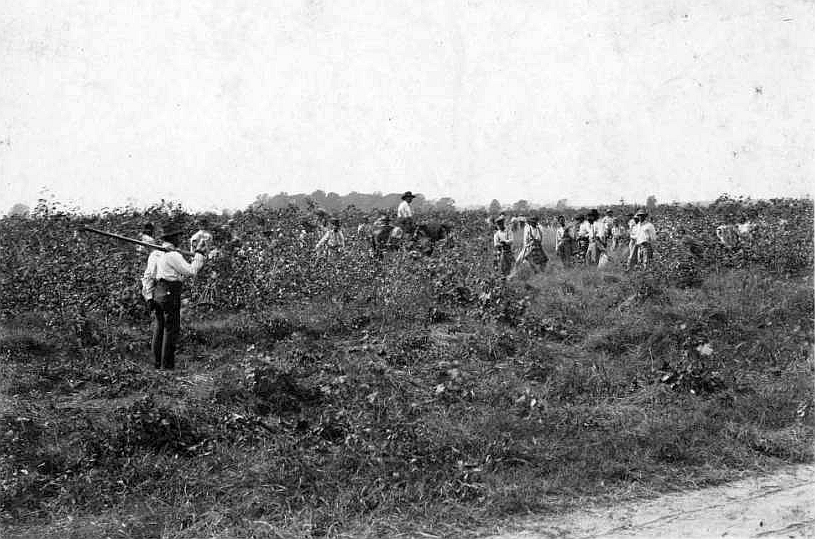
Incarcerated people picking cotton at Angola State Farm, c. 1900

Incarcerated, overwhelmingly Black, people were a source of revenue for states from the onset of convict leasing, viewed as a cheap and disposable workforce, and this view would persist as prison labour transitioned away from convict leasing and toward prisons as state operated self-sustaining plantations, farms and factories, like Angola Plantation which operates to this day. The state would, in effect, become the lessee.

The economic rationale of convict leasing was inseparable from its racial motivations and roots. Following slavery, incarceration and carceral labour were utilised to rebuild economies with the newly criminalised Black citizens. Contemporary sociologist Frank Tannenbaum observed that incarceration was not solely an economic alternative to slavery, but a reorganisation to preserve racial hierarchy and provide a flow of cheap labour for industry.

== Lived experiences and gender ==
By the 1880s, Black people made up between 80 and 90% of those incarcerated in the South. The lived experience of two Black men—Ezekiel Archey and Ambrose Haskins—who were leased to the Pratt Mines by the state, was documented in their petition to Reginald Dawson, the then president of the Alabama Board of Inspectors of Convicts. Their letter describes persistent discrimination and physical abuse based explicitly on their skin colour, as well as a refusal to allow them family visitation. They also describe food shortages, and excessive work quotas. They observed that Black people "who do the work" were being routinely punished for the misconduct of incarcerated white people, whilst also denied the same privileges afforded to the white people. At no point do they plea for freedom, but they write to show the harsh treatment of incarcerated Black people as compared to incarcerated white people, as delays and missed quotas were out of their control.

Whilst the majority of people subjected to convict leasing were Black men, Black women were also incarcerated and forced into labour within the system. Women’s experiences were both gendered and racialised, reflecting an intersection of punishment, exploitation, and social control. In the post-Emancipation South, Black women were also criminalised through the same mechanisms that men were with charges of vagrancy, petty theft, and "crimes against morality." These charges often masked efforts to regulate behaviour, enforce economic dependence, and maintain social control over Black women.

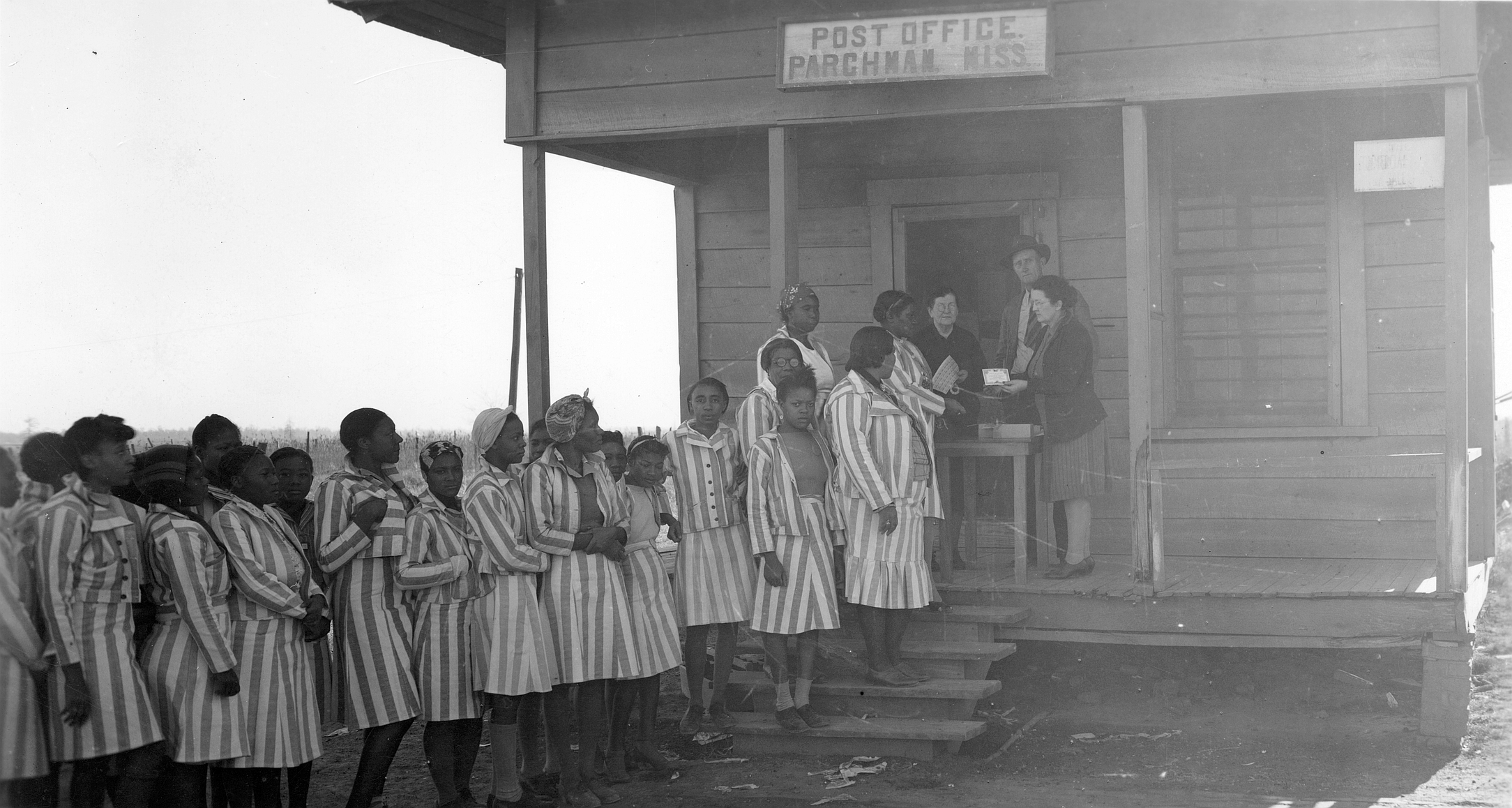
Women prisoners wait in line at the Parchman Post Office, circa 1930 (Mississippi Department of Archives and History)

One example of the intersection of race and gender with convict leasing is the life of Ella Gamble who, whilst pregnant, was incarcerated for murder in 1884 by an all white male jury, based on circumstantial evidence. Whilst incarcerated she spent two decades leased out to many private companies, performing a range of industrial, agricultural, and domestic labor tasks ranging from brick-making to cooking, "under the sting of the lash." Toward the end of her incarceration she had physically deteriorated under the cumulative strain of forced work, repeated floggings, sexual abuse, childbirth injuries, and untreated medical conditions.

Another example is that of Carrie Massie, a teenaged incarcerated victim of extreme physical and sexual violence in Georgia. Leased to the Rising Fawn furnace, upon arrival she was subject to cruel and unusual punishments known as "water cure" and "blind mule", before sexual violence and repeated rape at the hands of the whipping boss. Though camp operator Joseph Brown had built the female barracks separately from the male barracks ostensibly to prevent sexual assaults, women were routinely victimised by guards. Black women were not only perceived as promiscuous and "unrapeable", but their labour was considered the "property" of camp officials. Officials acted as though they "owned" sexual access to incarcerated Black women. Sexual abuse and harsh punishments acted as functions of prison hierarchy, exploited to maintain control over Black women.

== The system in various states ==
Convict leasing in Southern States began in 1844, when Louisiana's first state prison, The Walls, was not turning a profit. Louisiana leased prisoners to private individuals and corporations, mainly plantations, until 1901, when the state took back control of the prison. In Georgia convict leasing began in April 1868, when Union General and newly appointed provisional governor Thomas H. Ruger issued a convict lease for incarcerated people to William Fort for work on the Georgia and Alabama Railroad. The contract specified "one hundred able bodied and healthy Negro convicts" in return for a fee to the state of $2,500. In May, the state entered into a second agreement with Fort and his business partner Joseph Printup for another 100 convicted people, this time for $1,000, to work on the Selma, Rome and Dalton Railroad, also in north Georgia. Georgia ended the convict lease system in 1908.

In Tennessee, the convict leasing system was ended on January 1, 1894, because of the attention brought by the "Coal Creek War" of 1891, an armed labor action lasting more than a year. At the time, both free and convict labor were used in mines, although the two types of workers were kept separated. Free coal miners attacked and burned prison stockades, and freed hundreds of convicted black people; the related publicity and outrage turned Governor John P. Buchanan out of office.

The end of convict leasing did not mean the end of convict labor, however. The state sited its new penitentiary, Brushy Mountain State Penitentiary, with the help of geologists. The prison built a working coal mine on the site, dependent on labor done by incarcerated people, and operated it at significant profit. These prison mines were closed in 1966.

Texas began convict leasing by 1883 and abolished it officially in 1910. A cemetery containing what are believed to be the remains of 95 slave convicts was discovered in 2018 in Sugar Land, now a suburb of Houston.

The Convict Lease System and Lynch Law are twin infamies which flourish hand in hand in many of the United States. They are the two great outgrowths and results of the class legislation under which our people suffer to-day.

— Ida B. Wells

Alabama began convict leasing in 1846 and outlawed it in 1928. It was the last state to formally outlaw it. The revenues derived from convict leasing were substantial, accounting for about 10% of total state revenues during 1883, surging to nearly 73% by 1898. Political campaigning against convict leasing in Alabama began in 1915. Bibb Graves, who became Alabama's governor in 1927, had promised during his election campaign to abolish convict leasing as soon as he was inaugurated, and this was finally achieved by the end of June 1928.

This lucrative practice created incentives for states and counties to convict African Americans, and helped increase the prison population in the South to become predominantly African American after the Civil War. In Tennessee, African Americans represented 33 percent of the population at the main prison in Nashville as of October 1, 1865, but, by November 29, 1867, their percentage had increased to 58.3. By 1869, it had increased to 64 percent, and it reached an all-time high of 67 percent between 1877 and 1879.

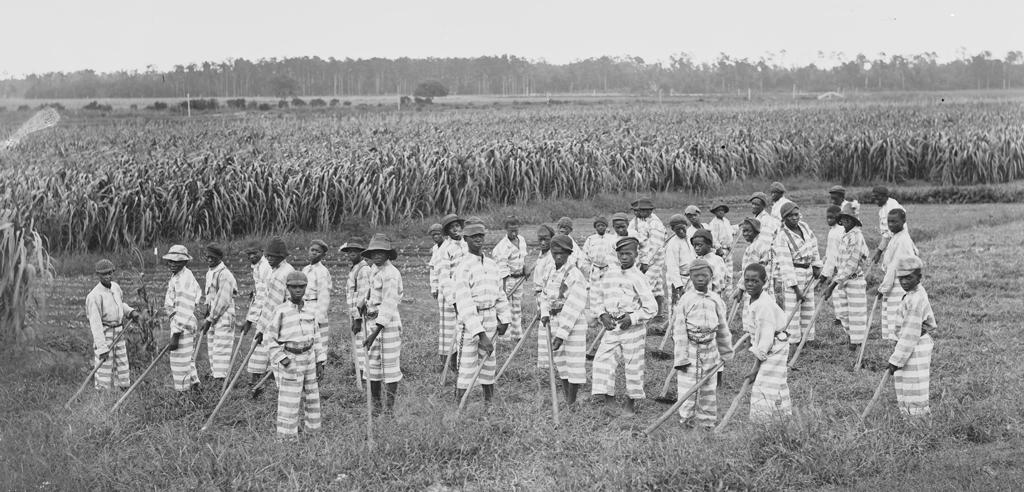
Orphaned and "Criminal" Children. 1903.

Prison populations also increased overall in the South. In Georgia, prison populations increased tenfold during the four-decade period (1868–1908) when it used convict leasing; in North Carolina, the prison population increased from 121 in 1870 to 1,302 in 1890; in Florida, the population increased from 125 in 1881 to 1,071 in 1904; in Mississippi, the population quadrupled between 1871 and 1879; in Alabama, it increased from 374 in 1869 to 1,878 in 1903 and then to 2,453 in 1919.

In Florida, convicts, most of whom were African American males, were sent to work in phosphate mines, turpentine camps, and lumber camps, although from 1910 onward all Florida state incarcerated people labored in turpentine and lumber camps. The convict labor system in Florida was described as being "severe" in comparison to that in other states. Florida was one of the last states to end convict leasing. The state convict leasing program was ended by Chapter 7833 of the Legislature effective December 31, 1919. County convicted people continued to be leased to private interests until 1923. Following the abolition of convict leasing in 1919, the number and proportion of white males sentenced to state prison increased quickly; many incarcerated people labored in public road construction while others were sent to Union Correctional Institution, then known as Raiford Prison.

== End of the system ==
Although opposition to the system increased during the beginning of the twentieth century, state politicians resisted its elimination. In states where the convict lease system was used, revenues from the program generated income nearly four times the cost (372%) of prison administration. The practice was extremely profitable for the governments, as well as for those business owners who used convict labor. However, other problems accompanied convict leasing, and employers became gradually more aware of the disadvantages.

The convict lease system was gradually phased out during the early 20th century due to negative publicity and other factors. A notable case of negative publicity for the system was the case of Martin Tabert, a young white man from Munich, North Dakota. Arrested in late 1921 in Tallahassee, Florida on a charge of vagrancy for being on a train without a ticket, Tabert was convicted and fined $25. Although his parents sent $25 for the fine, plus $25 for Tabert to return home to North Dakota, the money disappeared while Tabert was held in the Leon County Jail. Tabert was then leased to the Putnam Lumber Company in Clara, a town in the Florida Panhandle approximately 60 miles (97 km) south of Tallahassee in Dixie County. There, he was flogged to death by the whipping boss, Thomas Walter Higginbotham. Coverage of Tabert's killing by the New York World newspaper in 1924 earned it the Pulitzer Prize for Public Service. Governor Cary A. Hardee ended convict leasing in 1923, due in part to the Tabert case and the resulting publicity.

North Carolina, while without a system comparable to the other states, did not prohibit the practice until 1933. Alabama was the last to end the practice of official convict leasing in 1928 by the State, but many counties in the South continued the practice for years.

== Continuity and erasure ==
While some believe the demise of the system can be attributed to exposure of the inhumane treatment suffered by the convicts, others indicate causes ranging from comprehensive legislative reforms to political retribution. Though the convict lease system, as such, disappeared, other types of convict labor continued (and still exist presently). These other systems include plantations, industrial prisons and chain gangs. As of 2024, many prisoners in Alabama work 40 hours a week outside their facilities while denied parole.

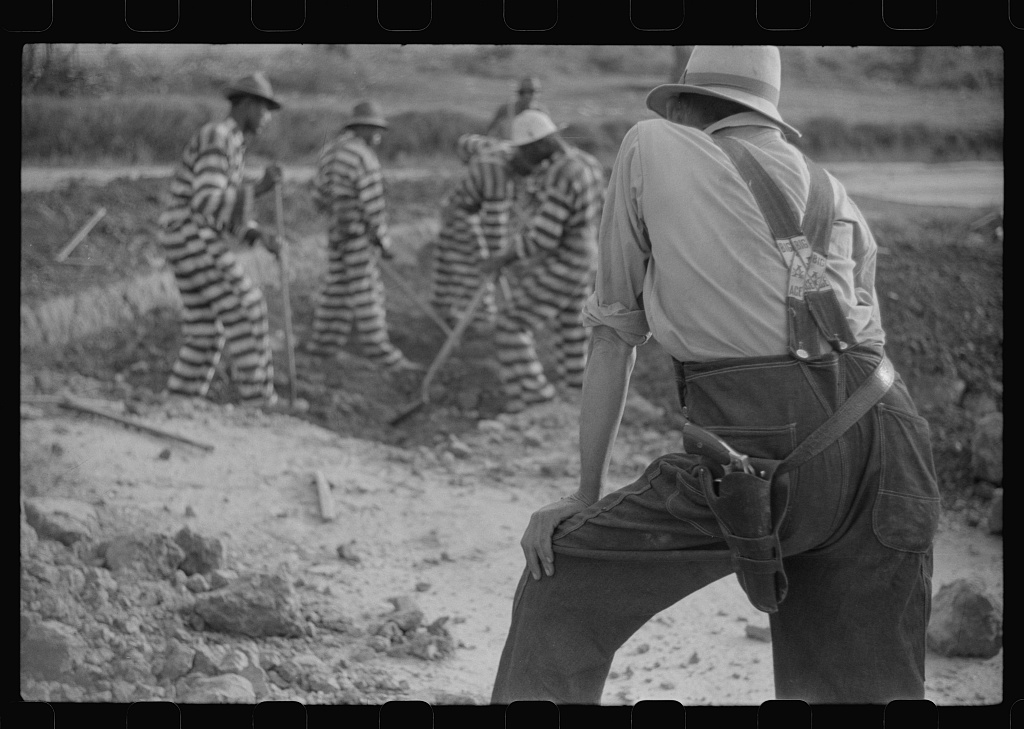
Convict laborers in striped uniforms working under armed guard in Oglethorpe County, Georgia. Photograph by Jack Delano for the Farm Security Administration.

The attitudes and hierarchies of both slavery and convict leasing can be seen within the modern day carceral setting. They are rationalised by people that work within, and maintain control of, prisons. This was evidenced in 2024 as part of an anthropological study wherein an ethnographic methodology of "intentional forgetting" was employed to prompt corrections officers to explain and rationalise their practices, documenting how they sustain institutional control over incarcerated people. The practice of intentional forgetting was developed and inspired by the observed tendency of correctional officers to forget or downplay their own participation in carceral violence.

The Lone Rock Stockade Project approached the same phenomenon from the opposite direction, by excavating what has been buried. In doing so they assess the documented "dark heritage" of abuse, and re-established a narrative that had been "largely forgotten by American society". The project set out to, through community archaeology and public engagement, show that local prosperity was built on racialised carceral labour, as well as how the legal framework that had enabled it continues to shape prison labour today.

== See also ==
- Convict assignment (Australia)
- Debt bondage
- Federal Prison Industries
- Field holler
- Field slaves in the United States
- History of unfree labor in the United States
- Penal labor exception
- Penal labor in the United States
- Peonage
- Ruiz v. Estelle
- Slavery in the 21st century#Prison labor
- Trusty system
