= Indian slave trade between Barbados and South Carolina =

17th-18th century slave trade of Native Americans

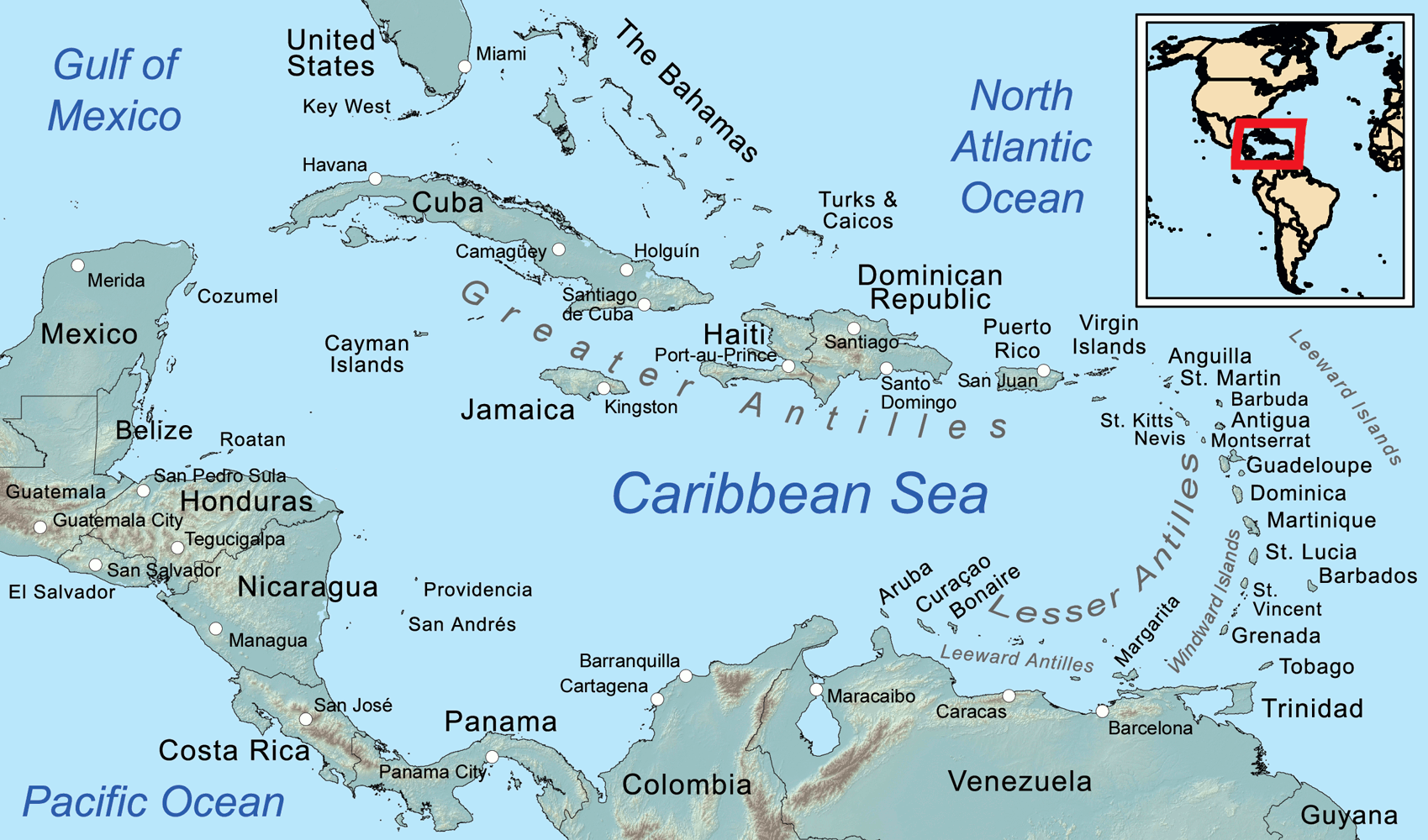
The Caribbean Sea. Barbados (lower right) was attractive to European settlers because of its lack of an indigeous population and its gentle terrain, suitable for sugar plantations.

The Indian slave trade between Barbados and South Carolina flourished from 1670 to 1717. Tens of thousands of Native Americans (Indians) living in what would become the United States were captured by white and Indian slavers and transported by ship to Barbados and other Caribbean islands to work on sugar plantations. The Indian slave trade was a major economic activity in the early years of the British colony of South Carolina. Greatly outnumbered by African slaves imported into Barbados, the Indian slaves on Barbados were absorbed into the general population and by the mid-18th century nearly all signs of their presence had been erased or forgotten.

Despite an area of only 166 sq mi (430 km^{2}), Barbados in the late 17th century and early 18th century was the richest British colony in the Americas and the most crowded with people due to the labor-intensive characteristics of the sugar plantations.

== Colonization of Barbados ==
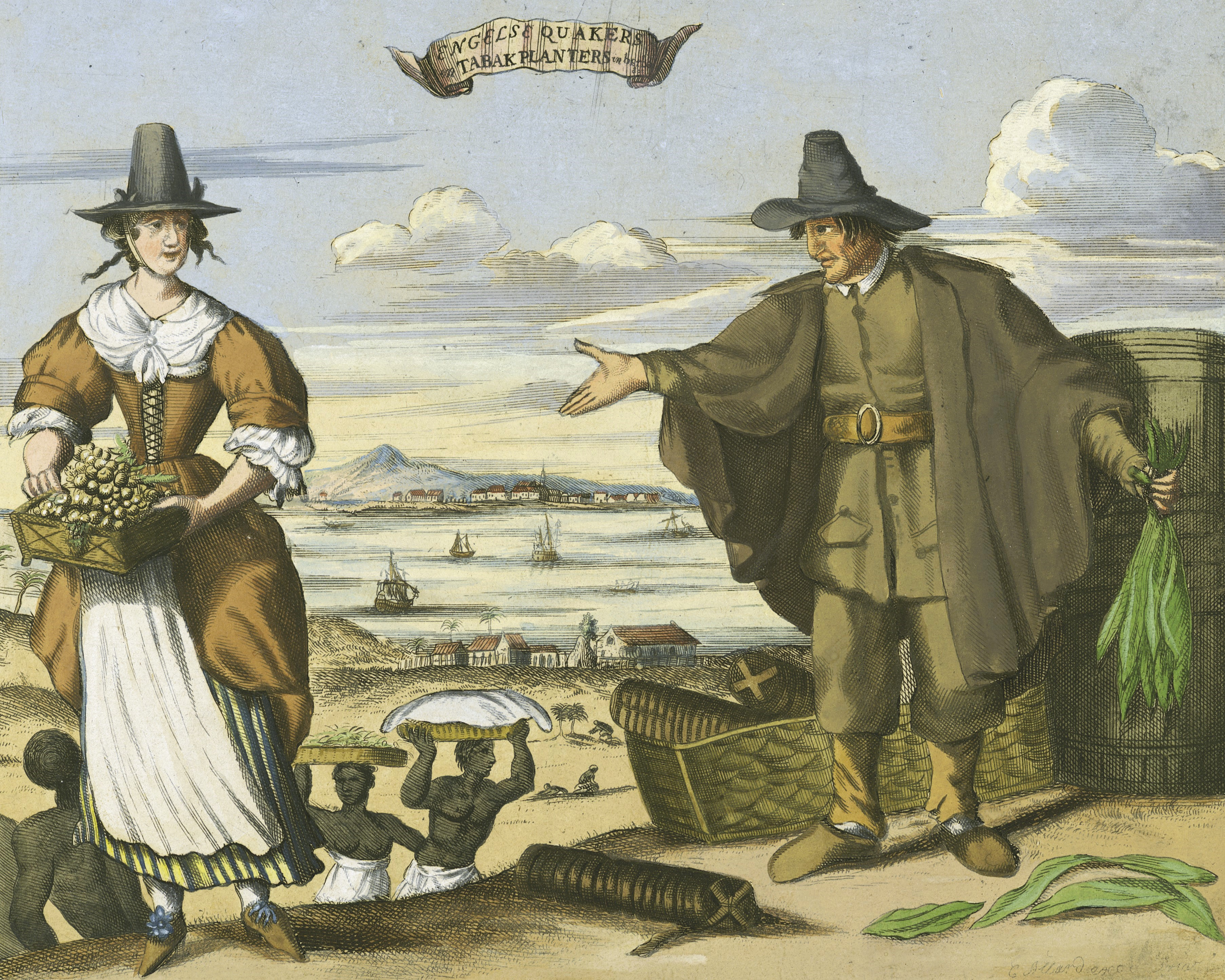
English Quakers were among the slave-owning colonists on Barbados in the 17th century.

In the early 1620s, the indigenous Arawak population of Barbados had been nearly exterminated by Spanish slave raids and raids by Caribs. Barbados was an attractive place for colonization as the absence of an indigenous population meant the usual hostile or difficult relations with the local people was not a factor. The first British settlement in Barbados was founded by Henry Powell in 1627. Powell brought with him to the island about 80 people, including ten African slaves. He imported 32 Indigenous people (Indians) from the Dutch colony of Guiana to teach the colonists how to grow cotton, tobacco, and indigo. The Guianan Indians were forced into slavery about 1630 by the colonists. In 1636, the governor of Barbados, Henry Hawley, decreed that "Indians and Negros that came here to be sold should serve for life" thus eliminating the possibility of emancipation for imported slaves. Many of the early settlers in Barbados were British indentured servants. Living conditions for both slaves and indentured servants were difficult. The first Indian slaves imported into Barbados from what became the United States may have been Pequots from New England after the Pequot War (1636–1638). Also, in the aftermath of King Phillip's War (1675–1678) in New England, several hundred Indians were forced into slavery and deported, some to the Caribbean. Many of the Indian slaves in those early years were captured on the nearby South American mainland known as Guiana.

The number of African slaves in Barbados increased rapidly after the 1640s when sugar plantations began to dominate the agriculture on the island. Indian slaves became few in number compared to the slaves imported from Africa. In the 1670s, the population of Barbados was estimated to be 21,725 whites and 32,473 Africans. A 1684 estimate was that only 72 Indian slaves were resident on the island, surely an undercount although by that time much of the earlier Indian slave population had probably been absorbed into the African and white populations.

Mortality of slaves on Barbados was high with more deaths than births. A constant re-supply of slaves was necessary to maintain an adequate work force for the sugar plantations.

== South Carolina connection ==
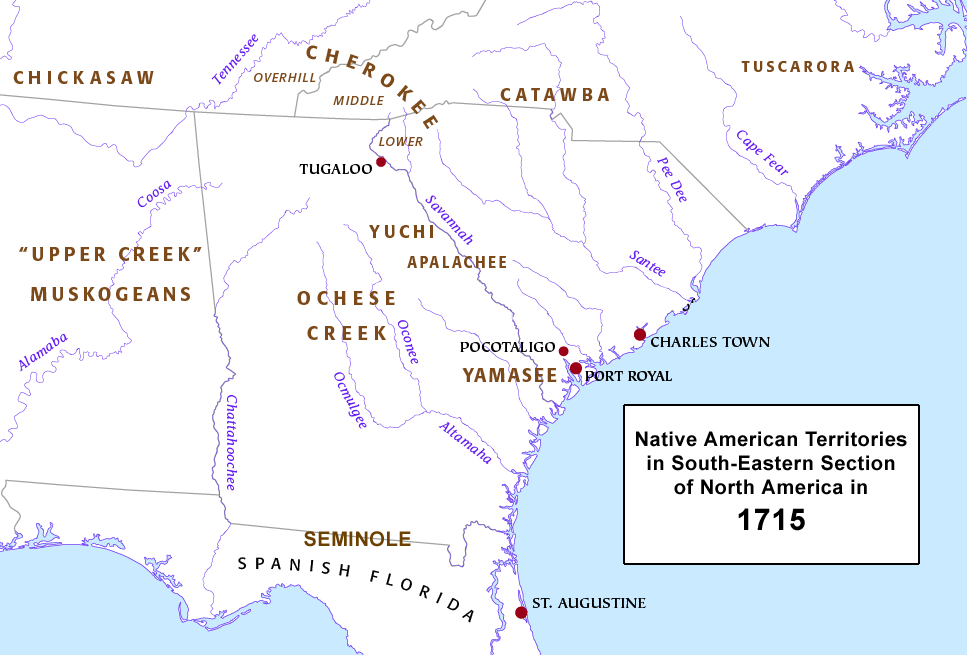
The southeastern United States in 1715. Charles Town (Charleston) was the center for the import and export of slaves.

The creation of a British colony in South Carolina was partly due to Barbadian interests. Most of the small island of Barbados (166 sq mi (430 km^{2}) was covered by sugar plantations with little land left over for production of food and other crops. In 1663, the Barbadian Adventurers was founded by men who planned to settle in what became the Carolinas. Their intention was to create in South Carolina what author D. Andrew Johnson called an "agro-slaving regime", a colony resembling what they left behind in Barbados: a plantation system characterized by white owners and African and Indian slaves. In 1670 the city of Charleston was founded.

The struggling new colony produced several export products: food and wood for Barbados and other Caribbean islands, deerskins for the United Kingdom, and enslaved Indians. In 1674, the colony concluded a peace agreement with the Westo, a recently arrived remnant of the Erie people who had been defeated and expelled from their Lake Erie homeland by the Iroquois in 1656. Newcomers, as were the British colonists, the Westo became the suppliers to the British of slaves captured from other Indian tribes. The primary source of slaves were from the Guale and Mocama people from the coasts of what became the states of Georgia and Florida, then part of the Spanish colony of Florida. The Westos also preyed on the Indian peoples allied with the colonists which proved their undoing. In 1680, a coalition of local Indian tribes, the newly arrived "Savannah" Indians, a part of the Shawnee, and the colonists defeated the Westo and sold the survivors into slavery, probably transporting most of them to the Caribbean. The Shawnee then became the primary purveyors of Indian captives to the colonists. The Chickasaw who lived 500 miles (800 km) west of Charleston in northern Mississippi were important slavers.

The defeat of the Westo led to an expansion of the Indian slave trade in South Carolina with raiders ranging from the Spanish colony of Florida to hundreds of miles west to the Mississippi River and beyond. Author Alan Galley says that Charleston was "an Ellis Island for Africans" arriving in the U.S. and the opposite, a point of departure, for enslaved Indians. He estimated that that between 1670 and 1715, 24,000 to 51,000 captive Indians were exported from South Carolina, more than the number of African slaves imported into South Carolina during that same period. Barbados was one of the main destinations for the Indian slaves. The semi-clandestine nature of the trade make estimates of its size difficult.

As an example of the trade items exported from South Carolina to Barbados, Galley cites a 1682 ship which carried to Barbados cedar wood, three hunded bushels (7,600 kg) of maize, thirty barrels of tar, ten barrels of pork, and thirteen Indian slaves. For slave buyers on islands in the Caribbean, slaves from South Carolina were cheaper than slaves from Africa due to lower transport costs and the absence of a British tax on slaves imported from Africa. As Indian slaves were untaxed, their presence on outward bound ships from Charleston to Barbados were undocumented. Another advantage of transporting Indian slaves from South Carolina to Barbados rather than retaining them in South Carolina was that they had less opportunity to escape in Barbados.

The impact on Indian peoples in the southeastern United States as a result of slaving were substantial. The demand by Indians for European products such as guns, cotton cloth, steel knives, and iron cooking pots initiated their integration into the European world. They became dependent on the Europeans for items that became essential to their culture and even their survival. For example, tribes with guns had a military advantage over tribes without guns and thus the acquisition of guns became a necessity. Slaves and deer skins were the two most important products that Indians had for trade with the British in South Carolina. Slaving also contributed to a decline in the Indian population in the "South" (not defined as to precise area) which has been estimated at 199,000 in 1685, but only 90,000 in 1715. The decline in Indian populations was partially due to slavery, but also a consequence of the Smallpox epidemic of 1696 which decimated many Indian peoples who lacked immunity to this disease of European origin. The spread of smallpox was facilitated by the widespread travels of white and Indian slavers and their slaves.

While most Indians captured by slavers were exported to the Caribbean, in 1715 South Carolinians owned an estimated 1,850 Indian slaves.

The Indian slave trade by the British in the southeastern United States largely ended with the Yamassee War (1715–1717). The Yamasee were an amalgamation of the remnants of earlier tribes and chiefdoms. They inflicted heavy casualties on the Carolina colony and killed many of the slave traders. One of the reasons for the war was the slave trade which had impacted the Yamassee although they had been allies of the whites in South Carolina and slave traders themselves. The Yamassee War effectively ended most of the trade in Indian slaves in South Carolina. The colonists reoriented their economy away from Indian slavery toward the export of deerskins and rice agriculture using imported African slaves for labor.

== Later years ==
In 1724, there were 18,000 free whites and 55,000 enslaved Africans living on Barbados. The Indian slaves were mostly invisible among the much more numerous African and white populations. The last major shipment of Indian slaves to Haiti in the Caribbean was perhaps the shipment of 480 Natchez to the Caribbean after the Natchez revolt against the French in Mississippi in 1729. In 1747, the governor of Barbados said there were no more Indian slaves on the island. Few traces survive of the thousands of Indian slaves who were taken to Barbados from South Carolina.

== Historiography ==
The number of Indian slaves imported into Barbados has been underestimated by historians due to their invisibility in the official records. For example, scholar Jerome S. Handler in 1969 said that few Indian slaves were imported into Barbados after 1675. Twenty-first century historians have corrected that view. Handler was unaware of the Indian slave trade between Barbados and Carolina. Secrecy about the trade was due to several efforts in the late 17th century by the British governments in Barbados and South Carolina to ban the trade in Indian slaves. Government's efforts notwithstanding, the Indian slave trade to the Caribbean islands seems to have peaked during the disruption caused by Queen Anne's War (1702–1713) when the cost of African slaves more than doubled. South Carolinians found it profitable to transport both Indian and their previously imported African slaves from Charleston to the Caribbean.

Some historians have asserted that African slaves were more valuable than Indian slaves due to the Africans alleged tractability and capacity for hard labor. African slaves in fact, fetched higher prices in South Carolina, but the price paid for slaves probably took into account that Indians were more likely to escape due to their familiarity with the environment. Indians were also more likely to die as they were susceptible to Old World diseases such as smallpox introduced into the Americas by the Europeans. The Indian and African slave population also had different characteristics. Most newly-arrived African slaves were adult males and most Indian slaves were women and children. Men were valued higher because of their ability to undertake the physical labor of the plantations. Historian Gallay in a like-to-like comparison of the price of African and Indian adult male slaves in the Caribbean, where neither had much possibility of escaping and the lifetime of all slaves was short, did not see significant differences in their market value. African slavery came to dominate in both South Carolina and Barbados because there were not enough Indians to fulfill the demand for plantation labor.
