= Pongueaje =

Pongueaje or pongaje was an informal system of forced and compulsory labor in indigenous communities in Peru and Bolivia, in which male community members were required to work on landowners' estates in exchange for a plot of land. It can also refer to unpaid domestic service for landowners, or more broadly to mandatory servitude on a rotating basis. In 1945 the Congreso Indígena de Bolivia declared the abolition of pongaje.

== See also ==
- Inquilinaje
