= Knabb Turpentine =

Historic business in northeast Florida

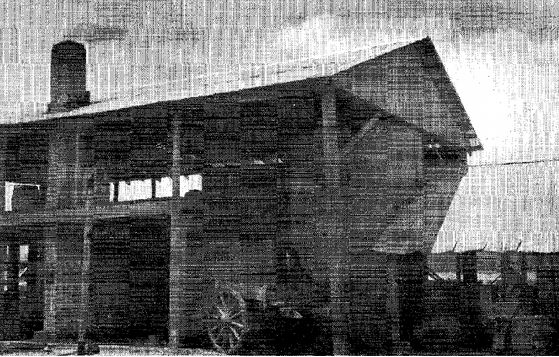
Knabb Fire Still

Knabb Turpentine was the name used for the pine resin harvesting and turpentine distilling businesses operated in northeast Florida, United States, by the Knabb brothers: Thomas Jefferson, William, and Earl, of Macclenny. Turpentine production boomed in North Florida between the late 1800s and 1920s; in the early 1900s, the Knabb family began to build one of the largest turpentine operations in the United States, and by the mid-20th century owned over 200,000 acres of pine forest in Baker County, over half its area. The eldest brother, T.J. Knabb (1880–1937), was the founder and president of the original Knabb Turpentine company. He made a fortune with the forced labor of jail inmates he leased from Baker, Alachua and Bradford counties, holding the convicts in peonage. Knabb was elected to the Florida Legislature in 1921 and served as a state senator of District 29 during the 1921, 1923, 1929 and 1931 legislative sessions. He was a co-founder of the Citizen's Bank of Macclenny and its vice-president until his death.

A new Knabb Turpentine corporate identity, Knabb Turpentine Company, was incorporated by William Knabb on 4 October 1932 in Macclenny. In 1948, an industry journal cited the Knabb Turpentine Company as having "one of the largest fire stills in existence today."

After national newspapers exposed the inhumane conditions at T. J. Knabb's turpentine camp in the early 1920s, Knabb Turpentine was investigated by the Florida state legislature concerning several questionable deaths there. In 1936, in response to numerous complaints of involuntary servitude and peonage, the Justice Department investigated Knabb Turpentine employment practices. William and Earl Knabb were charged with violations of peonage laws, but were acquitted by a jury.

== History ==
=== Peonage in North Florida turpentine camps ===
In the winter of 1922, Martin Tabert, a 22-year-old farm boy from a prominent North Dakota family, was beaten to death by Thomas Walter Higginbotham, the chief whipping boss at a turpentine camp in Dixie County owned by the Putnam Lumber Company.

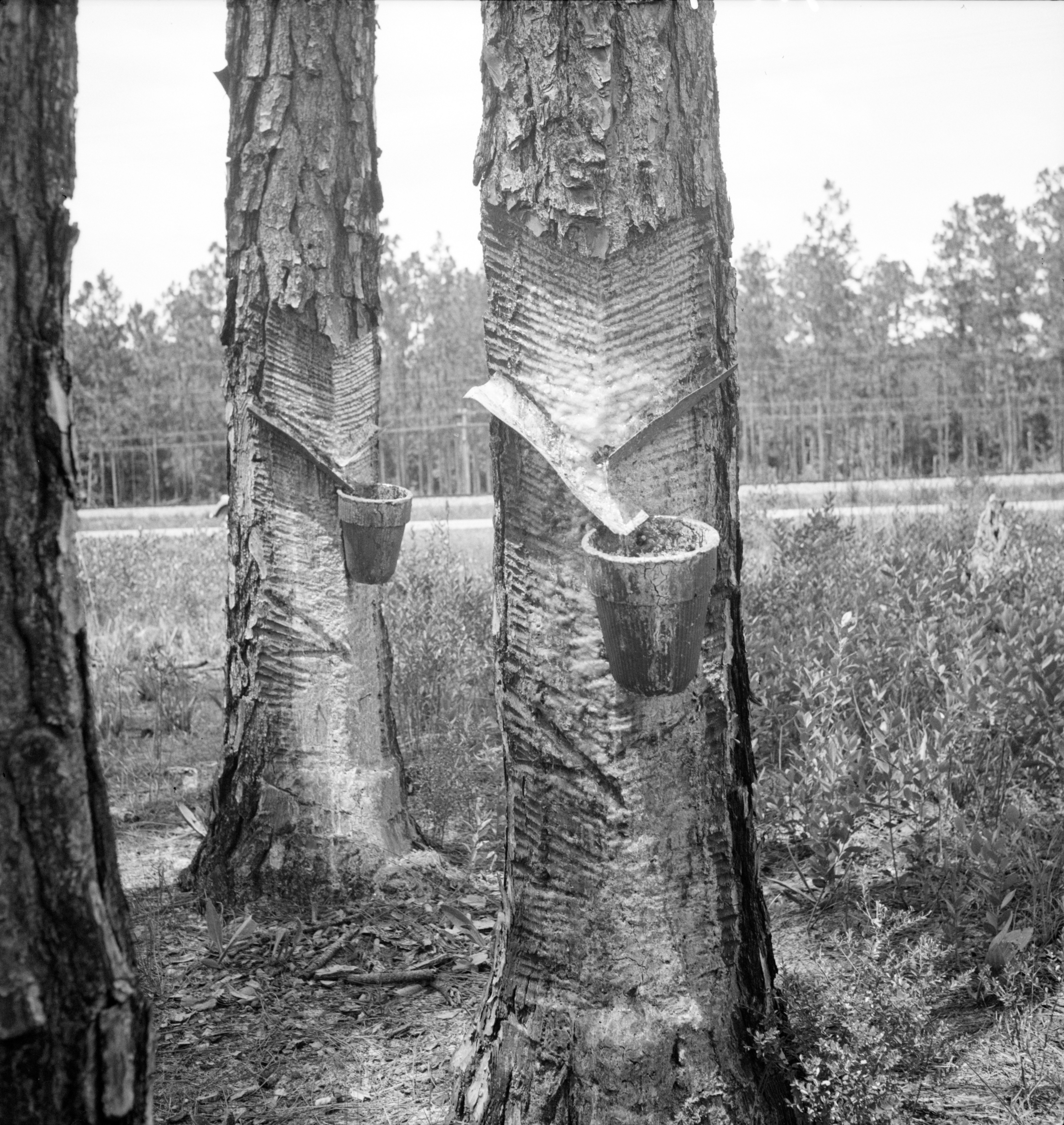
Cup and gutter system of harvesting turpentine from yellow pines

Suffering from malaria, and unable to work as hard as the labor demanded, Tabert, according to the sworn testimony of several witnesses, received a flogging of nearly 100 lashes with a 5-foot-long leather strap by Higginbotham; Tabert died three days later on February 1, 1922. Because the victim was white rather than black, Tabert's death drew national media attention; previous cases involving black victims had received little notice.

Florida Governor Cary Hardee at first dismissed the incident as an isolated case, but investigations of the Tabert killing by the Florida state legislature in 1923 led to evidence of widespread abuses in north Florida and found that peonage was standard practice at the Baker County turpentine camps belonging to State Senator T. J. Knabb.

The investigating committee found substantial evidence of abusive treatment of convicts in Knabb's turpentine camps in Baker and Bradford counties. The state legislature's investigation was expanded when information surfaced about the abuse suffered by Paul Revere White and of other inmates at Knabb's camps. White, a nineteen-year-old man from Washington, D. C., had been arrested while walking beside a highway near White Springs, Florida. He was arrested and convicted of vagrancy, for which he was sentenced to serve six months in the Alachua County jail. He was leased to Senator Knabb and put to work scraping turpentine boxes in Baker County. White testified that he was "kicked, beaten, and whipped practically every day" at Knabb's camp because he was not as productive as the African American workers. His testimony was corroborated by the physician who treated White, R. L. Lamb of Macclenny, who testified that the "youth's hands and feet were minus skin to the flesh, deep seated ulcers were found on his legs, and one or more ribs were fractured where . . . the whipping boss hit him with his fist, and where he had also kicked him."

=== State legislature investigative committee gathers evidence ===
Prison inspector J. B. Thomas reported to Commissioner of Agriculture W. A. McRae that White was forced to sleep on a cot with no covering when the air temperature was 18 °F (−8 °C), and that he had personally removed him because "it meant murder to leave the man at the camp."

Thomas had described the Knabb turpentine camp as a "human slaughter pen" in his report, but later retracted this statement after a meeting with Senator Knabb. Thomas did, however, alert the Florida commissioner of agriculture of White's treatment, and his statement triggered a thorough investigation of conditions at Knabb's camps. The camp "captain", John Roddenbury, was indicted for cruel and inhumane treatment by a Baker County grand jury, but Knabb was not charged."

On May 9, 1923, Thelma Franklin, a social worker, former school teacher, and wife of the Glen St. Mary postmaster, testified before the joint committee investigating reports of brutalities inflicted on convicts in Florida. She gave her testimony while sitting directly across from Senator Knabb in the court room, and described what she had observed as a neighbor of Knabb's turpentine camp. She told the committee how a man called "Warden Thompson", employed by Senator Knabb, had shot and killed Mary Sheffield, an African American woman, and her daughter at one of the convict camps. Sheffield, who cut Thompson before she was slain, was to have appeared before the committee as a material witness.

As subsequent testimony before the committee revealed, residents of the area near the convict camps were aware of their bad conditions and of abuses by the overseers, but some officials involved in local politics were able to avoid their exposure and suppress local outrage. Thelma Franklin, however, vocally condemned White's treatment and asserted that the deaths of another nine inmates at the camp should be investigated. Florida's four prison inspectors periodically visited work camps and interviewed prisoners, then reported their findings to the commissioner of agriculture, but only a portion of them were recorded in their official reports. Following the 1923 legislative session, they were required to conduct their inspections every three weeks. With abundant evidence of harsh labor conditions and peonage in turpentine camps run by the Knabb Turpentine Company being presented and publicized, the Alachua County commissioners canceled their leasing contract and demanded the return of all county inmates.

Inspector Thomas' suspicions of foul play had been aroused by several questionable deaths at the Knabb camp, including that of a black prisoner who had been convicted, sentenced, leased, and found dead within fourteen days. After national newspapers exposed the inhumane conditions at Knabb's turpentine camp, and Knabb was allowed to continue leasing prisoners on his word that conditions would be improved, an anonymous group of businessmen in Macclenny took up a collection and paid the fines owed by the convicts held at the Knabb camp, as reported in the Florida Times-Union on May 1, 1923. Three days later, a fire destroyed most of the business district, and the Hotel Macclenny burnt to the ground.

=== Further abuses exposed at William Knabb's turpentine distillery ===
T.J. Knabb's brother, William Knabb, operated a large turpentine distillery at Macclenny employing several hundred black workers, which was also the subject of national press coverage when similar abuses there were exposed in 1936. According to Florida historian Jerrell H. Shofner, William Knabb's camp "was as repressive as any reported in the state since the turn of the century."

The camp was unfenced, but guards were posted on all roads leading out of town. Men, mostly African American, were held there against their will, generally paid from fifty cents to a dollar a day, and forced to buy provisions at a commissary that charged prices twice those of retailers in the area. Spies were recruited to inform the boss of discontent among the workers, and beatings were administered frequently to maintain control over them.

In 1936, the U.S. solicitor general announced that the Justice Department was again looking into Knabb Turpentine employment practices, citing numerous complaints of involuntary servitude and peonage. In November of that year, William and Earl Knabb, Fred Jones, and Ed Hall were charged with violations of peonage laws and arrested by FBI agents and U.S. Marshals. They pleaded not guilty and were released on bonds of one thousand dollars each. Although the prosecution proved that the chief witness for the defense at the trial in Jacksonville had perjured himself, Knabb and his co-defendants were acquitted by the jury.
