= Slavery among Native Americans in the United States =

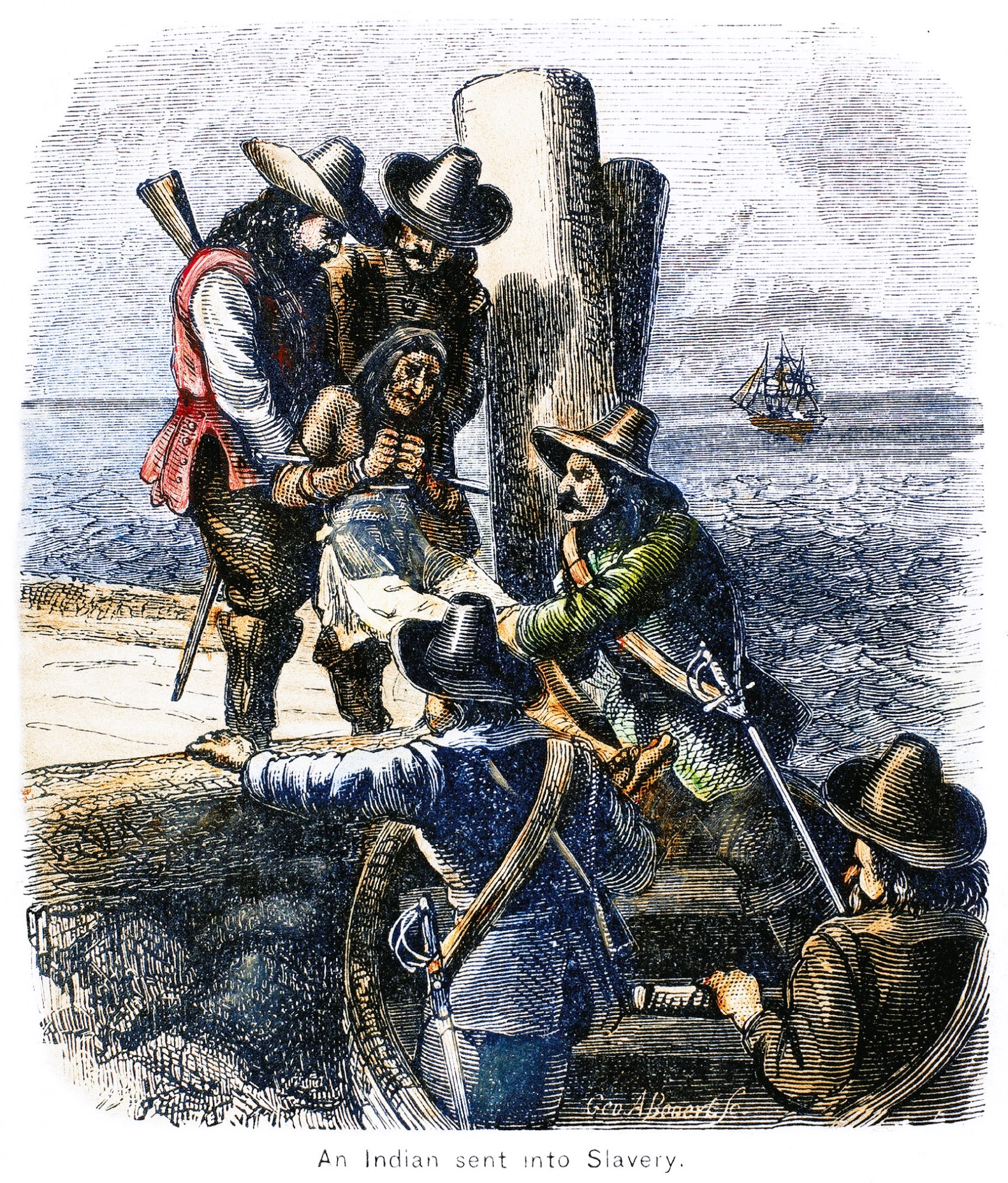
Native American being enslaved by Virginia colonists in the 17th century

Slavery among Native Americans in the United States includes slavery by and enslavement of Native Americans roughly within what is currently the United States of America.

Tribal territories and the slave trade ranged over present-day borders. Some Native American tribes held war captives as slaves prior to and during European colonization. Some Native Americans were captured and sold by others into slavery to Europeans, while others were captured and sold by Europeans themselves. In the late 18th and 19th centuries, a small number of tribes, such as the five so-called "civilized tribes" (Cherokee, Chickasaw, Choctaw, Muscogee and Seminole) began increasing their holdings of African-American slaves.

European contact greatly influenced slavery as it existed among pre-contact Native Americans, particularly in scale. As they raided other tribes to capture slaves for sales to Europeans, they fell into destructive wars among themselves, and against Europeans.

== Traditions of slavery by Native Americans ==
Many Native-American tribes practiced some form of slavery before the European introduction of African slavery into North America.

The Haida and Tlingit peoples who lived along the southeastern Alaskan coast were traditionally known as fierce warriors and slave-traders, raiding as far as California. Slavery was hereditary after slaves were taken as prisoners of war. Among some Pacific Northwest tribes, about a quarter of the population were slaves. Other slave-owning tribes of North America were, for example, Comanche of Texas, Creek of Georgia, the fishing societies, such as the Yurok, that lived along the coast from what is now Alaska to California; the Pawnee, and Klamath.

Some tribes held people as captive slaves late in the 19th century. For instance, "Ute Woman", was a Ute captured by the Arapaho and later sold to a Cheyenne. She was kept by the Cheyenne to be used as a prostitute to serve American soldiers at Cantonment in the Indian Territory. She lived in slavery until about 1880. She died of a hemorrhage resulting from "excessive sexual intercourse".

=== Difference in pre- and post-contact slavery ===
There were differences between slavery as practiced in the pre-colonial era among Native Americans and slavery as practiced by Europeans after colonization. Whereas many Europeans eventually came to look upon slaves of African descent as being racially inferior, Native Americans took slaves from other Native American groups, and therefore viewed them as ethnically inferior.

In some cases, Native American slaves were allowed to live on the fringes of Native American society until they were slowly integrated into the tribe. The word "slave" may not accurately apply to such captive people.

When the Europeans made contact with the Native Americans, they began to participate in the slave trade. Native Americans, in their initial encounters with the Europeans, attempted to use their captives from enemy tribes as a "method of playing one tribe against another" in an unsuccessful game of divide and conquer.

=== Treatment and function of slaves ===
Native American groups often enslaved war captives, whom they primarily used for small-scale labor. Others, however, would stake themselves in gambling situations when they had nothing else, which would put them into servitude for a short time, or in some cases for life; captives were also sometimes tortured as part of religious rites, which sometimes involved ritual cannibalism. During times of famine, some Native Americans would also temporarily sell their children to obtain food.

The ways in which captives were treated differed widely among Native American groups. Captives could be enslaved for life, killed, or adopted. In some cases, captives were only adopted after a period of slavery. For example, the Iroquoian peoples (not just the Iroquois tribes) often adopted captives, but for religious reasons there was a process, procedures, and many seasons when such adoptions were delayed until the proper spiritual times.

In many cases, new tribes adopted captives to replace warriors killed during a raid. Warrior captives were sometimes made to undergo ritual mutilation or torture that could end in death, as part of a spiritual grief ritual for relatives slain in battle. Adoptees were expected to fill the economic, military, and familial roles of the departed loved ones, to fit into the societal shoes of the dead relative, and maintain the spirit power of the tribe.

Captured individuals were sometimes allowed to assimilate into the tribe, and would later produce a family within the tribe. The Creek, who engaged in this practice and had a matrilineal system, treated children born of slaves and Creek women as full members of their mothers' clans and of the tribe, as property and hereditary leadership passed through the maternal line. In the cultural practices of the Iroquoian peoples, also rooted in a matrilineal system with men and women having equal value, any child would have the status determined by the woman's clan. More typically, tribes took women and children captives for adoption, as they tended to adapt more easily into new ways.

Several tribes held captives as hostages for payment. Various tribes also practiced debt slavery or imposed slavery on tribal members who had committed crimes; full tribal status would be restored as the enslaved worked off their obligations to the tribal society. Male warriors in some Native American groups also had a strong interest in obtaining prisoners, as this was seen as proof of one's courage. Other slave-owning tribes of North America included the Comanche of Texas; the Creek of Georgia; the fishing societies, such as the Yurok, who lived in Northern California; the Pawnee; and the Klamath. When St. Augustine, Florida, was founded in 1565, the site already had enslaved Native Americans, whose ancestors had migrated from Cuba.

The Haida and Tlingit, who lived along Alaska's southeast coast, were traditionally known as fierce warriors and slave-traders, raiding as far as California. In their society, slavery was hereditary after slaves were taken as prisoners of war—children of slaves were fated to be slaves themselves. Among a few Pacific Northwest tribes, as many as one-fourth of the population were slaves. They were typically captured by raids on enemy tribes, or purchased on inter-tribal slave markets. Slaves would be bought, sold, or given away at potlatches like any other property. Some were killed ceremonially because of a death or important event; at a potlatch they might be killed to demonstrate their owner's wealth. Slaves were also sometimes freed to show favor to them or to honor a relative.

== European enslavement of Native Americans ==
When Europeans arrived as colonists in North America, Native Americans changed their practice of slavery dramatically. Native Americans began selling war captives to Europeans rather than integrating them into their own societies as some had done before.

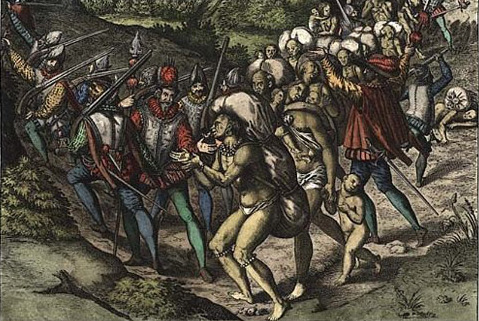
Engraving of Spaniards enslaving Native Americans by Theodor de Bry (1528–1598), published in America. part 6. Frankfurt, 1596.

Native Americans were enslaved by the Spanish in Florida and the Southwest under various legal tools. One tool was the encomienda system; new encomiendas were outlawed in the New Laws of 1542, but old ones continued, and the 1542 restriction was revoked in 1545.

As the demand for labor in the West Indies grew with the cultivation of sugarcane, Europeans exported enslaved Native Americans to the "sugar islands". Historian Alan Gallay estimates that between 1670 and 1715, 24,000 to 51,000 captive Native Americans were exported through Carolina ports, of which more than half, 15,000-30,000, were brought from then-Spanish Florida. These numbers were more than the number of Africans imported to the Carolinas during the same period.

Gallay also says that "the trade in Indian slaves was at the center of the English empire's development in the American South. The trade in Indian slaves was the most important factor affecting the South in the period 1670 to 1715"; intertribal wars to capture slaves destabilized English colonies, Florida and Louisiana. Additional enslaved Native Americans were exported from South Carolina to Virginia, Pennsylvania, New York, Rhode Island and Massachusetts.

Starting in 1698, Parliament allowed competition among importers of enslaved Africans, raising purchase prices for slaves in Africa, so they cost more than enslaved Native Americans.

British settlers, especially those in the Southern Colonies, purchased or captured Native Americans to use as forced labor in cultivating tobacco, rice, and indigo. Accurate records of the numbers enslaved do not exist. Slavery in Colonial America became a caste of people who were foreign to English colonists: Native Americans and Africans, who were predominantly non-Christian. The Virginia General Assembly defined some terms of slavery in 1705:

All servants imported and brought into the Country ... who were not Christians in their native Country ... shall be accounted and be slaves. All Negro, mulatto and Indian slaves within this dominion ... shall be held to be real estate. If any slave resists his master ... correcting such slave, and shall happen to be killed in such correction ... the master shall be free of all punishment ... as if such accident never happened.

The slave trade of Native Americans lasted until around 1730. It gave rise to a series of devastating wars among the tribes, including the Yamasee War. The Indian Wars of the early 18th century, combined with the increasing importation of African slaves, effectively ended the Native American slave trade by 1750. Colonists found that Native American slaves could easily escape, as they knew the country. The wars cost the lives of numerous colonial slave traders and disrupted their early societies. The remaining Native American groups banded together to face the Europeans from a position of strength. Many surviving Native American peoples of the southeast strengthened their loose coalitions of language groups and joined confederacies such as the Choctaw, the Creek, and the Catawba for protection.

Native American women were at risk for rape whether they were enslaved or not; during the early colonial years, settlers were disproportionately male. They turned to Native women for sexual relationships. Both Native American and African enslaved women suffered rape and sexual harassment by male slaveholders and other white men.

The exact number of Native Americans who were enslaved is unknown because vital statistics and census reports were at best infrequent. Andrés Reséndez estimates that between 147,000 and 340,000 Native Americans were enslaved in North America, excluding Mexico. Linford Fisher's estimates 2.5 million to 5.5 million Natives enslaved in the entire Americas. Even though records became more reliable in the later colonial period, Native American slaves received little to no mention, or they were classed with African slaves with no distinction. For example, in the case of "Sarah Chauqum of Rhode Island", her master listed her as mulatto in the bill of sale to Edward Robinson, but she won her freedom by asserting her Narragansett identity.

Little is known about Native Americans that were forced into labor. Two myths have complicated the history of Native American slavery: that Native Americans were undesirable as servants, and that Native Americans were exterminated or pushed out after King Philip's War. The precise legal status for some Native Americans is at times difficult to establish, as involuntary servitude and slavery were poorly defined in 17th-century British North America. Some masters asserted ownership over the children of Native American servants, seeking to turn them into slaves. The historical uniqueness of slavery in America is that European settlers drew a rigid line between insiders, "people like themselves who could never be enslaved", and nonwhite outsiders, "mostly Africans and Native Americans who could be enslaved". A unique feature between natives and colonists was that colonists gradually asserted sovereignty over the native inhabitants during the 17th century, ironically transforming them into subjects with collective rights and privileges that Africans could not enjoy. The West Indies developed as plantation societies prior to the Chesapeake Bay region and had a demand for labor.

In the Spanish colonies, the church assigned Spanish surnames to Native Americans and recorded them as servants rather than slaves. Many members of Native American tribes in the Western United States were taken for life as slaves. In some cases, courts served as conduits for enslavement of Indians, as evidenced by the enslavement of the Hopi man Juan Suñi in 1659 by a court in Santa Fe for theft of food and trinkets from the governor's mansion. In the East, Native Americans were recorded as slaves.

Slaves in Indian Territory across the United States were used for many purposes, from work in the plantations of the East, to guides across the wilderness, to work in deserts of the West, or as soldiers in wars. Native American slaves suffered from European diseases and inhumane treatment, and many died while in captivity.

=== The Indian slave trade ===
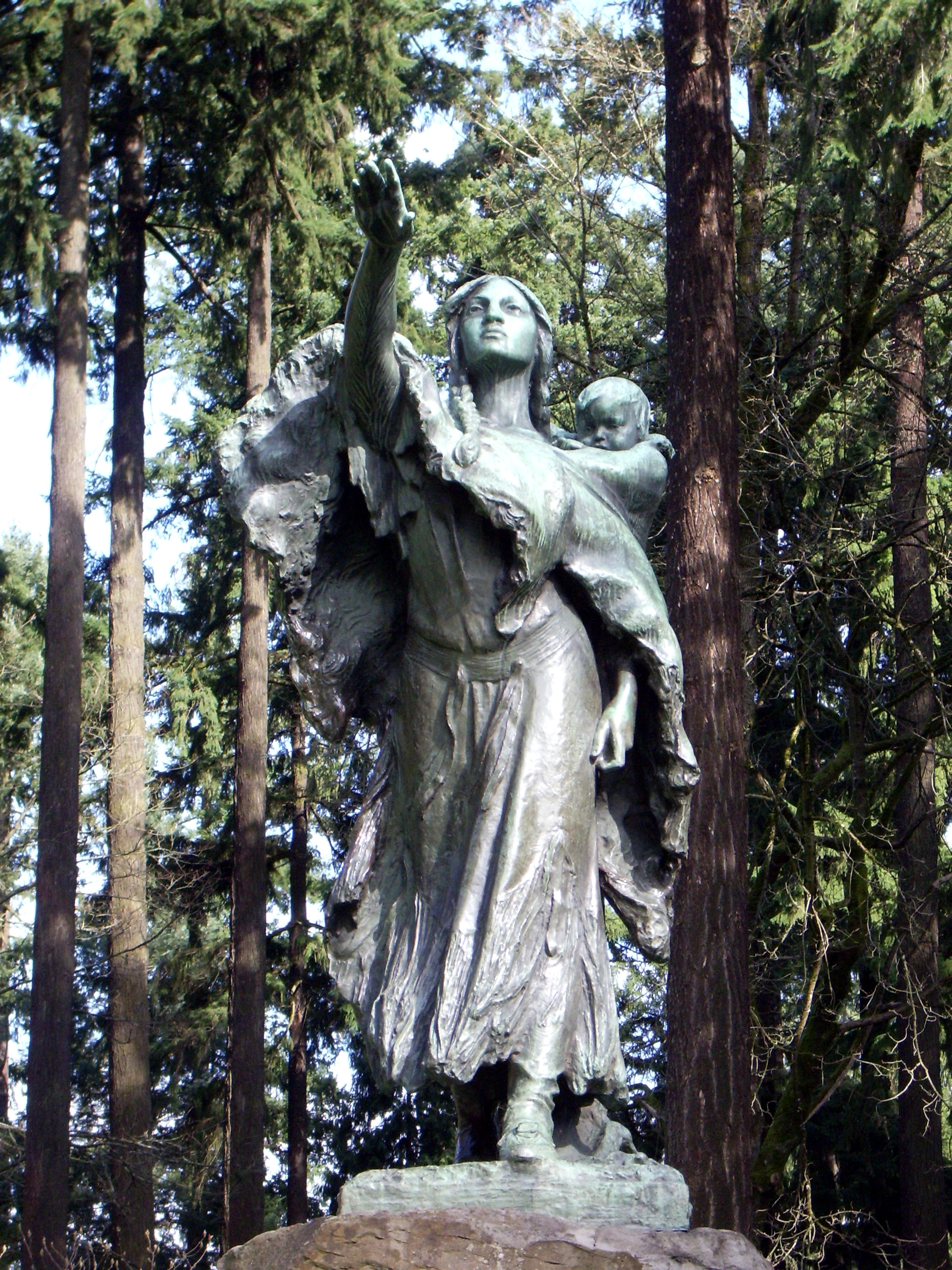
Statue representing Sacagawea (ca. 1788–1812), a Lemhi Shoshone who was taken captive by the Hidatsa people and sold to Toussaint Charbonneau

European colonists caused a change in Native American slavery, as they created a new demand market for captives of raids. Especially in the southern colonies, initially developed for resource exploitation rather than settlement, colonists purchased or captured Native Americans to be used as forced labor in cultivating tobacco, and, by the 18th century, rice, and indigo. To acquire trade goods, Native Americans began selling war captives to whites rather than integrating them into their own societies. Traded goods, such as axes, bronze kettles, Caribbean rum, European jewelry, needles, and scissors, varied among the tribes, but the most prized were rifles. English colonists aped the rationales of their Spanish and Portuguese counterparts: they saw the enslavement of Africans and Native Americans as a moral, legal, and socially acceptable institution; a rationale for enslavement was as part of a "just war", where the taking of captives and using them as slave labour was viewed as an alternative to a death sentence. The escape of Native American slaves was frequent, because they had a better understanding of the land, which African slaves did not. Consequently, the Natives who were captured and sold into slavery were often sent to the West Indies, or far away from their home.

The first African slave on record was located in Jamestown. Before the 1630s, indentured servitude was the dominant form of bondage in the colonies, but by 1636 only Caucasians could lawfully receive contracts as indentured servants. The oldest known record of a permanent Native American slave was a native man from Massachusetts in 1636. By 1661 slavery had become legal in all of the existing colonies. Virginia would later declare that "Indians, Mulattos, and Negros to be real estate", and in 1682, New York forbade African or Native American slaves from leaving their master's home or plantation without permission.

Europeans also viewed the enslavement of Native Americans differently than the enslavement of Africans in some cases; a belief that Africans were "brutish people" was dominant. While both Native Americans and Africans were considered savages, Native Americans were romanticized as noble people that could be elevated into Christian civilization.

=== New England ===
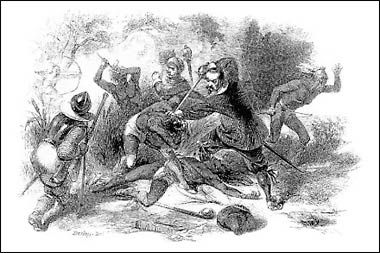
The Pequot War resulted in the enslavement of some of the surviving Pequot by English colonists in New England.

The Pequot War of 1636 led to the enslavement of war captives and other members of the Pequot by Europeans, almost immediately after the founding of Connecticut as a colony. The Pequot thus became an important part of New England's culture of slavery. The Pequot War was devastating: the Niantic, Narragansett, and Mohegan tribes were persuaded into helping the Massachusetts, Connecticut, and Plymouth colonists massacre the Pequot, with at least 700 of the Pequot killed. Most enslaved Pequot were noncombatant women and children, with court records indicating that most served as chattel slaves for life. Some court records show bounties on runaway native slaves more than 10 years after the War. What further aided the Indian slave trade throughout New England and the South was that different tribes did not recognize themselves as members of the same race, dividing the tribes among each other. The Chickasaw and Westos, for example, sold captives of other tribes indiscriminately so as to augment their political and economic power.

Furthermore, Rhode Island also participated in the enslavement of Native Americans, but records are incomplete or non-existent, making the exact number of slaves unknown. The New England governments would promise plunder as part of their payment, and commanders like Israel Stoughton viewed the right to claim Native American women and children as part of their due. Because of lack of records it can only be speculated if the soldiers demanded these captives as sexual slaves or solely as servants. Few colonial leaders questioned the policies of the colonies' treatment of slaves, but Roger Williams, who tried to maintain positive connections with the Narragansett, was conflicted. As a Christian he felt that identifiable Indian murderers "deserved death", but he condemned the murder of Native American women and children, though most of his criticisms were kept private. Massachusetts originally kept peace with the Native American tribes in the region, but that changed, and the enslavement of Native Americans became inevitable. Boston newspapers mention escaped slaves as late as 1750. In 1790, the United States census report indicated that the number of slaves in the state was 6,001, with an unknown proportion of Native Americans, but at least 200 were cited as half-breed Indians (meaning half African). Since Massachusetts took the advance in the fighting of the King Philip's War and the Pequot War; it is most likely the Massachusetts colony greatly exceeded that of either Connecticut or Rhode Island in the number of Native American slaves owned. In 1676, Massachusetts Bay Colony treasurer John Hull arranged public sales of at least 185 Native American captives from King Philip's War into slavery. Hull also transported more than 100 Native Americans to be sold at slave markets in Cádiz and Málaga. New Hampshire was unique: it had very few slaves, and maintained a somewhat peaceful stance with various tribes during the Pequot War and King Philip's War.

Colonists in the South began to capture and enslave Native Americans for sale and export to the "sugar islands" such as Jamaica, as well as to northern colonies. The resulting Native American slave trade devastated the southeastern Native American populations and transformed tribal relations throughout the Southeast. In the 17th and 18th centuries, the English at Charles Town (in modern South Carolina), the Spanish in Florida, and the French in Louisiana sought trading partners and allies among the Native Americans by offering goods such as metal knives, axes, firearms and ammunition, liquor, beads, cloth, and hats in exchange for furs (deerskins) and Native American slaves.

Traders, frontier settlers, and government officials encouraged Native Americans to make war on each other, to reap the profits of the slaves captured in such raids or to weaken the warring tribes. Starting in 1610, the Dutch traders had developed a lucrative trade with the Iroquois. The Iroquois gave the Dutch beaver pelts; in exchange, the Dutch gave them clothing, tools, and firearms, which gave them more power than neighboring tribes had. The trade allowed the Iroquois to have war campaigns against other tribes, like the Eries, Huron, Petun, Shawnee, and the Susquehannocks. The Iroquois also began to take war captives and sell them. The increased power of the Iroquois, combined with the diseases the Europeans unknowingly brought, devastated many eastern tribes.

=== American Southeast ===
Carolina, which originally included today's North Carolina, South Carolina, and Georgia, was unique among the North American English colonies because the colonists thought of slavery as essential to their success. In 1680, proprietors ordered the Carolina government to ensure that enslaved Native Americans had equal justice and to treat them better than African slaves; these regulations were widely publicized, so no one could claim ignorance of them. The change in policy in Carolina was rooted in fear that escaped slaves would inform their tribes, resulting in even more devastating attacks on plantations. The new policy proved almost impossible to enforce, as both colonists and local officials viewed Native Americans and Africans as the same, and the exploitation of both as the easiest way to wealth, though the proprietors continued to attempt to enforce the changes for profit reasons.

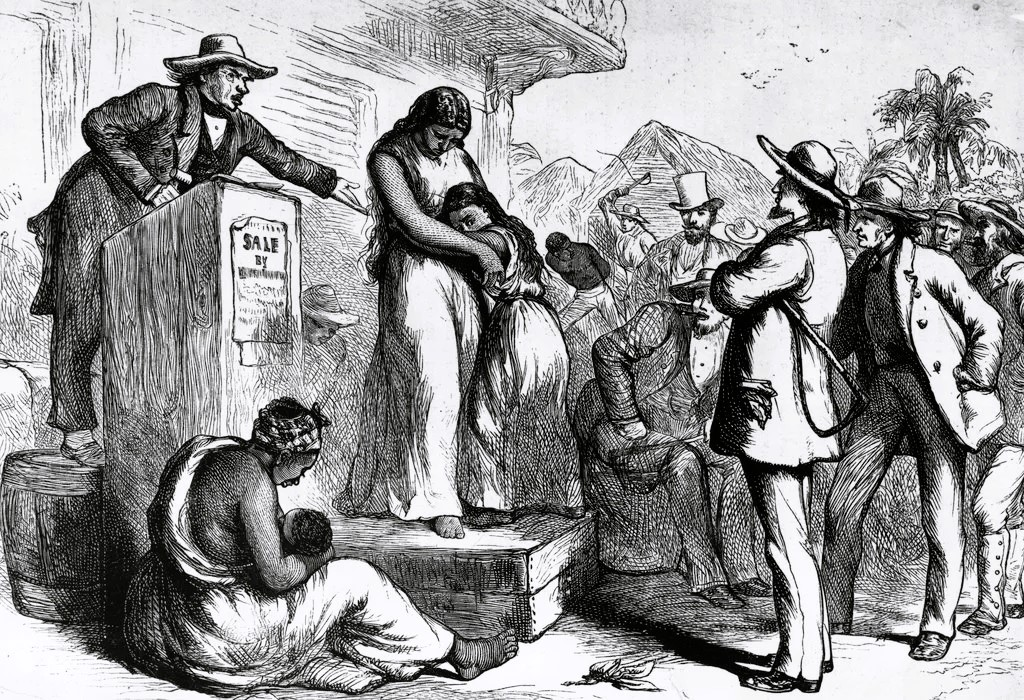
Indigenous and black slaves auction in the United States, 19th century

In the other colonies, slavery developed into a predominant form of labor over time. It is estimated that Carolina traders operating out of Charles Towne exported an estimated 30,000 to 51,000 Native American captives between 1670 and 1715 in a profitable slave trade with the Caribbean, Spanish Hispaniola, and Northern colonies. It was more profitable to have Native American slaves because African slaves had to be shipped and purchased, while native slaves could be captured and immediately taken to plantations; whites in the Northern colonies sometimes preferred Native American slaves, especially Native women and children, to Africans because Native American women were agriculturalist and children could be trained more easily. However, Carolinians had more of a preference for African slaves but also capitalized on the Indian slave trade combining both. In December 1675, Carolina's grand council created a written justification of the enslavement and sale of Native Americans, claiming that those who were enemies of tribes the English colonists had befriended were targets, stating those enslaved were not "innocent Indians". The council also claimed it was within the wishes of their "Indian allies" to take their prisoners and that the prisoners were willing to work in the country or be transported elsewhere. The council used this to please the proprietors, and to fulfill the practice of enslaving no one against their wishes or being transported without their own consent out of Carolina, though this is what the colonists did.

In John Norris' "Profitable Advice for Rich and Poor" (1712), he recommends buying 18 native women, 15 African men, and 3 African women. Slave traders preferred captive Native Americans who were under 18 years old, as they were believed to be more easily trained to new work. In the Illinois Country, French colonists baptized the Native American slaves whom they bought for labor. They believed it essential to convert Native Americans to Catholicism. Church baptismal records have thousands of entries for Indian slaves. In the eastern colonies it became common practice to enslave Native American women and African men with a parallel growth of enslavement for both Africans and Native Americans. This practice also lead to large number of unions between Africans and Native Americans. This practice of combining African slave men and Native American women was especially common in South Carolina. Native American women were cheaper to buy than Native American men or Africans. Moreover, it was more efficient to have native women because they were skilled laborers, the primary agriculturalists in their communities. During this era it was not uncommon for reward notices in colonial newspapers to mention runaway slaves speaking of Africans, Native Americans, and those of a partial mix between them.

Many early laborers, including Africans, entered the colonies as indentured servants and could be free after paying off their passage. Slavery was associated with people who were non-Christian and non-European. In a Virginia General Assembly declaration of 1705, some terms were defined:

And also be in [sic.] enacted, by the authority aforesaid, and it is hereby enacted, That all servants imported and brought into the Country ... who were not christians in their native country, (except ... Turks and Moors in amity with her majesty, and others that can make due proof of their being free in England, or any other christian country, before they were shipped ...) shall be accounted and be slaves, and such be here bought and sold notwithstanding a conversion to christianity afterward. [Section IV.] And if any slave resists his master, or owner, or other person, by his or her order, correcting such slave, and shall happen to be killed in such correction, it shall not be accounted felony; but the master, owner, and every such other person so giving correction, shall be free and acquit of all punishment and accusation for the same, as if such incident had never happened ... [Section XXXIV.]

In the mid-18th century, South Carolina colonial governor James Glen began to promote an official policy that aimed to create in Native Americans an "aversion" to African Americans in an attempt to thwart possible alliances between them. In 1758, James Glen wrote: "It has always been the policy of this government to create an aversion in them Indians to Negroes."

The dominance of the Native American slave trade lasted until around 1730, when it led to a series of devastating wars among the tribes. The slave trade created tensions that were not present among different tribes and even large scale abandonment of original homelands to escape the wars and slave trade. The majority of the Indian wars occurred in the south. The Westos originally lived near Lake Erie in the 1640s but relocated to escape the mourning wars designed to repopulate the Iroquois Confederacy due to large number of deaths due to wars and disease. The Westos eventually moved to Virginia and then South Carolina to take advantage of trading routes. The Westos strongly contributed to the rising involvement of southeastern Native American communities in the Indian slave trade especially with Westos expansion. The increased rise of the gun-slave trade forced the other tribes to participate or their refusal to engage in enslaving meant they would become targets of slavers. Before 1700, the Westos in Carolina dominated much of the Native American slave trade, enslaving natives of southern tribes indiscriminately. The Westos gained power rapidly, but British colonists began to fear them as they were well-armed with a lot of rifle power through trading; from 1680 to 1682, the colonists joined forces with the Savannah, who resented Westo control of the slave trade, and wiped them out- killing most of the men and selling most of the women and children that could be captured. As a result, the Westo tribal group was completely eliminated culturally; its survivors were scattered or else sold into slavery in Antigua. Those Native Americans nearer to European colonial settlements raided tribes farther into the interior in the quest for slaves to be sold, especially to British colonists in Carolina.

In response, the southeastern tribes intensified their warring and hunting, which increasingly challenged their traditional reasons for hunting or warring. The traditional reasoning for war was revenge not for profit. The Chickasaw war parties had pushed the Houmas tribe further south where the tribe struggled to find stability. In 1704, the Chickasaw alliance with the French had weakened, and British colonists used the opportunity to make an alliance with the Chickasaw, bringing them 12 Taensa slaves. In Mississippi and Tennessee the Chickasaw played both the French and British against each other, and preyed on the Choctaw, who were traditional allies of the French, as well as the Arkansas, the Tunica, and the Taensa, establishing slave depots throughout their territories. In 1705, the Chickasaw activated their war parties again, targeting the unexpected Choctaw since a friendship had been established between the two tribes; several Choctaw families were taken into captivity, rekindling a war between the two tribes and ending their alliance. A single Chickasaw raid in 1706 on the Choctaw yielded 300 Native American captives, which were promptly sold to English colonists in Charles Towne. The warring between them continued through the early 18th century with the worse incident for the Choctaw occurring in 1711 as a group of British colonist also attacked the Choctaw simultaneously, fearing them more because they were allies to the French. It is estimated that this conflict, mixed with enslavement and epidemics devastated the Chickasaw. It is estimated that in 1685 their population was 7,000 plus but by 1715 it was as low as 4,000. As the southern tribes continued their involvement in slave trade they became more involved economically and began to amass significant debts. The Yamasee amassed a great debt in 1711 for rum, but the General Assembly had voted to forgive their debts; the tribe replied by stating they were preparing for war to pay their debts. The Indian slave trade began to negatively affect the social organization in many of the southern tribes particularly in gender roles in their communities. As male warriors began to interact more with colonial men and societies which were heavily patriarchal they began to increasingly sought out control over captives to trade with European men. Among the Cherokee the undermining of women's power began to create tensions among their communities e.g. warriors started to undermine women's power to determine when to wage war. In the Cherokee and other tribes' societies, "war women" and "beloved women" were those who had proven themselves in battle, and were respected with vested privileges to decide what to do with captives. The incidents led warring women to dress as traders in effort to get captives before warriors. A similar pattern of friendly and then hostile relations among the English and Native Americans followed in the southeastern colonies.

For example, the Creek, a loose confederacy of many different groups who had banded together to defend themselves against slave-raiding, allying with the English and moving on the Apalachee in Spanish Florida, destroying them as a group of people in the quest for slaves. These raids also destroyed several other Florida tribes, including the Timucua. In 1685, the Yamasee were persuaded by Scottish slave traders to attack the Timucuans, the attack was devastating. Most of the colonial-era Native Americans of Florida were killed, enslaved, or scattered. It is estimated that these raids on Florida yielded 4,000 Native American slaves between 1700 and 1705. A few years later, the Shawnee raided the Cherokee in similar fashion. In North Carolina, the Tuscarora, fearing among other things that encroaching English colonists planned to enslave them as well as take their land, attacked them in a war that lasted from 1711 to 1713. In this war, Carolina settlers, aided by the Yamasee, completely vanquished the Tuscarora, taking thousands of captives as slaves. Within a few years, a similar fate befell the Yuchis and the Yamasee, who had fallen out of favor with the British. The French armed the Natchez tribe, who lived on the banks of the Mississippi, and the Illinois against the Chickasaw. By 1729, the Natchez, along with a number of enslaved and runaway Africans who lived among them, rose up against the French. An army composed of French soldiers, Choctaw warriors, and enslaved Africans defeated them. Trade behavior of several tribes also began to change returning to more traditional ways of adopting war captives instead of immediately selling them to white slave traders or holding them for three days before deciding to sell them or not. This was due to the heavy losses many of the tribes were obtaining in the numerous wars that continued throughout the 18th century.

The lethal combination of slavery, disease, and warfare dramatically decreased the free southern Native American populations; it is estimated that the southern tribes numbered around 199,400 in 1685 but decreased to 90,100 in 1715. The Indian wars of the early 18th century, combined with the growing availability of African slaves, essentially ended the Native American slave trade by 1750. Numerous colonial slave traders had been killed in the fighting, and the remaining Native American groups banded together, more determined to face the Europeans from a position of strength rather than be enslaved. During this time, records also show that many Native American women bought African men, but, unknown to the European sellers, the women freed and married the men into their tribe. Though the Indian slave trade ended the practice of enslaving Native Americans continued, records from June 28, 1771 show Native American children were kept as slaves in Long Island, New York. Native Americans had also married while enslaved creating families both native and some of partial African descent. Occasional mentioning of Native American slaves running away, being bought, or sold along with Africans in newspapers is found throughout the later colonial period. Many of the Native American remnant tribes joined confederacies such as the Choctaw, the Creek, and the Catawba for protection, making them less easy victims of European slavers. There are also many accounts of former slaves mentioning having a parent or grandparent who was Native American or of partial descent.

Records and slave narratives obtained by the WPA (Works Progress Administration) clearly indicate that the enslavement of Native Americans continued in the 1800s, mostly through kidnappings. One example is a documented WPA interview from a former slave, Dennis Grant, whose mother was full-blooded Native American. She was kidnapped as a child near Beaumont, Texas, in the 1850s, and made a slave, later becoming the forced wife of another enslaved person. The abductions showed that even in the 1800s little distinction was still made between African Americans and Native Americans. Both Native American and African-American enslaved people were at risk of sexual abuse by slaveholders and other white men of power. The pressures of slavery also gave way to the creation of colonies of runaway slaves and Native Americans living in Florida, called Maroons.

=== Slavery in the Southwest ===
Enslavement of Indigenous people by Europeans in the present-day Southwest began with Spanish expeditions to explore and conquer land in Central and North America in the 16th century. According to historian Almon Wheeler Lauber these expeditions all captured and enslaved people indigenous to the regions they explored, and in many cases the taking of slaves was as integral a part of these expeditions' goals as conquest and exploration were. Enslavement of Indigenous people by Spanish subjects was theoretically illegal, however the persistence of diverse forms of Indigenous slavery such as encomiendas, repartimientos, congregaciones, and capture in conflicts deemed "just" due to being fought against non-Christians show that this ban was generally enforced poorly or not at all. The 1680 Recopilación de las Leyes de los Reynos de las Indias upheld the ban, but also encouraged Spanish subjects to ransom Indigenous people held by Indigenous captors, convert them to Catholicism, and "detribalize" them through assimilation into Spanish culture. These ransomed captives would be assigned the legal status of "indios de rescate" (reformed Indigenous), and owed their ransomers loyalty and service in exchange for the cost of the ransom. As servants, the treatment of these people fell under the laws governing slavery. Continued enslavement of Indigenous people was justified by their Spanish captors through Christian theories of "just war", which held that slavery was justified as a means of converting those who rejected Christianity. Captives taken in just wars were generally expected to be freed following a finite term of ten to twenty years, but this was not well-enforced and public opinion sometimes dictated that perpetual servitude was more appropriate. The practice of procuring slaves through "just" wars declined in popularity following the 1692-1695 Spanish Reconquest of New Mexico. During the 18th and early 19th centuries, the slave trade in New Mexico took two main forms: large-scale annual trading fairs in which captives were formally ransomed, and small-scale bartering over captives in villages and trading places. Historian James F Brooks estimates that around 3 thousand members of nomadic and pastoralist Indigenous groups bordering New Mexico entered colonial society as slaves, servants, or orphans in this period. The practice surged in popularity following the expulsion of the Navajo from their lands in the 1864–1865 Navajo Campaign, with between 1,500 and 3,000 Indigenous people being enslaved in the territory at the time. During the 1860s the Federal government stamped down on the enslavement of Indigenous people. While this reduced the frequency of the practice it was never fully stamped out, continuing on into at least the 1960s. Following the 1847–1848 invasion by U.S. troops, indigenous peoples in California were enslaved in the new state from statehood in 1850 to 1867. Enslaving an Indigenous person required the posting of a bond by the slave holder. Enslavement occurred through raids and through a four-month servitude imposed in 1846 as a punishment for Indigenous "vagrancy".

=== Utah territory ===
In 1847, Mormon pioneers began occupying Native American land in the Great Basin and formed the Utah Territory. Top leader of the Church of Jesus Christ of Latter-day Saints (LDS Church) and territory governor Brigham Young led the theocratic government, and officially legalized Native American slavery there in 1852. Within a decade over 400 Native American children were purchased and used as a vital source of labor in Latter-day Saint homes until slavery was banned by the federal government in 1865. US representative Justin Smith Morrill criticized LDS Church leaders and their theocratic laws on Indian slavery. He said that the laws were unconcerned about the way the Native Americans were captured, noting that the only requirement was that the Indian be possessed by a White person through purchase or otherwise. He said that Utah was the only American government to enslave Indians, and said that state-sanctioned slavery of Native Americans "is a dreg placed at the bottom of the cup by Utah alone". Within 50 years of Mormon settlement under Young and his successors John Taylor then Wilford Woodruff, the Native American population in what is now Utah was decimated by 86%, and made up only 1.6% of Utah's population in 1890.

== Native-American enslavement of Africans ==
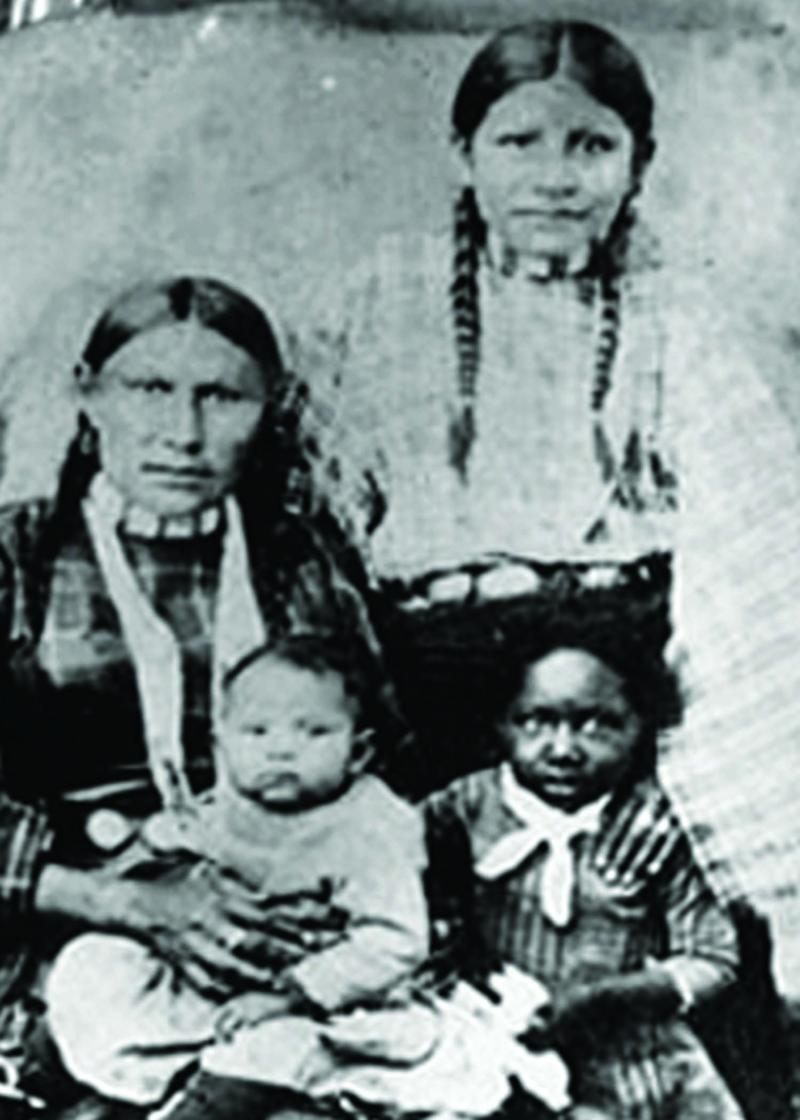
L to R: Mrs. Amos Chapman, her daughter, sister (all Cheyenne), and an unidentified girl of African-American descent. 1886

The earliest record of African and Native American contact occurred in April 1502, when Spanish explorers brought an African slave with them and encountered a Native American band. In the 16th century, Spanish settlements like St. Augustine and San Marcos coalesced along the coast of what is now Florida. In some instances, Native Americans and African Americans allied against European forces. In 1686, the Yamasee Indians fought alongside captive Africans in an attack on a garrison in South Carolina. The Spanish, looking for protection and minimal conflict, offered the captives freedom if they defended Spanish Florida. Thereafter, in the early colonial days, Native Americans interacted with enslaved Africans and African Americans in every way possible; Native Americans were enslaved along with Africans, and both often worked with European indentured laborers. "They worked together, lived together in communal quarters, produced collective recipes for food, shared herbal remedies, myths and legends, and in the end they intermarried."

Because both races were non-Christian, and because of their differing skin color and physical features, Europeans considered them other and inferior to Europeans. The Europeans thus worked to make enemies of the two groups. In some areas, Native Americans began to slowly absorb white culture, and in time some Native American tribes came to own African slaves.

=== Native American slavery in the Southeast ===
The Cherokee, Choctaw, Chickasaw, Creek, and Seminole made the largest efforts of all the Native American peoples to assimilate into white society by implementing some of the practices which they saw as beneficial; adoption of slavery was one of them. They were the most receptive to whites' pressures to adopt European cultures. The pressures from European Americans to assimilate, the economic shift of furs and deerskins, and the government's continued attempts to "civilize" native tribes in the south led to them adopting an economy based on agriculture. A small number of Catawba owned Black slaves as well.

Slavery itself was not a new concept to indigenous American peoples as in inter-Native American conflict tribes often kept prisoners of war, but these captures often replaced slain tribe members. Native Americans did not originally distinguish between groups of people based on color, but rather traditions. There are conflicting theories as to what caused the shift between traditional Native American servitude and the enslavement the Five Civilized Tribes adopted. One theory is that the "civilized" tribes adopted slavery as a means to defend themselves from federal pressure believing that it would help them maintain their southern lands. Another narrative postulates that Native Americans began to feed into the European belief that Africans were inferior to whites and themselves. Some indigenous nations, such as the Chickasaws and the Choctaws, began to embrace the concept that African bodies were property, and equated blackness to hereditary inferiority. In either case, "The system of racial classification and hierarchy took shape as Europeans and Euro-Americans sought to subordinate and exploit Native Americans' and Africans' land, bodies, and labor. Whether strategically or racially motivated the slave trade promoted African slaves owned by Native Americans which led to new power relations among Native societies, elevating groups such as the Five Civilized Tribes to power and serving, ironically, to preserve native order.

=== Slavery in the Indian Territory ===
By the 1830s, most members of the Five Civilized Tribes were relocated, the majority having been forcibly moved to Indian Territory (later, the state of Oklahoma). This relocation, known as the Trail of Tears, brought along with it the practice of Native Americans owning enslaved Africans. Of the estimated 4,500 to 5,000 Black slaves in the Indian Territory by 1839, a great majority were owned by people of mixed European and Native American ancestry.

=== Other Native Americans' responses to African slavery ===
Tensions varied between African Americans and Native Americans in the South, as each nation dealt with the ideology behind the enslavement of Africans differently. In the late 1700s and 1800s, some Native American nations gave sanctuary to runaway slaves while others were more likely to capture them, and return them to their white masters or even re-enslave them. Still others incorporated runaway slaves into their societies, sometimes resulting in intermarriage between the Africans and Native Americans, which was commonplace among tribes like the Creek and Seminole. Some Native Americans may have had a strong dislike of slavery, because they too were seen as a people of a subordinate race than whites of European descent, they lacked the political power to influence the racialistic culture that pervaded the Non-Indian South. It is unclear if some Native American slaveholders sympathized with African-American slaves along racial lines. Missionary work was an efficient method the United States used to persuade Native Americans to accept European methods of living. Missionaries vociferously denounced Indian removal as cruel, oppressive, and feared such actions would push Native Americans away from converting. These same missionaries reported that Native American slave owners were brutal masters, even though accounts of Indian freedmen gave different accounts of being treated relatively well without tyrannical treatment.

=== American Civil War ===
Native American groups differed in their attitudes during the American Civil War. Some of those who fought in the war served the Confederacy, in part to protect slavery in their territories and also because the Confederate government had promised to recognize an independent Native American country after the war. Other traditionalist groups, such as Pin Indians and the intertribal Four Mothers Society, were outspoken opponents of slavery during the war.

== See also ==
- Act for the Government and Protection of Indians (1850, California)
- Act for the relief of Indian Slaves and Prisoners (1852, Utah Territory)
- American Civil War
- Native American slave ownership
- Fugitive Slave Act
- History of unfree labor in the United States
- Indian slave trade between Barbados and South Carolina
- Mission Indians
- Mississippian shatter zone
- Native Americans in the American Civil War
- Native Americans in the United States
- Peonage Act of 1867
- Pueblo Revolt
- Slavery in pre-Columbian America
- Slavery in the colonial history of the United States
- Slavery in the United States
- United States labor law
