= Clara, Florida =

Coordinates: 29.797°N 83.32°W

Clara is an area in Taylor County, on the border with Dixie County, Florida. It is between Perry and Cross City on U.S. Route 98 in Florida. The area around Clara was home to Putnam Lumber Company operations in the early 1920s, a business that became infamous for its use of convict leased labor after the brutal death by whipping of Martin Tabert. Marjory Stoneman Douglas wrote a poem, Martin Tabert of North Dakota is Walking Florida Now, about the killing.
