= Peonage Act of 1867 =

US legislation

The Peonage Abolition Act of 1867 was an Act passed by the U.S. Congress on March 2, 1867, that abolished peonage in the New Mexico Territory and elsewhere in the United States.

Designed to help enforce the Thirteenth Amendment, the Act declares that holding any person to service or labor under the peonage system is unlawful and forever prohibited. It defines peonage as the "voluntary or involuntary service or labor of any persons . . . in liquidation of any debt or obligation."

Violations of the Act were punishable by fines and imprisonment.

== Background ==
Both Indian slavery and peonage were historically practiced by New Mexico's Hispano population, though they were never legally sanctioned. Peonage was a form of debt slavery. Peons were poor Hispano or Genízaro workers indebted to wealthy landowners whom they served. Northern abolitionists frequently condemned this system.

In the 1850s, New Mexico adopted a pro-slavery position. New Mexico's territorial legislature passed a law restricting the presence of free blacks and established a slave code. Given the minuscule number of people actually affected by those laws, it's likely they were intended to please Southern politicians in exchange for federal investment. Though these laws didn't mention peonage or Indian slavery, wealthy Hispanos hoped they would serve to protect their system as well.

After the Thirteenth Amendment was passed, federal officials sought to end peonage. In June 1865, President Andrew Johnson issued a proclamation ordering federal employees to work to discontinue the practice. Later, on January 26, 1867, Senator Henry Wilson of Massachusetts introduced bill S. 543, which would become the Peonage Act of 1867. It was backed by Radical Republicans in Congress and by Stephen Elkins, alleged member of the Santa Fe Ring. It was passed on March 2, 1867, and shortly after signed into law.

== Text ==
AN ACT

To abolish and forever prohibit the System of Peonage in the Territory of New Mexico and other Parts of the United States. Be it enacted by the Senate and House of Representatives of the United States of America in Congress assembled, That the holding of any person to service or labor under the system known as peonage is hereby declared to be unlawful, and the same is hereby abolished and forever prohibited in the Territory of New Mexico, or in any other Territory or State of the United States; and all acts, laws, resolutions, orders, regulations, or usages of the Territory of New Mexico, or of any other Territory or State of the United States, which have heretofore established, maintained, or enforced, or by virtue of which any attempt shall hereafter be made to establish, maintain, or enforce, directly or indirectly, the voluntary or involuntary service or labor of any persons as peons, in liquidation of any debt or obligation, or otherwise, be, and the same are hereby, declared null and void; and any person or persons who shall hold, arrest, or return, or cause to be held, arrested, or returned, or in any manner aid in the arrest or return of any person or persons to a condition of peonage, shall, upon conviction, be punished by fine not less than one thousand nor more than five thousand dollars, or by imprisonment not less than one nor more than five years, or both, at the discretion of the court.

Sec. 2. And be it further enacted, That it shall be the duty of all persons in the military or civil service in the Territory of New Mexico to aid in the enforcement of the foregoing section of this act; and any person or persons who shall obstruct or attempt to obstruct, or in any way interfere with, or prevent the enforcement of this act, shall be liable to the pains and penalties hereby provided; and any officer or other person in the military service of the United States who shall so offend, directly or indirectly, shall, on conviction before a court-martial, be dishonorably dismissed the service of the United States, and shall thereafter be ineligible to reappointment to any office of trust, honor, or profit under the government.

Approved, March 2, 1867.

== See also ==
- United States labor law
- Genízaros

== Sources ==
- United States Statutes at Large, 39th Cong., Sess. II., Chp. 187, p. 546
- Wasniewski, M.A.; Kowalewski, A.; O'Hara, L.T.; Rucker, T. (2014). Hispanic Americans in Congress, 1822-2012. House document. U.S. Government Printing Office. pp. 49–52. ISBN 978-0-16-092028-8.
