= Sugar Land 95 =

Group of victims of the convict leasing system

The Sugar Land 95 were a group of 95 African American victims of the convict-leasing system whose remains were accidentally discovered during construction of the James Reese Career and Technical Center in Sugar Land, Texas.

== Background ==
After the 13th Amendment outlawed slavery in America, many southern business owners whose workforce was made up nearly entirely of slaves needed to find methods to replace their now-freed slaves. The need for cheap labor in the southern states resulted in the creation of the Black Codes, state laws meant to restrict the freedom of African Americans post-Civil-War and ensure that they would remain a source of inexpensive labor.

The codes exploited a loophole in the 13th Amendment where slavery was disallowed "except as a punishment for crime whereof the party shall have been duly convicted." The Codes criminalized vagrancy, where unemployed African Americans could be criminalized and used in forced-labor projects. Freedmen were often forced to sign annual labor contracts with white landowners for work. The terms of these contracts often mirrored conditions under pre-Civil-War slavery, where African American workers would receive the lowest-possible pay for their work. They could also have wages deducted for loosely-defined acts such as "disobedience", "waste of time", or "absence from home without permission". Failure to sign a contract could result in imprisonment or a fine, the former of which was likely to result in becoming a leased convict.

== Discovery ==
In 2017, the Fort Bend ISD Board of Trustees approved construction of the James Reese Career and Technical Center, a school where students attending Fort Bend high schools can obtain specialized education in certain Career and Technical Education sectors, including but not limited to agriculture, culinary arts, and law enforcement.

In February 2018, construction crews first accidentally unearthed human remains while backfilling a trench. Under the guidance of the Texas Historical Commission and with assistance from archaeologists, the remains of 95 separate individuals were located, 94 men and 1 individual presumed to be a woman. They were discovered on the Sartartia Plantation, a sugar plantation owned by Littleberry Ambrose Ellis, a former colonel in the confederate army. The skeletons showed signs of repeated abuses such as corporal punishment, inadequate clothing, starvation, and severe exhaustion. Gunshot wounds were also found, which were likely a result of failed escape attempts.

== Legacy ==
The discovery of the remains is still the largest discovery of remains associated with convict leasing in America. In 2019, all remains were reinterred in marked graves in their original resting places. There are ongoing efforts to identify descendants of the victims via DNA analysis. The Texas Historical Commission awarded a historical marker to the burial site on June 19 2025, coinciding with a Juneteenth festival the same day. In December 2025, Fort Bend County approved a $1.5 million spending plan to construct a memorial for the victims.
