= Munich, North Dakota =

- City
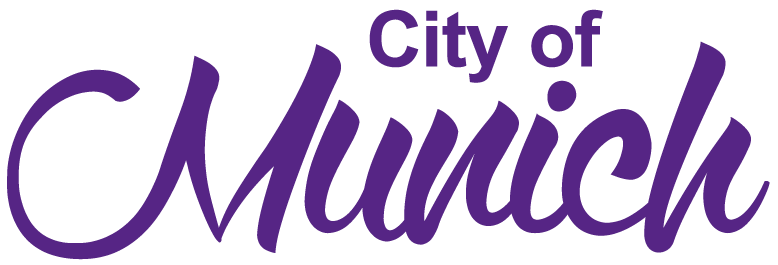
- Logo

- Location of Munich, North Dakota
- Coordinates: 48°40′22″N 98°50′18″W
- Country: United States
- State: North Dakota
- County: Cavalier
- Founded: 1904

Area
  - Total: 1.44 sq mi (3.72 km^{2})
  - Land: 1.43 sq mi (3.71 km^{2})
  - Water: 0.0039 sq mi (0.01 km^{2})
- Elevation: 1,601 ft (488 m)

Population (2020)
  - Total: 190
  - Estimate (2022): 188
  - Density: 133/sq mi (51.2/km^{2})
- Time zone: UTC-6 (Central (CST))
  - Summer (DST): UTC-5 (CDT)
- ZIP code: 58352
- Area code: 701
- FIPS code: 38-55020
- GNIS feature ID: 1036173
- Website: cityofmunichnd.com

Munich is a city in Cavalier County, North Dakota, United States. The population was 190 at the 2020 census.

== History ==
Munich was founded in 1904 and is named after Munich, Germany.

== Geography ==
According to the United States Census Bureau, the city has a total area of 1.44 square miles (3.73 km^{2}), of which 1.43 square miles (3.70 km^{2}) is land and 0.01 square miles (0.03 km^{2}) is water.

== Demographics ==
Historical population
Census	Pop.	Note	%±
1920	248		—
1930	260		4.8%
1940	216		−16.9%
1950	248		14.8%
1960	213		−14.1%
1970	249		16.9%
1980	300		20.5%
1990	310		3.3%
2000	268		−13.5%
2010	210		−21.6%
2020	190		−9.5%
2022 (est.)	188		−1.1%
U.S. Decennial Census; 2020 Census

=== 2010 census ===
As of the census of 2010, there were 210 people, 100 households, and 61 families residing in the city. The population density was 146.9 inhabitants per square mile (56.7/km^{2}). There were 116 housing units at an average density of 81.1 per square mile (31.3/km^{2}). The racial makeup of the city was 99.5% White and 0.5% from two or more races.

There were 100 households, of which 21.0% had children under the age of 18 living with them, 59.0% were married couples living together, 1.0% had a female householder with no husband present, 1.0% had a male householder with no wife present, and 39.0% were non-families. 37.0% of all households were made up of individuals, and 15% had someone living alone who was 65 years of age or older. The average household size was 2.10 and the average family size was 2.77.

The median age in the city was 50.4 years. 21.4% of residents were under the age of 18; 3.4% were between the ages of 18 and 24; 18.6% were from 25 to 44; 32.4% were from 45 to 64; and 24.3% were 65 years of age or older. The gender makeup of the city was 52.4% male and 47.6% female.

=== 2000 census ===
As of the census of 2000, there were 268 people, 112 households, and 73 families residing in the city. The population density was 436.3 inhabitants per square mile (168.5/km^{2}). There were 124 housing units at an average density of 201.9 per square mile (78.0/km^{2}). The racial makeup of the city was 97.76% White, 0.37% from other races, and 1.87% from two or more races. Hispanic or Latino of any race were 0.75% of the population.

There were 112 households, out of which 28.6% had children under the age of 18 living with them, 60.7% were married couples living together, 3.6% had a female householder with no husband present, and 34.8% were non-families. 33.9% of all households were made up of individuals, and 20.5% had someone living alone who was 65 years of age or older. The average household size was 2.39 and the average family size was 3.01.

In the city, the population was spread out, with 28.0% under the age of 18, 1.9% from 18 to 24, 22.8% from 25 to 44, 25.7% from 45 to 64, and 21.6% who were 65 years of age or older. The median age was 44 years. For every 100 females, there were 88.7 males. For every 100 females age 18 and over, there were 89.2 males.

The median income for a household in the city was $25,156, and the median income for a family was $38,125. Males had a median income of $21,750 versus $19,375 for females. The per capita income for the city was $16,849. About 6.3% of families and 11.4% of the population were below the poverty line, including none of those under the age of eighteen and 12.3% of those 65 or over.

== Education ==
Munich is served by the Munich Public School District, located in Munich. The two schools in the district are Munich Elementary School and Munich High School.

== Notable people ==
- Quentin Burdick, U.S. senator from North Dakota
- Martin Tabert, victim of involuntary servitude and murder in Leon County, Florida

== Climate ==
This climatic region is typified by large seasonal temperature differences, with warm to hot (and often humid) summers and cold (sometimes severely cold) winters. According to the Köppen Climate Classification system, Munich has a humid continental climate, abbreviated Dfb on climate maps.
