= Martin Tabert =

American man beaten to death by a prison supervisor in 1922

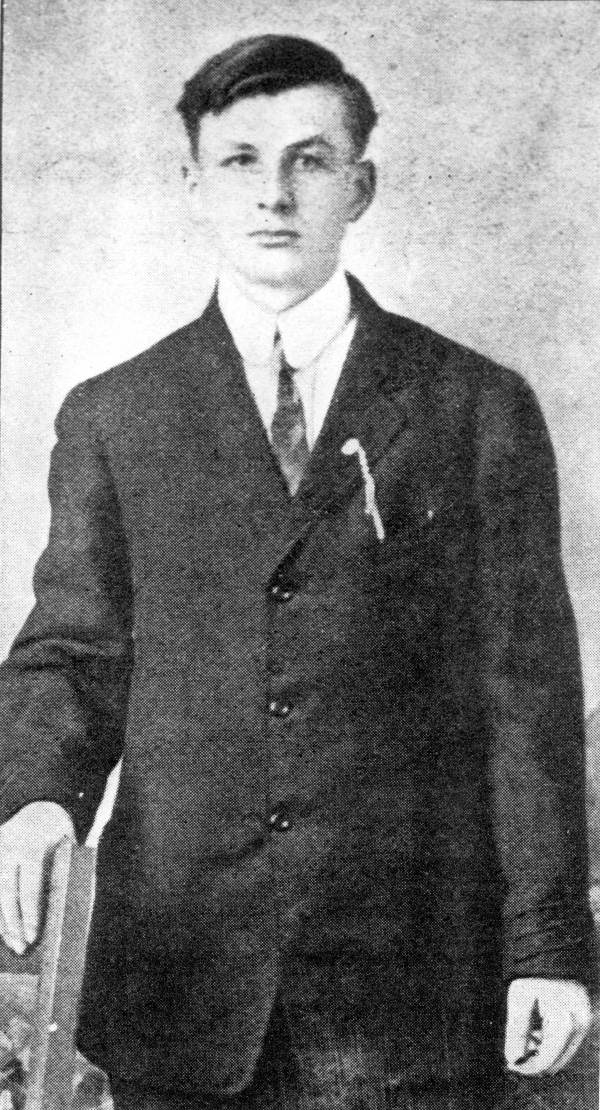
- Martin Tabert (1921)
- Born: 1899; Cavalier County, North Dakota, U.S.
- Died: February 2, 1922 (aged 22); Clara, Florida, U.S.
- Criminal charges: Vagrancy
- Criminal penalty: Fine of $25; later sentenced to convict leasing

Martin Tabert (1899 – February 2, 1922) was an American forced laborer. The circumstances of Tabert's death – being a white man beaten to death by an overseer – caused a public reaction that resulted eventually in the end of Florida’s longstanding convict leasing system. Convict leasing was one of the forms of legalized involuntary servitude common in the American South from the 1880s through the 1940s. Pursuant to Section 1 of the Thirteenth Amendment to the Constitution of the United States, "slavery or involuntary servitude remains lawful as a punishment for crime whereof the party shall have been duly convicted."

Tabert was a 22-year-old man from Munich, North Dakota, who was arrested in December 1921 as part of a police mass-arrest sweep, on a charge of vagrancy, for being on a train without a ticket in Tallahassee, Florida. Tabert was convicted and fined $25 (equivalent to about a week's wages). Although his parents sent $50 to pay the fine, plus $25 more so Tabert could afford transportation back home to North Dakota, their money disappeared in the Leon County prison system, where Sheriff James Robert Jones received $20 for each prisoner he leased out as cheap labor to local businesses. The sheriff sent Tabert to work at the Putnam Lumber Company in Clara, Florida, approximately 60 miles (97 km) south of Tallahassee in Taylor County, about 1.5 miles west of the Steinhatchee River boundary with Dixie County, where the Putnam Lumber Co. headquarters were located in the town of Shamrock, Florida.

In February 1922, Tabert was whipped with a leather strap by supervisor (also known as a "whipping boss") Thomas Walter Higginbotham. It was alleged that Tabert was whipped approximately 150 times: 30–50 times initially, knocking him to the ground; at least another 30 times, when he was ordered to get up but did not (or could not); and further as the overseer chased Tabert through the work camp. Tabert ultimately made it back to his bed, where he died of his injuries just hours later. Higginbotham was later convicted of second degree murder for killing Tabert and sentenced to 20 years in prison. The conviction was reversed by the Supreme Court of Florida on the ground that the trial was brought in the wrong county. The New York World earned the Pulitzer Prize for Public Service. Florida governor Cary A. Hardee ended Florida's system of convict leasing in 1923, in part due to public revulsion resulting from the widespread publicity concerning the conviction of Higginbotham and concern about the effect of the publicity on the state's tourist trade.

The whip used on Tabert was of a type known as a "Black Aunty", a leather whip measuring 5.5 feet (1.7 m) in length and weighing 7.5 pounds (3.4 kg). Marjory Stoneman Douglas wrote a poem about the killing.
