= Inquilino =

Historical social designation

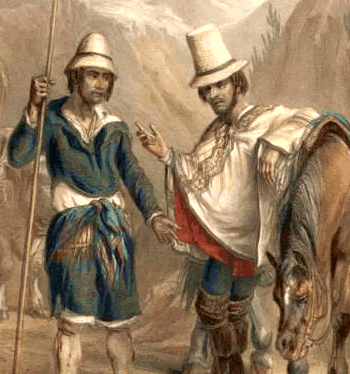
Depiction of an inquilino (left) and a foreman (right) in rural 19th-century Chile. Illustration by Claudio Gay, Paris, 1854.

In historical Chilean agriculture, an inquilino was a laborer who was indebted to a landlord and allowed to establish a farm on certain portions of the landlord's property, typically in marginal lands to deter intruders. In return, the inquilino worked without salary for the landlord. These inquilinos played a crucial role in tasks such as livestock gathering (rodeo) and slaughter. In regions focused on wheat production, the responsibilities of inquilinos increased as the Chilean wheat cycle progressed from the 18th century onwards.

The inquilinaje institution, which characterized a significant part of Chilean agriculture, was abolished by the Chilean land reform during the 1960s and early 1970s. Historian Mario Góngora has conducted extensive research on the history of inquilinos. In modern Spanish, the word "inquilino" carries the same meaning as the English term "tenant".

== See also ==
- Crofting
- Tenant farmer
