= History of forced labor in the United States =

The history of forced labor in the United States encompasses to all forms of unfree labor which have occurred within the present day borders of the United States through the modern era. "Unfree labor" is a generic or collective term for those work relations, in which people are employed against their will by the threat of destitution, detention, violence (including death), lawful compulsion, or other extreme hardship to themselves or to members of their families.

The arrival of the Europeans ushered in the Atlantic slave trade, where Africans were sold into chattel slavery into the Americas. It lasted from the 15th through 19th centuries and was the largest legal form of unfree labor in the history of the United States, reaching 4 million slaves at its height. Slavery and involuntary servitude were made illegal through the thirteenth amendment, except as punishment for a crime. However, unfree labor still existed legally in the form of the peonage system, especially in the New Mexico Territory, debt bondage, penal labor and convict leasing, and debt bondage such as the truck system, as well as many illegal forms of unfree labor, particularly sexual slavery.

Labor reforms in the 19th and 20th eventually outlawed many of these forms of labors. However, illegal unfree labor in the form of human trafficking continued to grow, and the economy continued to rely on unfree labor from abroad. Starting at the end of the 20th century, there became an increased public awareness of human trafficking. More anti-human trafficking groups began to form and anti-human trafficking laws began to be passed, though the extent of the laws and the implementation varies widely from state to state. The U.S. Justice Department estimates that 17,500 people are trafficked into the country every year, but the true figure could be higher, because of the large numbers of undocumented immigrants. Those being trafficked include young children, teenagers, men and women and can be domestic citizens or foreign nationals. According to the Department of State's statistics from 2000, there are approximately 244,000 American children and youth that are at risk for sex trafficking each year. Of these children and youth, 38,600 were originally runaways.

== Traditions of Native American slavery ==
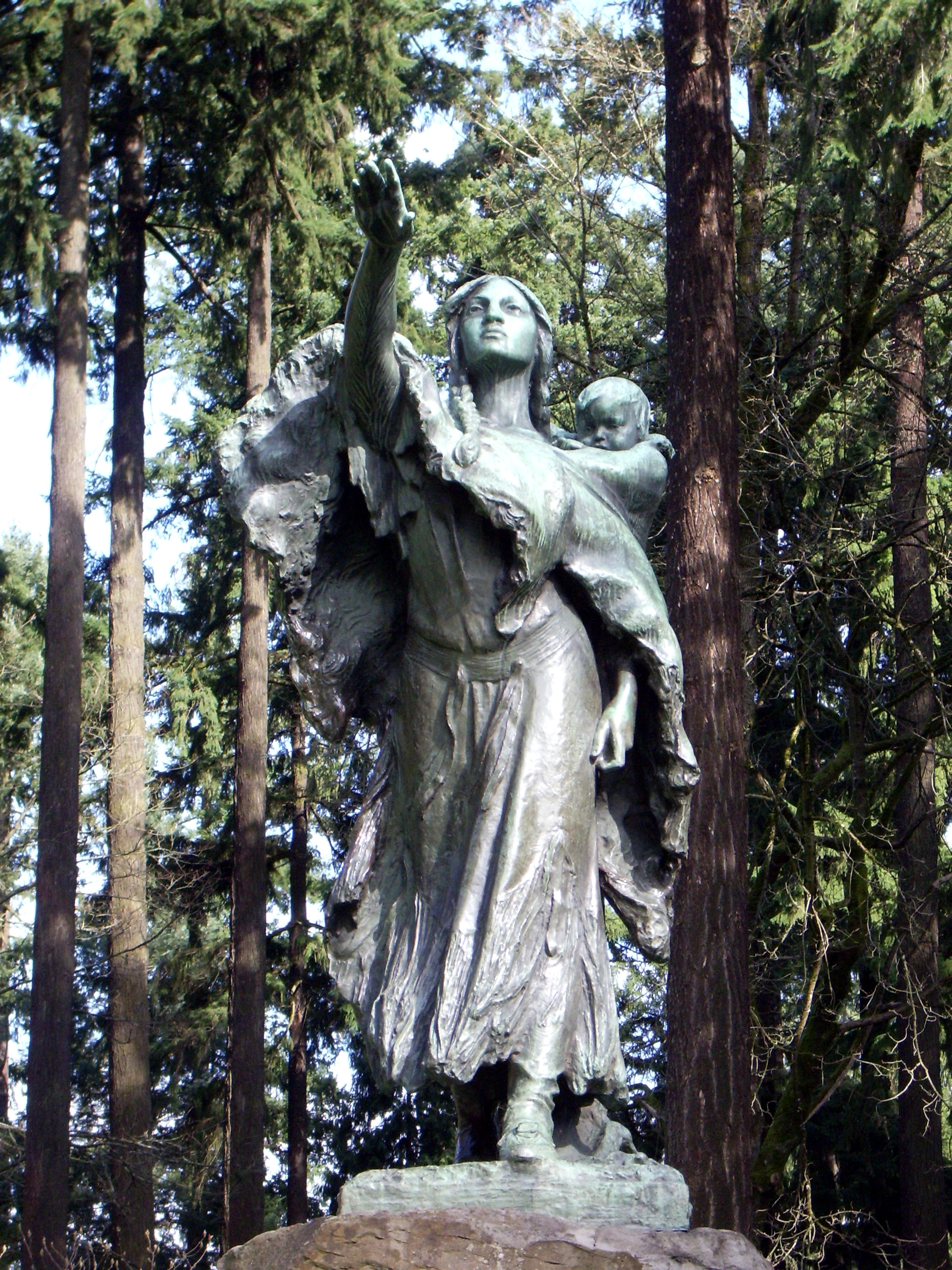
Statue representing Sacagawea (ca. 1788–1812), a Lemhi Shoshone who was taken captive by the Hidatsa people and sold to Toussaint Charbonneau

Native American groups often enslaved war captives whom they primarily used for small-scale labor. Some, however, were used in ritual sacrifice. While little is known, there is little evidence that the slaveholders considered the slaves as racially inferior; they came from other Native American tribes and were casualties of war. Native Americans did not buy and sell captives in the pre-colonial era, although they sometimes exchanged enslaved individuals with other tribes in peace gestures or in exchange for redeeming their own members. The word "slave" may not accurately apply to such captive people. Most of these so-called Native American slaves tended to live on the fringes of Native American society and were slowly integrated into the tribe.

In many cases, new tribes adopted captives to replace warriors killed during a raid. Warrior captives were sometimes made to undergo ritual mutilation or torture that could end in death as part of a grief ritual for relatives slain in battle. Some Native Americans would cut off one foot of captives to keep them from running away. Others allowed enslaved male captives to marry the widows of slain husbands. The Creek, who engaged in this practice and had a matrilineal system, treated children born of slaves and Creek women as full members of their mothers' clans and of the tribe, as property and hereditary leadership passed through the maternal line. The children did not have slave status. More typically, tribes took women and children for captives for adoption, as they tended to adapt more easily into new ways.

Several tribes held captives as hostages for payment. Various tribes also practiced debt slavery or imposed slavery on tribal members who had committed crimes; full tribal status would be restored as the enslaved worked off their obligations to the tribal society. Other slave-owning tribes of North America included the Comanche of Texas, the Creek of Georgia; the fishing societies, such as the Yurok, who lived in Northern California; the Pawnee, and the Klamath.

When the Europeans made contact with the Native Americans, they began to participate in the slave trade. Native Americans, in their initial encounters with the Europeans, attempted to use their captives from enemy tribes as a “method of playing one tribe against another” in an unsuccessful game of divide and conquer.

The Haida and Tlingit who lived along southeast Alaska's coast were traditionally known as fierce warriors and slave-traders, raiding as far as California. In their society, slavery was hereditary after slaves were taken as prisoners of war. Among some Pacific Northwest tribes, as many as one-fourth of the population were slaves.

== Legal chattel slavery ==
An animation showing when United States territories and states forbade or allowed slavery, 1789–1861.

By the time of the American Revolution (1775–1783), the status of slave had been institutionalized as a racial caste associated with African ancestry. When the United States Constitution was ratified in 1789, a relatively small number of free people of color were among the voting citizens. During and immediately following the Revolutionary War, abolitionist laws were passed in most Northern states and a movement developed to abolish slavery. Most of these states had a higher proportion of free labor than in the South and economies based on different industries. They abolished slavery by the end of the 18th century, some with gradual systems that kept adults as slaves for two decades. But the rapid expansion of the cotton industry in the Deep South after the invention of the cotton gin, greatly increased demand for slave labor, and the Southern states continued as slave societies. They attempted to extend slavery into the new Western territories in order to keep their share of political power in the nation; Southern leaders dreamed of annexing Cuba to be used as a slave territory. The United States was polarized over the issue of slavery, represented by the slave and free states divided by the Mason–Dixon line, which separated free Pennsylvania from slave Maryland and Delaware.

Congress under Thomas Jefferson prohibited the importation of slaves, effective in 1808, but illegal smuggling took place. Domestic slave trading, however, continued at a rapid pace, driven by labor demands from the development of cotton plantations in the Deep South. More than one million slaves were sold from the Upper South, which had a surplus of labor, and taken to the Deep South in a forced migration, splitting up many families. New communities of African-American culture were developed in the Deep South, and the total slave population in the South eventually reached 4 million before liberation.

As the West was developed for settlement, the Southern states wanted to keep a balance between the number of slave and free states, in order to maintain a political balance of power in Congress. The new territories acquired from Britain, France, and Mexico were the subject of major political compromises. By 1850, the newly rich cotton-growing South was threatening to secede from the Union, and tensions continued to rise. With Southern church ministers having adapted to supporting slavery, as modified by Christian paternalism, the largest denominations, the Baptist, Methodist and Presbyterian churches split over the issue into regional organizations of the North and South. When Abraham Lincoln won the 1860 election on a platform of no new slave states, the South broke away to form the Confederacy; the first six states to secede held the greatest number of slaves in the South. This marked the start of the Civil War, which caused a huge disruption of the slave economy, with many slaves either escaping or being liberated by the Union armies. Due to Union measures such as the Confiscation Acts and Emancipation Proclamation in 1863, the war effectively ended slavery, even before ratification of the Thirteenth Amendment in December 1865 formally ended the legal institution throughout the United States.

== Other forms of unfree labor ==
Continued forms of involuntary servitude persisted after the Emancipation Proclamation and the adoption of the Thirteenth Amendment to the United States Constitution. This took place in various forms. The primary forms included convict leasing, peonage, and sharecropping, with the latter eventually encompassing poor whites as well and by the 1930s, they made up the vast majority.

=== Black Codes ===
The Black Codes were laws passed by Southern states in 1865 and 1866, after the Civil War. These laws had the intent and the effect of restricting African Americans' freedom, and of compelling them to work in a labor economy based on low wages or debt. Black Codes were part of a larger pattern of Southern whites trying to suppress the new freedom of emancipated African American slaves, the freedmen.

In the first two years after the Civil War, white dominated southern legislatures passed Black Codes modeled after the earlier slave codes. They were particularly concerned with controlling movement and labor, as slavery had given way to a free labor system. Although freedmen had been emancipated, their lives were greatly restricted by the black codes.

The term "Black Codes" was given by "negro leaders and the Republican organs", according to historian John S. Reynolds. The defining feature of the Black Codes was broad vagrancy law, which allowed local authorities to arrest freed people for minor infractions and commit them to involuntary labor.

==== Convict leasing ====
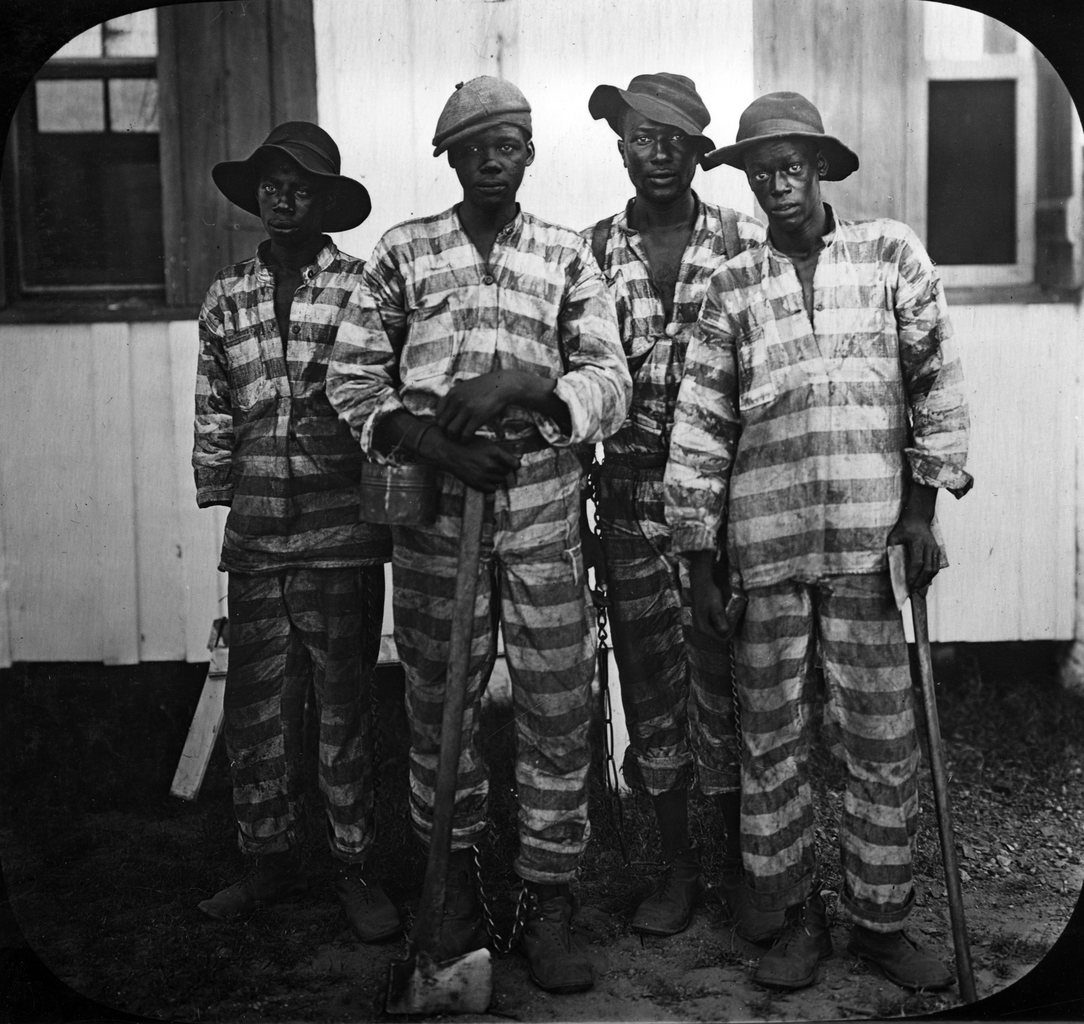
Convicts leased to harvest timber circa 1915, in Florida

With emancipation a legal reality, white Southerners were concerned with both controlling the newly freed slaves and keeping them in the labor force at the lowest level. The system of convict leasing began during Reconstruction and was fully implemented in the 1880s and officially ending in the last state, Alabama, in 1928. It persisted in various forms until it was abolished in 1942 by President Franklin D. Roosevelt during World War II, several months after the attack on Pearl Harbor involved the U.S. in the conflict. This system allowed private contractors to purchase the services of convicts from the state or local governments for a specific time period. African Americans, due to "vigorous and selective enforcement of laws and discriminatory sentencing", made up the vast majority of the convicts leased. Writer Douglas A. Blackmon writes of the system:

It was a form of bondage distinctly different from that of the antebellum South in that for most men, and the relatively few women drawn in, this slavery did not last a lifetime and did not automatically extend from one generation to the next. But it was nonetheless slavery – a system in which armies of free men, guilty of no crimes and entitled by law to freedom, were compelled to labor without compensation, were repeatedly bought and sold, and were forced to do the bidding of white masters through the regular application of extraordinary physical coercion.

The constitutional basis for convict leasing is that the Thirteenth Amendment, while abolishing slavery and involuntary servitude generally, expressly permits it as a punishment for crime.

==== Indentured Servitude and Vagrancy ====
Indentured servitude is a type of labor system that can be entered voluntarily or involuntarily. In Colonial America, European immigrants often got their right to passage through labor contracts, which were sold to landowners. Convicts who had been accused and convicted in Europe were forced overseas to work as indentured servants as punishment. The United States colonial government considered these workers chattel and allotted them very few civil rights. Colonial governments enacted laws that intended to protect masters rather than their servants. Certain practices trapped servants into legal agreements they could never break, restricting their personal freedom. On December 13, 1682, England’s Privy Council gave an order intended to prevent abuses in servant transportation. It put forth a condition that justices of the peace or mayors needed to be present to verify the signature of such contracts. Additionally, these documents did not protect workers from the act of spiriting, or the use of deception and misinformation about indentured servitude, within the procurement of European laborers. Under scrutiny, a servant could not successfully accuse any master or middleman of forced signature if an official had been present to document the transaction. This fact underscores the sheer power balance between master and servant and within the coercion that led servants to sign years of their life away.

The justice system often protected masters and middlemen who regulated the contractual process over servants themselves. The documentation of these abuses indicates the existence of unfree labor under indenture in the colonies, under the supervision of the authority figures trusted to protect these processes from abuse. In 1684, Justice of the Peace Abraham Bayly, along with his two colleagues, was charged with kidnapping two men to the colonies. Bayly, tasked with regulating the trafficking of indentured servants, acted as one of the many middlemen involved in this process. He only served a year and a half of his prison sentence before being pardoned for his crimes. This indicates the existence of forced immigration to the colonies as well as forced labor within them. The little documentation that has been collected concerning events like this leaves a lot of information out, and what exists forms a bleak image of the labor system. The available documentation proves that these contracts were unbreakable and bound servants to their word, regardless of how their minds changed after the signature.

Vagrants were individuals who claimed no occupation, failed to pay taxes, and did not claim a family. Individuals accused of vagrancy were forced into labor agreements by colonial governments. For instance, in 1755, the North Carolina General Assembly allowed colonial courts to assign vagrants to wage labor for a year. In response, Wake County court rounded up vagrants in preparation to prosecute them accordingly, and New Hanover County Court ordered accused unemployed men to find a job to do, or else they would be put to work. Bondage contracts were often the punishment for vagrancy, and even after an indenture period, under the regulation of vagrancy laws and the indentured servitude system, individuals faced constraints that made it an obligation to work. Under vagrancy laws, colonial governments had the freedom to arrest, restrain, and remove vagrants, as well as to transfer them to previous places of settlement, which could be their place of indenture.

Legislation relating to indentured servitude aided in the formation of labor contracts that restricted servants from marrying or traveling without a master’s permission. Runaways could be harshly punished for defying the agreements in their contracts. Female servants who bore children could face extensions to their contracts. For example, one servant, Hanah Davis, faced a four-year extension to her contract as a penalty for running away. There was often little deliberation in these trial proceedings, and such limitations created a restrictive lived experience for European immigrants.

=== Peonage ===
Peonage is a type of involuntary servitude. After the American Civil War of 1861–1865, peonage developed in the Southern United States. Poor white farmers and formerly enslaved African Americans known as freedmen who could not afford their own land would farm another person's land, exchanging labor for a share of the crops. This was called sharecropping and initially the benefits were mutual. The land owner would pay for the seeds and tools in exchange for a percentage of the money earned from the crop and a portion of the crop. As time passed, many landowners began to abuse this system. The landowner would force the tenant farmer or sharecropper to buy seeds and tools from the land owner’s store, which often had inflated prices. As sharecroppers were often illiterate, they had to depend on the books and accounting by the landowner and his staff. Other tactics included debiting expenses against the sharecropper's profits after the crop was harvested and "miscalculating" the net profit from the harvest, thereby keeping the sharecropper in perpetual debt to the landowner. Since the tenant farmers could not offset the costs, they were forced into involuntary labor due to the debts they owed the land owner.

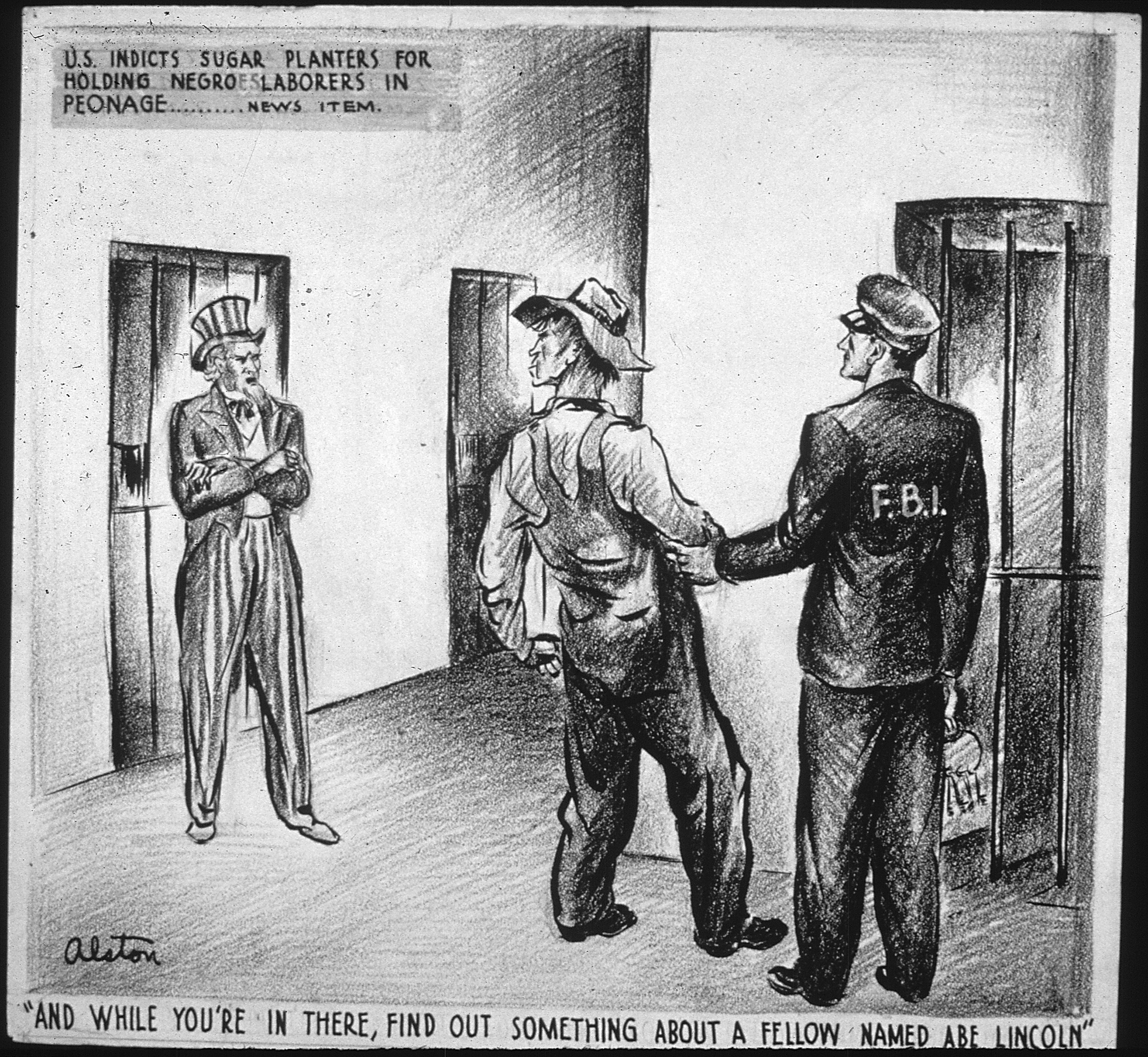
Cartoon of Indictment of US Planters and negro peonage

After the Civil War, the Thirteenth Amendment prohibited involuntary servitude such as peonage for all but convicted criminals. Congress also passed various laws to protect the constitutional rights of Southern blacks, making those who violated such rights by conspiracy, by trespass, or in disguise, guilty of an offence punishable by ten years in prison and civil disability. Unlawful use of state law to subvert rights under the Federal Constitution was made punishable by fine or a year's imprisonment. Until the involuntary servitude was abolished by president Lyndon B. Johnson in 1966, sharecroppers in Southern states were forced to continue working to pay off old debts or to pay taxes. Southern states allowed this in order to preserve sharecropping.

The following reported court cases involving peonage:

- 1903: South Dakota a 17-year-old girl was reported to have been sold into peonage at the age of two by her own father.
- 1904: Alabama ten persons Indicted for holding black and white persons in peonage.
- 1906: John W. Pace of Alabama-the "father" of Peonage; pardoned by his friend President Theodore Roosevelt.
- 1906: Five officials of Jackson Lumber Company received prison terms for peonage.
- 1916: Edward McCree of Georgia Legislature; owner of 37,000 acres of land; indicted on 13 charges; pleaded guilty to one charge and paid a $1,000 fine.
- 1916: Two men found guilty in Lexington County, South Carolina of trying to force a white man into peonage; each fined $500.00 and sentenced to a year and day in jail.
- 1921: Hawaiian Sugar Plantation owners try to legalize peonage of Chinese workers.
- 1921, Georgia, Williams Plantation Murders: Farmer John S. Williams and his black overseer, Clyde Manning, were convicted in the deaths of 11 blacks working as peons in Williams' farm. Williams was the first white person convicted of murder for killing a black person in Georgia since 1877. Manning died in prison in 1927. Williams was killed in an accident in prison in 1932.
- 1922: Convicted in 1921 for hopping a freight train without a ticket in Florida, Martin Tabert of North Dakota becomes part of State Convict leasing; he died Feb 1, 1922 for being whipped for being unable to work due to illness. Reports of his death lead to outlawing of convict leasing in Florida in 1923.

Because of the Spanish tradition, peonage was still widespread in New Mexico Territory after the American Civil War. Because New Mexico laws supported peonage, the US Congress passed an anti-peonage law on March 2, 1867 as follows: "Sec 1990. The holding of any person to service or labor under the system known as peonage is abolished and forever prohibited in the territory of New Mexico, or in any other territory or state of the United States; and all acts, laws, … made to establish, maintain, or enforce, directly or indirectly, the voluntary or involuntary service or labor of any persons as peons, in liquidation of any debt or obligation, or otherwise, are declared null and void." The current version of this statute is codified at Chapter 21-I of 42 U.S.C. § 1994 and makes no specific mention of New Mexico.

With the Peonage Act of 1867, Congress abolished "the holding of any person to service or labor under the system known as peonage", specifically banning "the voluntary or involuntary service or labor of any persons as peons, in liquidation of any debt or obligation, or otherwise."

In 1939, the Department of Justice created the Civil Rights Section, which focused primarily on First Amendment and labor rights. The increasing scrutiny of totalitarianism in the lead-up to World War II brought increased attention to issues of slavery and involuntary servitude, abroad and at home. The U.S. sought to counter foreign propaganda and increase its credibility on the race issue by combatting the Southern peonage system. Under the leadership of Attorney General Francis Biddle, the Civil Rights Section invoked the constitutional amendments and legislation of the Reconstruction Era as the basis for its actions.

In 1947, the DOJ successfully prosecuted Elizabeth Ingalls for keeping domestic servant Dora L. Jones in conditions of slavery. The court found that Jones "was a person wholly subject to the will of defendant; that she was one who had no freedom of action and whose person and services were wholly under the control of defendant and who was in a state of enforced compulsory service to the defendant." The Thirteenth Amendment enjoyed a swell of attention during this period, but from Brown v. Board (1954) until Jones v. Alfred H. Mayer Co. (1968) it was again eclipsed by the Fourteenth Amendment.

=== Truck system ===
A truck system, in the specific sense in which the term is used by labor historians, refers to an unpopular or even exploitative form of payment associated with small, isolated and/or rural communities, in which workers or self-employed small producers are paid in either: goods, a form of payment known as truck wages, or; tokens, private currency or direct credit, to be used at a company store, owned by their employers. A specific kind of truck system, in which credit advances are made against future work is known as debt bondage.

Under this system, workers were not paid cash; rather they were paid with non-transferable credit vouchers which could be exchanged only for goods sold at the company store. This made it impossible for workers to store up cash savings. Workers also usually lived in company-owned dormitories or houses, the rent for which was automatically deducted from their pay. In the United States the truck system and associated debt bondage persisted until the strikes of the newly formed United Mine Workers and affiliated unions forced an end to such practices.

Institutional Slavery

Institutional slavery is a form of slavery that diverges from the conventional understanding of slavery as it is perceived in the United States. Unlike traditional slavery, which typically involves a designated "master" or "mistress" who owns an individual, institutional slavery is characterized by the involvement of organizations, such as churches or educational institutions. In Virginia, this particular form of slavery was prevalent from approximately 1680 to 1860, with specific institutions including churches, schools, and colleges playing a significant role.

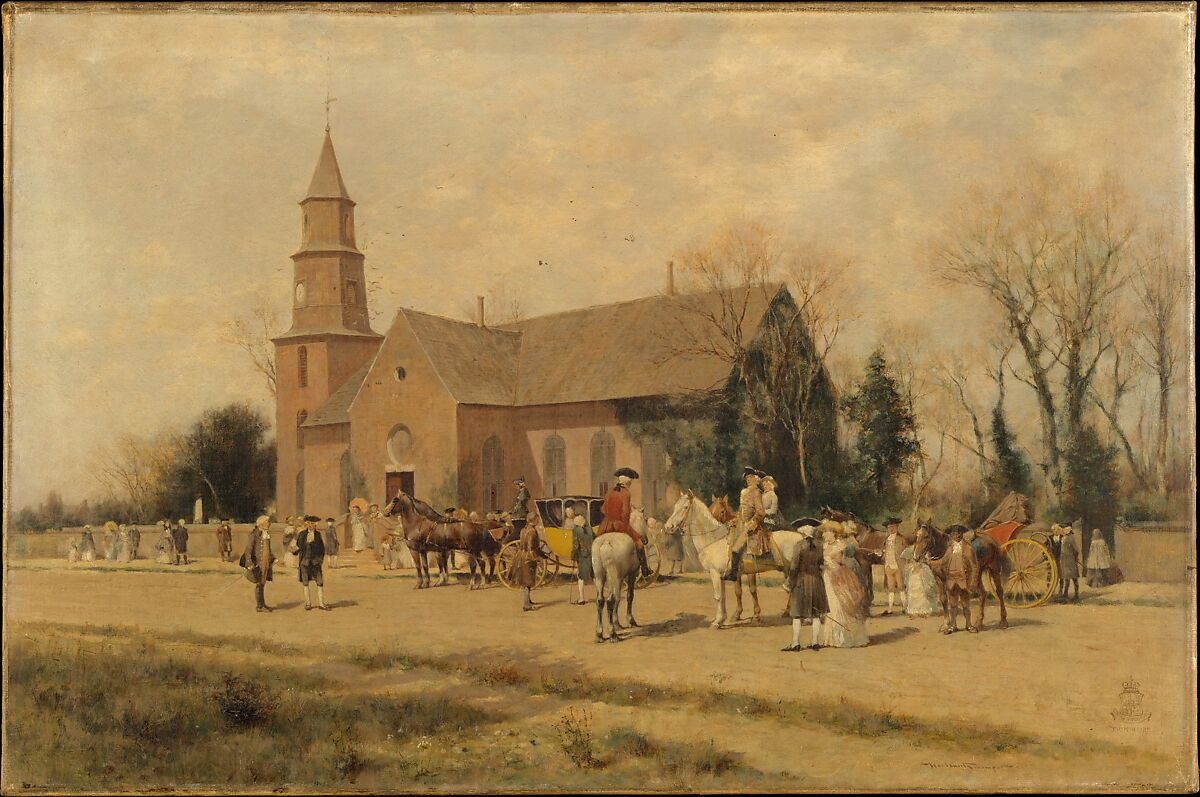
One of the churches that owned slaves while recognizing them as members of the congregation.

One of the institutions that practiced this form of slavery were churches. Jennifer Oasts' book "Institutional Slavery: Slaveholding Churches, Schools, Colleges, and Businesses in Virginia, 1680–1860" claims "As slave ownership became more common among Virginians, pious Anglicans began to donate slaves to their parish, often in their wills. For centuries, faithful members of the Church of England had given gifts to their parish church, such as silver for the communion service or alms for the poor" This indicates that Anglican parishes in Virginia were among the earliest organizations to possess enslaved individuals, initially acquiring them through donations and subsequently through intentional purchases. These churches utilized enslaved people in various capacities, such as managing glebe lands, property owned by the church to support its clergy, and generating revenue to assist the impoverished.

Laborers enslaved by the church often encountered distinct challenges. Some church leaders even encouraged enslaved people owned by the church to have children so the church would continue to have a supply of enslaved labor. Those enslaved by the church often encountered distinct challenges, including uncertainty regarding their ownership, a lack of individual representation for their welfare, and being regarded as communal assets rather than personal investments.

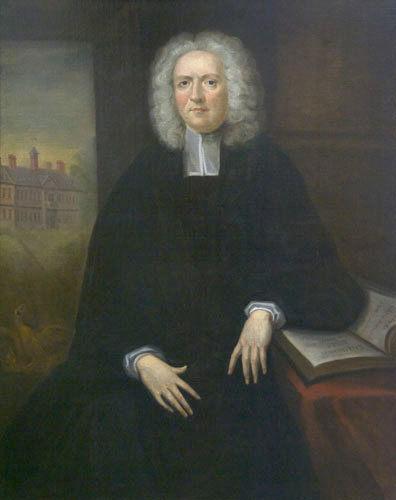
James Blair, founder of the College of William & Mary.

Schools and colleges were significant owners of enslaved individuals for labor in Virginia. The College of William & Mary, in particular, both owned and employed enslaved people who resided and worked on its campus. These individuals often endured exploitation and, at times, violence from students who sought to assert their social superiority. Enslaved individuals undertook vital responsibilities such as cleaning, maintaining the grounds, cooking, providing care for students, and running errands. They were regarded not only as laborers but also as financial assets, with their labor contributing to the funding of student scholarships.

Enslaved individuals encountered numerous challenges at the College of William & Mary, including frequent violence perpetrated by both students and faculty. Many students, hailing from families that owned slaves, regarded these individuals as inferior and subjected them to harsh treatment. Historical records reveal occurrences of physical abuse. Enslaved workers were often caught between the conflicting demands of faculty and students. Although faculty held formal authority, student, many of whom were asserting their own dominance, also imposed control, resulting in confusion and heightened stress for the enslaved individuals.

Despite the numerous challenges they faced, enslaved individuals at the college experienced familial bonds and managed to preserve elements of their African heritage and discovered some economic opportunities during their scarce free time. Archaeological excavations have revealed artifacts that reflect the presence and cultural practices of enslaved African Americans at the institution.

== Sexual slavery ==
=== Under chattel slavery ===
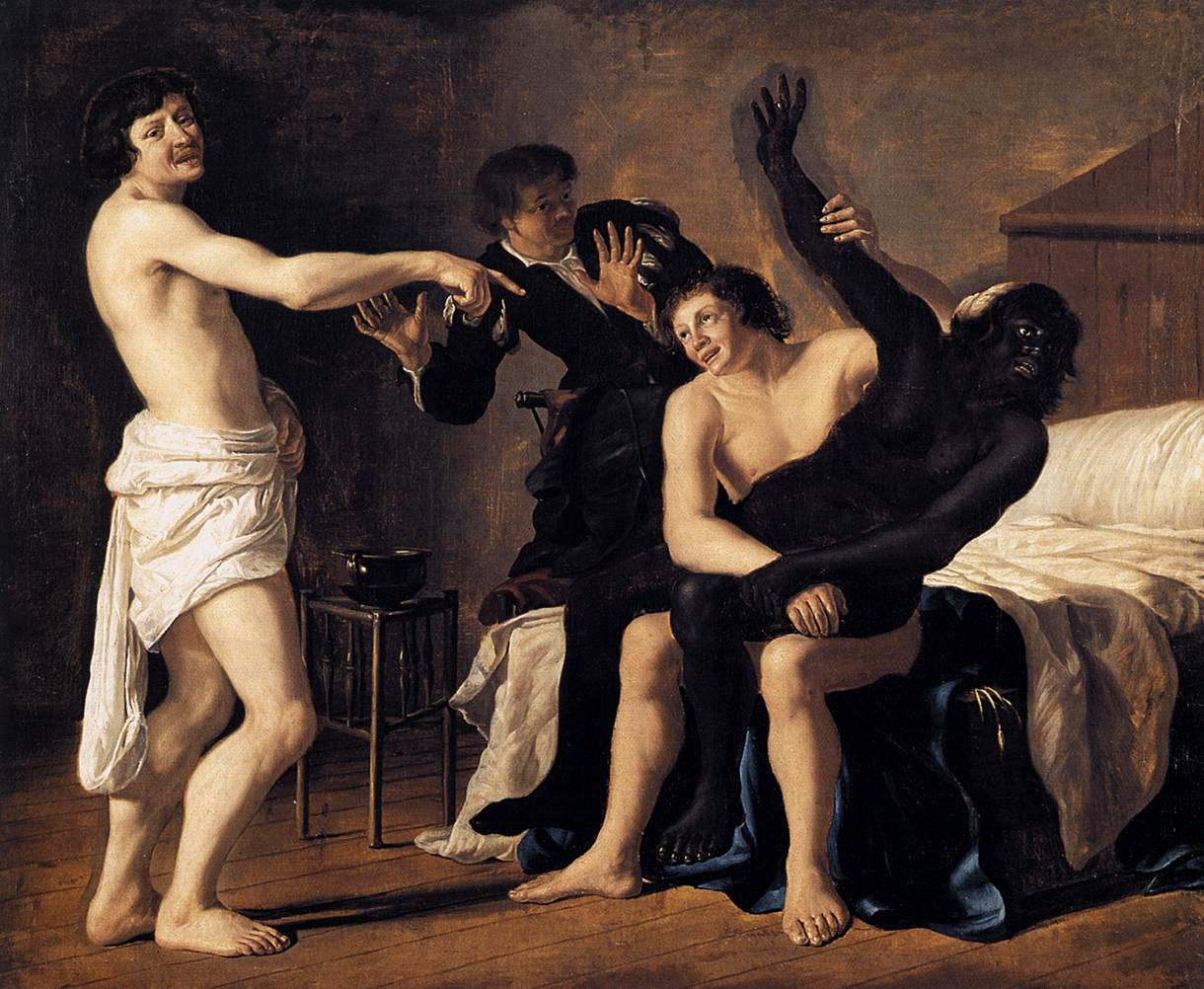
Three Young White Men and a Black Woman (1632) by Christiaen van Couwenbergh.

From the beginning of African slavery in the North American colonies, slaves were often viewed as property, rather than people. Slave women were often raped by white overseers, planter's younger sons before they married, and other white men associated with the slaveholders. Some were sold into brothels outright. Plaçage, a formalized system of concubinage among slave women or free people of color, developed in Louisiana and particularly New Orleans by the 18th century.

Slave breeding was the attempt by a slave-owner to influence the reproduction of his slaves for profit. It included forced sexual relations between male and female slaves, encouraging slave pregnancies, sexual relations between master and slave to produce slave children and favoring female slaves who had many children. The historian E. Franklin Frazier, in his book The Negro Family, stated that "there were masters who, without any regard for the preferences of their slaves, mated their human chattel as they did their stock". Ex-slave Maggie Stenhouse remarked, "Durin' slavery there were stockmen. They was weighed and tested. A man would rent the stockman and put him in a room with some young women he wanted to raise children from."

Many female slaves (known as "fancy maids") were sold at auction into concubinage or prostitution, which was called the "fancy trade". Concubine slaves were the only female slaves who commanded a higher price than skilled male slaves.

=== In Louisiana ===
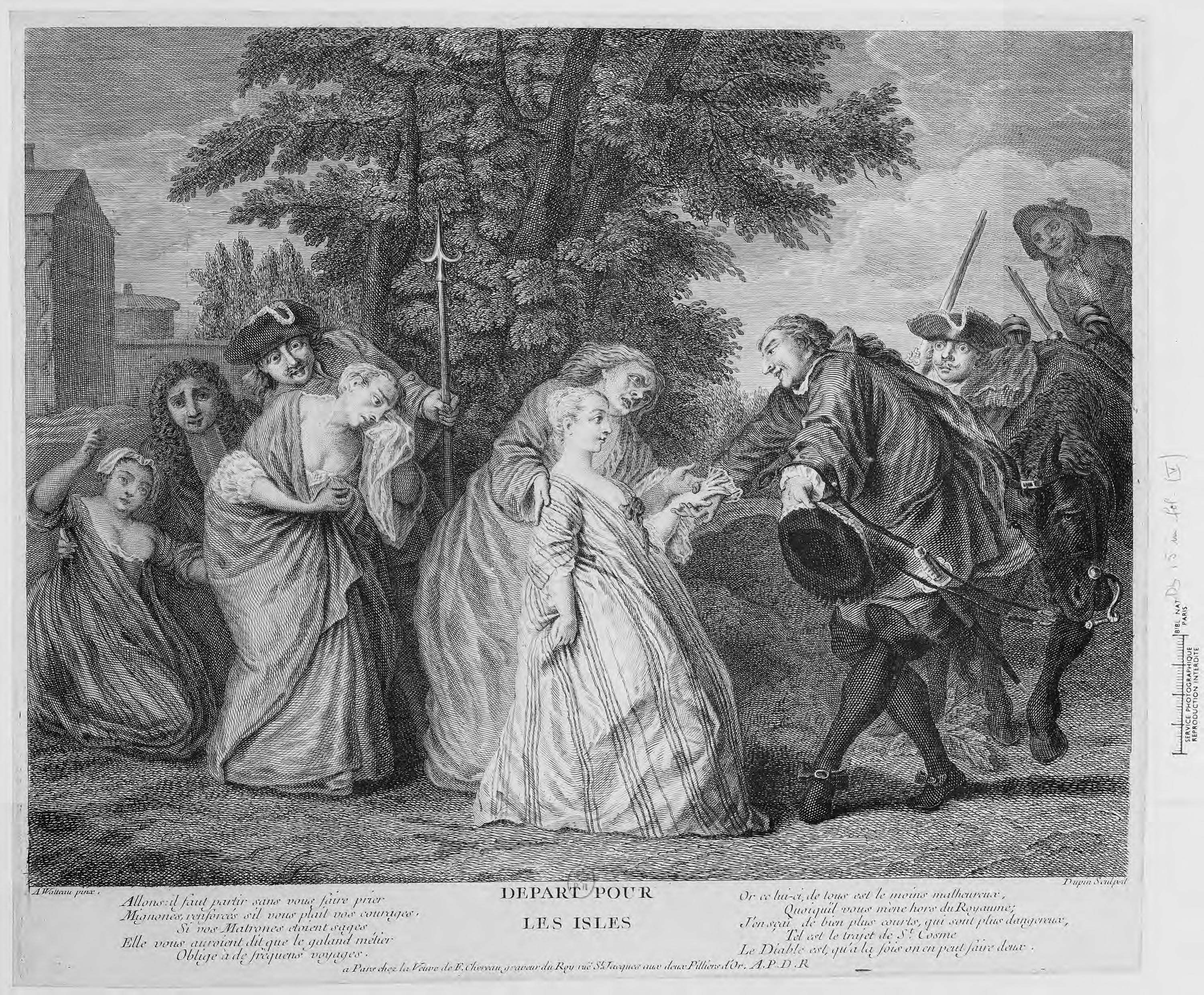
A print depicting 'comfort women' embarking unwillingly for the Americas

The plaçage system developed from the predominance of men among early colonial populations, who took women as consorts from Native Americans and enslaved Africans. In this period there was a shortage of European women, as the colonies were dominated in the early day by male explorers and colonists. Given the harsh conditions in Louisiana, persuading women to follow the men was not easy. France sent females convicted along with their debtor husbands, and in 1719, deported 209 women felons "who were of a character to be sent to the French settlement in Louisiana". France also relocated young women orphans known as King's Daughters (French: filles du roi) to their colonies for marriage: to both Canada and Louisiana.

Through warfare and raids, Native American women were often captured to be traded, sold, or taken as wives. At first, the colony generally imported male Africans to use as slave labor because of the heavy work of clearing to develop plantations. Over time, it also imported African female slaves. Marriage between the races was forbidden according to the Code Noir of the eighteenth century, but interracial sex continued. The upper class European men during this period often did not marry until their late twenties or early thirties. Premarital sex with an intended white bride, especially if she was of high rank, was not permitted socially.

White male colonists, often the younger sons of noblemen, military men, and planters, who needed to accumulate some wealth before they could marry, took women of color as consorts before marriage. Merchants and administrators also followed this practice if they were wealthy enough. A white man might rape a slave as young as twelve.

=== Post-emancipation ===
After slaves were emancipated, many states passed anti-miscegenation laws, which prohibited interracial marriage between whites and non-whites. But this did not stop white men from taking sexual advantage of black women by using their social positions of power under the Jim Crow system and white supremacy, or in other parts of the country by ordinary power and wealth dynamics.

During the California Gold Rush in the late 1840s, Chinese merchants transported thousands of young Chinese girls, including babies, from China to the United States and sold them into sexual slavery within the red light district of San Francisco. Girls could be bought for as little as $40 (about $1104 in 2013 dollars) in Guangzhou, and sold for $400 (about $11,040 in 2013 dollars) in the United States. Many of these girls were forced into opium addiction and lived their entire lives as prostitutes.

A few captives from Native American tribes who were used as slaves were not freed when African-American slaves were emancipated. "Ute Woman", a Ute captured by the Arapaho and later sold to a Cheyenne, was one example. Used as a prostitute for sale to American soldiers at Cantonment in the Indian Territory, she lived in slavery until about 1880 when she died of a hemorrhage resulting from "excessive sexual intercourse".

=== White slavery ===
Ad warning about white slavery

By the 19th century, most of America's cities had a designated, legally protected area of prostitution. Increased urbanization and young women entering the workforce led to greater flexibility in courtship without supervision. It is in this changing social sphere that the panic over "white slavery" began. This term referred to women being kidnapped for the purposes of prostitution.

Numerous communities appointed vice commissions to investigate the extent of local prostitution, whether prostitutes participated in it willingly or were forced into it and the degree to which it was organized by any cartel-type organizations. The second significant action at the local levels was to close the brothels and the red light districts. From 1910 to 1913, city after city withdrew this tolerance and forced the closing of their brothels. Opposition to openly practiced prostitution had been growing steadily throughout the last decades of the 19th century. The federal government's response to the moral panic was the Mann Act. The purpose of the act was to make it a crime to coerce transportation of unwilling women. The statute made it a crime to "transport or cause to be transported, or aid to assist in obtaining transportation for" or to "persuade, induce, entice or coerce" a woman to travel.

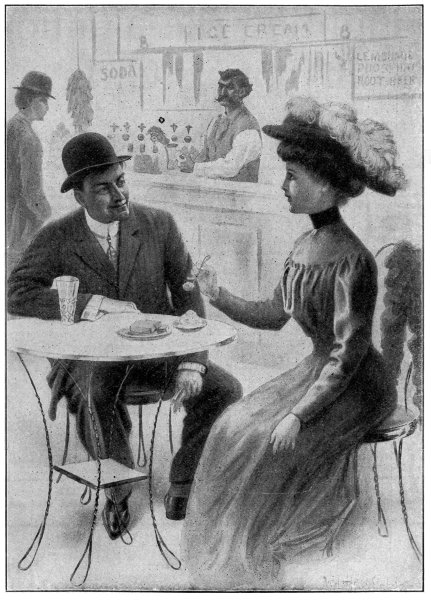
Ad warning about the use of ice cream parlors to traffic women

According to historian Mark Thomas Connelly, "a group of books and pamphlets appeared announcing a startling claim: a pervasive and depraved conspiracy was at large in the land, brutally trapping and seducing American girls into lives of enforced prostitution, or 'white slavery'. These white slave narratives, or white-slave tracts, began to circulate around 1909." Such narratives often portrayed innocent girls "victimized by a huge, secret and powerful conspiracy controlled by foreigners", as they were drugged or imprisoned and forced into prostitution.

This excerpt from The War on the White Slave Trade was written by the United States District Attorney in Chicago:

One thing should be made very clear to the girl who comes up to the city, and that is that the ordinary ice cream parlor is very likely to be a spider's web for her entanglement. This is perhaps especially true of those ice cream saloons and fruit stores kept by foreigners. Scores of cases are on record where young girls have taken their first step towards "white slavery" in places of this character.

Suffrage activists, especially Harriet Burton Laidlaw and Rose Livingston, worked in New York City's Chinatown and in other cities to rescue young white and Chinese girls from forced prostitution, and helped pass the Mann Act to make interstate sex trafficking a federal crime. Livingston publicly discussed her past as a prostitute and claimed to have been abducted and developed a drug problem as a sex slave in a Chinese man's home, narrowly escaped and experienced a Christian conversion narrative. Other groups like the Woman's Christian Temperance Union and Hull House focused on children of prostitutes and poverty in community life while trying to pass protective legislation. The American Purity Alliance also supported the Mann Act.

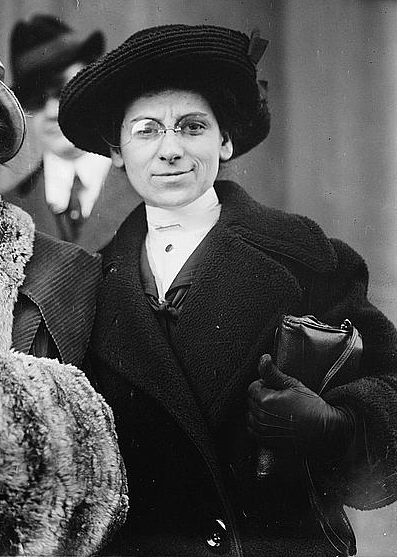
Rose Livingston, known as the Angel of Chinatown, worked to free slaves in New York City

In 1910, the US Congress passed the White Slave Traffic Act of 1910 (better known as the Mann Act), which made it a felony to transport women across state borders for the purpose of "prostitution or debauchery, or for any other immoral purpose". Its primary stated intent was to address prostitution, immorality, and human trafficking particularly where it was trafficking for the purposes of prostitution, but the ambiguity of "immoral purpose" effectively criminalized interracial marriage and banned single women from crossing state borders for morally wrong acts. As more women were being trafficked from foreign countries, the US began passing immigration acts to curtail aliens from entering the country. Several acts such as the Emergency Quota Act of 1921 and Immigration Act of 1924 were passed to prevent emigrants from Europe and Asia from entering the United States. Following the banning of immigrants during the 1920s, human trafficking was not considered a major issue until the 1990s.

The 1921 Convention set new goals for international efforts to stem human trafficking, primarily by giving the anti-trafficking movement further official recognition, as well as a bureaucratic apparatus to research and fight the problem. The Advisory Committee on the Traffic of Women and Children was a permanent advisory committee of the League. Its members were nine countries, and several non-governmental organizations. An important development was the implementation of a system of annual reports of member countries. Member countries formed their own centralized offices to track and report on trafficking of women and children. The advisory committee also worked to expand its research and intervention program beyond the United States and Europe. In 1929, a need to expand into the Near East (Asia Minor), the Middle East and Asia was acknowledged. An international conference of central authorities in Asia was planned for 1937, but no further action was taken during the late 1930s.

== Labor trafficking ==
According to the National Human Rights Center in Berkeley, California, there are currently about 10,000 forced laborers in the U.S., around one-third of whom are domestic servants and some portion of whom are children. In reality, this number could be far higher due to the difficulty in getting exact numbers of victims, due to the secretive nature of human trafficking. The U.S. government only keeps a count of survivors, defined as victims of severe instances of human trafficking, who have been assisted by the government in acquiring immigration benefits. Research at San Diego State University estimates that there are 2.4 million victims of human trafficking among illegal Mexican immigrants. On the other hand, it could be far lower—and possibly approach zero—since there are virtually no arrests for this. Research by the Urban Institute says that law enforcement agencies do not prioritize labor trafficking cases, were reluctant to help victims obtain authorization to legally remain in the United States, and felt there was not enough evidence to corroborate victim statements.

In 2014, the National Human Trafficking Resource Center reported 990 cases of forced labor trafficking in the US, including 172 which also involved sex trafficking. The US Department of State stated that there are around 50,000 persons trafficked into the United States every year. The most common types of labor trafficking included domestic work, traveling sales crews, agriculture/farms, restaurant/food service, health and beauty services, begging, retail, landscaping, hospitality, construction, carnivals, elder care, forestry, manufacturing, and housekeeping. Women and Children are more widely affected by trafficking. Typically traffickers manipulate those "who are disproportionately affected by poverty, the lack of access to education, chronic unemployment, discrimination, and the lack of economic opportunities." Victims of trafficking are often raped, beaten, starved and put in many life-threatening circumstances. This includes exposure to diseases, violent criminal activity and unethical labor.

== See also ==
- Convict lease
- Indentured servitude in British America
- Labor history of the United States
- History of labor law in the United States
- Human trafficking in the United States
- Sharecropping in the United States
