= Rose Livingston =

American suffragette

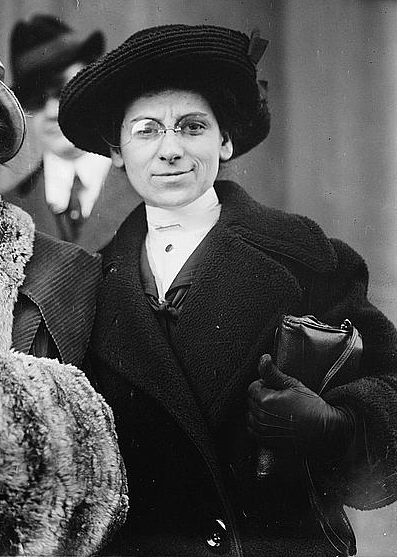
- Rose Livingston in 1913
- Born: 1876 (Note: Her estimated year of birth is based upon her dying at age 99 on December 26, 1975. A friend claimed she was born on Christmas Day (December 25). The 1930 census (enumerated on April 5, 1930) gives her age, as of her last birthday, as 50; this would indicate 1879 as her year of birth. Another source, The Salt Lake Telegram, gave her age on January 28, 1917 as 35, indicating 1881 or 1882 as her year of birth.); New York (state) (Note: Other sources indicated she had been born in Hamilton, Ohio or Fort Worth, Texas.)
- Died: December 26, 1975 (aged 99); New York, New York, U.S.
- Other name: Angel of Chinatown
- Occupations: Activist, suffragette
- Known for: Rescuing victims of sexual slavery

Rose Livingston (1876 – December 26, 1975), known as the Angel of Chinatown, was a suffragist who worked to free prostitutes and victims of sexual slavery. With financial and social support from Harriet Burton Laidlaw and other noted suffragettes, as well as the Rose Livingston Prudential Committee, she worked in New York City's Chinatown and in other cities to rescue girls from forced prostitution, and helped pass the Mann Act to make interstate sex trafficking a federal crime.

Livingston initially thought that she wanted to work overseas as a missionary. She realized, though, that there was much good that she could do in New York. She referred to herself as a missionary and worked nights looking for pre-teen and teenage girls who were forced into sexual slavery. A small and thin woman, she was beaten and shot, sometimes spending months in the hospital recovering from her injuries. Once she rescued girls, she helped them transition into a life of freedom. She lectured about the dangers of children and young women being forced into sex work. She also advocated for women's right to vote.

== Early life ==
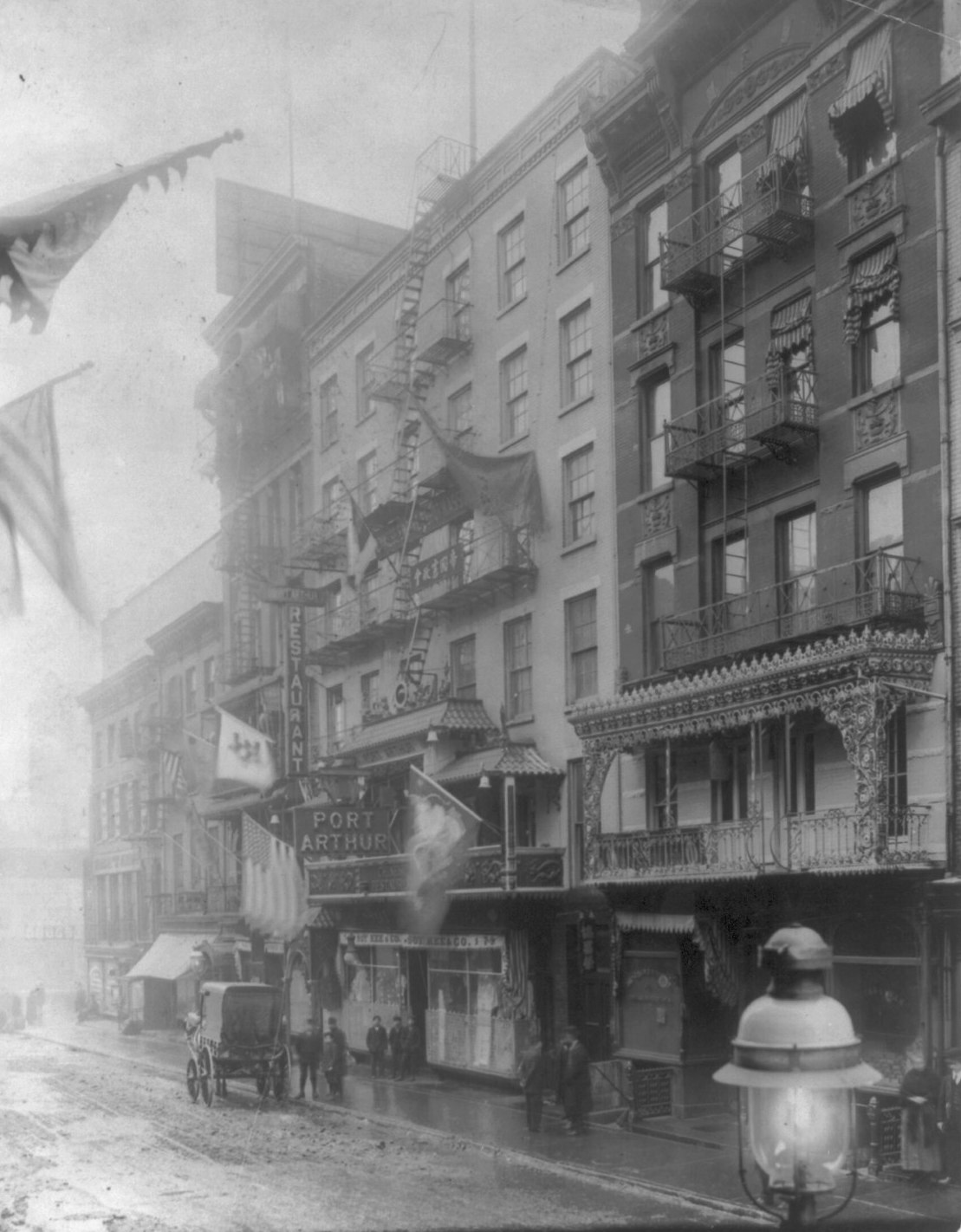
New York City, January 21, 1909: Chinatown decorated for the Chinese New Year

Rose Livingston was born in New York State most likely in 1876.

Her parents were also born in New York State. Livingston was reportedly raised in Ohio and Texas in the Methodist faith. Livingston came to New York City at age 12. (Note: In AsiaTown Cleveland: From Tong Wars to Dim Sum, Alan F. Dutka states that Livingston was abducted at the age of ten and was forced into prostitution in New York's Chinatown, where she was said to have developed an opium addiction. She allegedly bore two children to her captors, one when she was 12 and the second at 15. Dutka states that she was rescued in 1903. There do not appear to be any other sources that support Dutka's account of Livingston's childhood. For instance, another account of her childhood and adult life does not mention Livingston having ever been abducted.)

Livingston was initially interested in becoming a foreign missionary, but decided she could be an independent missionary in New York City after she saw a drug-crazed girl being rescued.

== Life's work ==
Initially, about 1903, Livingston worked at Sunshine Settlement, a settlement house on Baxter and at 106 Bayard Street in New York City. Established in 1900, Sunshine Settlement helped mothers and poor children by providing health services, education, and "healthful" visits to the seaside beaches. Gospel services and lectures were performed there. It offered a kindergarten, sewing school, and a library. Clients could request medical and legal advice. It operated through ca. 1911.

=== Activist ===
==== Background ====
Girls and women became sexual slaves by being physically kidnapped, drugged, or unknowingly lured into the industry with a promise of a job or an adventure. In 1934, the New York City police department statistics showed that 4,000 females disappeared from that city each year, and many more disappeared without being reported missing. Their captors often got the girls addicted to drugs to better contain and control them. Ultimately, some girls were rescued and did well, some were rescued but were so broken they had to be institutionalized, some died early, and others remained as captive sex workers.

Many girls that Livingston rescued said something like, "I met him and he was nice to me. Then he invited me to go for a ride." Then the girls were handed off to another person who would drug, poison, beat, or otherwise mistreat them. Girls were often transported across state lines. Livingston found that there was an auction on the Lower East Side of New York where girls and women were sold.

==== Rescues ====
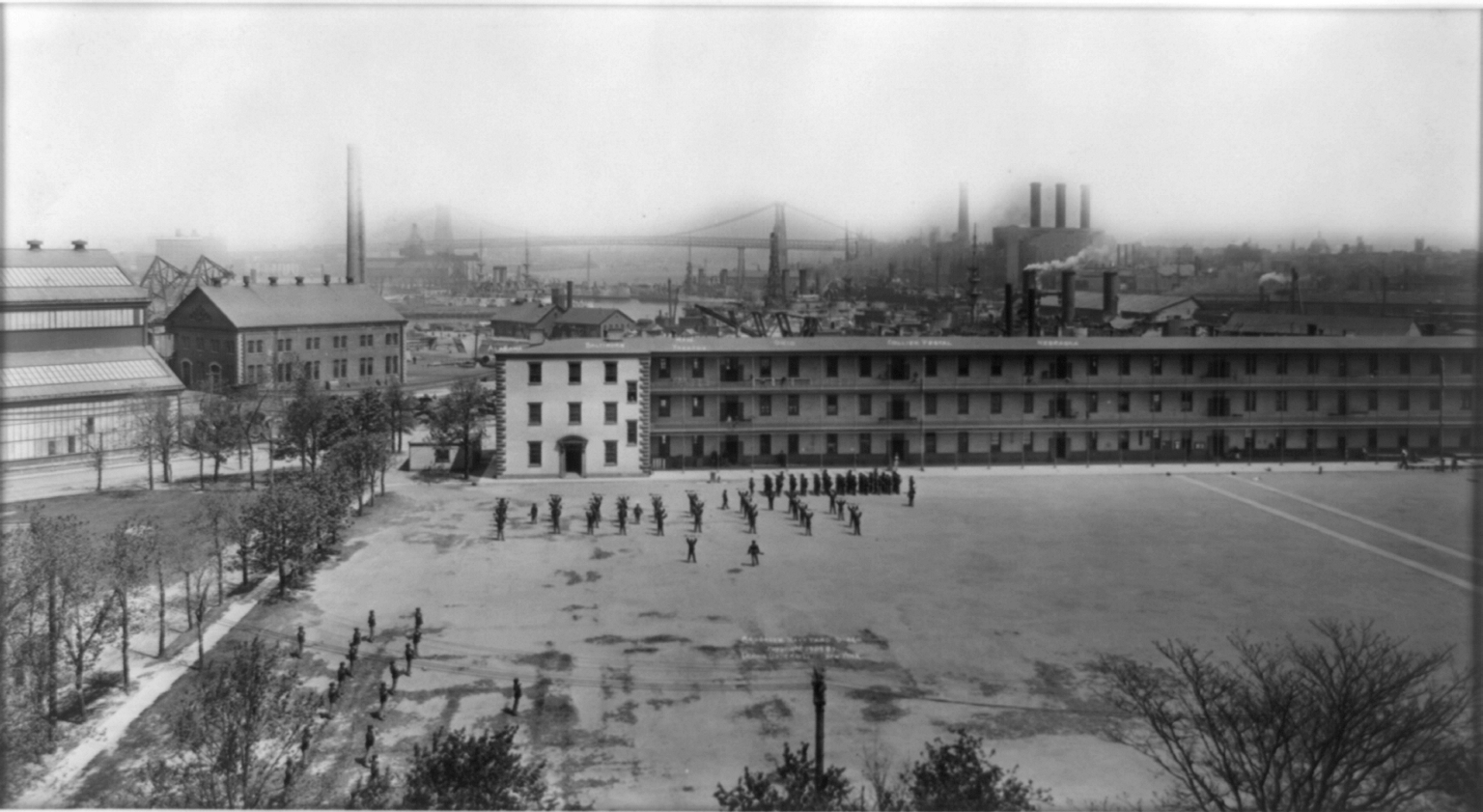
Brooklyn Navy Yards barracks, 1909

Focusing on girls who were between nine and seventeen years of age, Livingston made it her life's work to free thousands of girls and women from sexual slavery beginning on March 4, 1903 or about 1904.

Her modus operandi was to follow men that were sexual slavers, figure out what females were held captive, make friends with them, and encourage them to escape. She looked for enslaved girls in opium dens, dance halls, and bars, particularly in New York City's Chinatown and the Brooklyn Navy Yard. Sometimes she ventured out of the city to Boston, Newark, Bridgeport, New Haven, and Chicago. In 1907, there were 300 girls younger than 18 in Chinatown that were sex workers, out of a total of 800 white slaves. Six years later, she could not find any girls under age 18 there.

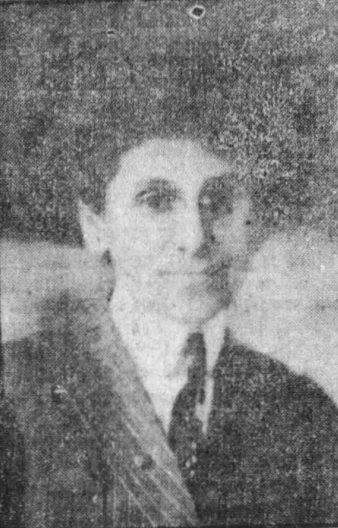
Miss Rose Livingston, dressed as a man, 1914

External image
- Image of Livingston dressed and coifed like a man, 1934

She was described as having a masculine-looking face and she wore short hair and men's clothing, which allowed her to blend in at dance calls and other night spots when she went in search of girls to rescue.

Once freed, she offered the girls and young women rehabilitation and ministered to them in accordance with her Christian faith. Called the "Angel of Chinatown", she considered herself a missionary and an independent social worker. She saved an eight-year-old girl who had been kidnapped and taken to Philadelphia, after being asked by her father to find his daughter. There were times when bravery and quick thinking helped her rescue girls, like the time that she saved a girl who was being kidnapped by three men. She motioned that she had a gun in her pocket and waited for the police, who arrested the men. She went on high-speed chases in taxis to save girls. When she rescued girls, she took them to her apartment, rather than the police or the children's society, and contacted the girls' families. She was aware of the fact that it was a difficult process to transition back into a family, so she did not believe in rushing girls back to their parents' homes. Livingston described her brand of missionary work:

I don't go in to visit these girls and give them a tract and say 'God bless you', and invite them around to take tea with me. That's not my kind of work. There are some girls that it might [be] hard to help, but there are some little, fresh young things that have just been brought to Chinatown, and that you can sometimes reach in time to save them. Sometimes you can get there before the harm is done.

— Rose Livingston, speaking at the Metropolitan Temple, 1912

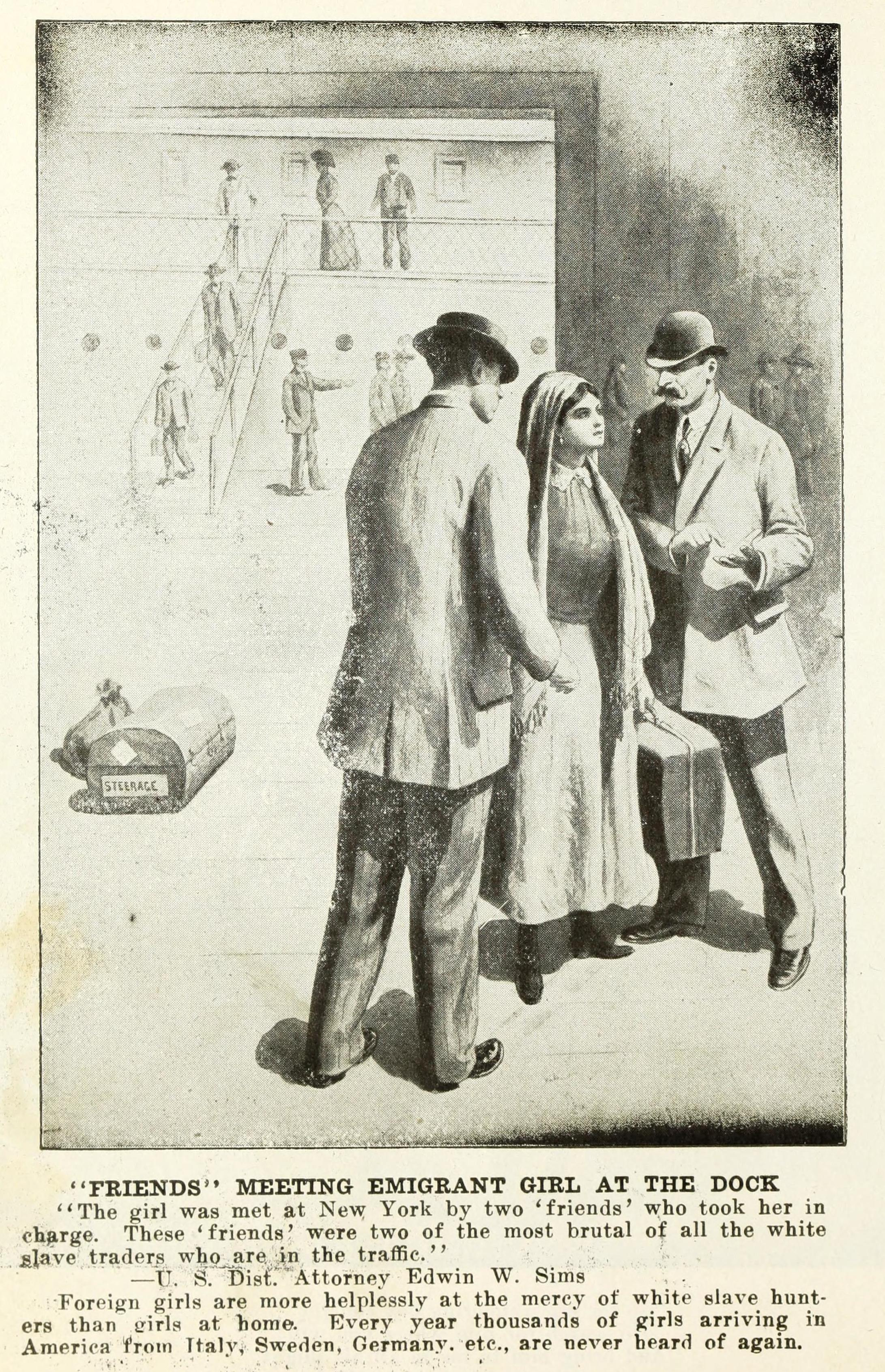
Fighting the Traffic in Young Girls, "a book designed to awaken the sleeping and to protect the innocent", according to its title page.

By 1934, with over 30 years of experience, the number of young women Livingston had reportedly rescued varied: 800, 4,000, or 5,000 girls or young women. Of the girls that she rescued, only two returned to life as a sex worker. If the girl had a baby, in her experience, not one of the girls' families took the baby into the family. Many of the girls she rescued looked on her as a mother, and brought potential husbands to her for approval. The League of Nations identified her as a noted figure in the fight against sexual slavery around the world. She found that there was a world-wide network of trafficking sexual slaves. In a report by the League,

Miss Livingston sets forth the diabolical tactics of white slave rings in this country as she has seen them. She suggests a remedy and sounds a warning to mothers and fathers.

— League of Nations

She offered solutions to the sexual slavery problem, particularly regarding girls and young women. She asked all women to be more understanding of children, so that they did not want to run away from home. She suggested that cities hire plain-clothed police women to patrol vice-ridden districts to prevent girls from being led into slavery. She asked parents to talk to their daughters about the danger of being taken, without terrorizing them. Livingston stated that she believed that this would dramatically reduce the likelihood of girls being kidnapped by avoiding the first false, reckless step—like getting into the car of a stranger.

==== Financial support ====
Before the Rose Livingston Committee was established, she received support from Miss Elizabeth Voss, whose father had been the city's District Attorney. The Committee of Fourteen women from Brooklyn supported her. At some point a church in Brooklyn, New York provided for her maintenance. About 1911, she became affiliated with suffragettes who offered her support. A few women met her when she was trying to save a girl from killing herself. They introduced Livingston to Harriet Burton Laidlaw whose husband, James Laidlaw, created the Committee of Three with Rev. M. Sanderson and Lawrence Chamberlain.

In the late 1920s or early 1930, her work was sponsored by the Rose Livingston Committee, also called the Rose Livingston Prudential Committee, who paid her $600 (~$11,564 in 2025) a year. She used part of her salary to pay for clothes and food for the girls she rescued. The members of the committee included women, several ministers, and a former assistant district attorney. Livingston was supported, financially and socially, by Harriet Burton Laidlaw, as well as other noted suffragettes across the country, and James Lees Laidlaw. She lectured across the country about the prevalence of white slavery. The Rose Livingston Committee issued an annual report of the freed girls and convicted people who were the slaveholders.

==== Danger ====
As she rescued women, she put herself in danger. About five feet tall and weighing about 90 pounds, she faced male procurers, or cadets, as she tried to rescue girls and women. She was severely beaten, shot, wounded, and thrown out windows. In 1912, she was severely beaten, resulting in permanent damage. She had severe neuritis and persistent neuralgic pain due to a fracture of the alveolar process of the upper jaw bone. On one side of her face, she lost all of the teeth of the upper jaw. (Note: After hearing of the attack against Livingston, New Yorkers petitioned William Jay Gaynor, the mayor, to ensure that reform workers and women missionaries were given more police protection in Chinatown. The police commissioner stated that the area was safer than ever and the mayor followed that with the advice that if she does not want to be in danger there, Livingston should not visit Chinatown. Livingston and her supporters saw Gaynor as being antagonistic to her anti-prostitution campaign.)

In 1914, a contract was taken out on her life for $500 (equivalent to $16,070 in 2025). Once, a few years before 1934, she was hurt so badly trying to save a girl from Boston that she was in the hospital for five months and on crutches for two years. She was pushed from a roof of the red-light district in Brooklyn. By 1933, she had 22 beatings, one of which caused severe injury of her eyes. After a number of operations, her eyesight continued to fail her in the 1930s. She carried a gun with her, but was never known to have shot at anyone.

=== Mann Act ===
Before 1910, it was not illegal to engage in sex trafficking across state lines. Livingston helped pass the Mann Act, that made interstate sex trafficking a federal crime in 1910.

=== Awards ===
A week of testimonial dinners were conducted in 1927 to celebrate the 24 years that she helped girls attain freedom. In 1929, she was awarded a gold medal by the National Institute of Social Sciences, for her "unique work and indefatigable faithfulness for almost 30 years." In 1937 she was awarded a silver cup by Mrs. J. Sergeant Cram (Edith Claire Bryce) of the Peace House for her "deeds of courage without violence".

== Personal life ==
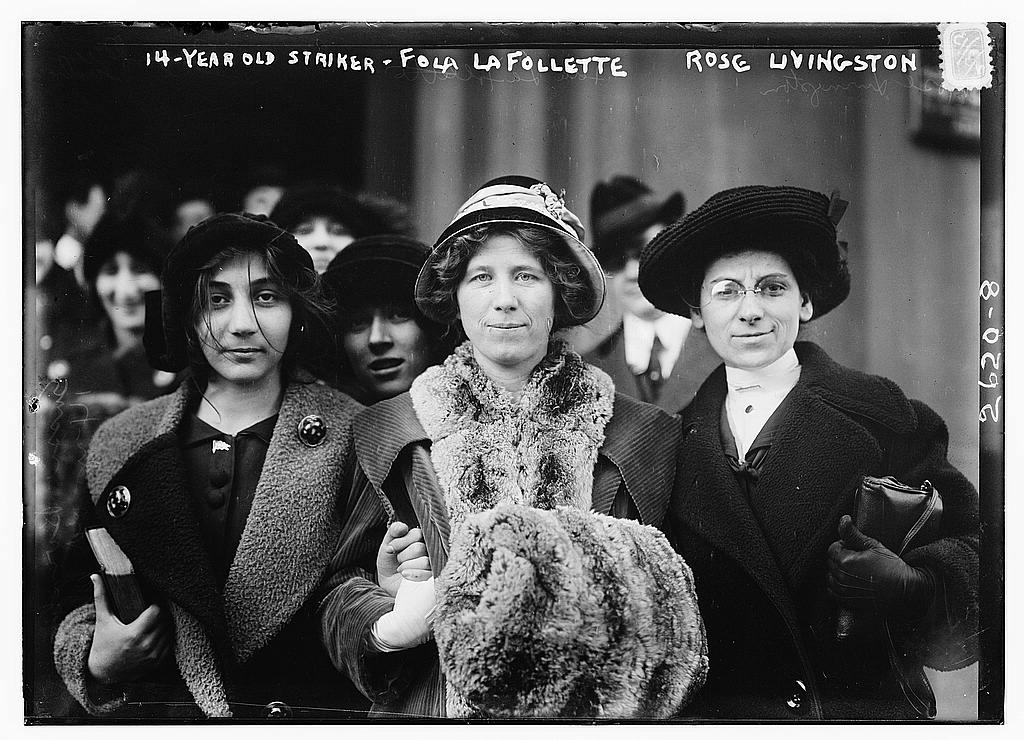
Unidentified 14-year-old striker, Fola La Follette and Rose Livingston in New York City in 1913

In 1914, she participated in one of the Suffrage Hikes from Manhattan to Albany, New York and over the years, she lectured about women's suffrage. In 1914, she conducted lectures throughout 40 counties of Ohio for the Ohio Woman Suffrage Association to explain to girls the dangers of being led into a life as a sexual worker.

In order to search for girls at night, Livingston slept during the day for about three hours. To protect her safety, only her best friends knew her address. She lived in cold water flats and had a very frugal lifestyle. For instance, she lived in a three-room flat on E. 49th Street in New York City for 46 years, beginning about 1929. It was near the East River. By 1928, she wore masculine clothing. In 1934, she was found living in poverty, and a retirement fund was established for her.

Although she read the Bible and a book on Christian Science, she did not attend church services unless she had agreed to speak at the church. She did not consider herself a Christian Scientist.

She was quoted as saying that she was still involved helping girls in 1950, but had retired around 1937 and received a pension of $100 per month. She was cared for by neighbors who helped her obtain a supplemental Social Security pension and did chores for her. She particularly needed help once she started to lose her sight. She died on December 26, 1975, believed to be 99 years old. (Note: According to her good friend, Mike Supple, Rose's birthday was Christmas Day. Supple also said the coroner mistakenly gave her age as 100, when she was actually 99.) A rabbi conducted a Jewish service for her, and her friend, Mike Supple, a Catholic, arranged for a Catholic funeral service in her memory.

== See also ==
- Somaly Mam, Cambodian anti-trafficking advocate who focuses primarily on sex trafficking
