= James Lees Laidlaw =

American banker, civic worker and philanthropist

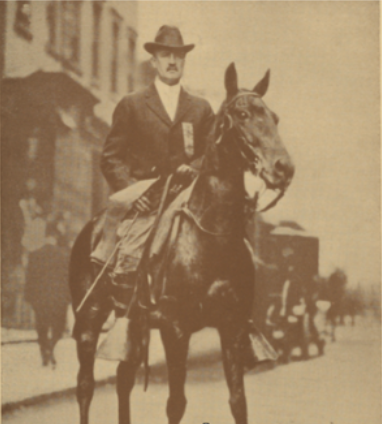
- James Lees Laidlaw, President of New York State Men's League for Women Suffrage, Parade
- Born: December 19, 1868; New York
- Died: May 9, 1932 (aged 63); Sands Point, New York
- Occupation: Banker
- Spouse: Harriet Burton Laidlaw
- Children: Louise Burton Laidlaw
- Parent(s): Elizabeth Onderdonk Laidlaw; Henry B. Laidlaw

James Lees Laidlaw (December 19, 1868 – May 9, 1932) was a banker, civic worker, and philanthropist. He supported the League of Nations and women's suffrage movement. He was president of the New York State Men's League for Women's Suffrage, which helped women obtain the right to vote on November 6, 1917, and he was a leader in the national men's organization. His was the only man's name that was placed on memorial tablets in Albany and Washington, D.C. in recognition of individual's efforts during the women's suffrage movement.

== Early life ==
The son of Elizabeth Carter Onderdonk Laidlaw and Henry Bell Laidlaw, James Lees Laidlaw was born on December 19, 1868, in Manhattan, New York. His ancestors date back to early 17th century settlers of Long Island and New York. His father founded the banking firm Laidlaw & Company before the Civil War.

He was the second child, after Louise, born to Elizabeth Carter Onderdonk and Henry Bell Laidlaw between 1865 and 1885. His siblings include Louise, who married William Herbert Judson; Edith Elizabeth, married Imlay L. Benet; Alice, married Jesse Lynch Williams; Jessie, married Edward Roesler; Agnes, married August Roesler; Robert, married Isabella Wood; and Elliot. (Note: Alive at the time of Laidlaw's death were Elliott, Alice, Jessie, and Mrs. Attebro Perucci of Rome.)

== Career and community advocate ==
Laidlaw was a banker, civic worker, and philanthropist. Politically, he was an independent.

=== Banking ===
When he was eighteen, Laidlaw began working for his father's banking firm, Laidlaw & Company. In 1894, he became partner. The offices were located at 26 Broadway in Manhattan's Financial District. His father died on January 8, 1902, and the firm continued with the surviving partners, Laidlaw, his brother-in-law Edward Roesler, and his uncle Charles E. Laidlaw. In 1911, Laidlaw became a member of the New York Board of Trade.

In 1919, he was one of 300 delegates who attended a meeting to discuss industry relations and develop plans to address existing issues. The delegates represented 82 community councils of national defense. He was a member of the Bankers of America, Metropolitan Stock Exchange, and the New York Chamber of Commerce.

He retired in 1930. He was a board member of the Standard Statistics Company and several other organizations. (Note: After his death, Harriet Burton Laidlaw became the first woman to sit on the board of Standard & Poor's (formerly Standard Statistics Company).)

=== League of Nations ===
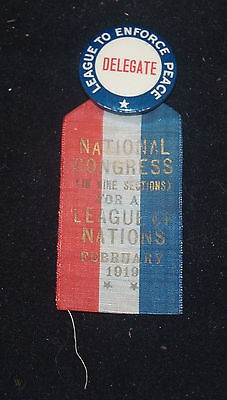
League to Enforce Peace, League of Nations (1919)

After World War I, the League of Nations was formed. In 1919 and 1920, Harriet and James spoke in many states in defense of the organization.

=== Women's rights ===
Harriet was a leader of the Women's suffrage movement, and he also strongly supported the cause. He was the president of the New York State Men's League for Women Suffrage from 1910 to 1920. Its members included leaders in many fields and included prominent bankers, lawyers, and judges. One thousand men participated in a march for women's suffrage in 1912. They were jeered at as they walked down Fifth Avenue. Laidlaw said that he came out to support women and to provide moral support to the men. Having the men participate in the parade, and showing strength while being heckled, with Laidlaw leading them on, provided encouragement to women and more men who joined the cause. Laidlaw was also president of the national Men's League.

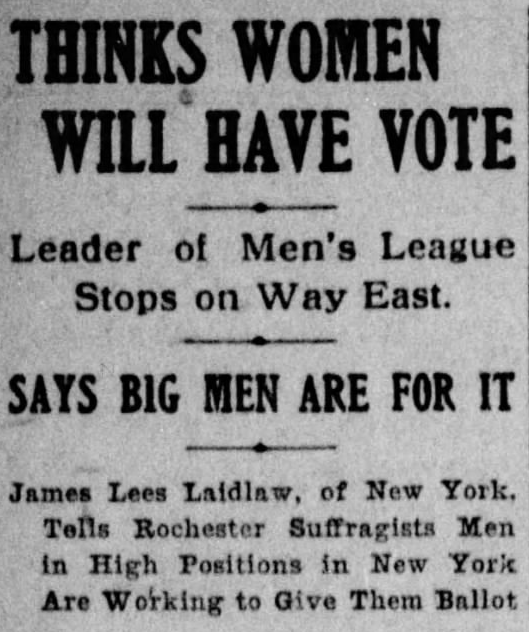
Thinks Women Will Have Vote, James Lees Laidlaw, Democrat and Chronicle, Rochester, New York

Three years after the New York Men's League office opened there were 23 other states with chapters. Laidlaw led the development of a convention in Philadelphia soon after assuming the leadership position, followed by the December 1913 convention in Washington, D.C. Within the state of New York, the League's goal was to ensure that every man in the state that supported women's suffrage become a member of the Men's League. Laidlaw led the proceedings of the men's night of the 4th annual National American Woman Suffrage Association (NAWSA). Several members of the national men's league, with 23,000 members, spoke to the political and economic reasons why women should have the right to vote. Specifically, as women obtained secondary education entered the workforce, it does not make sense that women would not have the right to provide input on issues related to their fields or trades. In 1911 and 1914, Laidlaw and his wife when on two speaking tours to promote women's suffrage in the western states.

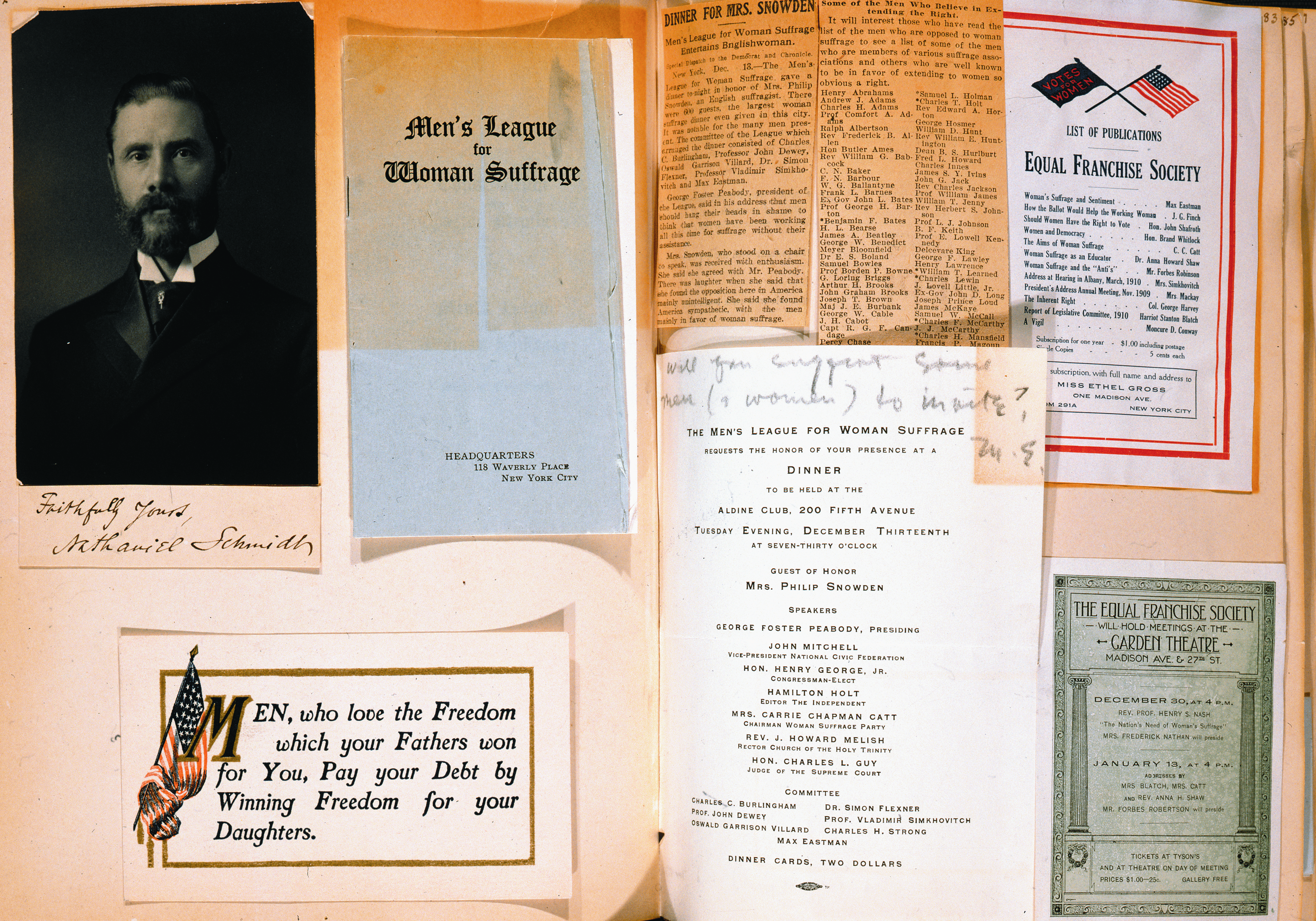
Men's League for Woman Suffrage, Miller Scrapbook, New York

In 1915, 544,457 men voted yes to the suffrage amendment, but that was not enough for it to pass. Laidlaw set the goal of having every man who voted yes to convince one other man to vote yes for the 1917 election. His plea was published in The Christian Science Monitor in November 1915. He felt that goal, along with targeting new voters, college-aged men, would earn the right to vote for women. Women won the right to vote on November 6, 1917. In a speech after the amendment was passed, Laidlaw said, "The women did it. But not by any heroic action, but by hard, steady grinding and good organization. We men too have learned something, we who were auxiliaries to the great women's suffrage party. We have learned to be auxiliaries." Two suffrage memorial tablets were installed at the New York state and United States capitals. His was the only man's name that was placed on the tablet.

James was an unusual spouse for the time; his interest in the cause of woman suffrage matched her own, and together they would spend their married years working toward the common goal of equal rights for all.

— Antonia Petrash, Long Island and the Woman Suffrage Movement

== Personal life ==
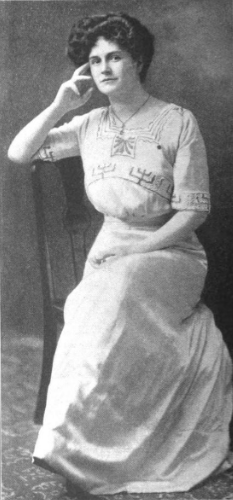
Harriet Burton Laidlaw, "The Feminine Charms of the Woman Militant", Good Housekeeping, 1911

Laidlaw married Harriet Burton on October 25, 1905 and they had a daughter, Louise Burton Laidlaw. Harriet—who studied at University of Chicago, Harvard University, and Oxford University—was a teacher in New York City public schools before their marriage. In college, Harriet studied sanitary science and dietetics, and became interested in the suffrage movement when the realized that the fields are affected by politics. Hazeldean Manor, built in Sands Point on Long Island in 1906 by James and Harriet, is a Mediterranean-style stucco home on three acres. The Laidlaws, both of whom were leaders in the suffrage movement, held fundraisers at their mansion. Named after an Irish ballad, Jock O'Hazeldean, the house stayed in the family until 1995. In Manhattan, they lived at 60 East 66th Street. The Laidlaws were listed on the Brooklyn Blue Book and Long Island Social Register. Louise studied at Oxford University in 1930. Born in 1906, Louise, married Dana Backus and was active in suffrage work and a leader in the Southeast Asia Women's Association and Pan Pacific.

He was member of the Manhasset Bay and New York Yacht Clubs. His personal interests included amateur theatre and the study of birds. He was a member of the Audubon Society. He acquired Parkinson's disease and was cared for by his wife. He became seriously ill about May 1, 1932, and died of pneumonia on May 9 at Hazeldean in Sands Point. He was buried at Green-Wood Cemetery in Brooklyn, New York. Harriet died on January 25, 1949.
