= Harriet Burton Laidlaw =

American social reformer and suffragist

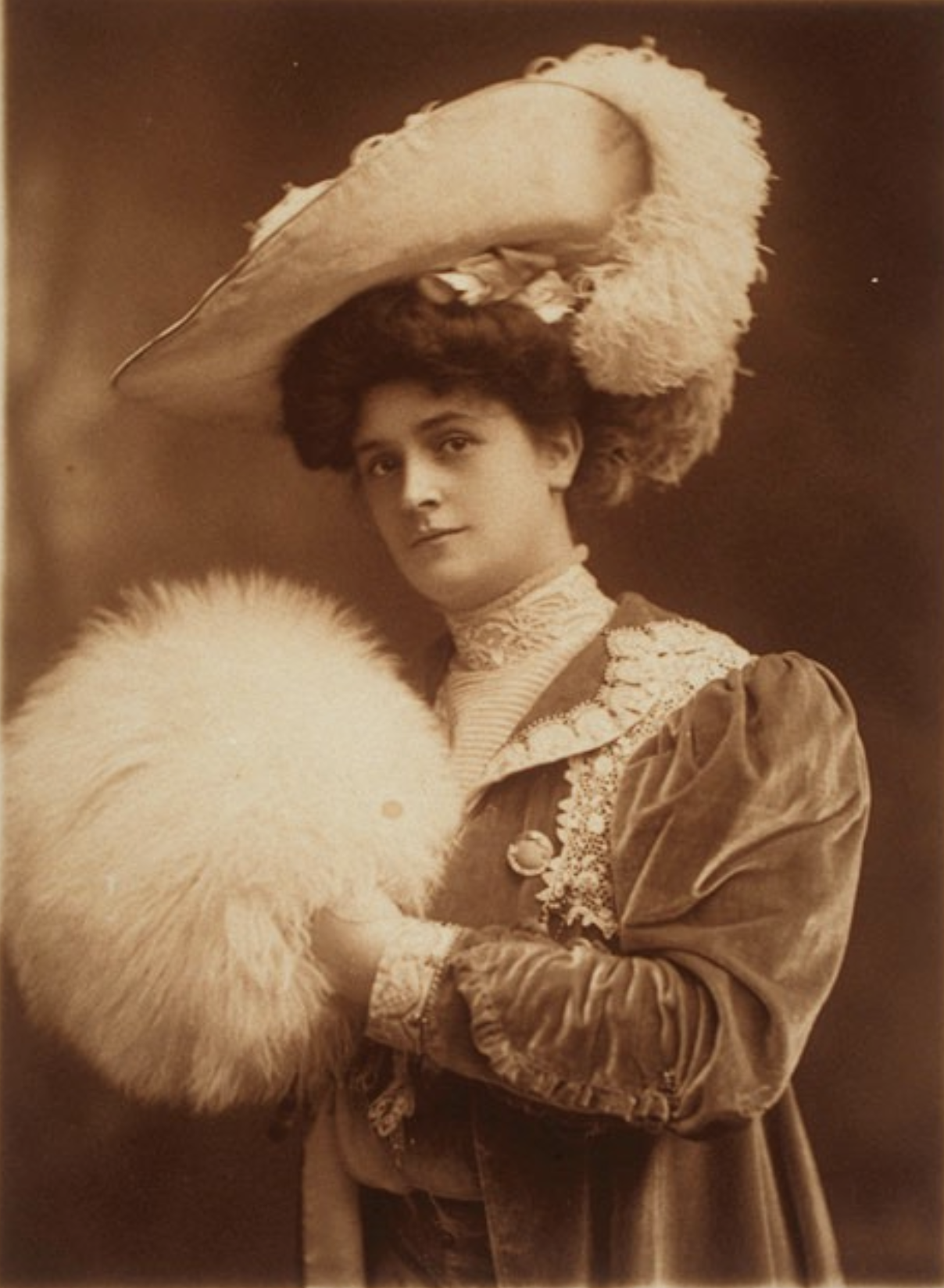
- Portrait of Harriet Burton Laidlaw by Aimé Dupont
- Born: Harriet Wright Burton; December 16, 1873; Albany, New York, U.S.
- Died: January 25, 1949 (aged 75); New York City, New York, U.S.
- Burial place: Green-Wood Cemetery, Brooklyn, New York, U.S.
- Education: New York State Normal College; Illinois Wesleyan University; Barnard College
- Known for: Women's suffrage Women's rights
- Spouse: James Lees Laidlaw (m. 1905; died 1932)
- Children: Louise Burton Laidlaw

Harriet Wright Laidlaw (née Burton; December 16, 1873 – January 25, 1949) was an American social reformer and suffragist. She campaigned in support of the Nineteenth Amendment and the United Nations, and was the first female corporate director of Standard & Poor's.

== Early life and education ==
Harriet Wright Burton was born in Albany, New York, on December 16, 1873, to George Davidson Burton, a bank cashier, and Alice Davenport Wright. After her father died when she was aged six, her mother took her and her two younger brothers to live with his parents. She worked as a page at the New York State Constitutional Convention of 1894, held in Albany.

Burton attended Albany High School, then went on to the New York State Normal College (now the University at Albany, SUNY) where she received a bachelor's degree in pedagogy in 1895 and a master's in 1896. Burton went to Illinois and received a Ph.B from Illinois Wesleyan University in 1898 before returning to New York to attend Barnard College, where she received a B.A. in 1902. She took summer courses at Harvard in 1900, the University of Chicago in 1901, and Oxford University in 1903.

While working as an English teacher in the New York public high school system, she pursued a PhD at Columbia University, but stopped both after her marriage in 1905. She was awarded an honorary LLD degree by Rollins College in 1930.

== Family and personal life ==
Burton married James Lees Laidlaw, a partner in the brokerage firm Laidlaw & Company and a strong advocate of women's rights himself, on October 25, 1905. They had a daughter, Louise Burton Laidlaw, in 1906.

James died of Parkinson's disease in 1932, after which Harriet was named as the only female member the board of directors of Standard & Poors. Harriet died in New York City after a brief illness on January 25, 1949, aged 75. At the time of her death, she was living in Manhattan at 920 Fifth Avenue, and had a vacation home in Sands Point, Long Island.

== Activism ==
Laidlaw gave her first speech in support of women's suffrage to an audience of friends and relatives at the age of 20. She became the secretary of the College Equal Suffrage League in 1908 and the acting Manhattan Borough Chairperson of the Woman Suffrage Party in 1911. The party's founder, Carrie Chapman Catt, asked her to fill the latter position more permanently, and she did so from 1912 to 1916.

In addition to her work in support of women's suffrage, Laidlaw was a crusader against white slavery and the forced prostitution of both white and Chinese women in New York, and was a proponent of the Mann Act of 1910. In 1912, following a violent attack on anti-prostitution activist Rose Livingston, Laidlaw and her husband helped mobilize public opinion against the perceived inaction of Mayor William Jay Gaynor in ordering increased police protection for activists in New York's Chinatown.

On November 9, 1912, she served as chairman of a torchlight parade down Fifth Avenue that drew an estimated 400,000-500,000 observers, an event that solidified her position as a leader of the suffragist movement. She wrote many articles and columns, spoke at public gatherings, and traveled around the country, including a trip through the western United States in 1913 to help organize activists.

Laidlaw spoke out against the notion of separate spheres for men and women in regards to public life, writing in 1912 that, "insofar as women were like men they ought to have the same rights; insofar as they were different they must represent themselves." In 1914, her most significant writing was published, a booklet entitled Organizing to Win by the Political District Plan, which gave activists step-by-step instructions on how to fundraise and engage with their local political leaders to keep up sustained pressure in support of suffrage.

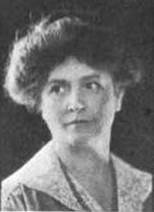
Harriet Burton Laidlaw, 1921

Laidlaw became a director of the National American Woman Suffrage Association (NAWSA) in 1917, and was among a group of leading suffragettes who met with former President Theodore Roosevelt to persuade him to lend support to their cause. Later that year, an amendment to the New York Constitution granting women the vote was passed.

Following the ratification of the Nineteenth Amendment, Laidlaw's attention turned to international relations, and she promoted the United States' entry into the League of Nations as well as the formation of the United Nations. She was a strong supporter of Prohibition and was a member of the New York State Prohibition Society.

== Honors ==
Both Harriet and James Laidlaw were honored by the League of Women Voters on a plaque unveiled in 1931 and now displayed in the New York State Capitol in Albany listing those of “distinguished achievement” in the women's suffrage movement; James is the only man listed.

== Selected writing ==
- Laidlaw, Harriet Burton (1914). Organizing to Win by the Political District Plan. New York: National American Woman Suffrage Association.
- Laidlaw, Harriet Burton (September 24, 1921). "The Other Cheek". What the American Woman Thinks. The Woman Citizen. Vol. VI, no. 9. pp. 14–15.
