= Florida State Road 235 =

State highway in Florida, United States

State Road 235
- Map of SR 235

Route information
- Maintained by FDOT
- Length: 14.613 mi (23.517 km)

Major junctions
- South end: CR 2054 in Alachua
- US 441 in Alachua; SR 121 in LaCrosse
- North end: SR 18 / CR 231 in Brooker

Location
- Country: United States
- State: Florida

Highway system
- Florida State Highway System; Interstate; US; State; Former; Pre‑1945; Toll; Scenic
← SR 231	→ SR 238

State Road 235 (SR 235) is a south–north state highway in Alachua County, Florida. It runs from U.S. Route 441 in Alachua to Brooker, and has county-maintained segments in Alachua and Bradford Counties, which were once part of SR 235.

== Route description ==
The segment that is currently County Road 235 begins at State Road 26, and the first intersection it approaches is County Road 26A, a former segment and suffixed alternate route of SR 26. As it turns to the northeast, it spends much of its time running along the east side of the CSX Brooker Subdivision. This trajectory continues as it intersects CR 232, and later skirts the border of the City of Alachua, where the first major intersection is CR 235A (See below).

CR 235 runs under Interstate 75 with no access, and then moves away from the tracks, curving to the right toward an intersection with CR 241. County Road 235 transitions into State Road 235 near the first intersection with CR 2054, the second of which is just after the road crosses that very same rail line CR 235 ran parallel to almost since Newberry. SR 235 then intersects U.S. Route 441 and subsequently curves off to the east as it breaks away from CR 241, which continues straight north.

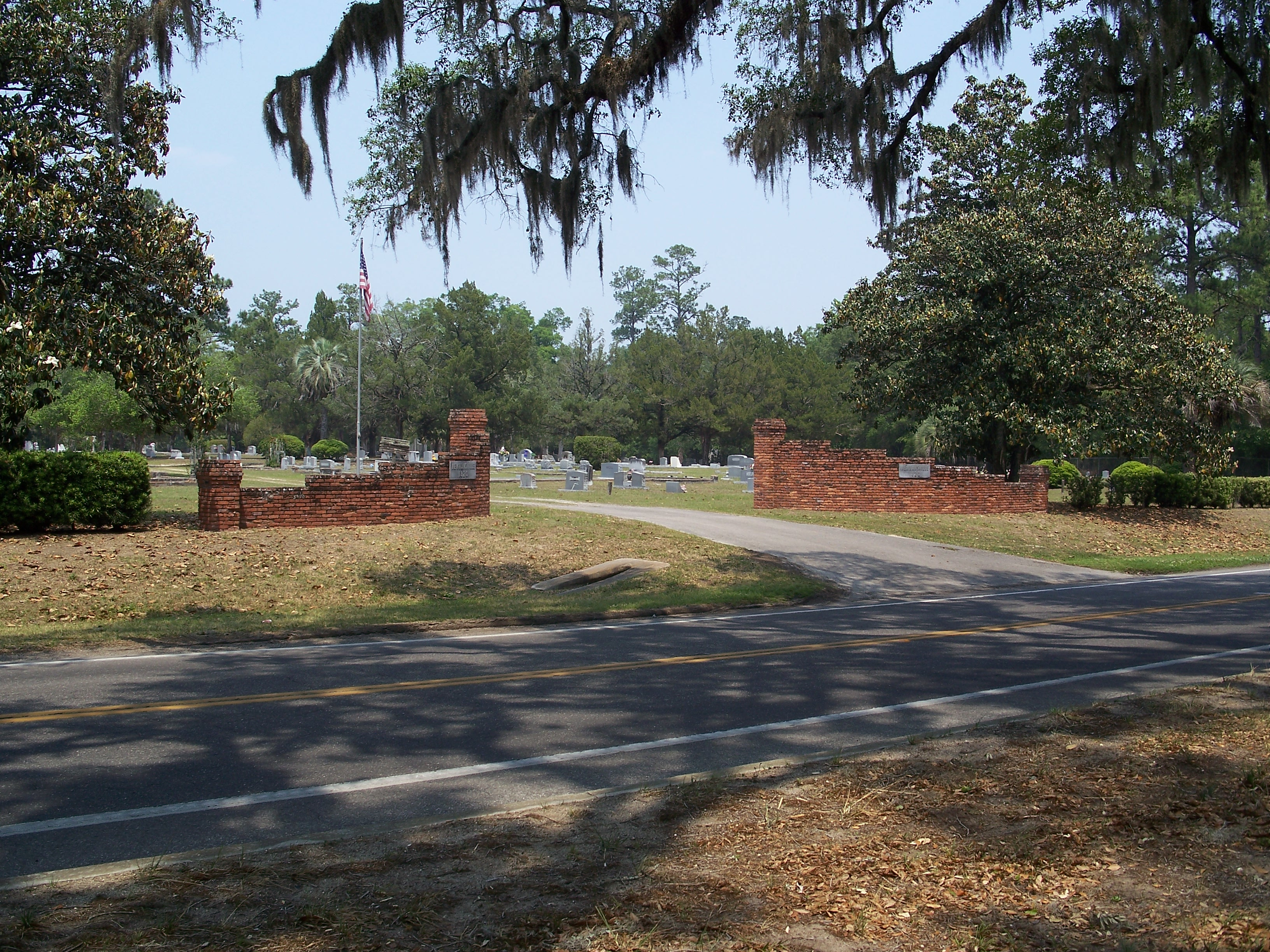
Entrance to Newnansville cemetery, north of Alachua on SR 235

As it leaves Alachua, it enters the site of the former town of Newnansville at Newmansville Cemetery, an area which has been on the National Register of Historic Places since 1974. The road curves back to the northeast, intersecting CR 239, and later enters Hainesworth, where it crosses that same CSX Railroad Line once again, and serves as the northern terminus of CR 237. Once the road enters LaCrosse, it encounters an intersection with State Road 121 where it turns left onto a short concurrency and, after the intersection with CR 121A, turns right again to run east. SR 235 continues to the east briefly leaving the LaCrosse city limits where it crosses a bridge over Rocky Creek, then enters and leaves the city again, maintaining that east-west trajectory until it intersects what would seem to be the northern terminus of CR 231, which secretly continues in a multiplex with the route.

SR 235/CR 231 crosses a high, narrow, old bridge over the Santa Fe River, where it enters Bradford County, and becomes County Roads 231 & 235. Almost instantly it enters Brooker, where it encounters CR 18, and secretly takes a third route in the concurrency. CRs 18/231/235 cross that same railroad line once again, and then CR 18 branches off to the west into State Road 18. North of Brooker, CRs 231/235 curve to the northeast, although one last chance to return to the town comes at the intersection of North Bloxham Street. From here the road curves straight north until the end of the CR 231/235 overlap, where CR 231 makes a smooth turn to the northwest toward Lake Butler, while CR 235 branches off to the northeast. After this CR 235 crosses an unmaintained railroad spur leading to the same line it had encountered since Newberry. The rest of the route runs northeast through farmland with only minor intersections, the most prevalent of which is Southwest 161st Street. It contains a 90-degree intersection replacing a fork in the road, which was adapted as a southwest-bound turning lane. Between Southwest 168th Street and Southwest 132nd Avenue, it encounters the former right-of-way of the Georgia Southern and Florida Railway slated to be replaced by another paved segment of the Palatka-Lake Butler State Trail.

County Road 235 seems to terminate at State Road 100, but joins the road in a hidden concurrency as it heads west toward Lake Butler, Lake City, and northwest to Georgia. Before SR 100 enters Union County, though, CR 235 turns right onto a street known as the "Lester Johns Memorial Highway." It is unmarked along most of this segment, running in general proximity of the southeast side along the New River. Lester Johns Memorial Highway runs northeast until it reaches the McKinney Cemetery, when it turns straight north, only to make a sharp turn to the east. County Road 235 terminates at CR 229 in rural Bradford County southeast of Raiford in Union County.

== Major intersections ==
County	Location	mi	km	Destinations	Notes
Alachua	Newberry	0.000	0.000	SR 26 (West Newberry Road)	
Alachua	Newberry	0.2	0.32	Newberry Lane (CR 26A)	
Alachua		6.1	9.8	CR 232 (Northwest 78th Avenue)	
Alachua	Alachua	8.6	13.8	CR 235A north (Northwest 173rd Street)	
Alachua	Alachua	11.3	18.2	CR 241 south (Northwest 140th Street)	
Alachua	Alachua	11.535	18.564	CR 2054 east (Northwest 143rd Place to Rachael Boulevard)	south end of state maintenance
Alachua	Alachua	11.604	18.675	CR 2054 west (Peggy Road)	
Alachua	Alachua	12.020	19.344	US 441 (M.L. King Memorial Highway / SR 20 / SR 25) to I-75 – High Springs, Gainesville	
Alachua	Alachua	12.531	20.167	CR 241 north	
Alachua		14.054	22.618	CR 239 north	
Alachua		17.095	27.512	CR 237 south	
Alachua	LaCrosse	18.714	30.117	SR 121 south – Gainesville	south end of SR 121 overlap
Alachua	LaCrosse	18.968	30.526	SR 121 north – Worthington Springs, Lake Butler	north end of SR 121 overlap
Alachua		22.570	36.323	CR 231 south – Gainesville	south end of SR 231 overlap
Bradford	Brooker	25.949	41.761	CR 18 east (Charlotte Avenue) – Graham, Starke	south end of SR 18 overlap
Bradford	Brooker	26.148	42.081	SR 18 west – Worthington Springs	north end of SR 18 overlap; north end of state maintenance
Bradford		26.4	42.5	Bloxham Street (CR 235A south)	
Bradford		28.0	45.1	CR 231 north – Lake Butler	north end of CR 231 overlap
Bradford		34.843	56.074	SR 100	
1.000 mi = 1.609 km; 1.000 km = 0.621 mi: Concurrency terminus; Route transition

== Related route ==
County Road 235A
- Location: Alachua–Traxler

County Road 235A is a suffixed alternate of CR 235 that spans from southwestern Alachua to the ghost town of Traxler. The road runs straight north and south from CR 235 where it crosses the CSX railroad line that follows the aforementioned road from Newberry. The first intersection is with CR 2054(Peggy Road).

The one truly major intersection along this road is U.S. Route 441. The northeast corner of US 441 and CR 235A is primarily dominated by the grounds of Santa Fe High School.

The road momentarily leaves the city and enters it again within Spring Hill. From there it makes a reverse curve to the left and then right as it crosses over Interstate 75 with no access to or from the interstate. Returning to its former trajectory, CR 235A enters Traxler, where it briefly joins Old Bellamy Road, and then straightens out again before the historic road turns into a dead end street at I-75. CR 235A terminates at CR 236 between I-75 at Exit 404 and CR 1491.
