= List of county roads in Bradford County, Florida =

- County road shields used in Florida

Highway names
- Interstates: Interstate X (I-X)
- US Highways: U.S. Highway X (US X)
- State: State Road X (SR X)
- County: County Road X (CR X)

System links
- County roads in Florida; County roads in Bradford County

The following is a list of county roads in Bradford County, Florida. All county roads are maintained by the county in which they reside.

== County roads in Bradford County ==
Route	Road Name(s)	From	To	Notes
CR 18	Charlotte Avenue	SR 231 / SR 235 in Brooker	SR 100 east-southeast of Hampton	former SR 18
CR 18	SE 66 Street, SE 9 Avenue	SR 100 southeast of Hampton	SR 100 northwest of Keystone Heights	former SR 18
CR 21B		Dead end south-southwest of Keystone Heights	SR 100 northwest of Keystone Heights	former SR 21B and SR 21A
CR 100A	Edwards Road	SR 100 in Starke	US 301 in Starke	former SR 100A
CR 100A	SE 44th Avenue	SE 44th Avenue south of Starke	US 301 in Starke	former SR 100A; partly inventoried by FDOT as CR 1206
CR 100A		SR 100 south-southeast of Starke	SR 100 south of Starke	former SR 100A
CR 125		CR 125 at the Union–Bradford county line northwest of Lawtey	Entrance to DuPont plant at Bradford–Clay county line northeast of Lawtey	former SR 125
CR 200A	Lake Street	US 301 south-southwest of Lawtey	US 301 / CR 225 (Lake Street) in Lawtey	former SR 200A
CR 200B	Lynwood Avenue	US 301 south-southwest of Lawtey	CR 225 (Lake Street) in Lawtey	former SR 200B
CR 214		SR 21 southwest of Keystone Heights	CR 214 at the Bradford–Clay county line south-southwest of Keystone Heights	former SR 214
CR 221	Navarre Avenue	US 301 southwest of Hampton	US 301 north of Hampton	former SR 221; brief concurrency with CR 18 in Hampton
CR 225		CR 1475 at the Alachua–Bradford county line south of Graham	CR 18 in Graham	former SR 225
CR 225		CR 227 southwest of Starke	SW 21 Street northwest of Sampson City	former SR 225
CR 225		SR 100 west-northwest of Starke	CR 225 at the Bradford–Clay county line south-southeast of Lawtey	former SR 225; brief concurrency with US 301 in Lawtey
CR 225A		CR 225 and NW 57 Avenue west of Lawtey	CR 125 west-northwest of Lawtey	former SR 225A
CR 227		CR 18 west-northwest of Hampton	US 301 and SE 125th Street south-southwest of Starke	former SR 227
CR 229	W. Weldon Street	CR 229 at the Union–Bradford county line south-southeast of Raiford	SR 16 (Raiford Road) in Starke	former SR 229
CR 229A		CR 229 west-southwest of Lawtey	SR 16 west-southwest of Lawtey	former SR 229A
CR 230A		CR 100A southeast of Starke	SR 230 east of Starke	former SR 230A
CR 231	Dedan Loop	CR 18 west-northwest of Graham	CR 18 east of Brooker	former SR 231
CR 231	Bloxham Street	SR 18 / SR 231 / SR 235 / CR 235 in Brooker	CR 231 at the Union–Bradford county line south of Lake Butler	former SR 231
CR 233		CR 229A and NW 74 Street north-northwest of Starke	US 301 and NE 193 Street north-northeast of Starke	former SR 233
CR 235		SR 18 / SR 231 / SR 235 / CR 231 in Brooker	CR 229 southeast of Raiford	former SR 235; unsigned concurrency with SR 100 southeast of Lake Butler
CR 235A	Bloxham Street	CR 18 (Charlotte Avenue) in Brooker	CR 231 / CR 235 north of Brooker	
CR 237		CR 1493 at the Alachua–Bradford county line west-southwest of Brooker	SR 18 northwest of Brooker	former SR 237
CR 325		CR 1471 at the Alachua–Bradford county line south of Hampton	CR 18 / CR 221 (Navarre Avenue) in Hampton	former SR 325
