= Florida State Road 231 =

State highway in Florida, United States

State Road 231
- Florida State Road 231 200 highlighted in red

Route information
- Maintained by FDOT
- Length: 6.317 mi (10.166 km)

Major junctions
- South end: SR 235 near LaCrosse
- SR 18 in Brooker Reception and Medical Center near Lake Butler
- North end: SR 238 in Lake Butler

Location
- Country: United States
- State: Florida

Highway system
- Florida State Highway System; Interstate; US; State; Former; Pre‑1945; Toll; Scenic
← SR 230	→ SR 235

State Road 231 (SR 231), locally known as Dr. Martin Luther King Jr. Avenue and SW 6th Avenue, is a north-south discontinuous route running through Union County, Bradford County, and Alachua County, Florida.

== Route description ==
State Road 231 begins near LaCrosse at the intersection with SR 235 and County Road 231 (former SR 231). From there it heads north, cosigning with SR 235, across the Santa Fe River into Bradford County and Brooker. At the junction with SR 18, state maintenance ends and the road becomes County Road 231, with County Road 235 cosigning. CR 235 leaves the road approximately two miles (3.2 km) north of the junction. The route continues north into Union County, passing CR 231A, and regains state road status near SW 78th Street and the Florida Department of Corrections Reception and Medical Center. The road then heads into Lake Butler, crossing SR 121 and ending at SR 238 several blocks short of SR 100.

== History ==
SR 231 originally terminated at SR 121 roughly six miles (9.7 km) south of its current terminus. The former relinquished segment is signed as County Road 231.

A second piece of CR 231 fills the gap in SR 231 between Brooker and south of Lake Butler. East of Brooker is a third piece looping south off County Road 18 that does not line up with the others, yet was also once known as SR 231.

A final piece begins at SR 100 northwest of Lake Butler and extends north to Olustee, where it crosses US 90 before ending at the shore of Ocean Pond in the Osceola National Forest.

== Major intersections ==
County	Location	mi	km	Destinations	Notes
Alachua	Gainesville	0.000	0.000	SR 121 – Gainesville, LaCrosse	
Alachua		3.0	4.8	Northwest 156th Avenue (CR 340 east)	
Alachua		6.018	9.685	SR 235 south – LaCrosse	south end of state maintenance; south end of SR 235 overlap
Bradford	Brooker	9.397	15.123	CR 18 east (Charlotte Avenue) – Graham, Starke	south end of SR 18 overlap
Bradford	Brooker	9.596	15.443	SR 18 west – Worthington Springs	north end of SR 18 overlap; north end of state maintenance
Bradford		10.0	16.1	Bloxham Street (CR 235A south)	
Bradford		11.5	18.5	CR 235 north	north end of CR 235 overlap
Union		16.1	25.9	CR 231A west	
Union		17.1	27.5	Southwest 73rd Street	South end of state maintenance
Union	Lake Butler	19.6	31.5	SR 121 (Southwest 6th Street)	
Union	Lake Butler	19.8	31.9	SR 238 (Southwest 2nd Street / Southwest 6th Avenue) – Providence	
1.000 mi = 1.609 km; 1.000 km = 0.621 mi: Concurrency terminus; Route transition
