= Florida State Road 18 =

Highway in Florida, US

State Road 18
- SR 18 in red, CR 18 in blue, CR 18A in purple

Route information
- Maintained by FDOT
- Length: 6.600 mi (10.622 km)

Major junctions
- West end: SR 121 in Worthington Springs
- East end: SR 231 / SR 235 in Brooker

Location
- Country: United States
- State: Florida
- Counties: Union, Bradford

Highway system
- Florida State Highway System; Interstate; US; State; Former; Pre‑1945; Toll; Scenic
← SR 17	→ US 19

State Road 18 (SR 18) is a short state road in the U.S. state of Florida. It begins in Worthington Springs in southern Union County and travels eastward for 6.60 miles (10.62 km) into Bradford County until it becomes County Road 18 at Brooker. It also has county road extensions, one of which is between Fort White and Worthington Springs, and the other between Brooker and SR 100 north of Theressa.

== Related routes ==
=== Columbia and Union Counties ===
County Road 18
- Location: Fort White–Worthington Springs

West of Worthington Springs, County Road 18 is a bi-county road that extends from US 27 (SR 20) in Fort White as County Road 18, also known as Southwest Fellowship Street along the O'Leno to Ichetucknee Trail. The road takes a slight curve to the northeast that ends near the intersection of County Road 131 just south of that road's own intersection with CR 238. At the west end of the short concurrency with US 41/441 (SR 25) in Mikesville, CR 18 turns north, while the trail turns south towards O'Leno State Park. Once the concurrency ends, CR 18 turns east again at the intersection of Hammock Road, and becomes Southeast Sebring Street.

Though the road isn't necessarily straight, CR 18 still runs relatively east and west, including when it uses a bridge over Interstate 75 with no access. Later on, it crosses the Columbia-Union County line at a bridge over Olustee Creek, and becomes County Road 18. Along this segment are semi-notable intersections such as CR 791, and then CR 241 which runs through three other counties. Later it serves as the southern terminus of both CR 239 and then CR 238A. The road just enters northern Worthington Springs, Florida at the intersection with State Road 121, then follows that route south in a hidden concurrency with the state road it was originally part of.

==== County Road 18A ====
County Road 18A
- Location: Near Worthington Springs

County Road 18A is the one suffixed alternate route of SR 18. It begins at SR 18 east of the Worthington Springs town limits and heads north, around the west and north side of a local airport named Flying Tiger Field, although on the north side of this airport it runs northeast and southwest. Before the intersection with Southwest 131st Lane the route turns east and then curves to the north at the two intersections with Southwest 142nd Place. It takes a curve to the northwest after a dead end street named Southwest 53rd Terrace, but take a far more drastic turn west at the intersection of Southwest 63rd Street, a connecting route to CR 231A. CR 18A ends at SR 121 across from the eastern terminus of CR 239A.

=== Bradford County ===
County Road 18
- Location: Brooker–near Theressa

County Road 18 is the other county extension of SR 18. It begins at CR 231/CR 235 in Brooker and runs east along the north side of the Santa Fe River. Leaving the town limits, it eventually approaches an intersection with County Road 231 which runs closer to the county line in a half loop, and is not the same CR 231 that is overlapped by CR 235. After the east end of the CR 231 loop, the road enters Graham where it serves as the northern terminus of CR 225 then curves to the northeast until it branches off to the east again, and CR 227 serves as the replacement route for the same road.

The surroundings of the route are primarily wooded with occasional breaks of private property, but then runs along the northeast shore of Hampton Lake. Once it leaves the vicinity of the lake, County Road 18 is named Navarre Avenue and then has a major intersection with US 301 in Hampton. Within that city, CR 18 has a concurrency with CR 221, and then has an at-grade crossing with the CSX Wildwood Subdivision, which is part of the S-Line, and carried Amtrak's Silver Star/Palmetto line until November 2004. Later, it has an intersection with the northern terminus of CR 325, just before CR 221 veers off to the left, heading northeast back to US 301. Leaving Hampton, the route turns southeast and will keep this trajectory until it seems to terminate at SR 100 near Theressa. However CR 18 secretly runs south along a concurrency with SR 100 until it reaches Southeast Ninth Avenue, veering straight and later turning onto Southeast Second Place which leads to Crystal Lake on the Alachua-Clay County line where the route ends.

== Major intersections ==
County	Location	mi	km	Destinations	Notes
Columbia		0.000	0.000	US 27 (SR 20) – High Springs, Branford, Ichetucknee Springs State Park	
Columbia		4.1	6.6	Southwest Tustenuggee Avenue (CR 131 north)	
Columbia		6.368	10.248	US 41 / US 441 (SR 25)	
Columbia	Gap in route				
Columbia	Mikesville	0.000	0.000	US 41 / US 441 (SR 25)	
Union		5.4	8.7	CR 791 north	
Union		6.0	9.7	CR 241 – Providence, Alachua	
Union		8.9	14.3	CR 239 north	
Union		9.8	15.8	CR 238A north (Southwest 107th Avenue)	
Union	Worthington Springs	11.004	17.709	SR 121	
Union	Worthington Springs	Gap in route			
Union	Worthington Springs	0.000	0.000	SR 121 – Gainesville, Lake Butler	west end of state maintenance
Union		0.415	0.668	CR 18A north	
Bradford		4.446	7.155	CR 237 south	
Bradford	Brooker	6.401	10.301	CR 231 north / CR 235 north – Lake Butler	west end of SR 231 / SR 235 overlap
Bradford	Brooker	6.600	10.622	SR 231 south / SR 235 south – LaCrosse	east end of SR 231 / SR 235 overlap; east end of state maintenance
Bradford		6.8	10.9	CR 235A north (Bloxham Street)	
Bradford		8.1	13.0	CR 231 east	
Bradford		12.5	20.1	CR 231 west	
Bradford	Graham	14.2	22.9	CR 225 south	
Bradford		16.056	25.840	CR 227 north	
Bradford	Hampton	18.7	30.1	US 301 (SR 200)	
Bradford	Hampton	19.540	31.447	CR 221 south	west end of CR 221 overlap
Bradford	Hampton	20.0	32.2	CR 325 south	
Bradford	Hampton	20.1	32.3	CR 221 north	east end of CR 221 overlap
Bradford		24.3	39.1	SR 100	
1.000 mi = 1.609 km; 1.000 km = 0.621 mi: Concurrency terminus; Route transition
