= List of county roads in Flagler County, Florida =

- County road shields used in Florida

Highway names
- Interstates: Interstate X (I-X)
- US Highways: U.S. Highway X (US X)
- State: State Road X (SR X)
- County: County Road X (CR X)

System links
- County roads in Florida; County roads in Flagler County

The following is a list of county roads in Flagler County, Florida, United States. All county roads are maintained by the county in which they reside, however not all of them are marked with standard MUTCD approved county road shields.

This list only includes routes numbered in the statewide grid, not those numbered internally by the county.

== List of County Roads in Flagler County, Florida ==
#	Road Name(s)	Direction and Termini					Notes
CR 13		S/N	US 1 (SR 5)	Bunnell	Old Brick Road	St. Johns County line northwest of Palm Coast	Former SR 13
CR 25		S/N	CR 302	South-southwest of Bimini	SR 20 / SR 100	West of Bimini	
CR 35		S/N	Canal Avenue / Forest Park Street	Southwest of Bimini	SR 20 / SR 100	West of Bimini	
CR 201	John Anderson Highway	S/N	CR 201 Palm Drive	Volusia County line south-southeast of Palm Coast Flagler Beach	SR 100 / Roberts Road Dead end	Flagler Beach Flagler Beach	Former SR 201
CR 205		S/N	SR 20 / SR 100	East-southeast of Bimini	CR 13	Espanola	Former SR 205; part of the Heritage Crossroads Florida Scenic Highway
CR 302		W/E	CR 305	Southwest of Bimini	SR 20 / SR 100	West of Bunnell	Former SR 302
CR 304	DuPont Road	S/N	CR 305	Deanville	US 1 (SR 5)	Dupont	Former SR 304
CR 305		S/N	CR 305	Volusia County line west-southwest of Deanville	SR 20 / SR 100	West-southwest of Bimini	Former SR 305
CR 325		S/N	CR 2002	Korona	CR 330	North of Korona	
CR 330		W/E	Dead end	North-northwest of Korona	Dead end	North-northeast of Korona	
CR 1421	Hargrove Road						
CR 1422	Main Street, Otis Stone Hunter Road	W/E	CR 13	Espanola	US 1 (SR 5)	Palm Coast	
CR 1424	Palm Coast Parkway, Hammond Dunes Bridge, Camino del Mar	W/E	US 1 (SR 5)	Palm Coast	SR A1A / Yacht Harbor Drive	Bon Terra	
CR 2001	Old Kings Highway	S/N	CR 2001	Volusia County line south-southeast of Palm Coast	Hidden Lakes Drive / Old Kings Road	Palm Coast	Former SR 5A
CR 2002	Old Dixie Highway	W/E	US 1 (SR 5)	Korona	I-95 exit 278 / Old Dixie Highway	Volusia County line south-southeast of Palm Coast	
CR 2003	Old Haw Creek Road	S/N	unknown road	South of Bunnell	SR 11	Bunnell	
CR 2005	Water Oak Drive	S/N	CR 2006	East of St. Johns Park	SR 20 / SR 100	West-southwest of Bimini	
CR 2006		W/E	Dead end	Bull Creek Campground in St. Johns Park	CR 305	South-southwest of Bimini	Former SR 318
CR 2007		S/N	Russell Landing	Haw Creek south-southwest of Bimini	CR 2006	South-southwest of Bimini	
CR 2009		S/N	Dead end	East of Lake Disston south-southwest of Deanville	CR 305	South-southwest of Deanville	Former SR 305A
