= Florida State Road 100 =

Highway in Florida

State Road 100
- Florida State Road 100 highlighted in red

Route information
- Maintained by FDOT
- Length: 153.173 mi (246.508 km)
- Existed: 1945 renumbering (definition)–present

Major junctions
- West end: US 129 / SR 11 at the Georgia state line
- US 90 / US 41 / US 441 in Lake City; SR 121 in Lake Butler; US 301 in Starke; US 17 / SR 20 in Palatka; US 1 / SR 11 in Bunnell; I-95 in Palm Coast
- East end: SR A1A in Flagler Beach

Location
- Country: United States
- State: Florida
- Counties: Hamilton, Columbia, Union, Bradford, Clay, Putnam, Flagler

Highway system
- Florida State Highway System; Interstate; US; State; Former; Pre‑1945; Toll; Scenic
| ← SR 99 | → SR 101 |

State Road 100 (SR 100) is a 153-mile-long (246 km) east–west highway serving northeast Florida. Its western terminus is at the Georgia-Florida state line four miles (6.4 km) north of Avoca, Florida (its continuation in Georgia is State Route 11); its eastern terminus is an intersection with Shore Scenic Highway (SR A1A) in Flagler Beach. The portion west of Lake City is only signed as portions of US 41 and US 129, both of which run north–south.

== Route description ==
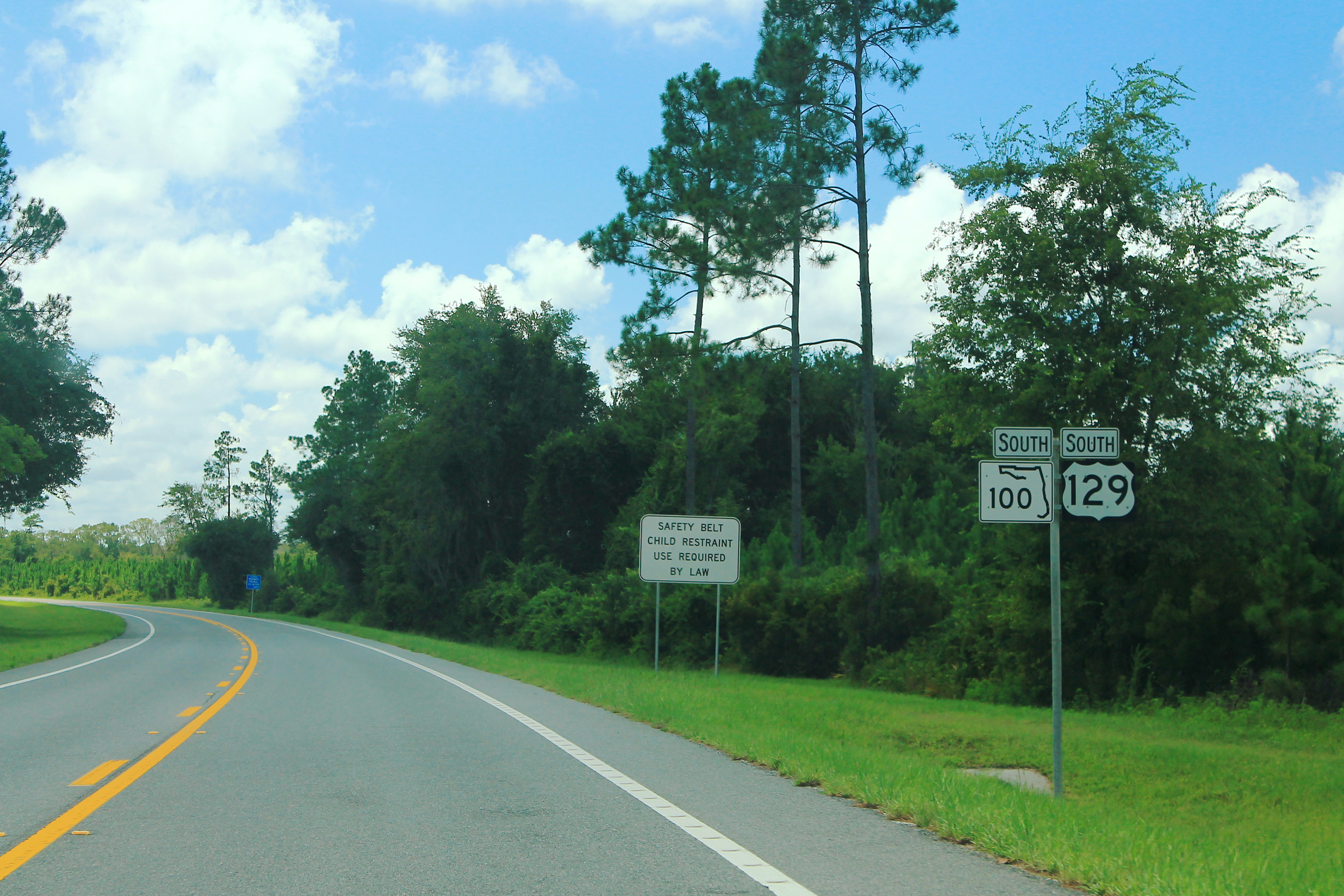
Eastbound FL 100 (marked as southbound) and southbound US 129 just after crossing the Florida-Georgia border.

The northernmost eight miles (13 km) of SR 100 are signed (north–south) as US 129. For three miles (4.8 km) in Jasper, it merges with US 41 (hidden SR 25) before separating from US 129 (which has the hidden Florida Department of Transportation designation SR 51 between the split and Live Oak). The overlap with US 41 terminates in Lake City, when it turns east onto US 90 (hidden SR 10), which is also joined by another hidden overlap with SR 47 until that route turns north at the intersection with US 441 (hidden SR 25A).

East of Lake City, SR 100 is signed east–west as it continues along a northwest–southeast pathway toward the Atlantic Ocean, running along the southern border of the Lake City Gateway Airport, then passing through the community of Lulu, and later crossing the bridge over the Olustee Creek, and thus crossing the Columbia-Union county line.

East of the intersection of Union County Road 100A, SR 100 crosses over a bridge over Swift Creek, but doesn't cross any county or other municipal borders. Only after the intersection with Union County Road 231 does the road enter the city limits of Lake Butler where it encounters the eastern terminus of Florida State Road 238 and the western terminus of the Palatka-Lake Butler State Trail. Curving away from the trail, the route passes through downtown Lake Butler. After the intersection with SR 121, SR 100 leaves the Lake Butler city limits. The route encounters the bridge over Richland Creek but remains in Union County until it reaches the bridge across the New River, where it crosses the Union-Bradford county line. Just under 12 miles later, the road enters Starke, where it encounters an interchange with US Alternate 301, the truck bypass around the city. After the interchange SR 100 adopts the name Madison Street. SR 100 runs straight west to east along Madison until Orange Street, where it resumes its original southwest to northeast trajectory through the intersection with mainline US 301 (Temple Avenue / SR 200).

Beyond US 301, SR 100 forms the southern border of the Call Street Historic District. The route climbs a bridge over the CSX Wildwood Subdivision, and then makes a sharp right turn towards the south-southeast direction. Along the way it passes through the rural community of Theressa, where it intersects Bradford County Road 18, an eastern county extension of SR 18. SR 100 secretly takes CR 18 with it in an overlap, then lets the county road branch out on its own again south of the road to Keystone Heights Airport. The road briefly curves to the southwest momentarily crossing the Palatka-Lake Butler State Trail just before curving back to the southeast as it crosses the Bradford-Clay county line and enters Keystone Heights. Even within the semi-urban surroundings of the city, the closest resemblance to a major intersection in Keystone Heights is SR 21.

The route begins curving away from the trail before entering Lake Geneva. An intersection with 5th Street leads to the boat ramp to the namesake of the community, and it shared by the western terminus of the hidden overlap with Clay CR 214. CR 214 breaks away from the overlap east of where the routes leave Lake Geneva and enter Melrose. The last intersection with a route designation in Clay County, is Clay CR 219. and the last intersection in Clay County at large is with the historic Old Bellamy Road at the Clay-Putnam County Line

The trail returns to the north side of the road just before the intersection with Forest Hills Road in Putnam Hall where the road serves as the eastern terminus of SR 26. The road and the trail separate from each other again, as they pass through the hills, lakes and former sand mines but returns again within the communities such as Grandin and Florahome. Straying from the trail one more time, SR 100 curves more to the southeast as it passes by Q. I. Roberts Jr-Sr High School across from the intersection with Holloway Road, which serves as an entrance to Etoniah Creek State Forest. East of the school, the trail rejoins SR 100 and remains along the north side as they both pass through the barely existing communities of Baywood and Carraway. It also passes through the Rice Creek Conservation Area before entering Springside, where it intersects CR 309D and then 309C. Between these two intersections, SR 100 gains the street name Reid Street. One last trailhead for the state trail is encountered on the north side before the south side is flanked by the Palatka Municipal Airport where the route officially enters the City of Palatka, just before the intersection with CR 216, which is also where the trail finally comes to an end.

The first major intersection in the city is with SR 19, which is where the route also acquires the Truck Route for Florida State Road 20. From there the road remains relatively in the same direction, mostly surrounded by commercial zoning until it curves more towards the southeast before merging with US 17 (hidden SR 15), taking Reid Street along for the ride. Together, US 17-SR 100-Truck Route 20 crosses the CSX Sanford Subdivision and the Old Atlantic Coast Line Union Depot which is used as the Amtrak station, and a local railroad museum. Less than a block after passing an abandoned church, motorists will approach North 9th Street, where the routes encounter SR 20. FDOT officially claims that SR 20 runs in a concurrency with SR 100 until the northern terminus of the overlap with US 1 in Bunnell, but no reassurance signs for that route can be found along this segment. Either way, the route passes Larimer Arts Center and Riverfront Park just west of the bridge crossing at St. Johns River. After the bridge, US 17-SR 100 curves more towards the south at the intersection with SR 207.

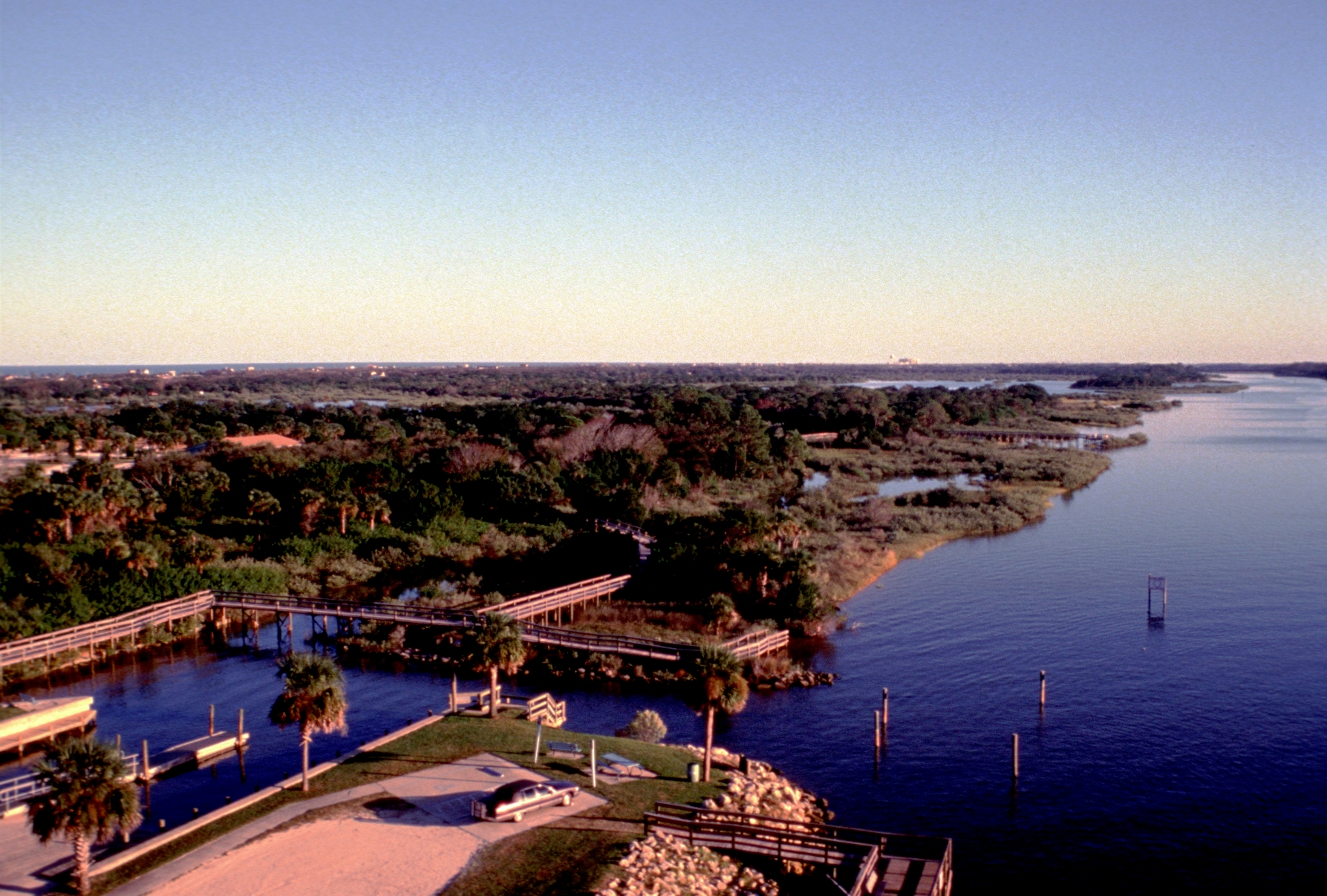
Flagship Harbor Preserve from the State Road 100 Bridge

State Road 100 separates from US 17 in San Mateo and passes along the east side of the Dunns Creek Wildlife Management Area (SJRWMD property) and Crescent Lake. The road crosses the Putnam-Flagler County Line without any signage, and continues in a more easterly direction through Andalusia (formerly Shell Bluff), Bimini, and Bunnell, where SR 100 overlaps U.S. Route 1 (SR 5) for a mile. At the northern terminus of SR 11, SR 100 breaks away from the overlap with US 1 and passes by the Flagler Executive Airport and Flagler Executive Seaport. Along the property of this airport the route enters the southern reaches of Palm Coast. Sparse development can be found along this segment including the AdventHealth Palm Coast Hospital just before encountering the interchange with Interstate 95 at Exit 284. After the interstate, SR 100 will pass under an A-Framed Footbridge under construction for the proposed Bulow Trail and Bulow Creek Headwaters Park. Development is spotted along the road again, as the route heads for the bridge over the Matanzas River (Intracoastal Waterway), passing over the Flagship Harbor Preserve and Betty Steflik Park before entering Flagler Beach and terminating three blocks later at SR A1A on the Atlantic coast.

== Major intersections ==
| County | Location | mi | km | Destinations | Notes |
|---|---|---|---|---|---|
| Hamilton | | 0.000 | 0.000 | US 129 north / SR 11 north – Statenville, Lakeland | Georgia state line |
see US 129 (mile 87.881-76.954) and US 41 (mile 466.038-434.658)
| Columbia | Lake City | 38.906 | 62.613 | US 90 west (West Duval Street / SR 10) / US 41 south / US 441 Truck south (Main Boulevard / SR 25 / SR 47) to I-75 – Live Oak, High Springs | east end of US 41 / US 441 Truck / SR 25 overlap; west end of US 90 / SR 10 / SR 47 overlap |
| Columbia | Lake City | 39.047 | 62.840 | US 441 (Marion Avenue / SR 25A south / SR 47 north) – Downtown Lake City | east end of SR 47 overlap |
| Columbia | Watertown | 41.069 | 66.094 | US 90 east (SR 10) / Northeast Bascom Norris Drive (CR 100A west) – Macclenny | east end of US 90 / SR 10 overlap |
| Columbia | Watertown | 41.349 | 66.545 | SR 10A (Southeast Baya Drive) to US 90 east | |
| Columbia | Watertown | 41.862 | 67.370 | CR 245 | |
| Columbia | | 43.021 | 69.236 | CR 245A south | |
| Columbia | Lulu | 49.634 | 79.878 | CR 241 south | |
| Union | | 51.667 | 83.150 | CR 239 south | |
| Union | | 54.956 | 88.443 | CR 100A east | |
| Union | | 59.461 | 95.693 | CR 231 north – Olustee | |
| Union | Lake Butler | 60.332 | 97.095 | SR 238 west (Dr. M.L. King Jr. Avenue) / CR 238 north (Northwest 6th Avenue) to SR 231 south – Sanderson, Providence, Reception and Medical Center | |
| Union | Lake Butler | 61.537 | 99.034 | SR 121 – Gainesville, Macclenny | |
| Union | | 63.928 | 102.882 | CR 237 south (Seeber Johns Road) | |
| Union | | 64.176 | 103.281 | CR 237 north | |
| New River | | 65.00 | 104.61 | Long Bridge | |
| Bradford | | 65.579 | 105.539 | CR 235 north | |
| Bradford | | 66.879 | 107.631 | CR 235 south | |
| Bradford | | 71.321 | 114.780 | CR 225 north | |
| Bradford | Starke | 74.088 | 119.233 | CR 100A east – National Guard Armory | |
| Bradford | Starke | | | US 301 Alt. (Starke Bypass / SR 223) – Jacksonville, Gainesville | Interchange; Truck bypass of US 301 |
| Bradford | Starke | 75.641 | 121.732 | US 301 (Temple Avenue / SR 200) to SR 16 – Lawtey, Gainesville | |
| Bradford | Starke | | | SR 230 Truck east (South Saint Clair Street) | Moved from South Water Street during bridge construction |
| Bradford | | 77.071 | 124.034 | CR 100A east | |
| Bradford | | 79.332 | 127.672 | CR 100A west | |
| Bradford | | 83.291 | 134.044 | CR 18 west – Hampton | west end of CR 18 overlap |
| Bradford | | 84.594 | 136.141 | CR 18 east (Southeast 9th Avenue) | east end of CR 18 overlap |
| Bradford | | 85.196 | 137.110 | CR 18 west (Southeast 66th Street) | |
| Bradford | | 86.086 | 138.542 | CR 21B south | |
| Clay | | 87.653 | 141.064 | CR 100B east | |
| Clay | Keystone Heights | 88.089 | 141.766 | CR 100B west | |
| Clay | Keystone Heights | 88.363 | 142.206 | SR 21 – Melrose, Middleburg, Gold Head Branch State Park | |
| Clay | Lake Geneva | 89.940 | 144.744 | CR 214 east | |
| Clay | | 90.774 | 146.087 | CR 214 west | |
| Clay | | 91.897 | 147.894 | CR 219 south | |
| Putnam | Putnam Hall | 93.834 | 151.011 | SR 26 west – Melrose | |
| Putnam | Grandin | 96.909 | 155.960 | CR 315 – Interlachen | |
| Putnam | | 109.503 | 176.228 | CR 309D north – Bardin | |
| Putnam | Springside | 110.129 | 177.235 | CR 309C south | |
| Putnam | | 112.133 | 180.461 | CR 216 east | |
| Putnam | Palatka | 113.126 | 182.059 | SR 19 – Salt Springs, St. Johns River State College, truck route to SR 20 west | |
| Putnam | Palatka | 113.935 | 183.361 | US 17 north (SR 15) | west end of US 17 / SR 15 overlap |
| Putnam | Palatka | 115.130 | 185.284 | SR 20 west (9th Street) – Interlachen, Ravine Gardens State Park, Destin, Niceville | west end of SR 20 overlap |
| Putnam | | 116.1 | 186.8 | Memorial Bridge over St. Johns River | |
| Putnam | East Palatka | 117.782 | 189.552 | SR 207 north – Hastings, St. Augustine | |
| Putnam | San Mateo | 120.783 | 194.381 | US 17 south (SR 15) – Pomona Park | east end of US 17 / SR 15 overlap |
| Flagler | | 134.540 | 216.521 | CR 2005 south (Water Oak Road) | |
| Flagler | | 137.528 | 221.330 | CR 305 south – St. Johns Park, Seville | |
| Flagler | | 139.026 | 223.741 | CR 205 north – Espanola, Flagler County Recreation Area and Fairgrounds | |
| Flagler | | 141.209 | 227.254 | CR 302 west | |
| Flagler | Bunnell | 144.560 | 232.647 | US 1 north (SR 5) – St. Augustine | east end of SR 20 overlap; west end of US 1 / SR 5 overlap |
| Flagler | Bunnell | 144.982 | 233.326 | US 1 south (South State Street / SR 5) / SR 11 south (West Moody Boulevard) – Daytona Beach, DeLand | east end of US 1 / SR 5 overlap |
| Flagler | Palm Coast | 149.71 | 240.93 | I-95 (SR 9) – Jacksonville, Miami | I-95 exit 284 |
| Flagler | Palm Coast | 149.977 | 241.365 | Old Kings Road (CR 2001 south) - Palm Coast, Bulow Plantation Ruins | |
| Flagler | Flagler Beach | 151.986 | 244.598 | John Anderson Highway (CR 201 south) | |
| Flagler | Flagler Beach | 152.54 | 245.49 | Flagler Beach Bridge over Intracoastal Waterway | |
| Flagler | Flagler Beach | 153.173 | 246.508 | SR A1A – Beverly Beach, Marineland, Ormond Beach, Washington Oaks Gardens State Park, Gamble Rogers State Park | |
1.000 mi = 1.609 km; 1.000 km = 0.621 mi: Concurrency terminus

== Related routes ==
State Road 100 contains a total of six suffixed alternates in four counties.

=== Bradford County ===
County Road 100A
- Location: Starke

County Road 100A can be found in two locations outside of Starke, Florida. The first segment is southeast of Starke on the east side of the road. It begins as Southeast Creek 100A running northeast until after the intersection with Southeast 125th Terrace, where it then turns north, winding around the farmland east of the city. Further north it crosses a railroad line at the intersection with Southeast 142nd Street. Before the intersection with Southeast 144th Street, it makes a sharp left turn where it later intersects unmarked County Road 230A, a suffixed route of State Road 230. The road continues westward to cross the same railroad line and terminates back at SR 100, but 144th Street continues westward toward Southeast Eighth Street, which crosses the CSX Wildwood Subdivision, and turns right onto Alexander Road leading to US 301.

The second County Road 100A begins at US 301 as Edwards Road and runs west. From Orange Avenue it continues straight west until after it crosses a bridge over a tributary to Alligator Creek, where it leaves the city limits and approaches another railroad line that terminates at the CSX Wildwood Subdivision, and then curves to the southwest. Eventually it makes a reverse J-hook curve to the north where it crosses the aforementioned railroad line, running through the forests west of the city before re-entering the city limits where it curves to the northeast and terminates at its parent route.

==== County Road 100A1 ====
County Road 100A1
- Location: Starke

County Road 100A1 is signed as CR 100A, and has no connection to SR 100, but it is officially recognized as CR 100A1. The road begins as a dirt road south of the city that crosses a creek leading to Lake Rowell and becomes paved. That paved section runs north between US 301 and the CSX Wildwood Subdivision. The road doesn't enter the city limits until north of Southeast 145th Terrace, and finally terminates at US 301.

=== Union County ===
County Road 100A
- Location: Union County

County Road 100A is located northwest of Lake Butler. It begins at SR 100 northwest of the bridge over Swift Creek, and heads northeast into County Road 231.

=== Columbia County ===
County Road 100A
- Location: Watertown-Lake City

County Road 100A is known as Northwest Bascom Norris Drive, and Northeast Bascom Norris Drive. It begins at the southeast end of the concurrency of SR 100 with US 90 (SR 10) in Watertown, east of Lake City as Northeast Bascom Norris Drive. From there it runs north of US 90, intersecting with US 441 (SRs 25A/47) where it becomes Northwest Bascom Norris Drive, and eventually terminates at US 41 (SRs 25/100), where it also rejoins its parent route.

=== Clay County ===
County Road 100B
- Location: Keystone Heights

County Road 100B is located on the north side of SR 100 Keystone Heights in Clay County, Florida. The route consists of Hebron Avenue in its entirety. an NW Berea Avenue south of Hebron Avenue. Both segments are in the Park of the Palms assisted living community.
