= Etoniah Creek State Forest =

State forest in Florida, United States

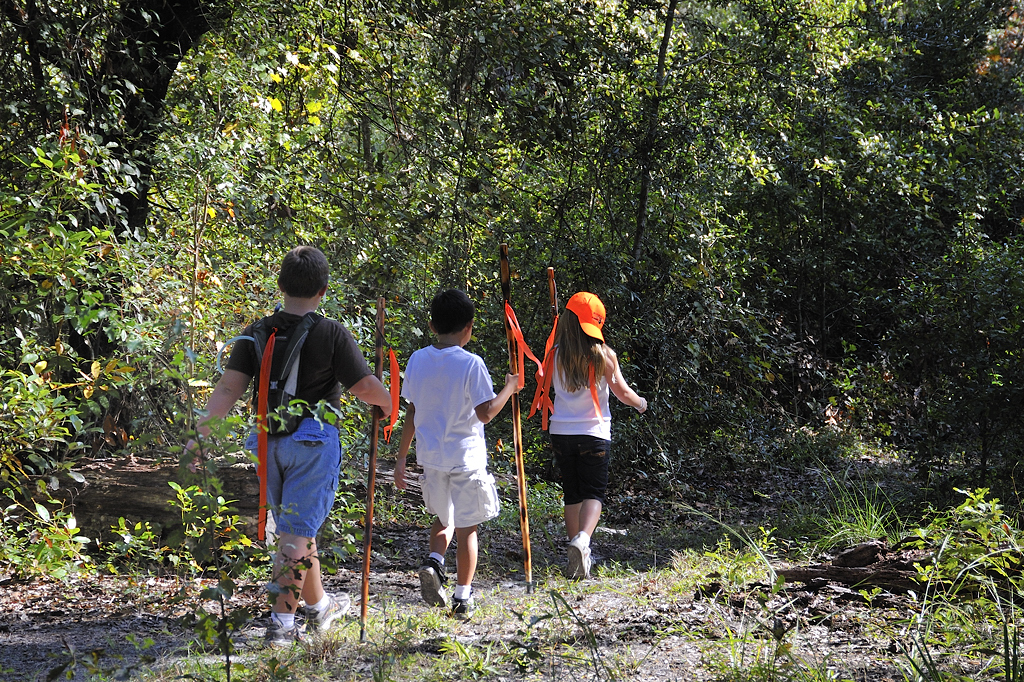
- Children hiking Florida Trail at Etoniah Creek State Forest, October 2009

- Location within Florida
- Location: Putnam County, Florida
- Nearest city: Florahome
- Coordinates: 29°44′56.94″N 81°50′41.86″W
- Area: 8,679 acres (3,512 ha)
- Other information: hiking, fishing, hunting, horseback riding

Etoniah Creek State Forest is in the U.S. state of Florida. The 8,679-acre (35 km^{2}) forest is located in North Central Florida, west of Palatka near Florahome. This area is the only known site for Conradina etonia, an endangered plant.

Etoniah Creek forest has two tracts. The main tract runs from Coral Farms Road southwest of Georges Lake toward the north side of Florida State Road 100 east of Florahome, and includes the creek of the namesake of the forest. The Manning Tract is northeast of the main tract along Putnam County Road 309D (Bardin Road), and is named for Manning Road, a local side street on the west side of that route.

The Palatka-Lake Butler State Trail bisects the southern edge of the forest. The Florida National Scenic Trail also runs through parts of the forest.

== History ==
The state purchased the forest's first 7,146 acres (2,892 ha) in 1995 using Preservation 2000 bond funds through the Conservation and Recreation Lands program.

== See also ==
- List of Florida state forests
- List of Florida state parks
