= Florida State Road 238 =

State highway in Florida, United States

State Road 238
- SR 238 highlighted in red

Route information
- Maintained by FDOT
- Length: 15.459 mi (24.879 km)

Major junctions
- West end: US 41 / US 441 at Ellisville
- East end: SR 100 / SR 231 / CR 238 in Lake Butler

Location
- Country: United States
- State: Florida

Highway system
- Florida State Highway System; Interstate; US; State; Former; Pre‑1945; Toll; Scenic
← SR 235	→ SR 243

State Road 238 (SR 238) is a state highway in Union and Columbia counties in Florida. It is 15 miles (24 km) long from U.S. Route 41-441 at Ellisville, Columbia County to State Road 100 in Lake Butler, carrying only 0.1 miles (0.2 km) of State Road 231. The entire route of SR 238 is only 2 lanes wide. Oddly, it slightly heads north–south on its way to Lake Butler.

== Route description ==
Starting at US 41-441 near Interstate 75 as Yukon Street, it is in Columbia County for 1 and a half miles. Next, it crosses a bridge over the Olustee Creek, one of the rivers in the Suwannee River basin and enters Union County. It first intersects County Road 245, then County Road 241, then County Road 791, and finally County Road 239. The road becomes Southwest Second Street upon entering the city limits and county seat, of Lake Butler, then turns north at the intersection with State Road 231 at Southwest Sixth Avenue. SW 2nd Street continues as a city street for two more blocks to Southwest Fourth Avenue. It travels north 0.1 miles (0.2 km) serving as the western terminus of the Palatka-Lake Butler State Trail before ending at State Road 100. It becomes County Road 238 after State Road 100.

== Major intersections ==
County	Location	mi	km	Destinations	Notes
Columbia	Ellisville	0.000	0.000	US 41 / US 441 (SR 25) – High Springs, Lake City	
Union		2.254	3.627	CR 245	
Union	Providence	2.979	4.794	Southwest 44th Avenue	former SR 245 south
Union	Providence	3.471	5.586	CR 241 north	
Union		4.260	6.856	CR 791 south	
Union		5.254	8.455	CR 241 south – Alachua	
Union		6.404	10.306	CR 238A south	
Union		7.819	12.583	CR 239	
Union		10.421	16.771	CR 796A south	
Union	Lake Butler	15.323	24.660	SR 231 south (Southwest 6th Avenue)	
Union	Lake Butler	15.459	24.879	SR 100 (West Main Street) / CR 238 north (Northwest 6th Avenue) – Lake City, Starke	
1.000 mi = 1.609 km; 1.000 km = 0.621 mi

== County Road 238 ==
County Road 238
- Location: Lake Butler

County Road 238 is a county road that is 9 miles (14 km) long from Lake Butler to County Road 229 near Baker County. It is accessible to Lake Butler from the north. There are no main junctions on this route.
