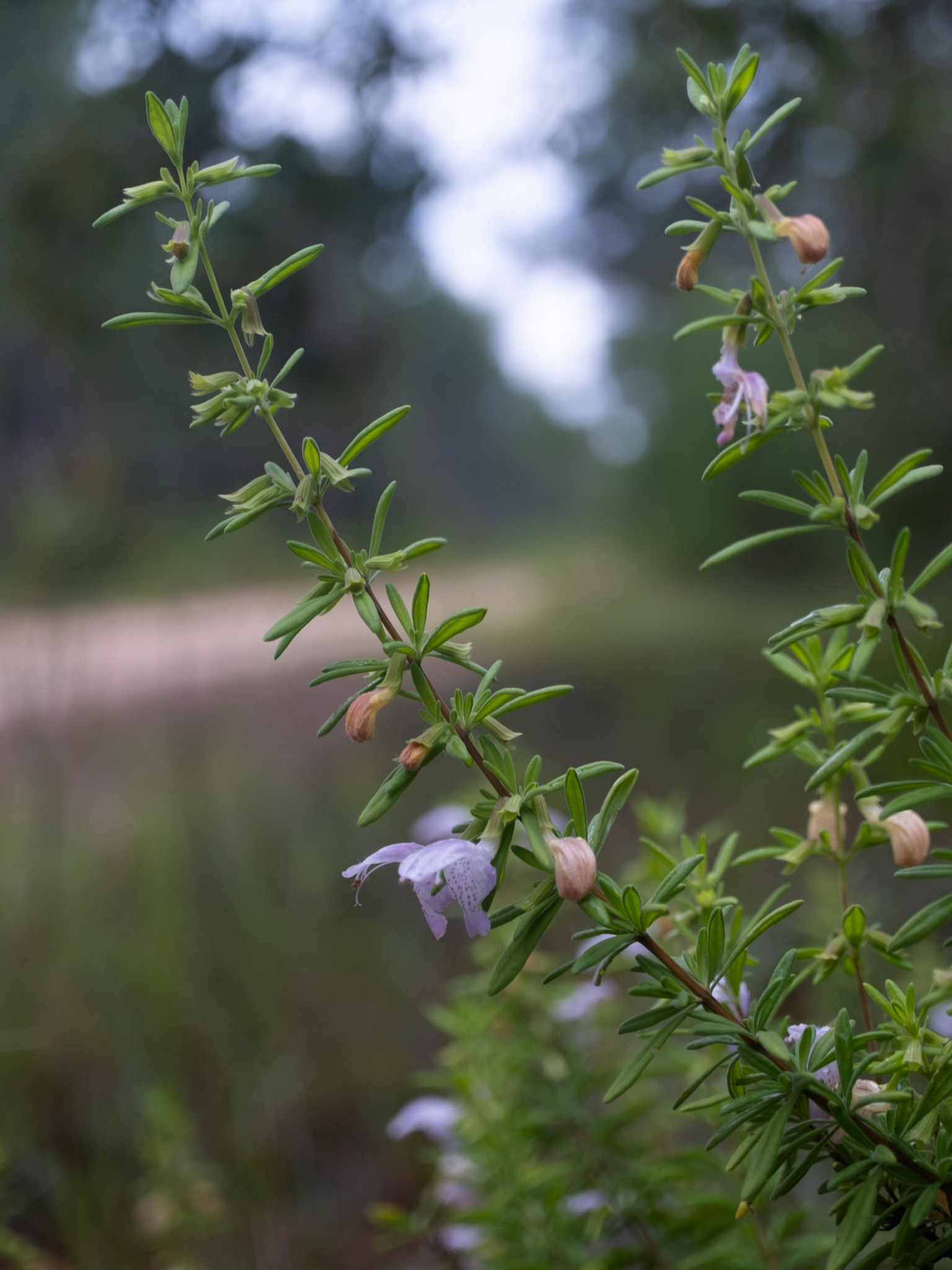

Conservation status
- Critically Imperiled (NatureServe)

- Endangered (ESA)

Scientific classification
- Kingdom: Plantae
- Clade: Tracheophytes
- Clade: Angiosperms
- Clade: Eudicots
- Clade: Asterids
- Order: Lamiales
- Family: Lamiaceae
- Genus: Conradina
- Species: C. etonia

Binomial name
- Conradina etonia Kral & McCartney

= Conradina etonia =

Species of flowering plant

Conradina etonia is a rare species of shrub in the mint family known by the common name Etonia rosemary. Endemic to Putnam County, Florida, it is known from about 8 populations on Etoniah Creek State Forest containing fewer than 1,000 total individuals. It has a specific habitat requirement and the main threat it faces is destruction and degradation of its habitat. It is a federally listed endangered species of the United States.

== Characteristics ==
An aromatic, branching shrub, it reaches 1.5 meters in maximum height. The leaves have hairy, veiny, glandular blades with rolled edges. The inflorescence is a cluster of several double-lipped lavender flowers marked with darker streaks and dots. They are attractive to bees and butterflies.

== Habitat ==
A member of the Florida scrub ecosystem, it is found alongside sand pines (Pinus clausa), scrub palmetto (Sabal etonia), oaks (Quercus spp.), and wild blueberries (Vaccinium spp.). It is part of the vegetation that is home to the federally threatened Florida scrub jay (Aphelocoma coeleruscens).

== Endangered status ==
Discovered in 1990, it was described to science as a new species in 1991. In 1993 it was added to the endangered species list because it was known from only two locations and both were slated for development. Much of the land was subsequently purchased by the State of Florida, and when more occurrences of the plant were found, the state purchased many of them as well; these lands are mainly located within Etoniah Creek State Forest and Dunns Creek State Park. The state is still attempting to purchase any private land that contains the plant. As do many other Florida scrub plant species, this shrub suffers from lack of the habitat's natural fire regime. It does not tolerate shade and requires open areas to thrive. When fires are prevented in the habitat, it eventually becomes overgrown with brush and tall, woody vegetation that shades out the smaller plants. The plant has been shown to benefit from thinning of the forest as sand pines are harvested. Controlled burns may become part of the recovery and management plans if research indicates them.

The majority of populations occur on protected land today. In 1994, the Fish and Wildlife Service recommended the species be downlisted to threatened status, but a 2018 recovery plan amendment maintained the species' endangered status.
