= List of county roads in Union County, Florida =

- County road shields used in Florida

Highway names
- Interstates: Interstate X (I-X)
- US Highways: U.S. Highway X (US X)
- State: State Road X (SR X)
- County: County Road X (CR X)

System links
- County roads in Florida; County roads in Union County

The following is a list of county roads in Union County, Florida. All county roads are maintained by the county in which they reside.

== County roads in Union County ==
Route	Road Name(s)	From	To	Notes
CR 18		Columbia-Union County Line	SR 121	former SR 18
CR 18A		SR 121 & CR 239A	SR 18	former SR 18A
CR 100A		SR 100	CR 231	former SR 231A
CR 125		SR 121	Union-Bradford County Line	former SR 125
CR 199		SR 16	CR 125	former SR 199
CR 229		Baker-Union County Line	Union-Bradford County Line	former SR 229
CR 231		Bradford-Union County Line	SR 231	former SR 231
CR 231		SR 100	Union-Baker County Line	former SR 231
CR 231A		SR 121	CR 231	former SR 231A
CR 237				former SR 237
CR 238		SRs 100 & SR 238	CR 229	former SR 238
CR 238A		SR 238	CR 18	former SR 238A
CR 239		CR 18	SR 100	former SR 239
CR 239A				former SR 239A
CR 239B		CR 239	Oak Grove Cemetery	former SR 239
CR 240		Columbia-Union County Line	CR 240	former SR 240
CR 241		Alachua-Union County Line	Columbia-Union County Line	former SR 241; Brief gap at SR 238
CR 241A		CR 791	CR 241	former SR 241A
CR 245	Price Creek Road	CR 791	Union-Columbia County Line	former SR 241A and SR 245
CR 791		CR 18	SR 238	former SR 791
CR 793				former SR 793
CR 796		CR 238A	SR 121 & CR 231A	former SR 796
CR 796A		CR 796	SR 238	former SR 796A
