= Bimini, Florida =

Unincorporated community in Florida, U.S.

Coordinates: 29°28′56″N 81°21′21″W

Bimini is an unincorporated community in Flagler County, Florida, United States. It is located west of Bunnell on State Road 100. The community is part of the Deltona–Daytona Beach–Ormond Beach, Florida metropolitan statistical area.
