= Espanola, Florida =

Unincorporated community in Florida, U.S.

Espanola is an unincorporated community in Flagler County, Florida, United States. It is located at the intersection of Old Brick Road, County Road 13, and County Road 205. It is part of the Deltona–Daytona Beach–Ormond Beach, FL metropolitan statistical area.

== Geography ==
Espanola is located at 29°30′25″N 81°18′35″W.
