= Palatka–Lake Butler State Trail =

State Trail in Florida, United States

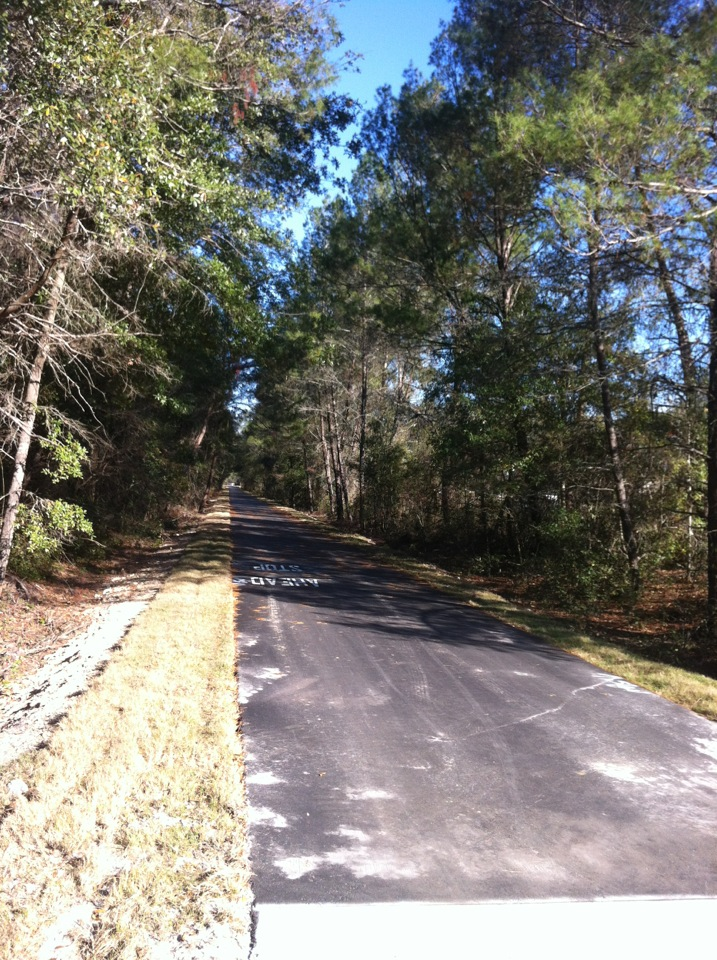
- View of the trail looking east from the Florahome post office.

- Location within Florida Location within the United States
- Interactive map of Palatka–Lake Butler State Trail
- Location: Union, Bradford, Clay and Putnam counties, Florida, USA
- Nearest city: Palatka, Florida
- Coordinates: 29°44′17″N 81°52′45″W
- Area: 611.27 acres (247.37 ha)
- Established: December 21, 2007; 19 years ago
- Governing body: Florida Department of Environmental Protection
- Length: 47 mi (76 km)
- Trailheads: Lake Butler; Brooker; Lake Sampson; Hampton; Twin Lakes; Putnam Hall; Grandin; Florahome; Palatka
- Use: Hiking/Biking/Horses/Rollerblading
- Season: Year round
- Hazards: Abandoned sand mines, unpaved segments, swampland

The Palatka–Lake Butler State Trail (PLB) corridor stretches nearly 47 miles (76 km) from the vicinity of Lake Butler, Florida to Palatka, Florida. The project is located along the former Georgia Southern and Florida Railway right-of-way and the trail is being constructed on top of the existing abandoned railroad bed through (from east to west) Putnam, Clay, Bradford, and Union counties.

The corridor was purchased with Preservation 2000 funds through the Office of Greenways and Trails Acquisition Program. The Rails to Trails Conservancy played a key role in preserving the corridor for conversion to a rail-trail and the trail was designated as part of the Florida Greenways & Trails System in 2007.

Construction of a 12-foot-wide (3.7 m) multi-use recreational trail along this corridor is being completed in phases, and the first paved section of 5.2 miles (8.4 km) opened in Clay County in 2008. The paved trail now runs from western Keystone Heights through and past Florahome through the southern edges of the Etoniah Creek State Forest.

The eastern end of the pavement is diagonally west of the Kay Larkin Airport in Palatka. The construction was administered by the Florida Department of Transportation (FDOT) and funded in part through the Transportation Equity Act of the 21st Century Act (TEA-21). The Trail is managed by the DEP Office of Greenways & Trails.

The Clay County segment of the PLB Trail running through Keystone Heights ties into a 10-foot-wide (3.0 m), 5.5-mile-long bike path (8.9 km) the FDOT constructed. This bike path runs north from downtown Keystone Heights to Mike Roess Gold Head Branch State Park. Twin Lakes Park in Keystone Heights serves as the main trailhead for the Clay County segment and was developed by Clay County with funding from the Florida Recreation Development Assistance Program.

The remainder of the PLB Trail is still in the design phase. The final design must be completed before any additional paving can occur and the 47-mile (76 km) recreational trail is fully constructed. There are plans to connect St. Augustine to Lake City by way of this trail system at some future date, to make the total length of the Trail over 100 miles (160 km).

A section of the 1,400-mile (2,300 km) Florida National Scenic Trail is being developed adjacent to the PLB Trail.

== Gallery ==
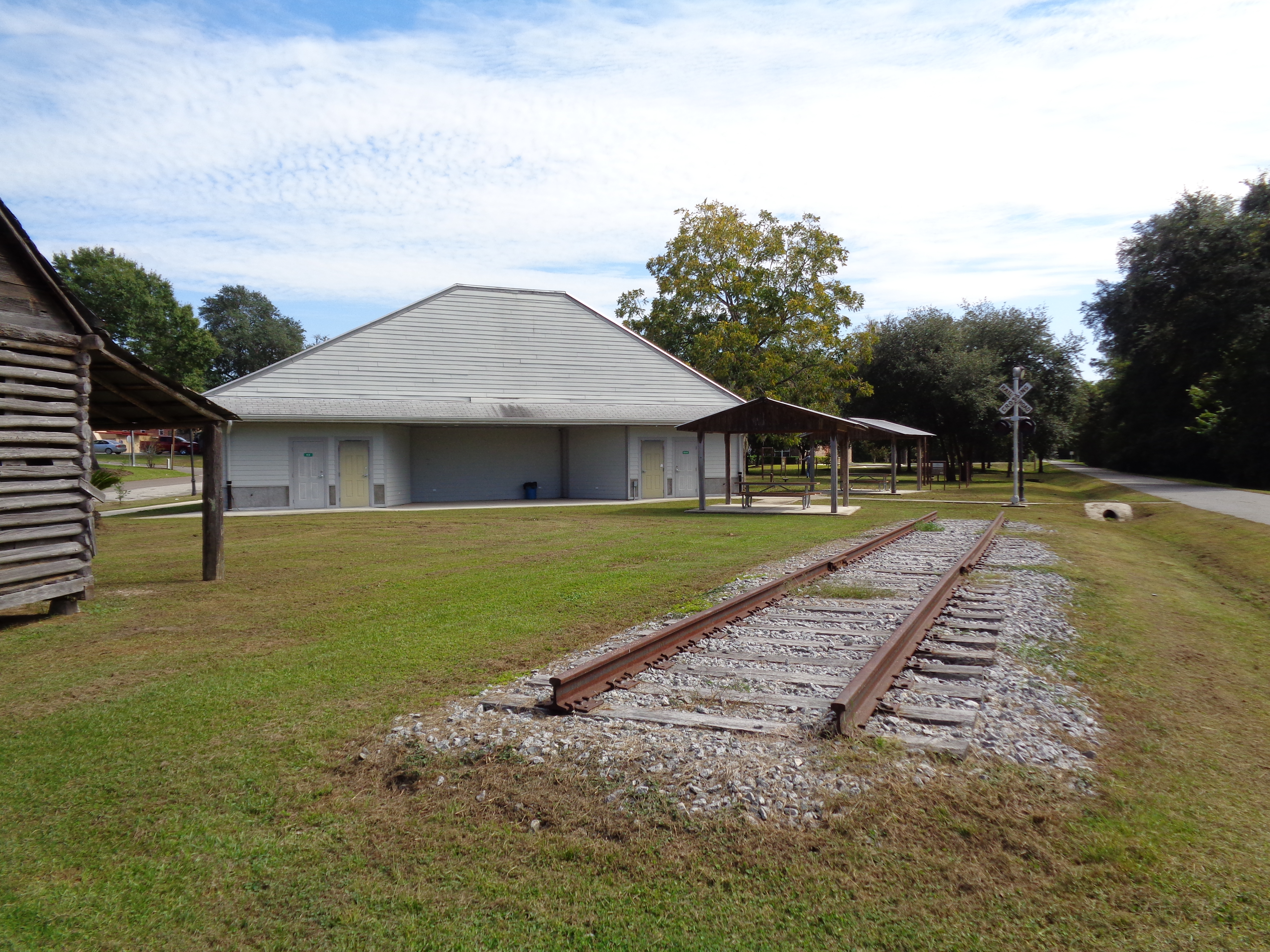
The former Lake Bulter Union Depot next to the trail.

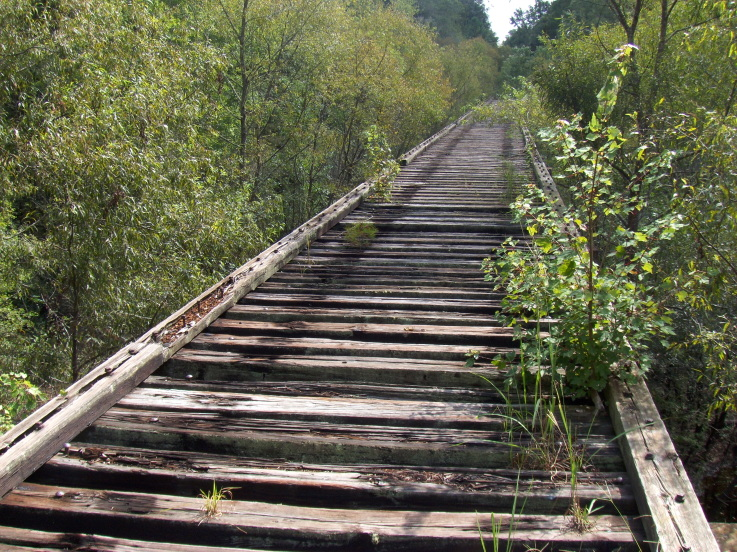
Old railroad trestle over the New River, future route of Palatka-Lake Butler State Trail as well as the Florida National Scenic Trail.

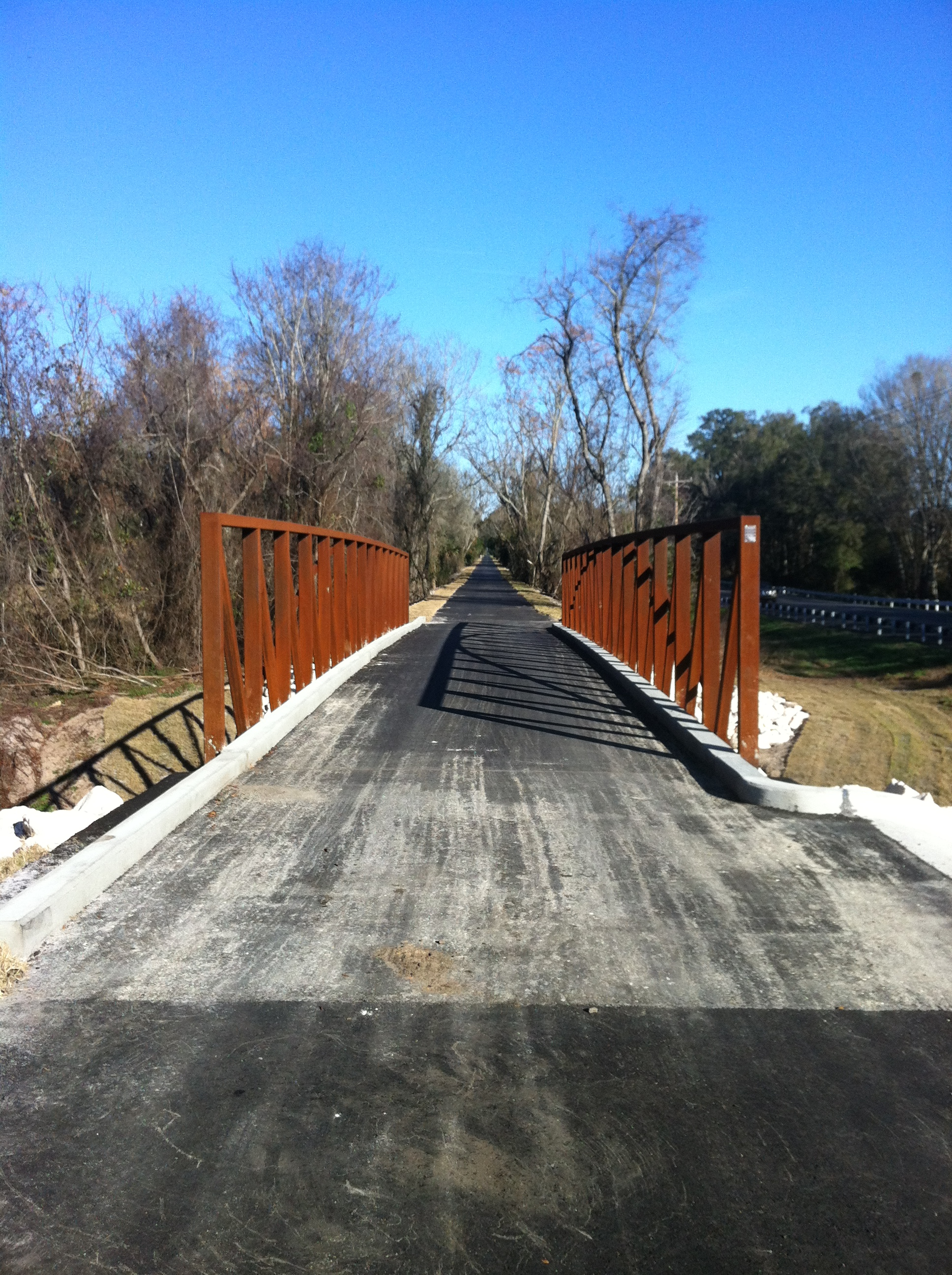
Trail bridge on the Palatka-Lake Butler State Trail west of Florahome.

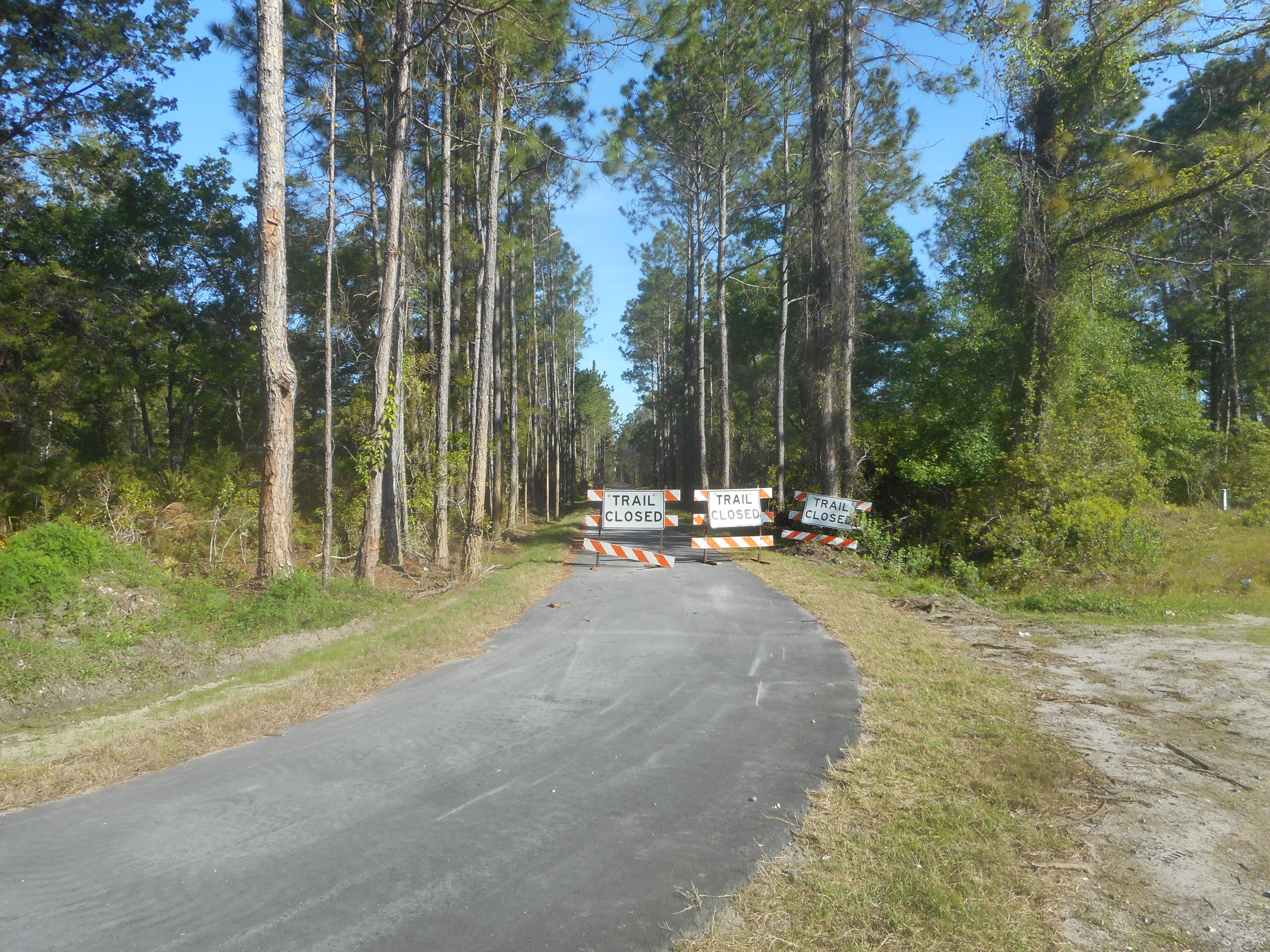
Newly paved (as of March 2023) section along SR 100 west of Keystone Heights.
