= Florahome, Florida =

- unincorporated community
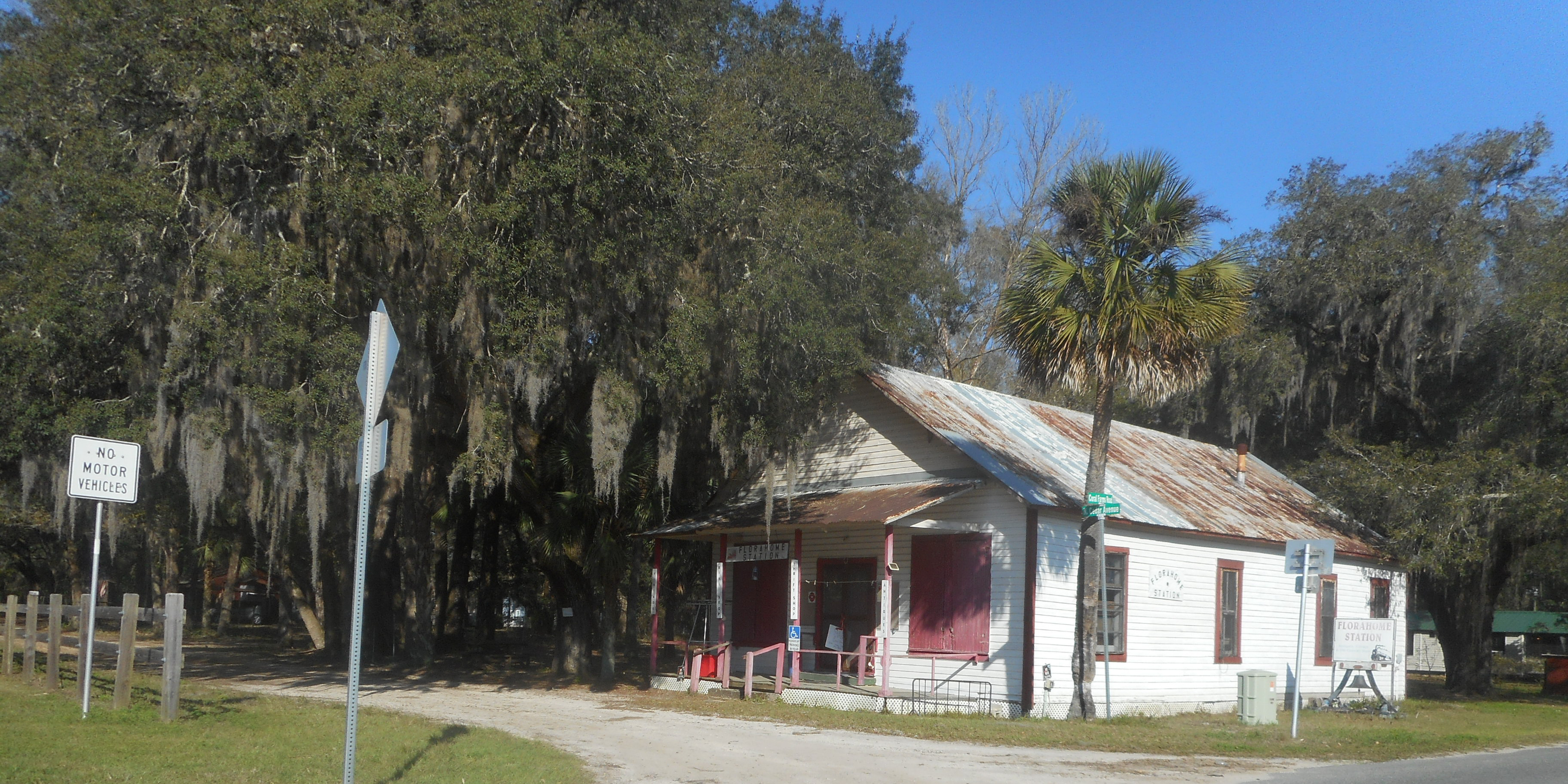
- Florahome's former railroad station on Coral Farms Road, now an antique shop.
- Interactive map of Florahome, Florida
- Country: United States
- State: Florida
- County: Putnam
- Elevation: 125 ft (38 m)
- ZIP code: 32140
- GNIS ID: 282583

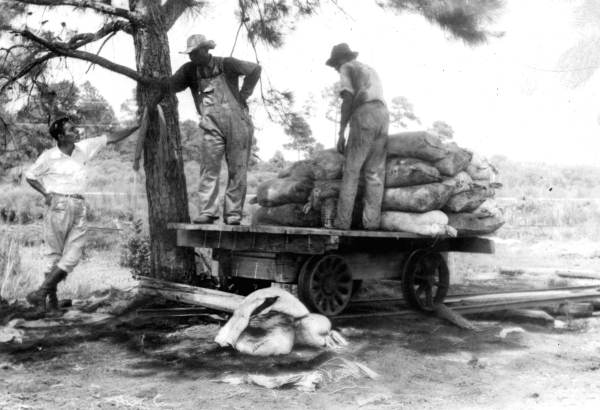
Pulverized peat in bags loaded on tram cars, Florahome, 1944

Florahome is an unincorporated community in Putnam County, Florida, United States, located on State Road 100. The town was established in 1899 by the Georgia Southern and Florida Railway. The streets are laid in a grid system. Streets north and south are named for trees or shrubs. Streets east and west are named for states or provinces. Early in the town's history, it was surrounded by swamps. These were drained when canals were dredged by the Etoniah Canal and Drainage Company. Florahome was also once an island and was drained of all its water to make way for crops, animals, and homes. The town is built upon a sandy hill rising from the swampy areas.

Florahome has a specific zip code (32140), which covers an area of 43.24 square miles and claimed a population of 1,471 according to the 2010 census.

The Naked Jungle (1954) second-unit stock footage was shot in Florahome.

== Geography ==
Florahome is located at 29°43′58″N 81°53′00″W.
