= Graham, Florida =

- Unincorporated community
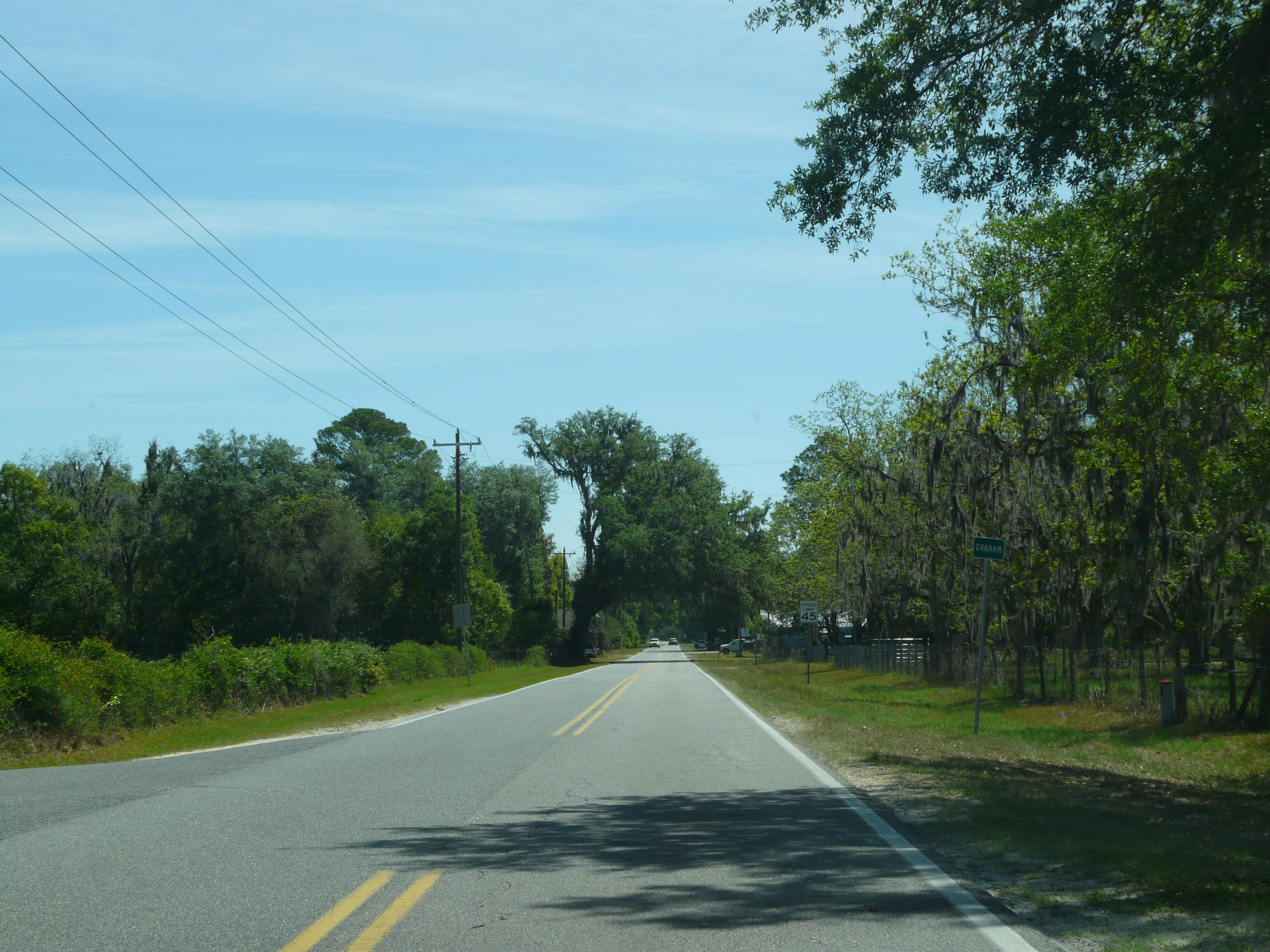
- Entering Graham on County Road 18

- Location within Florida
- Coordinates: 29°51′37″N 82°13′06″W
- Country: United States
- State: Florida
- County: Bradford
- Elevation: 141 ft (43 m)
- Time zone: UTC-5 (Eastern (EST))
  - Summer (DST): UTC-4 (EDT)
- ZIP code: 32042
- Area code: 904
- GNIS feature ID: 283263

Graham is an unincorporated community in Bradford County, Florida, United States. Graham is located 8.7 miles (14.0 km) southwest of Starke. Graham has a post office with ZIP code 32042, which opened on December 4, 1901.
