= Bradford County, Florida =

County in Florida, United States

- County
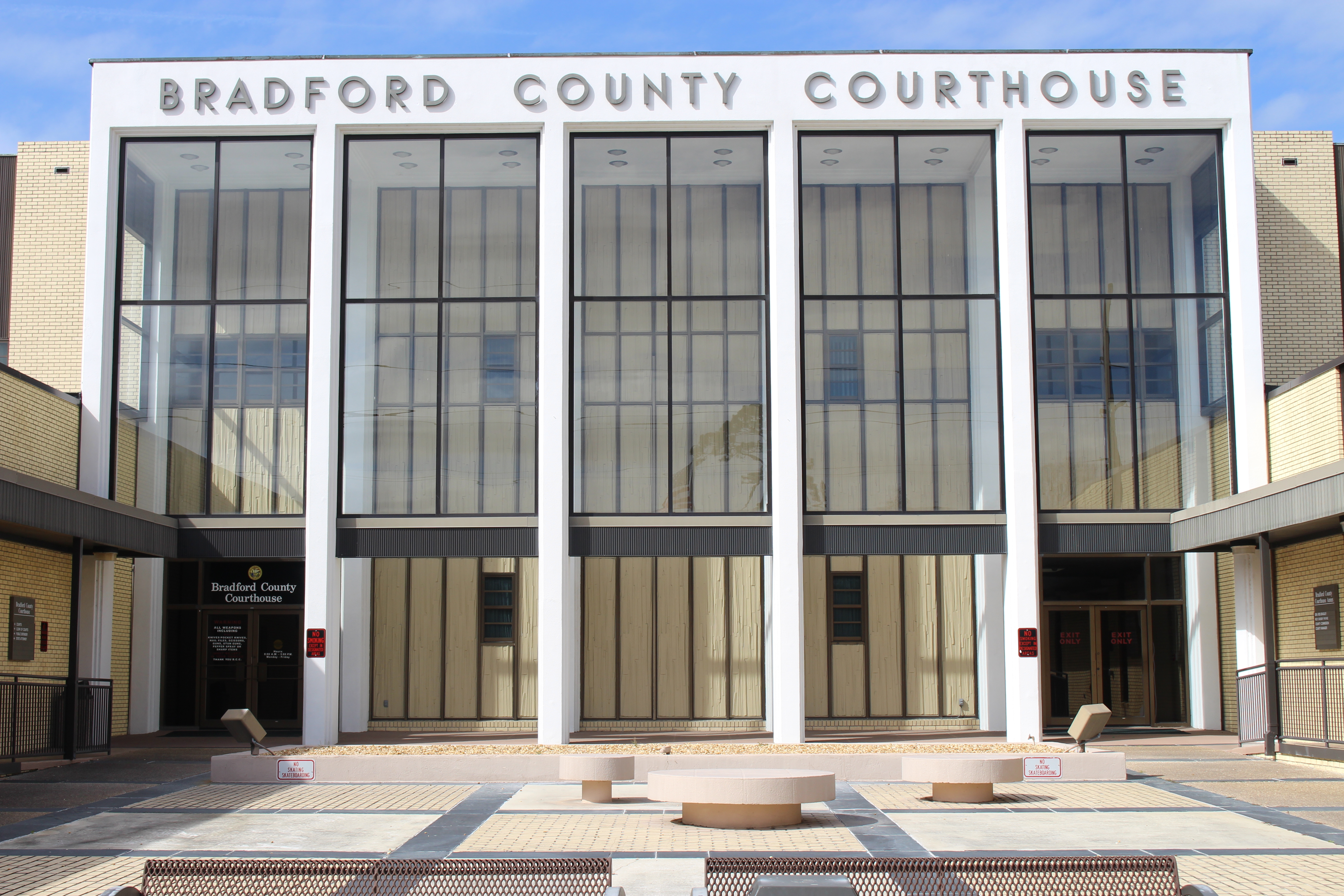
- Bradford County Courthouse

- Seal

- Location within the U.S. state of Florida
- Coordinates: 29°57′N 82°10′W
- Country: United States
- State: Florida
- Founded: December 31, 1858
- Seat: Starke
- Largest city: Starke

Area
  - Total: 300 sq mi (780 km^{2})
  - Land: 294 sq mi (760 km^{2})
  - Water: 6.5 sq mi (17 km^{2}) 2.2%

Population (2020)
  - Total: 28,303
  - Estimate (2025): 28,307 ▲
  - Density: 91/sq mi (35/km^{2})
- Time zone: UTC−5 (Eastern)
  - Summer (DST): UTC−4 (EDT)
- Congressional district: 3rd
- Website: www.bradfordcountyfl.gov

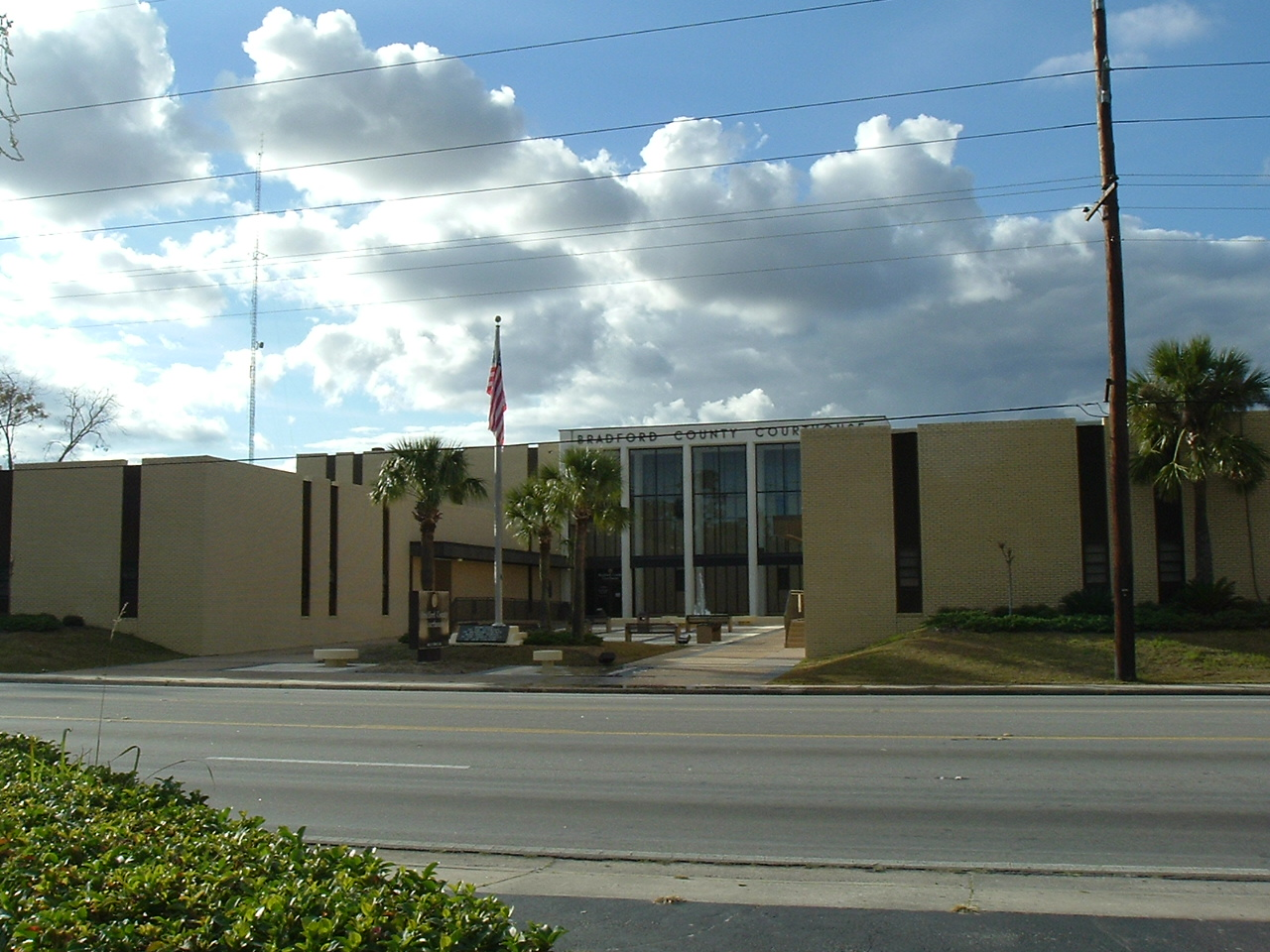
Bradford County Courthouse in Starke

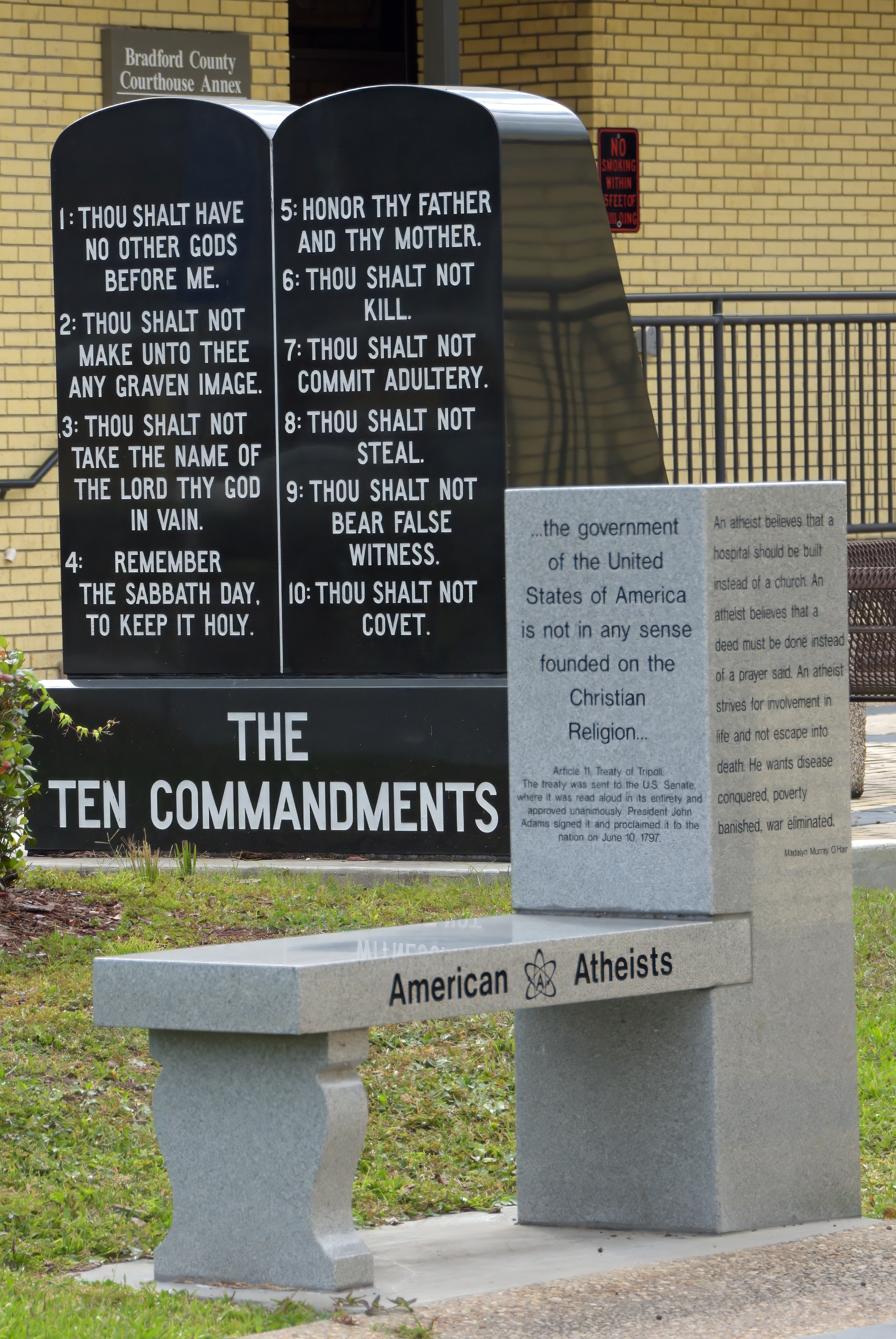
American Atheists bench and Ten Commandments display at the courthouse

Bradford County is a county in the north central region of the U.S. state of Florida. As of the 2020 census, the population was 28,303. Its county seat and largest city is Starke. The Florida State Prison is located in an unincorporated part of the county.

== History ==
New River County, as it was known at the time, was created in 1858 from segments of Columbia and Alachua counties. It was renamed Bradford County in 1861 in honor of Confederate Captain Richard Bradford, who fought in the American Civil War and was killed in the Battle of Santa Rosa Island, becoming the first officer from Florida to die during the Civil War.

During the county's early history, Lake Butler served as the county seat. However, the growth of Starke as an important city on the Fernandina to Cedar Key railroad led to an 1875 vote on the location of the county seat, with Starke winning by 46 votes. A successful legal challenge brought the county seat back to Lake Butler, and an 1885 referendum reaffirmed the move by 19 votes.

Yet another referendum was held in 1887, and saw the courthouse and county seat moved back to Starke, where it would remain. The dispute brought on the attention of the Florida Legislature, and in 1921, the western portion of Bradford County and Lake Butler were separated to form Union County.

The county was home to numerous citrus farms in its early days prior to the Great Freeze in the winter of 1894–1895. Even after the freeze, Starke and Lawtey continued to be major regional agricultural producers, with the primary exports being cotton, tobacco, and strawberries.

Significant growth would come to the county during the World War II era, with the construction of U.S. Route 301 and nearby Camp Blanding.

Post-war, the county saw the construction of Florida State Prison on the Bradford-Union County line in Raiford, along with several moments in the national media spotlight. Ted Bundy was executed at the prison in 1989, while Starke and Bradford County faced a series lawsuits in the 2000s over a cross on the city's water tower and a Ten Commandments statue in front of the county courthouse.

== Geography ==
According to the U.S. Census Bureau, the county has a total area of 300 square miles (780 km^{2}), of which 294 square miles (760 km^{2}) is land and 6.5 square miles (17 km^{2}) (2.2%) is water. It is the third-smallest county in Florida by land area and second-smallest by total area.

=== Adjacent counties ===
- Baker County, Florida - north
- Clay County, Florida - east
- Putnam County, Florida - southeast
- Alachua County, Florida - south
- Union County, Florida - west
- Duval County, Florida - northeast

=== National protected area ===
- Osceola National Forest (part)

=== Transportation ===
Bradford County does not have any interstate connections; the nearest connection is with I-75 to the west of the county.

- US 301
- SR 16
- SR 18
- SR 21
- SR 100
- SR 200
- SR 230
- SR 231
- SR 235

Bradford County's main railroad line is the CSX Wildwood Subdivision. Along this line within Starke, Wannee Junction serves as the northeastern terminus of the CSX Brooker Subdivision. One notable major rail trail is the Palatka-Lake Butler State Trail, which used to be the main line for the Georgia Southern and Florida Railway.

The county shares Keystone Heights Airport with neighboring Clay County. The nearest regional airport is Gainesville Regional Airport, and the nearest international airport is Jacksonville International Airport.

== Demographics ==
Historical population
| Census | Pop. | Note | %± |
|---|---|---|---|
| 1860 | 3,820 | | — |
| 1870 | 3,671 | | −3.9% |
| 1880 | 6,112 | | 66.5% |
| 1890 | 7,516 | | 23.0% |
| 1900 | 10,295 | | 37.0% |
| 1910 | 14,090 | | 36.9% |
| 1920 | 12,503 | | −11.3% |
| 1930 | 9,405 | | −24.8% |
| 1940 | 8,717 | | −7.3% |
| 1950 | 11,457 | | 31.4% |
| 1960 | 12,446 | | 8.6% |
| 1970 | 14,625 | | 17.5% |
| 1980 | 20,023 | | 36.9% |
| 1990 | 22,515 | | 12.4% |
| 2000 | 26,088 | | 15.9% |
| 2010 | 28,520 | | 9.3% |
| 2020 | 28,303 | | −0.8% |
| 2025 (est.) | 28,307 | ▲ | 0.0% |
U.S. Decennial Census; 1790-1960 1900-1990; 1990-2000 2010-2015

=== 2020 census ===
As of the 2020 census, the county had a population of 28,303 and 5,882 families. The median age was 41.7 years, 18.8% of residents were under the age of 18, and 18.7% of residents were 65 years of age or older. For every 100 females there were 126.7 males, and for every 100 females age 18 and over there were 132.7 males age 18 and over.

The racial makeup of the county was 73.9% White, 19.4% Black or African American, 0.3% American Indian and Alaska Native, 0.5% Asian, 0.1% Native Hawaiian and Pacific Islander, 1.7% from some other race, and 4.1% from two or more races. Hispanic or Latino residents of any race comprised 4.8% of the population.

29.3% of residents lived in urban areas, while 70.7% lived in rural areas.

There were 9,462 households in the county, of which 30.2% had children under the age of 18 living in them. Of all households, 46.1% were married-couple households, 18.8% were households with a male householder and no spouse or partner present, and 28.6% were households with a female householder and no spouse or partner present. About 25.2% of all households were made up of individuals and 12.7% had someone living alone who was 65 years of age or older.

There were 10,723 housing units, of which 11.8% were vacant. Among occupied housing units, 74.5% were owner-occupied and 25.5% were renter-occupied. The homeowner vacancy rate was 1.4% and the rental vacancy rate was 7.9%.

=== Racial and ethnic composition ===
Bradford County, Florida – Racial and ethnic composition Note: the US Census treats Hispanic/Latino as an ethnic category. This table excludes Latinos from the racial categories and assigns them to a separate category. Hispanics/Latinos may be of any race.
| Race / Ethnicity (NH = Non-Hispanic) | Pop 1980 | Pop 1990 | Pop 2000 | Pop 2010 | Pop 2020 | % 1980 | % 1990 | % 2000 | % 2010 | % 2020 |
|---|---|---|---|---|---|---|---|---|---|---|
| White alone (NH) | 15,621 | 17,406 | 19,559 | 21,066 | 20,320 | 78.02% | 77.31% | 74.97% | 73.86% | 71.79% |
| Black or African American alone (NH) | 4,016 | 4,505 | 5,367 | 5,777 | 5,427 | 20.06% | 20.01% | 20.57% | 20.26% | 19.17% |
| Native American or Alaska Native alone (NH) | 35 | 74 | 82 | 85 | 58 | 0.17% | 0.33% | 0.31% | 0.30% | 0.20% |
| Asian alone (NH) | 59 | 98 | 154 | 149 | 135 | 0.29% | 0.44% | 0.59% | 0.52% | 0.48% |
| Native Hawaiian or Pacific Islander alone (NH) | x | x | 21 | 11 | 12 | x | x | 0.08% | 0.04% | 0.04% |
| Other race alone (NH) | 39 | 6 | 24 | 26 | 97 | 0.19% | 0.03% | 0.09% | 0.09% | 0.34% |
| Mixed race or Multiracial (NH) | x | x | 259 | 386 | 904 | x | x | 0.99% | 1.35% | 3.19% |
| Hispanic or Latino (any race) | 253 | 426 | 622 | 1,020 | 1,350 | 1.26% | 1.89% | 2.38% | 3.58% | 4.77% |
| Total | 20,023 | 22,515 | 26,088 | 28,520 | 28,303 | 100.00% | 100.00% | 100.00% | 100.00% | 100.00% |

A map of the racial demographics in Bradford County, Florida by Census tract. Legend: Non-Hispanic White 50–60% 60–70% 80–90% >90%

=== 2000 census ===
At the 2000 census there were 26,088 people, 8,497 households, and 6,194 families in the county. The population density was 89 people per square mile (34 people/km^{2}). There were 9,605 housing units at an average density of 33 per square mile (13/km^{2}). The racial makeup of the county was 76.28% White, 20.79% Black or African American, 0.34% Native American, 0.61% Asian, 0.10% Pacific Islander, 0.65% from other races, and 1.24% from two or more races. 2.38% of the population were Hispanic or Latino of any race.

Of the 8,497 households 31.90% had children under the age of 18 living with them, 55.40% were married couples living together, 13.30% had a female householder with no husband present, and 27.10% were non-families. 22.90% of households were one person and 9.70% were one person aged 65 or older. The average household size was 2.58 and the average family size was 3.01.

The age distribution was 21.90% under the age of 18, 9.50% from 18 to 24, 32.10% from 25 to 44, 23.50% from 45 to 64, and 12.90% 65 or older. The median age was 37 years. For every 100 females there were 127.00 males. For every 100 females age 18 and over, there were 132.50 males.

The median household income was $33,140 and the median family income was $39,123. Males had a median income of $29,494 versus $20,745 for females. The per capita income for the county was $14,226. About 11.10% of families and 14.60% of the population were below the poverty line, including 18.30% of those under age 18 and 17.60% of those age 65 or over.

== Infrastructure ==
The Florida Department of Corrections operates several correctional facilities in unincorporated areas. The facilities include Florida State Prison, Florida State Prison – West Unit, and New River Correctional Institution. Florida State Prison houses one of Florida's two male death rows and the State of Florida execution chamber.

== Government and politics ==
=== County government ===
Bradford County elects the county constitutional officers required by the Florida Constitution: sheriff, tax collector, property appraiser, supervisor of elections, and clerk of the circuit court. It also elects the county superintendent of schools. County commissioners are elected from single-member districts.

==== Countywide officials ====
Bradford County elected officials
| Office | Officeholder | Party | Current term ends |
|---|---|---|---|
| Sheriff | Gordon Smith | Republican | 2028 |
| Clerk of the Court | Denny Thompson | Republican | 2028 |
| Property Appraiser | Kenny Clark | No Party Affiliation | 2028 |
| Supervisor of Elections | Amanda Seyfang | Republican | 2028 |
| Tax Collector | Teresa Phillips | Republican | 2028 |
| Superintendent of Schools | Will Hartley | Republican | 2028 |

==== County commission ====
Bradford County Board of County Commissioners
| District | Commissioner | Party | Current term ends |
|---|---|---|---|
| 1 | Carolyn Brown Spooner | Democratic | 2028 |
| 2 | Kenny Thompson | Republican | 2026 |
| 3 | Chris Dougherty | Republican | 2028 |
| 4 | Danny Riddick | Republican | 2026 |
| 5 | Diane Andrews | Republican | 2028 |

=== Voter registration ===
According to the Secretary of State's office, Republicans account for a majority of registered voters in Bradford County.

Bradford County Voter Registration & Party Enrollment as of 31 July 2022
| Political Party | Total Voters | Percentage |
|---|---|---|
| Democratic | 4,985 | 27.91% |
| Republican | 9,922 | 55.56% |
| Independent | 2,769 | 15.50% |
| Third Parties | 181 | 1.01% |
| Total | 17,857 | 100% |

=== State and local elections ===
For most of its history, Bradford County voted heavily Democratic at the local, state, and federal level. The county flipped at the Presidential level for the last time in 1984, and has voted heavily Republican in presidential and congressional races since. In 2015, Republicans overtook Democrats for the first time in registration advantage, and by 2018, nearly all county offices had flipped to the Republican Party.

United States presidential election results for Bradford County, Florida
| Year | Republican | | Democratic | | Third party(ies) | |
| Year | No. | % | No. | % | No. | % |
|---|---|---|---|---|---|---|
| 1904 | 124 | 15.54% | 633 | 79.32% | 41 | 5.14% |
| 1908 | 180 | 18.35% | 729 | 74.31% | 72 | 7.34% |
| 1912 | 95 | 11.09% | 656 | 76.55% | 106 | 12.37% |
| 1916 | 153 | 10.28% | 1,302 | 87.44% | 34 | 2.28% |
| 1920 | 248 | 15.40% | 1,269 | 78.82% | 93 | 5.78% |
| 1924 | 94 | 14.24% | 539 | 81.67% | 27 | 4.09% |
| 1928 | 534 | 43.73% | 679 | 55.61% | 8 | 0.66% |
| 1932 | 210 | 13.75% | 1,317 | 86.25% | 0 | 0.00% |
| 1936 | 293 | 16.40% | 1,494 | 83.60% | 0 | 0.00% |
| 1940 | 261 | 14.12% | 1,588 | 85.88% | 0 | 0.00% |
| 1944 | 355 | 16.67% | 1,775 | 83.33% | 0 | 0.00% |
| 1948 | 357 | 16.30% | 1,228 | 56.07% | 605 | 27.63% |
| 1952 | 976 | 29.68% | 2,312 | 70.32% | 0 | 0.00% |
| 1956 | 1,203 | 34.07% | 2,328 | 65.93% | 0 | 0.00% |
| 1960 | 1,131 | 30.85% | 2,535 | 69.15% | 0 | 0.00% |
| 1964 | 1,987 | 46.13% | 2,320 | 53.87% | 0 | 0.00% |
| 1968 | 718 | 15.18% | 1,173 | 24.79% | 2,840 | 60.03% |
| 1972 | 3,652 | 73.67% | 1,217 | 24.55% | 88 | 1.78% |
| 1976 | 1,680 | 29.91% | 3,868 | 68.86% | 69 | 1.23% |
| 1980 | 2,778 | 44.50% | 3,347 | 53.61% | 118 | 1.89% |
| 1984 | 4,130 | 63.82% | 2,341 | 36.18% | 0 | 0.00% |
| 1988 | 4,221 | 63.61% | 2,386 | 35.96% | 29 | 0.44% |
| 1992 | 3,672 | 44.02% | 3,041 | 36.46% | 1,628 | 19.52% |
| 1996 | 4,039 | 48.97% | 3,356 | 40.69% | 853 | 10.34% |
| 2000 | 5,416 | 62.43% | 3,075 | 35.45% | 184 | 2.12% |
| 2004 | 7,557 | 69.62% | 3,244 | 29.88% | 54 | 0.50% |
| 2008 | 8,136 | 69.52% | 3,430 | 29.31% | 137 | 1.17% |
| 2012 | 8,219 | 70.46% | 3,325 | 28.51% | 120 | 1.03% |
| 2016 | 8,913 | 73.31% | 2,924 | 24.05% | 321 | 2.64% |
| 2020 | 10,334 | 75.71% | 3,160 | 23.15% | 156 | 1.14% |
| 2024 | 10,920 | 78.27% | 2,946 | 21.12% | 86 | 0.62% |

United States Senate election results for Bradford County, Florida1
| Year | Republican | | Democratic | | Third party(ies) | |
| Year | No. | % | No. | % | No. | % |
|---|---|---|---|---|---|---|
| 2024 | 10,363 | 76.10% | 3,005 | 22.07% | 249 | 1.83% |

United States Senate election results for Bradford County, Florida3
| Year | Republican | | Democratic | | Third party(ies) | |
| Year | No. | % | No. | % | No. | % |
|---|---|---|---|---|---|---|
| 2022 | 8,156 | 79.88% | 1,942 | 19.02% | 112 | 1.10% |

Florida Gubernatorial election results for Bradford County
| Year | Republican | | Democratic | | Third party(ies) | |
| Year | No. | % | No. | % | No. | % |
|---|---|---|---|---|---|---|
| 1960 | 326 | 9.79% | 3,003 | 90.21% | 0 | 0.00% |
| 1964 | 1,087 | 28.18% | 2,771 | 71.82% | 0 | 0.00% |
| 1966 | 1,910 | 52.75% | 1,711 | 47.25% | 0 | 0.00% |
| 1970 | 1,546 | 38.37% | 2,483 | 61.63% | 0 | 0.00% |
| 1978 | 1,678 | 36.43% | 2,928 | 63.57% | 0 | 0.00% |
| 1982 | 730 | 16.81% | 3,613 | 83.19% | 0 | 0.00% |
| 1986 | 3,321 | 58.92% | 2,315 | 41.08% | 0 | 0.00% |
| 1990 | 2,468 | 43.23% | 3,241 | 56.77% | 0 | 0.00% |
| 1994 | 4,470 | 62.85% | 2,642 | 37.15% | 0 | 0.00% |
| 1998 | 4,349 | 67.29% | 2,113 | 32.69% | 1 | 0.02% |
| 2002 | 4,596 | 58.79% | 3,135 | 40.10% | 87 | 1.11% |
| 2006 | 4,458 | 62.59% | 2,438 | 34.23% | 227 | 3.19% |
| 2010 | 4,850 | 60.06% | 2,983 | 36.94% | 242 | 3.00% |
| 2014 | 5,525 | 64.67% | 2,594 | 30.36% | 424 | 4.96% |
| 2018 | 7,698 | 73.28% | 2,671 | 25.43% | 136 | 1.29% |
| 2022 | 8,346 | 81.29% | 1,852 | 18.04% | 69 | 0.67% |

== Media ==
There is a newspaper Bradford County Telegraph. It was published by William Wyatt Moore, a Floridan and Democrat, since 1879 under Florida Telegraph. The name was changed in 1888, after I.C. Webb became the owner. Eugene S. Matthews, purchased the newspaper with Ben J. Farmer 5 year later.

== Education ==
Bradford County School District covers the entire county, and operates public schools there. Bradford High School is the county's public high school.

The main library serving Bradford County is the Bradford County Public Library in Starke. As of 2023 the library director is Robert E. Perone.

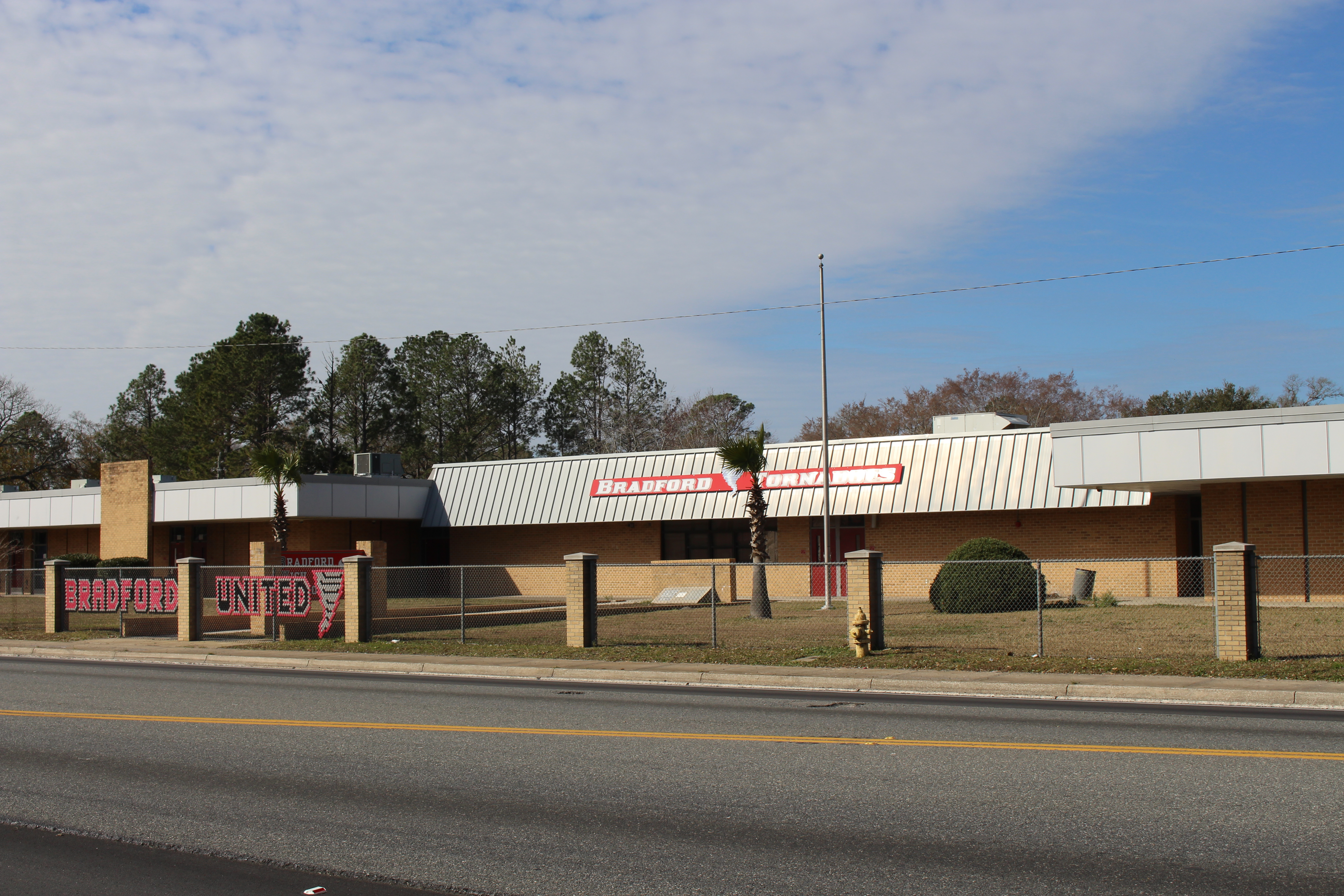
Bradford High School

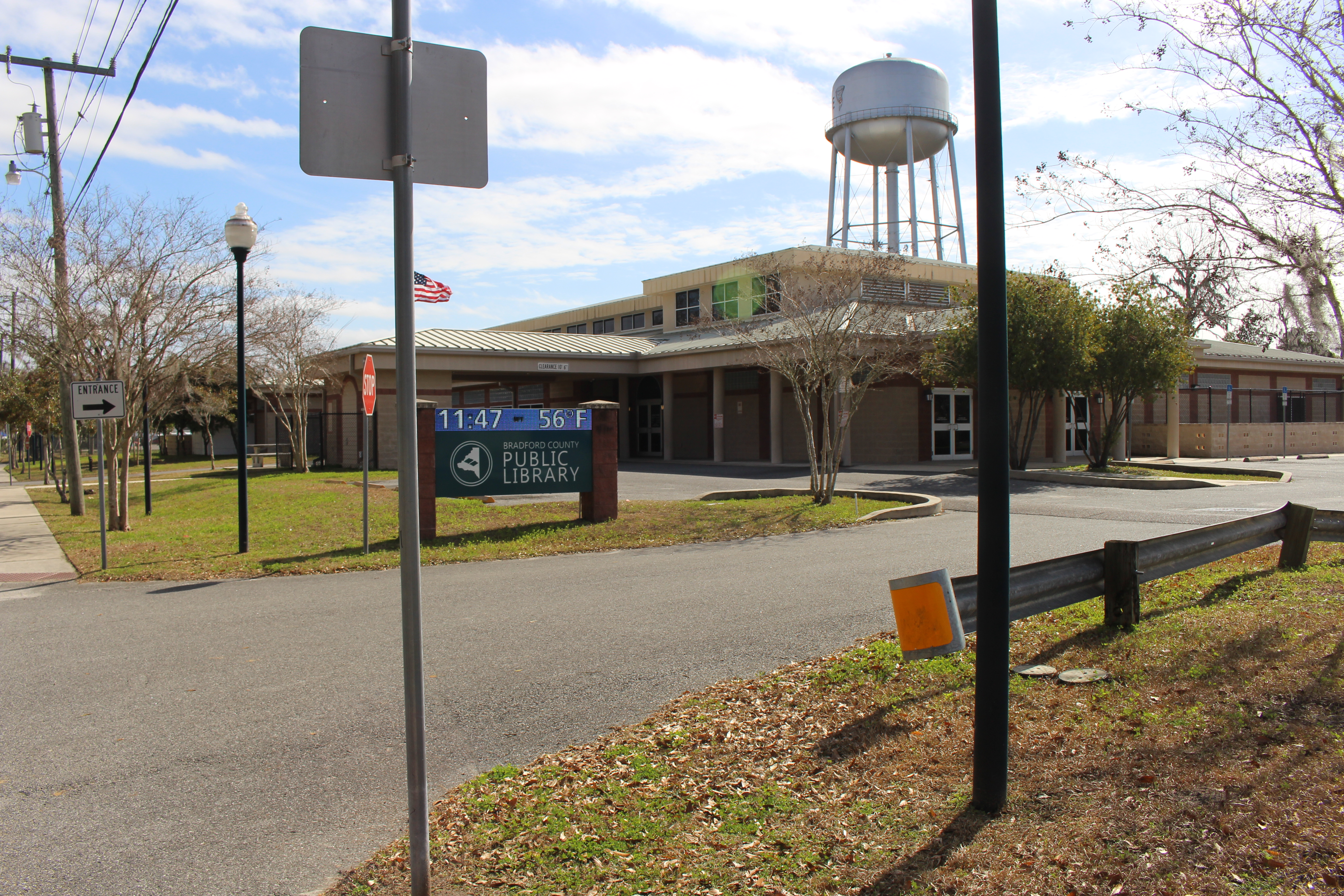
Bradford County Public Library

== Communities ==
=== Cities ===
- Hampton
- Lawtey
- Starke

=== Town ===
- Brooker

== See also ==
- National Register of Historic Places listings in Bradford County, Florida
