= Worthington Springs, Florida =

Town in the state of Florida, United States

- Town
- Town of Worthington Springs
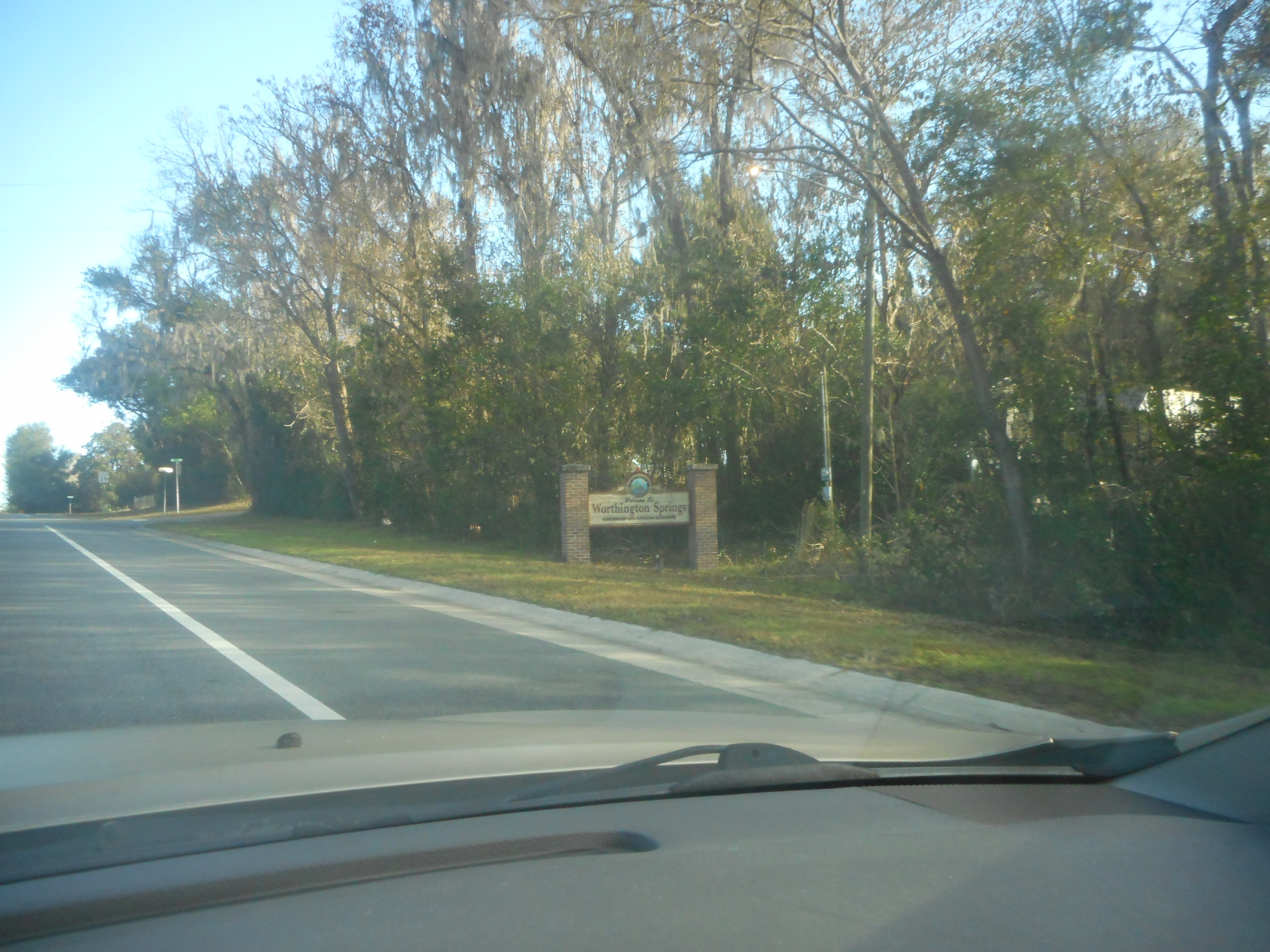
- Northbound SR 121 as it approaches a sign welcoming motorists to Worthington Springs.

- Logo
- Motto: "Gateway to Union County"
- Location in Union County and the state of Florida
- Coordinates: 29°55′59″N 82°24′54″W
- Country: United States
- State: Florida
- County: Union
- Settled: c. Late 1800s–Early 1900s
- Incorporated: 1963

Government
  - Type: Mayor-Council
  - Mayor: Joan Douglas
  - Councilors: Lee Hawkins, Ryan Clemons, Nita Elixson, Travis Hemphill, and Priscilla Kirby
  - Town Clerk: Patricia Harrell
  - Town Attorney: Niles B. Whitten

Area
  - Total: 0.97 sq mi (2.51 km^{2})
  - Land: 0.96 sq mi (2.48 km^{2})
  - Water: 0.012 sq mi (0.03 km^{2})
- Elevation: 85 ft (26 m)

Population (2020)
  - Total: 378
  - Density: 394.2/sq mi (152.22/km^{2})
- Time zone: UTC−5 (Eastern (EST))
  - Summer (DST): UTC−4 (EDT)
- ZIP code: 32697
- Area code: 386
- FIPS code: 12-78775
- GNIS feature ID: 2406919
- Website: worthingtonsprings.org

Worthington Springs is a spring and town in Union County, Florida, United States. It is part of the North Florida region. The population was 378 at the 2020 census.

== History ==
The community was named for early settler Sam Worthington, who arrived prior to the first Seminole War of 1814–1819. The mineral spring on the Santa Fe River was alleged to have medicinal benefits, attracting people from the late 1800s to the early 1900s. In the early years, swimming was segregated, with men and women assigned specific time intervals. In 1906, the new owner constructed a 12'×12' concrete box around the spring to divert water into a 90'×50' concrete pool with a wall dividing the bathing area into sections for men and women. The complex included a hotel, recreation hall and bathhouse for the spring pool.

Independence Day was always a big celebration at the springs. Thousands of people from surrounding communities would converge on the springs to picnic, swim, politic, and converse with friends and fellow Floridians. A special train transported people from Jacksonville for the holiday festivities.

An iron and timber bridge was built across the river in 1908, facilitating access to and from the south. It was replaced in 1937 with the present concrete structure. In the mid-twentieth century, the outflow from the spring declined, and then stopped flowing completely. Activity at the resort likewise curtailed, and the facility was abandoned. The area around the Santa Fe River is subject to periodic flooding, just as the flow at the spring varies widely. In 1972, flow was measured at 233,280 gallons per day.

The Town of Worthington Springs was officially incorporated in 1963 with a mayor–council government. Street lights were installed, and a playground was created in the town park. In 1975, a community center was built, which included government offices for the town hall.

== Geography ==
The town is located along the Santa Fe River on the southern county line with Alachua.

According to the United States Census Bureau, the town has a total area of 0.4 square miles (1.0 km^{2}), all land.

=== Climate ===
The climate in this area is characterized by hot, humid summers and generally mild winters. According to the Köppen climate classification, the Town of Worthington Springs has a humid subtropical climate zone (Cfa).

== Demographics ==
Historical population
Census	Pop.	Note	%±
1970	214		—
1980	220		2.8%
1990	178		−19.1%
2000	193		8.4%
2010	181		−6.2%
2020	378		108.8%
U.S. Decennial Census

=== 2010 and 2020 census ===
Worthington Springs racial composition (Hispanics excluded from racial categories) (NH = Non-Hispanic)
Race	Pop 2010	Pop 2020	% 2010	% 2020
White (NH)	153	282	84.53%	74.60%
Black or African American (NH)	7	43	3.87%	11.38%
Native American or Alaska Native (NH)	0	3	0.00%	0.79%
Asian (NH)	0	0	0.00%	0.00%
Pacific Islander or Native Hawaiian (NH)	0	0	0.00%	0.00%
Some other race (NH)	0	4	0.00%	1.06%
Two or more races/Multiracial (NH)	8	25	4.42%	6.61%
Hispanic or Latino (any race)	13	21	7.18%	5.56%
Total	181	378	100.00%	100.00%

As of the 2020 United States census, there were 378 people, 126 households, and 89 families residing in the town.

As of the 2010 United States census, there were 181 people, 46 households, and 42 families residing in the town.

=== 2000 census ===
As of the census of 2000, there were 193 people, 70 households, and 52 families residing in the town. The population density was 536.7 inhabitants per square mile (207.2/km^{2}). There were 83 housing units at an average density of 230.8 per square mile (89.1/km^{2}). The racial makeup of the town was 89.64% White, 5.18% African American, 2.07% from other races, and 3.11% from two or more races. Hispanic or Latino of any race were 2.07% of the population.

In 2000, there were 70 households, out of which 40.0% had children under the age of 18 living with them, 52.9% were married couples living together, 18.6% had a female householder with no husband present, and 25.7% were non-families. 20.0% of all households were made up of individuals, and 7.1% had someone living alone who was 65 years of age or older. The average household size was 2.76 and the average family size was 3.08.

In 2000, in the town, the age distribution of the population shows 31.6% under the age of 18, 11.4% from 18 to 24, 26.4% from 25 to 44, 19.2% from 45 to 64, and 11.4% who were 65 years of age or older. The median age was 32 years. For every 100 females, there were 94.9 males. For every 100 females age 18 and over, there were 91.3 males.

In 2000, the median income for a household in the town was $25,625, and the median income for a family was $27,083. Males had a median income of $26,458 versus $14,750 for females. The per capita income for the town was $14,031. About 21.4% of families and 22.3% of the population were below the poverty line, including 10.2% of those under the age of eighteen and 36.4% of those 65 or over.
