= Brooker, Florida =

- Town
- Town of Brooker
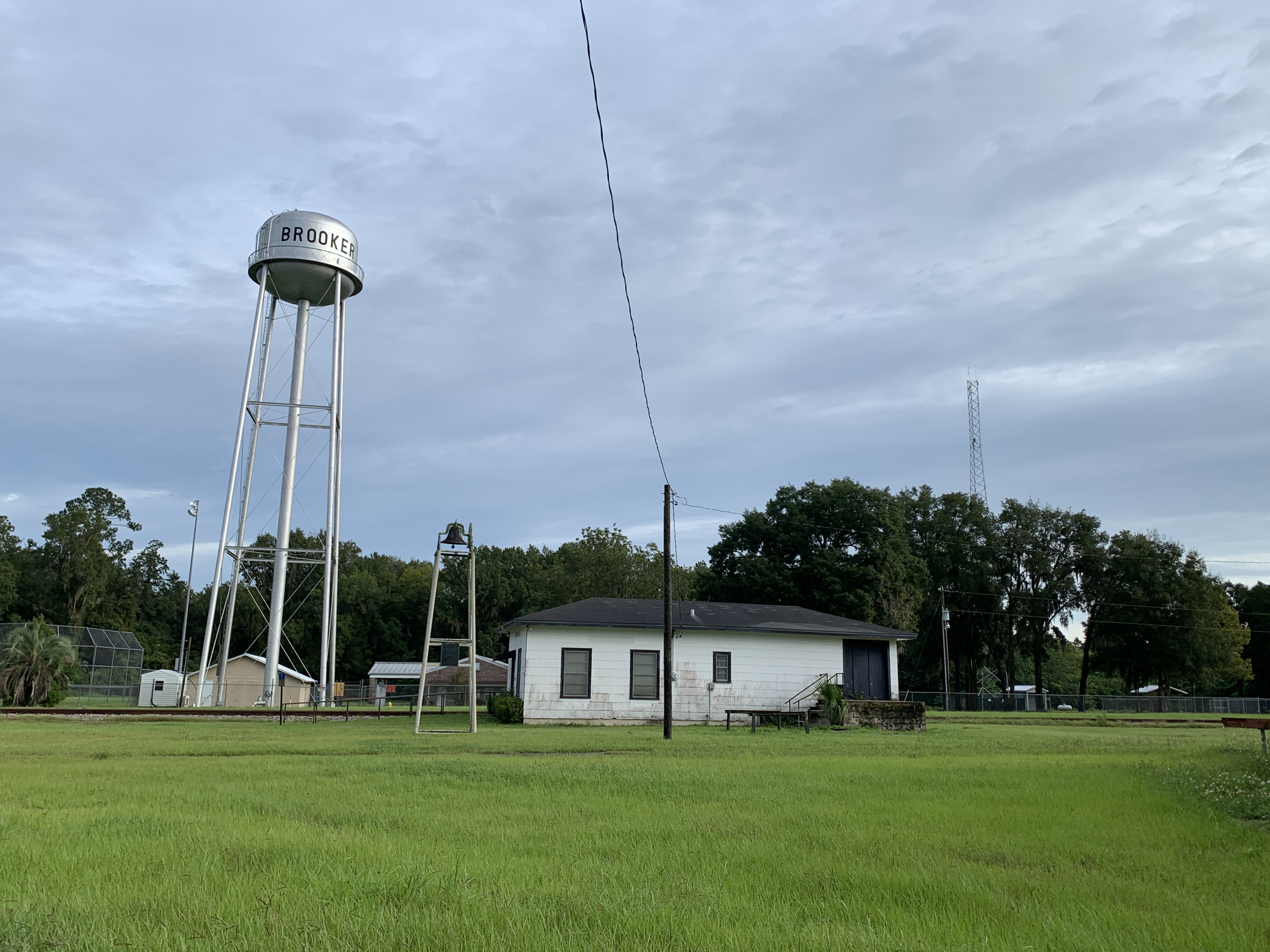
- Brooker Water Tower

- Location in Bradford County and the state of Florida
- Coordinates: 29°53′15″N 82°19′58″W
- Country: United States
- State: Florida
- County: Bradford
- Settled (Ward City): 1838
- Settled (Vandy): April 17, 1893–August 23, 1894
- Unincorporated (Brooker): August 24, 1894
- Incorporated (Town of Brooker): 1952

Government
  - Type: Mayor-Council
  - Mayor: Cecil "C.E. Gene" Melvin
  - Vice Mayor: Chris Caldwell
  - Councilors: Linda Bennett, Kenneth R. "Randy" Starling, and Joe Tolleson
  - Town Clerk: Charlene Thomas
  - Town Attorney: John E. Maines IV

Area
  - Total: 0.53 sq mi (1.37 km^{2})
  - Land: 0.53 sq mi (1.37 km^{2})
  - Water: 0 sq mi (0.00 km^{2})
- Elevation: 121 ft (37 m)

Population (2020)
  - Total: 322
  - Density: 610.7/sq mi (235.81/km^{2})
- Time zone: UTC-5 (Eastern (EST))
  - Summer (DST): UTC-4 (EDT)
- ZIP code: 32622
- Area code: 352
- FIPS code: 12-08725
- GNIS feature ID: 2405327
- Website: townofbrooker.com

Brooker is a town in Bradford County, Florida, United States. It is part of the North Central Florida region. The population was 322 at the 2020 census.

== History ==
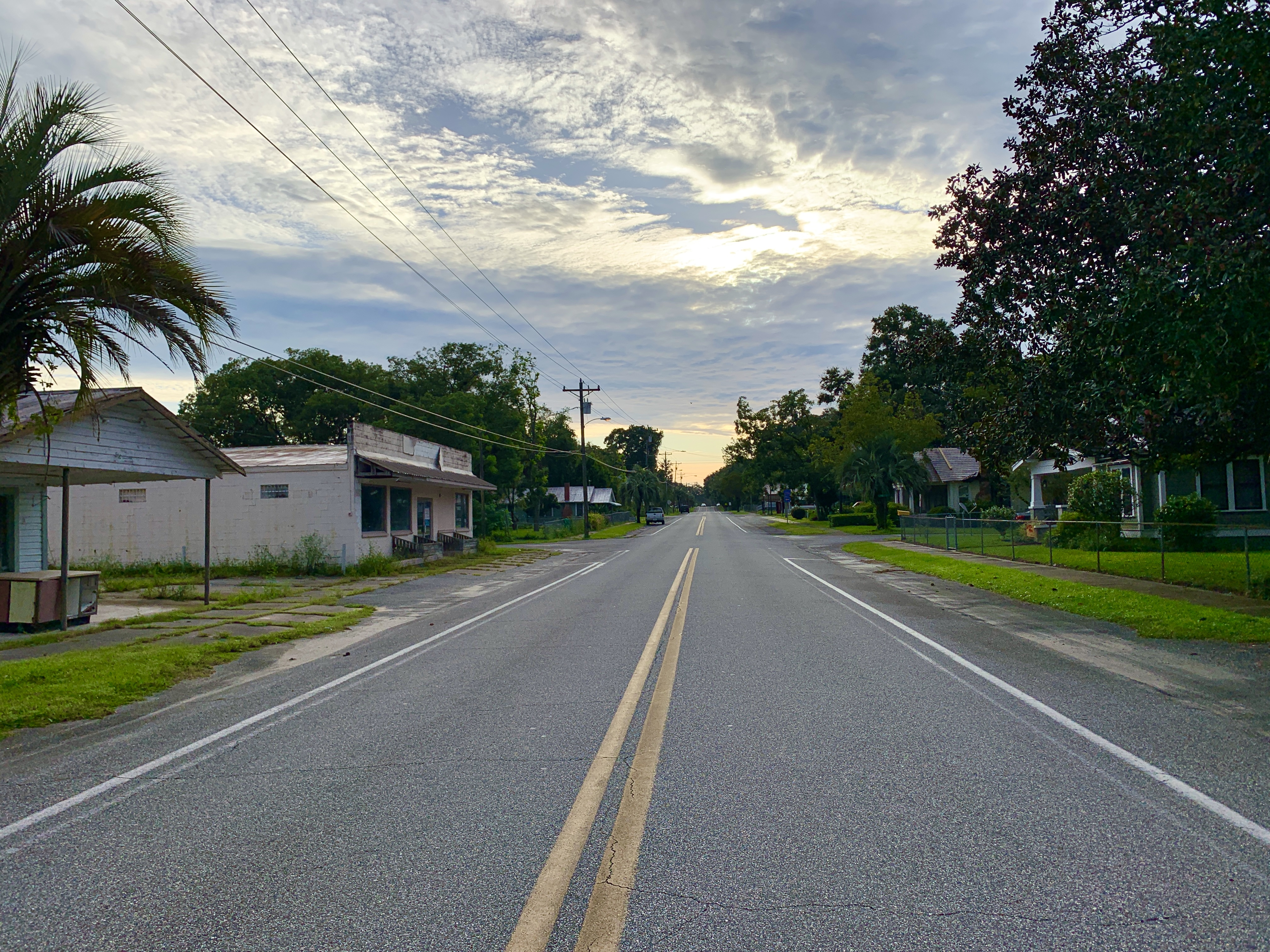
A street view of Brooker homes and stores

In 1838, the community was initially called "Ward City", which was named after an early settler, E. P. Ward. In 1892, Thomas R. Collins petitioned for a US Post Office, and became postmaster in 1894. Between April 17, 1893, and August 23, 1894, the post office was briefly renamed "Vandy", before ultimately being renamed yet again as "Brooker" on August 24, 1894. Collins renamed the post office after the old Brooker Bridge located across the Santa Fe River, which had been named after early local farmer, Ed Brooker. A majority of the residents preferred this name for the area over the name "Ward City", prompting Collins' decision. The Town of Brooker was officially incorporated as a municipality in 1952.

The Town of Brooker is located in western Bradford County.

It is 17 miles (27 km) west of Starke, the county seat. The town has an offshoot of the Santa Fe River running through its town limits as well as Florida State Road 235.

According to the United States Census Bureau, the town has a total area of 0.54 square miles (1.4 km^{2}), all land.

=== Climate ===
The climate in this area is characterized by hot, humid summers and generally mild winters. According to the Köppen climate classification, the Town of Brooker has a humid subtropical climate zone (Cfa).

== Demographics ==
Historical population
Census	Pop.	Note	%±
1950	277		—
1960	292		5.4%
1970	340		16.4%
1980	429		26.2%
1990	312		−27.3%
2000	352		12.8%
2010	338		−4.0%
2020	322		−4.7%
U.S. Decennial Census

=== 2010 and 2020 census ===
Brooker racial composition (Hispanics excluded from racial categories) (NH = Non-Hispanic)
Race	Pop 2010	Pop 2020	% 2010	% 2020
White (NH)	310	281	91.72%	87.27%
Black or African American (NH)	18	18	5.33%	5.59%
Native American or Alaska Native (NH)	0	0	0.00%	0.00%
Asian (NH)	1	1	0.30%	0.31%
Pacific Islander or Native Hawaiian (NH)	0	0	0.00%	0.00%
Some other race (NH)	1	0	0.30%	0.00%
Two or more races/Multiracial (NH)	0	10	0.00%	3.11%
Hispanic or Latino (any race)	8	12	2.37%	3.73%
Total	338	322		

As of the 2020 United States census, there were 322 people, 113 households, and 82 families residing in the town.

As of the 2010 United States census, there were 338 people, 142 households, and 104 families residing in the town.

=== 2000 census ===
As of the census of 2000, there were 352 people, 123 households, and 93 families residing in the town. The population density was 670.7 inhabitants per square mile (259.0/km^{2}). There were 136 housing units at an average density of 259.1 per square mile (100.0/km^{2}). The racial makeup of the town was 97.44% White, 0.57% African American, 1.14% from other races, and 0.85% from two or more races. Hispanic or Latino of any race were 3.12% of the population.

In 2000, there were 123 households, out of which 36.6% had children under the age of 18 living with them, 60.2% were married couples living together, 13.8% had a female householder with no husband present, and 23.6% were non-families. 22.8% of all households were made up of individuals, and 8.9% had someone living alone who was 65 years of age or older. The average household size was 2.69 and the average family size was 3.16.

In 2000, in the town, the population was spread out, with 26.1% under the age of 18, 8.8% from 18 to 24, 24.1% from 25 to 44, 25.0% from 45 to 64, and 15.9% who were 65 years of age or older. The median age was 38 years. For every 100 females, there were 86.2 males. For every 100 females age 18 and over, there were 88.4 males.

In 2000, the median income for a household in the town was $40,000, and the median income for a family was $40,938. Males had a median income of $29,000 versus $22,000 for females. The per capita income for the town was $15,091. About 8.8% of families and 14.0% of the population were below the poverty line, including 2.6% of those under age 18 and 22.0% of those age 65 or over.
