= Pinesville =

Pinesville may refer to:

- Pinesville, Florida, an unincorporated community in Alachua County, Florida, US
- Pinesville, Georgia, an unincorporated community in Jones County, Georgia, US
- Pinesville, New York, a hamlet in Delaware County, New York, US

== See also ==
- Pineville (disambiguation)
