= Harmon Murray =

American criminal

Harmon Murray (1868 or 1869 – 1891) was an African-American who briefly achieved notoriety in 1890 and 1891 as the reputed leader of a feared criminal gang in northern Florida, and for killing a number of men, including a sheriff and a deputy sheriff, before being killed himself by an acquaintance.

== Early life ==
Harmon Murray was born in Long Pond, a community in northern Marion County, Florida, in 1868 or 1869. His parents, Gilbert Murray and Emily James, had been brought to Alachua County from South Carolina in the 1850s as slaves. They were married in 1860. Harmon was their fifth child. He was named after Henry S. Harmon, an African American lawyer and politician in Gainesville.

Emily James' parents were respected citizens in Gainesville, and when Murray was six years old, he went to live with his grandparents so that he could attend the Union Academy there, a school established in 1866 by the Freedmen's Bureau to educate freed slaves. While there, he exhibited behavior that suggests juvenile delinquency. When he was about twelve years old, he left home and reportedly went to Georgia to stay with relatives until 1888, when he was nineteen or twenty years old. It was rumored that he had killed someone near the Satilla River in southeastern Georgia while he lived there.

At the time of Murray's birth, African Americans held political power in Alachua County. They had made up the majority of the population in the county before the Civil War, and immediately after the war cotton farmers, who anticipated a large crop, had recruited African-American workers from Georgia and South Carolina to move to the county and help with the harvest. Reconstruction had initially disenfranchised whites who had supported the Confederacy, and enfranchised African Americans, and thus given them and white Republicans the opportunity to fill political offices. The political position of African Americans in Florida deteriorated after the end of Reconstruction in 1877, and by the time Murray returned to the county in 1888, conservative whites were consolidating their control of state and local politics, and beginning to enact laws intended to suppress and control the African American population.

== Horse theft, prison and escape ==
Shortly after returning to Florida, Murray worked on the dairy farm of Hyman Pinkoson, on the west side of Gainesville near Lake Alice. In September 1888, Murray took his employer's horse to ride to Arredondo, a community southwest of Gainesville, to visit his girlfriend. When Pinkoson found both his horse and Murray gone in the morning, he set out to find them, telling people he met that he suspected Murray had stolen his horse. As Murray was passing through Millard's Station (on the Florida Central and Peninsular Railway between Gainesville and Arredondo) on the way to Gainesville the next morning, a storekeeper named Thomas McPherson recognized him. McPherson called on Murray to stop, but Murray ran and McPherson shot and wounded him. Murray was placed in the county jail.

On September 16, 1888, shortly after Murray was jailed, yellow fever struck Gainesville. A quarantine was imposed, but most of the town's 2,500 residents fled. The fall session of the circuit court was not held in Gainesville that year, and Murray remained in jail until he was brought to trial in May 1889, with circuit judge Jesse J. Finley presiding. Found guilty, Murray was sentenced to two years hard labor in the state penitentiary. As was common at the time, he was hired out to work in a turpentine camp near Tampa.

While imprisoned at the turpentine camp, Murray became friendly with Michael Kelly (a white man), Tony Champion, and Alex Henderson, the last two of whom had family ties to Alachua County. Henderson was released in November 1889. Champion escaped from the prison camp in March, 1890. Murray escaped from the camp in June 1890, and soon reunited with Champion in Tampa. Murray and Champion eventually began committing burglaries in Tampa. On learning that the police were looking for them, they left for Alachua County, reaching Gainesville in October. There they found Alex Henderson, who introduced them to his brother Isaac and other members of a gang. Murray and Champion joined the gang. The gang was soon robbing businesses during the day. As the gang carried rifles during the robberies, they became known as the "Winchester rifle brigade". In January 1891 the gang robbed a store, attacking the owner and almost killing him. There was a public uproar, and the sheriff hired L. T. Timmons, a black private detective, to gather information on the gang.

== Crime spree ==
Michael Kelly was released from the turpentine camp early in November 1890. By the end of the year, Kelly was in Gainesville and early the next year was connected with the Henderson gang. (Note: Braley (p.33) states that Kelly replaced Henderson as the leader of the gang shortly after joining it. Chandler (pp. 184, 187) and Hildreth and Cox (p. 90) state that Murray was the leader.) Beginning around this time, there were a number of burglaries committed throughout Alachua County. Every business in Micanopy was burglarized on the night of January 17. Businesses in Gainesville, Evinston, and Arredondo were also burglarized that month. On the night of February 3, a gang was seen breaking into a store in Waldo, but an armed neighbor chased them off before they could take anything. Later in the week, a gun shop owned by W. H. Bracy in Gainesville was broken into and looted. The burglars set fire to the store, but exploding cartridges woke Bracy, who lived next door, and he was able to put the fire out. Bracy, unsure of the ability of local law enforcement to catch the burglars, also hired the private detective Timmons to find them. One night in the middle of February, a gang threw a brick through a plate glass window of a general merchandise business in Gainesville. A black policeman patrolling the city heard the noise and ran toward the store. The gang fired a couple of shots at the policeman and fled. They shot at a man who spoke to them as they ran by and fired a shotgun and a pistol at a doctor who had stepped out of his house to see what the noise was about. The citizens of the city were upset about the recent events, but little was known about the perpetrators. One witness said that the gang was all black, another witness said it was all white.

L. T. Timmons, the black private detective hired by the sheriff and by Bracy, the gun shop owner, was able to track down Alex Henderson, Murray's former prison camp-mate, on the day after the shootings in Gainesville. Henderson, unhappy about the close call of the previous night, as well as the rapid pace of the gang's burglaries, agreed to give Timmons information about the gang in exchange for ten dollars. Henderson told Timmons that the gang planned that night to attack the general store in Millard's Station belonging to Thomas McPherson, the man who had shot Murray two-and-a-half years before. Timmons then took Henderson to Bracy, who agreed to pay a reward to Henderson if he could lead the rest of the gang into a trap. The sheriff was brought into the plan. Henderson was to bring the other gang members back to a hideout, where the sheriff and a posse would be waiting in hiding. However, the gang did not return directly to the hideout, but went to McPherson's store first. When the gang tried to break into his store, McPherson woke up and armed himself. The would-be burglars retreated, and set McPherson's barn on fire. McPherson was shot while watching his barn burn, and died later in the night. In the confusion after McPherson was shot, Kelly and Champion reportedly were hit by gunfire, but escaped with Murray and returned to Gainesville.

== The end of the gang; Champion and Kelly lynched ==
The sheriff's posse was still waiting when the gang returned to their hideout. When challenged by the sheriff, the gang opened fire, wounding Sam Wienges, a former sheriff who was part of the posse. Kelly emptied two pistols at the posse. Champion was wounded in the firefight and captured. Champion admitted to some of the crimes attributed to the gang, but denied participation in others. He said that there was a second gang operating in the area, and that the two gangs sometimes shared a campsite, but were not part of a larger organization.

Kelly was wounded, as well, but he and Murray were able to escape. Kelly was caught the next day near Rochelle, east of Gainesville, and taken by train back to Gainesville. Angered by McPherson's death and reports that former sheriff Wienges might be permanently blinded by his wounds, a mob met the train and threatened to lynch Kelly, but he was successfully transferred to the jail, where he joined Champion. Kelly gave several interviews that afternoon, feeding the stories told about him. As a white man in an otherwise African American gang, Kelly gained much attention after his capture. By his own account, he was Irish, was born in London as Michael Kierens, and had worked as a sailor, traveling as far as Australia and China. A story circulated that his real name was Michael Aries Hurley, that his family were "gentlefolk" in northern Ireland, and that he had been educated in a Jesuit college, destined for the priesthood. He was said to have fought Indians in the U.S. Army, then deserted, to have killed a man in Manitoba with an axe, to have been sent to prison for robbery, and escaped, to have shanghaied sailors in New York, and to have been a church organist in Kentucky. Kelly admitted to committing crimes with the gang, but claimed he had only been with the gang for a couple of weeks. He blamed McPherson's murder on Champion and Murray, but Champion had already admitted that he, Murray, and Kelly had all fired at McPherson. The evening of Kelly's jailing, at around 10:00 PM, a mob of 200 to 300 men forced their way into the jail and took Champion and Kelly. The two men were taken to a live oak grove on the north side of Gainesville and hanged.

Henderson had been in the jail since the night of McPherson's murder, but the lynch mob had not realized that he had been in the gang with Champion, Kelly, and Murray, and had left him when they took Champion and Kelly. Anxiety was high in Gainesville for a while, as it was believed that Champion, Henderson, Kelly. and Murray were part of a larger gang that had committed forty crimes in fourteen counties across northern Florida. A grand jury was convened on February 25 to consider a case against Henderson. As there were no witnesses placing Henderson at McPherson's murder, and no other charges had been brought in consideration of the information Henderson supplied which led to the capture of Champion and Kelly, he was released. The same grand jury found that Champion and Kelly had died at the hands of "unknown persons". Henderson left Gainesville and went to Jacksonville, where, unknown to him, Murray was working for the police department.

== A series of murders ==
Near the end of March, Henderson left Jacksonville to visit his mother in High Springs. Less than a week later, he encountered Murray, who shot and killed him. Murray fled to Fernandina, where his sister lived. Murray was soon committing burglaries and robberies in Fernandina and elsewhere on Amelia Island. Law officers chased a black suspect several times, who shot at them on one occasion. Murray taunted the police with a letter in early May, to the effect that he would not be taken alive, and would take the Nassau County sheriff and Fernandina police chief with him.

On May 16, acting on a tip, police surrounded the house Murray was staying in. Murray heard the officers getting into position, and shot and killed deputy sheriff Joseph W. Robinson. In the ensuing gun battle Murray wounded Fernandina Police Chief James Higgenbotham. Although grazed on the wrist and scalp, Murray was able to escape. Despite the intensive manhunt for him, Murray was able to slip off of Amelia Island to the mainland. The City of Fernandina had now offered a reward for the capture of Murray, "dead or alive". On hearing of the events in Fernandina, the Alachua County Commission offered a reward of $500, on top of $250 previously raised by the community.

Murray headed back to Alachua County, managing to avoid the search for him. On May 31, he reached Barnville, a community north of Starke. There he met a man known as Prince Albert. Albert was a barber, and agreed to shave Murray and cut his hair. Murray told Albert that he had killed a policeman in Fernandina, and now had a price on his head. Murray also told Albert where he planned to spend the night, and invited Albert to go there to play cards. After Murray left, Albert went to the sheriff and told him about Murray. David Alvarez had been the City Marshal in Starke, but was appointed Sheriff of Bradford County after the preceding sheriff, Henry Epperson, had been killed in January 1890, while trying to arrest a gambler. Alvarez gathered a posse and went after Murray. After the posse was in place, Albert went into the house after Murray. When Murray realized that Albert had brought the sheriff, he shot and killed Albert. In the ensuing gunfight, Sheriff Alvarez was killed and Murray escaped. (Note: The sheriff's office in Bradford County was a dangerous place to work in the late 19th century and the beginning of the 20th century. Three serving sheriffs and two deputies died of gunshot wounds in the line of duty between 1885 and 1903. A former sheriff died in the line of duty while working as a deputy sheriff in Nassau County. Another serving sheriff may have committed suicide, or been murdered. Still another serving sheriff was killed in a fight while not on duty.) At this time Murray's notoriety had attracted attention from as far away as New York.

== Pursuit and escape ==
Murray now moved around the countryside of north-central Florida. Searchers found a campsite he had used on an island in Lake Santa Fe. Posses patrolled throughout the area. There were false alarms. A black man carrying a Winchester rifle was arrested in Silver Springs on suspicion of being Murray, but was cleared. As sheriff Fennell pursued Murray around northeastern Alachua County, a report of a black man rowing a boat out to the island in Lake Santa Fe sent the sheriff and his posse out there again, but the camp was empty.

Murray tried to return to Jacksonville, but was seen near Green Cove Springs in late June. A posse led by the Clay County sheriff pursued Murray, but he was able to reach Palatka, in Putnam County, where he hoped to cross the St. Johns River and then head for Jacksonville. The sheriff of Clay County notified the sheriff of Putnam County of Murray's presence, and the latter organized a posse of 100 men to search for Murray. With the way across the river guarded by the posse, Murray headed west to Gainesville.

Murray's reputation as a bold and violent man was growing during this period. There were stories of him appearing in public without being recognized, or only recognized after he began talking about himself. He bought a suit of clothes at a store on the courthouse square in Gainesville and left without being recognized. He joined groups of blacks for meals or conversations, with people only gradually becoming aware of who he was. Tales spread of him confronting whites, threatening some, and leaving without consequences. He talked about killing white men he felt were responsible for the lynching of Champion and Kelly. One assassination attempt was thwarted when the victim was warned that Murray was laying in ambush for him. Murray shot at a man named McKinne on his front porch, but missed. Murray caught a man he accused of riding in a posse after him, threatened to hang him, and went as far as to place a noose around his neck, but then released him.

== An interview and more murders; Andy Ford lynched ==
The postmaster in Gainesville, James Bell, was a Republican, appointed by President Benjamin Harrison, and had contacts in the black community. He arranged to meet Murray August 3 for an interview in a black church in Gainesville, intending to write a book about Murray and paying him with funds raised from several people in the community. At that meeting Murray denied killing McPherson, blaming Champion and Kelly, but admitted to other murders, including that of Alex Henderson. It was evident that Murray could move freely around the county. Pressure grew on the authorities to capture him. They, in turn, put pressure on the black community, who were believed to be providing aid to Murray. As Murray's legend grew across the state, the governor offered $250 for Murray's capture, dead or alive. Combined with rewards offered by the cities of Fernandina and Starke, by Alachua County, and by the citizens of Gainesville, there was now more than $1,500 on Murray's head. Citizens in Gainesville, upset that the law had failed to capture Murray, and stung by Bell's interview of Murray in town, staged a series of anti-Murray rallies, the first on August 4. Resolutions passed at the rally stated that law-abiding citizens should help law officers catch Murray, and that anybody who helped Murray was a public enemy.

Murray had been staying in the area of Campville and Orange Heights, in eastern Alachua County. He had taken some acquaintances from the area as bodyguards when he met with Bell in Gainesville. One that he trusted in particular was Andy Ford, who lived in Orange Heights. Murray and Ford went to Wacahoota on August 16. Murray intended to kill McKinne, the white man he had shot at and missed earlier that year. It was growing dark as the two approached McKinne's house, and they shot and killed two men standing on the porch, but neither was McKinne. They were blacks who worked for him. The next night Murray and Ford went to Earleton, where they beat up Joe Speed, who had informed on Murray to the sheriff. The sheriff then went after Ford and arrested him on August 20. Ford was placed in the county jail and was arraigned on August 24. That night, the jailor was tricked into opening the jail door, and Andy Ford was taken and hanged from the same tree where Champion had been hanged. Ford's death was ruled to have been "at the hands of parties unknown", just as Champion's and Kelly's had been.

== The death of Harmon Murray ==
Murray was running out of options for hiding places. A fire in Jacksonville had burned many of the places where he might have sought refuge. The part of the black community that had previously been willing to help or tolerate Murray had been affected by harassment from authorities searching for Murray, Murray's murder of the two blacks at McKinne's farm, and his brutal beating of Joe Speed. Murray now headed for his family home at Long Pond. Murray was reported to be at Evinston on August 31, where he shot at a man. Sheriff Fennell had heard that Murray was headed for Long Pond, and had posses out in the area. The Alachua County commission added another $1,000 to the reward on September 1. Despite the men looking for him, Murray reached Long Pond on September 3, and searched out his cousin, Elbert Hardy. After initially expressing distrust of Hardy, Murray relented and asked Hardy to go with him to Archer. Murray told Hardy that he wanted to "kill some crackers". Murray wanted Hardy to be armed, and Hardy borrowed a shotgun from his brother-in-law, Tucker Barnes. While walking to Archer, Hardy managed to fall behind Murray and shot him in the head.

Hardy returned to his brother-in-law's cabin and told Barnes and another man, Sam Williams, that he had killed Murray. The three men returned to where Murray's body lay. With the help of Jesse Poque, a white farmer, they used a wagon and horse from a livery stable and carried Murray's body into Archer. The four men were hailed as heroes, and when it was made clear that Hardy had killed Murray, coins were thrown at Hardy's feet. Word of Murray's death was telegraphed to Gainesville, but Hardy's name was mangled as "Handy Early". Murray's body was taken to Gainesville on the train, and greeted there by a large crowd. Hardy was once more cheered. Murray's body was embalmed and displayed in Gainesville for three days. It was then taken to Starke and put on display again. A week after Murray's body was buried, it was found hanging upside down from a tree, with the head missing. The body was reburied, but the head was never found. Elbert Hardy, who was seventeen years old, received the reward money of more than $2,000. He bought land and eventually established a horse farm. Once again, news of Harmon Murray reached New York.

== See also ==
- Railroad Bill – American folk legend
