= Pineville =

Pineville may refer to a place in the United States:

- Pineville, Arkansas
- Pineville, Kentucky
- Pineville, Louisiana
- Pineville, Missouri
- Pineville, North Carolina
- Pineville, Pennsylvania
- Pineville, West Virginia
- Pineville, South Carolina

== See also ==
- Pinesville (disambiguation)
