= Burton H. Rawls =

American politician

Burton H. Rawls (Marcy 28, 1891 - May 19, 1987) was an American politician from High Springs, Florida. He served in the Florida House of Representatives from 1933 - 1935. He also served on the High Springs City Commission from 1931 - 1932. He served as postmaster in High Springs and was also a lawyer.
