= Bland, Florida =

- Unincorporated community
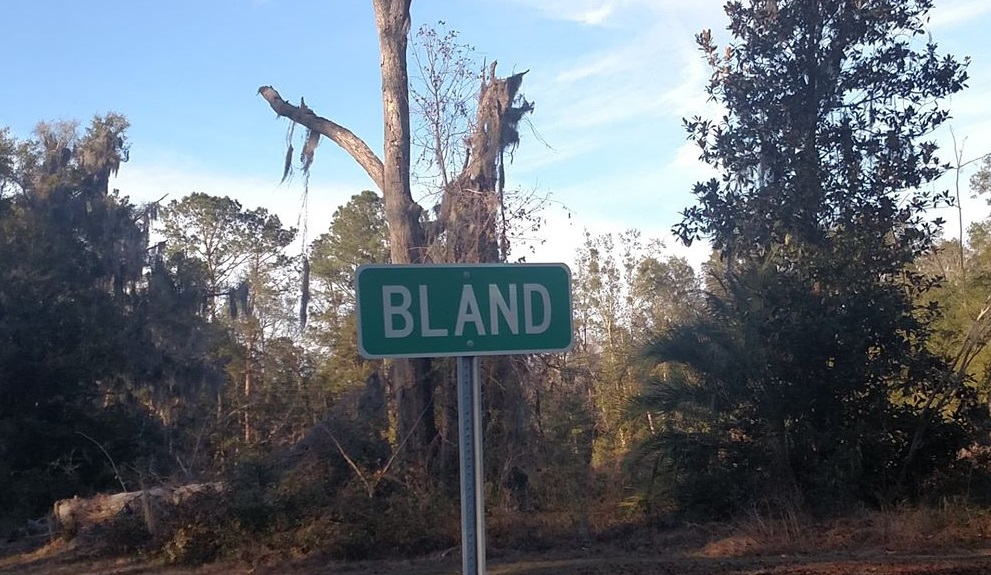
- Bland highway sign

- Location within Florida
- Coordinates: 29°54′08″N 82°29′58″W
- Country: United States
- State: Florida
- County: Alachua
- Elevation: 154 ft (47 m)
- Time zone: UTC-5 (Eastern (EST))
  - Summer (DST): UTC-4 (EDT)
- Area code: 352
- GNIS feature ID: 295136

Bland is an unincorporated community in northwestern Alachua County, Florida, United States. Cotton planters from Georgia and South Carolina settled in the area in the 1840s. The community briefly had a post office, from 1903 to 1906. The Alachua County School Board operated the Ogden School (Elementary School No. 49) for African-American students of the Bland community from the early 1900s until 1951.

William Washington, who successfully homesteaded 102 acres (41 ha) in the Bland area, has been identified as an ancestor of Whoopi Goldberg.
