= Railroad Bill =

American folk legend

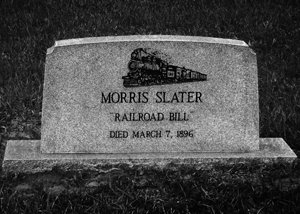
- Headstone on Railroad Bill's grave in St. John's Cemetery, Pensacola, Florida.
- Born: Morris Slater
- Died: March 7, 1896; Atmore, Alabama
- Burial place: Pensacola, Florida
- Years active: 1895–1896

Morris Slater (died March 7, 1896) was a black American man notable for his dramatic escapes from the law in the style of Robin Hood. He acquired the name Railroad Bill, among other names. Although there was a price on his head for some years, he evaded capture through ingenuity and exceptional athletic abilities. He was eventually shot dead in an ambush at a store he was known to visit. Slater is celebrated in the folk-ballad "Railroad Bill" (Roud 4181), which has been recorded by numerous artists, including Lonnie Donegan, Taj Mahal, Bob Dylan, Joan Baez, Ramblin' Jack Elliott, Andrew Bird, Roger McGuinn, Doc Watson, and Dave Alvin.

== Early life ==
Little is known about the personal life of the individual who became notorious as Railroad Bill. His true name, location of his birth, and details of his family have been debated since his criminal career ended in 1896. What is known is that he once traveled with a circus and learned showmanship and the skills of a performer. He joined a turpentine company in South Carolina and continued with the firm when it moved to Baldwin County, Alabama, and Bluff Springs, Florida. In the turpentine camps he was known as Morris Slater—a profoundly athletic, "top notch" laborer and affable individual.

== Trouble with the law ==
Slater became an antagonist of the Louisville and Nashville Railroad after a brakeman found him stealing a ride to Mobile, Alabama, and threw him off the moving train. In turn, the turpentine worker fired his rifle at the brakeman. That altercation led Slater into a personal vendetta against the company, in which he would wound several trainmen, commandeer a train and force it out of the station, and threaten the life of James I. McKinnie, Superintendent of L&N's Mobile and Montgomery Division. The company responded by dispatching detectives to investigate the offender and offering a $350 reward for his capture. Not knowing Slater's name, detectives simply called him Railroad Bill, which was the alias of another L&N antagonist who lived in Mobile. Slater embraced the moniker, and it became the name reporters typically used in writing hundreds of newspaper articles about his criminal activities.

Slater also became a wanted man in Florida after a deputy sheriff attempted to arrest him for carrying a repeating rifle without a permit as required by the state. The arrest attempt turned into a gunfight in which the turpentine worker armed with a rifle wounded the deputy armed with a shotgun. Slater quit the turpentine business and organized a freight-car gang to steal merchandise from L&N trains operating in southwestern Alabama. Their modus operandi was to place a man inside a box car at night just before the train left a station and when it was underway the man would throw cargo from the car onto the track to be retrieved by other members of the gang. Legend states that the plunder was given to the poor, but evidence suggests most of it was sold to company stores associated with turpentine camps.

== Gunfight at Hurricane Bayou ==
On March 6, 1895, the crew of a freight train found Railroad Bill asleep behind a water tank near Hurricane Bayou, west of Bay Minette, Alabama, and took his rifle and pistol before awakening him. To their surprise he jumped to his feet, ran about a hundred yards, and pulled another revolver and engaged them in a gunfight. He forced the trainmen to seek refuge in a section house where they were reinforced by a bridge crew and armed themselves with shotguns. The trainmen advanced on the outlaw, but just at that time a second train pulled up to the tank. Railroad Bill sprang into the cab and forced the engineer to drive it out of the station. As the locomotive passed the section house, the wounded desperado fired on his adversaries who could not return fire for fear of hitting the engineer. When the train was several hundred yards away, Railroad Bill brazenly got off and preceded back to again engage the men in a gunfight. The gunfight lasted until Railroad Bill ran out of ammunition and escaped into the swamplands.

== Death of James Stewart ==
On the night of April 6, 1895, Railroad Bill engaged two men in a gunfight on a rural road near Bay Minette, Alabama. Both men escaped to town and alerted an L&N detective. The detective organized a posse that pursued the desperado for several miles before surrounding him in a barn around midnight. In the gunfight that ensued, Deputy Sheriff James Stewart, a member of the posse, was killed, and Railroad Bill escaped.

Rewards offered for the desperado increased to $500, dead or alive. Sheriff Edward S. McMillan of Escambia County, Alabama led the state's effort to apprehend him. He was familiar with the desperado and made a public promise to capture him. In turn, Railroad Bill replied in a note, "I wish you hadn’t made that statement because I love you, Mr. Ed, and I don’t want to kill you."

== Death of Mark Stinson ==
To assist in locating the fugitive, Superintendent McKinnie recruited Mark Stinson, a confidant of the outlaw, to serve as an undercover agent and provide information on the desperado's whereabouts. Using information from Stinson, a posse followed Railroad Bill's trail to Pollard, Alabama, on April 12, 1895. But before an attempt was made to apprehend him, Railroad Bill robbed the Pollard armory of rifles and ammunition and fled. He also made arrangements to rendezvous with Stinson a few nights later at a remote cabin by a railroad track in Mount Vernon, Alabama. With that knowledge, a posse of railroad detectives assaulted the cabin on the night of the rendezvous, mistook Stinson for Railroad Bill, and killed him. Railroad Bill had learned of the plan and had avoided the attack.

== Death of Sheriff McMillan ==
In July 1895, Sheriff McMillan at Brewton, Alabama, learned that Railroad Bill was in Bluff Springs, Florida. The Alabama sheriff, who had also been deputized as an officer of the law in Florida, formed a posse and crossed the state line to capture the desperado on the night of July 3. But as the sheriff and his posse approached Railroad Bill's hideout, they were surprised by the desperado who ambushed the sheriff and had a gunfight with the posse before escaping. McMillan was killed July 3, 1895.

New rewards were offered after McMillan's death, raising the total offered for his capture to $1,250. It was sufficient to attract bounty hunters, law officers, railroad detectives, and Pinkerton agents from as far away as Chicago. The cagy desperado, nevertheless, could not be found.

== Castleberry chase ==
Railroad Bill's trail was located in Escambia County, Alabama on July 29, 1895, and a posse followed it into the swamplands of Murder Creek, between Brewton and Castleberry, Alabama. For five days the posse, which swelled in number to nearly a hundred men, sought the outlaw's capture. In one incident he exchanged shots with one member of the posse before escaping; in another he got the drop on two posse members before escaping; and in another he killed one of the bloodhounds and escaped.

== Emerging lore ==
Railroad Bill's growing legacy of miraculous escapes, which would ultimately number about seventeen, led to a profusion of tongue-in-cheek stories by African Americans taunting the failure of authorities to hem in the nationally famous desperado. The general theme of their stories was that he could change at will into an animal or an inanimate object to avoid capture. There also emerged an African American folk ballad in 1895 that celebrated his exploits. Titled "Railroad Bill," the ballad has been sung ever since by an inordinate number of musicians employing varying lyrics but always with a bad-man theme. It also became popular in Europe and Australia after Lonnie Donegan, the "King of Skiffle," produced an eminently popular rendition in the 1950s. His version of "Railroad Bill" influenced a generation of young British artists, including The Beatles.

== Death of Railroad Bill ==
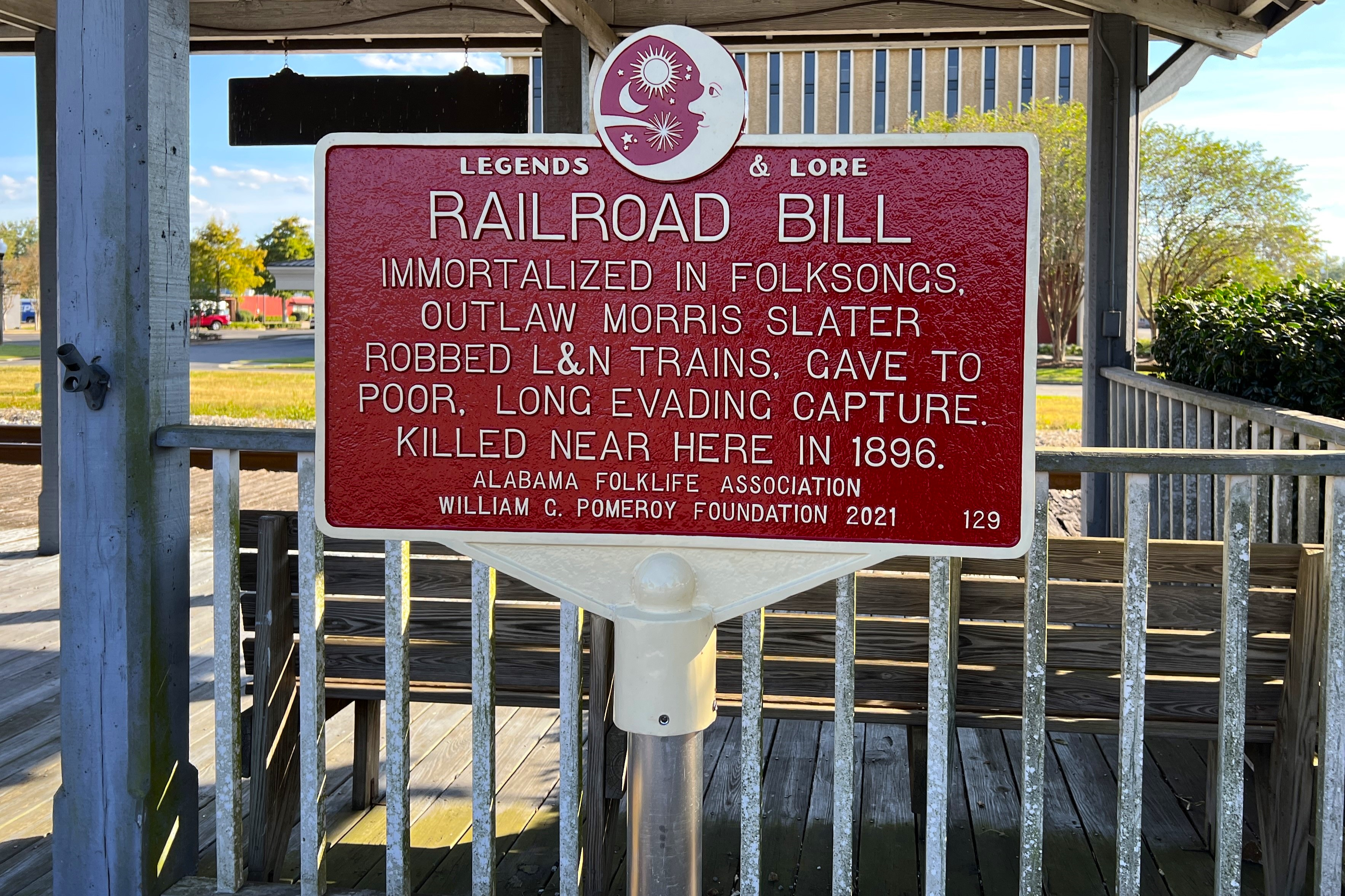
Historic marker placed by the Alabama Folklife Association near the site of Railroad Bill's death in Atmore, Alabama.

On March 7, 1896, Railroad Bill was cornered and killed inside a general store in Atmore, Alabama. Knowing he would come to the store around closing time, the proprietor staged an ambush by positioning two men with weapons hidden from view. The plan was to wait for the proprietor to give a predetermined signal before they opened fire on the desperado. Their scheme was interrupted by a two-man posse that was also hunting the fugitive. One posse member entered the store about the same time as Railroad Bill and waited for the second posse member, Atmore Constable Leonard McGowin, to arrive. When McGowin entered a few minutes later, he saw the desperado seated in front and with his back to him talking with the proprietor. Although no signal to commence firing was given, the constable raised his rifle and fired twice at point-blank range into the desperado. As Railroad Bill rose to his feet and reached for one of his two revolvers he was shot multiple times again by the deputy and two others inside the store. Railroad Bill, veteran of numerous gunfights, staggered forward a few steps before falling dead on the floor. However, according to a correction based on an interview with James Sellars (Robertsdale, Alabama), grandson of Sears Sellars who was an eyewitness to the killing, it was Dick Johns (bounty hunter from Texas) who ambushed Railroad Bill in the store near Atmore. J.L. McGowan was in the "railroad head" working as a telegraph operator when the shooting occurred and ran over to see what happened. Recorded on tape at age 94, Sears said that McGowan telegraphed authorities and collected the reward money, then posed for pictures and charged a fee for his photo with the outlaw's dead body. Sears' son Josh was mayor of Robertsdale, Ala., for 28 years.

== Disposition of the body ==
The body of Railroad Bill was embalmed and transported by officers to Montgomery, Alabama, for official identification that would qualify the payment of reward money. There was a great demand in the city to see the body, leading the officers to place it on display for a price, charging twenty-five cents per customer. City authorities condemned the practice, and the body was taken to Pensacola, Florida for official identification to receive the reward offered by the state. It was again placed on public display at a price, and again city authorities ordered the practice to cease. The body was transported to Mobile, but on arrival the officers were met with an order from the mayor prohibiting the display of the body for commercial gain. It was taken to Birmingham, Alabama, to be "petrified" by a process that would allow it to be placed on permanent display—a practice of carnivals and freak shows at the turn of the century. However, it was not again placed on public display. Instead, it was transported back to Pensacola on March 30, 1896, and given a Christian interment in the African American section of St. John's Cemetery. The ceremony was attended by the mayor and various dignitaries of the city. The location of the grave, however, was unmarked and became lost until rediscovered in 2012 using original interment records. A headstone was then placed on the grave to mark the last resting place of this American desperado.

== See also ==
- List of train songs
- Harmon Murray

== Bibliography ==
- McMillan, Edward Leigh (October 12, 1927). "Gordon MS 3442". Letter to R. W. Gordon. Robert W. Gordon Manuscript Collection, American Folklife Center, Library of Congress, Washington, D.C.
- Massey, Larry (2015). Life and Crimes of Railroad Bill: Legendary African American Desperado. University Press of Florida. ISBN 978-0-8130-6120-7.
- Odum, Howard W. (July–September 1911). "Folk-Song and Folk-Poetry as Found in the Secular Songs of the Southern Negroes". Journal of American Folk-Lore. 24 (93): 255–294. doi:10.2307/534456. JSTOR 534456.
- Penick, James (Fall 1994). "Railroad Bill". Gulf Coast Historical Review. 10 (1): 85–92.
- Potter, Henderson A. A Brief History of Escambia County, Alabama.
- Scribner, R. L. (1949). "A Short History of Brewton, Alabama". Alabama Historical Quarterly. 11 (1–4): 73–79.
