= Ellis Amburn =

American book editor and biographer (1933–2018)

Ellis Edward Amburn
- Born: 2 August 1933; Jack County, Texas, U.S.
- Died: August 18, 2018 (aged 85)
- Occupations: biographer and book editor

Ellis Edward Amburn (2 August 1933 – 18 August 2018) was an American book editor and biographer.

== Life ==
A 1954 graduate of Texas Christian University, Ellis Amburn worked as a reporter for Newsweek before going into the book publishing industry where he rose to the position of editor, working for such well-known publishers as Delacorte Press, Coward-McCann, William Morrow. During his career, Amburn was an editor for authors such John le Carré, Belva Plain, Muriel Spark, Joshua Logan and for Jack Kerouac, who would be the subject of Amburn's 1998 book on which Leonardo DiCaprio has optioned film rights.

Amburn served as editorial director for G. P. Putnam's Sons and in addition worked as a ghostwriter for Priscilla Presley, Shelley Winters, Peggy Lee and Zsa Zsa Gabor. In 1990, he produced his first biography on fellow Texan Roy Orbison that led to further such books. He is noted for his exhaustive research, even going so far as to live for several weeks at the home of the parents of Orbison's first wife, Claudette Frady-Orbison. His books have generated controversy at times (such as his biography of Janis Joplin), and he is reviled by many Buddy Holly and Roy Orbison fans for presenting hearsay as fact.

Amburn lived in High Springs, Florida, outside of Gainesville and in Tifton, Georgia. His papers are held at Texas Christian University.

== Death ==
The Virginian-Pilot and the literary website Shelf Awareness reported that Amburn died on Saturday, August 18, 2018, after a long illness. Maureen O'Brien, book editor, ghostwriter, and friend of Amburn's remembered him thus: "Always the chipper man about town and cheerleader to his multitude of friends all over the world, Ellis was writing and editing right up to the end, working on a memoir of his celebrity-filled life in the book biz, where he was considered one of the best pop culture chroniclers from New York City to Hollywood and all points in between. A great gossip and even better confidant and friend, he was a true role model and mentor."

== Partial bibliography ==
- Pearl: The Obsessions and Passions of Janis Joplin (2005) - Warner Books
- The Sexiest Man Alive : A Biography of Warren Beatty (2002) - HarperCollins
- The Most Beautiful Woman in the World: The Obsessions, Passions, and Courage of Elizabeth Taylor (2000) - HarperCollins
- Subterranean Kerouac: The Hidden Life of Jack Kerouac (1998) - St. Martin's Press
- Buddy Holly: A Biography (1995) - St. Martin's Press
- Dark Star: The Roy Orbison Story (1990) - Carol Publishing Group
- Olivia de Havilland and the Golden Age of Hollywood (2018) - Lyons Press
