= Gordon, Florida =

Unincorporated community in Alachua County

Coordinates: 29.8286111°N 82.3330556°W

Gordon is a community in northern Alachua County, Florida.

Garth Wilkinson "Wilkie" James established a cotton plantation in Gordon after the Civil War. James was a younger brother of Henry James and William James, and an abolitionist. He served as an officer with the 54th Massachusetts Infantry Regiment in the Civil War and was severely wounded at the Battle of Fort Wagner. He returned to service with the 54th before the end of the war, when the regiment was in Florida. After the Civil War, John Murray Forbes, a staunch abolitionist and a friend of Wilkie James' father, Henry James Sr., advocated the development of cotton farming in the South using the labor of freedmen. With funds from Forbes and from his father, James began buying largely undeveloped land in Gordon in February 1866. He eventually spent $40,000 for about 3,000 acres (12 km^{2}) of land, which was then cleared and planted in cotton. James' aunt, Catherine James Temple, also invested in the plantation, but most of the funds came from Henry James Sr., eventually taking a large part of his wealth.

James hoped that the plantation would help bring equality and education to the freedmen, writing that "the freed negro under decent and just treatment can be worked to profit by employer and employee". The plantation included a school serving white and black students. A post office was opened in 1866, with James serving as postmaster, and closed in 1869.

Like thousands of other northerners who bought up cheap land in the South and tried to create new plantations employing freedmen, Wilkie James had no experience farming. In the Autumn of 1867 Wilkie returned to his parents' home suffering from malaria. The cotton crop had done very poorly that year, due to incessant rains and catterpillars [sic]. The price of cotton had greatly fallen, from $1.00 per pound at the end of the Civil War to 14 cents a pound in 1867. Neighboring whites were hostile to James's treatment of blacks as equals, and night riders harassed the black workers on the plantation. The cotton crop failed again in 1868 and 1869. James was able to return Forbes's investment within a couple of years. James was also able to repay his aunt Kate, but was unable to return his father's investment. Wilkie was hospitalized for his malaria in the summer of 1869. He then returned to Florida to sell off what he could of the failed plantation. James left the state in 1871.

By the 1880s, Gordon was described as a fairly prosperous farming community. Monteocha Park is a county park located in Gordon (Monteocha is another community adjacent to Gordon).

== Sources ==
- "Apthorp's Florida, 1878". Florida Memory: State Library and Archives of Florida.
- Fisher, Paul (2008). House of Wits: An Intimate Portrait of the James Family. New York: Henry Holt and Company. ISBN 978-0-8050-7490-1.
- Pickard, John B. (1994). Florida's Eden: An Illustrated History of Alachua County. Gainesville, Florida: Maupin House. ISBN 0-929895-12-6.
- Richardson, Robert D. (2006). William James: In the Maelstrom of American Modernism. Boston: Houghton Mifflin. ISBN 978-0-618-43325-4.
