= Fred Cone Park =

Park in Gainesville, Florida, United States

- Interactive map of Fred Cone Park
- Type: Municipal
- Location: Gainesville, Florida, United States
- Coordinates: 29.650°N 82.288°W
- Area: 152.48-acre (61.71 ha)
- Created: 2004
- Operator: Gainesville Parks Recreation and Cultural Affairs
- Website: Fred Cone Park

Fred Cone Park is a 152.48-acre (61.71 ha) urban park in Gainesville, Florida. It is part of the city's Eastside Community Center.

== History ==
Serving as a recreation and community center in northeast Gainesville, the park is named after Fred P. Cone, who served as the 27th governor of Florida.

At least as early as 1995, city officials discussed a need to develop the park. Gainesville residents Thomas Hawkins and Davis Rembert started a fundraising effort, garnering over $2 million from private and government funds. A ceremony commemorating the opening of the park and its community center was held in April 2004. Florida's governor at the time, Jeb Bush, attended the ceremony.

In 2008, Alachua County voters approved of the Wild Spaces Public Places half-cent sales tax initiative to fund improvements to the park. Completed in 2012, the building project for these improvements cost $1.4 million, and saw the addition of a track, an interior field for athletics events such as pole vault, shot put, high jump and long jump, two basketball courts, two bathrooms, bleachers, and additional capabilities for soccer play, as well as parking spaces.

Further renovations to the park were completed in 2019, including a resurfacing of the track, the addition of shade sails for the bleachers, and an overhaul of the park's drainage system. These renovations cost around $500,000. Also in 2019, the University of Florida's Institute of Food and Agricultural Sciences (UF/IFAS) conducted a study at the park's multipurpose field, testing the effectiveness of using organic compost on turfgrass. In 2021, the city began planting trees at three designated areas, including Cone Park, allowing for people to pick fruit.

== Facilities and uses ==
The park is home to various features used for sports and recreation, including its eight-lane, 440-meter rubberized track. The track's interior field allows for events such as the pole vault, shot put, high jump, as well as long jump, and features a multi-purpose field. Elsewhere in the park, there are two basketball courts and picnic areas.

In addition to its usage for sports and recreation, the park is also one of the city's three "edible grove" areas, as well as the site for the Cone Park Branch of the Alachua County Library District. The branch opened in November 2011.
