= Flora, Florida =

Unincorporated community in Alachua County

Coordinates: 29.662°N 82.309°W

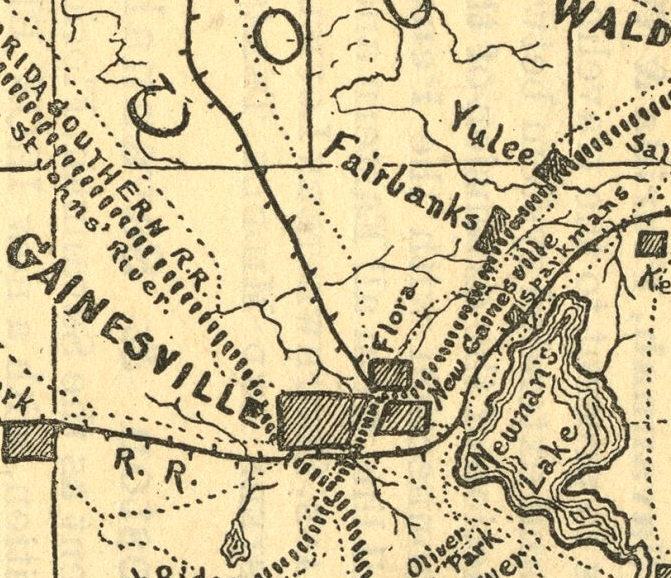
Portion of a map of Alachua County from 1883 showing the location of Flora

Flora was a community just northeast of the city of Gainesville, in Alachua County, in the late 19th century. A former colonel in the Union Army, Louis A. Barnes, who had served as sheriff and tax collector for the county, and registrar for the United States General Land Office, laid out a 2,000-acre (810 ha) subdivision between the Florida Transit and Peninsular Railroad and the Live Oak, Tampa and Charlotte Harbor Railroad north of the Gainesville city limits. In 1883, five-acre (2.0 ha) lots were being sold for fruit and vegetable farming. A post office was opened in 1895 and closed in 1896. The community was annexed into the city of Gainesville, beginning in 1905.
