= Fort Clarke, Florida =

Historic community in Alachua County, Florida, US

Coordinates: 29.65974722°N 82.43949167°W

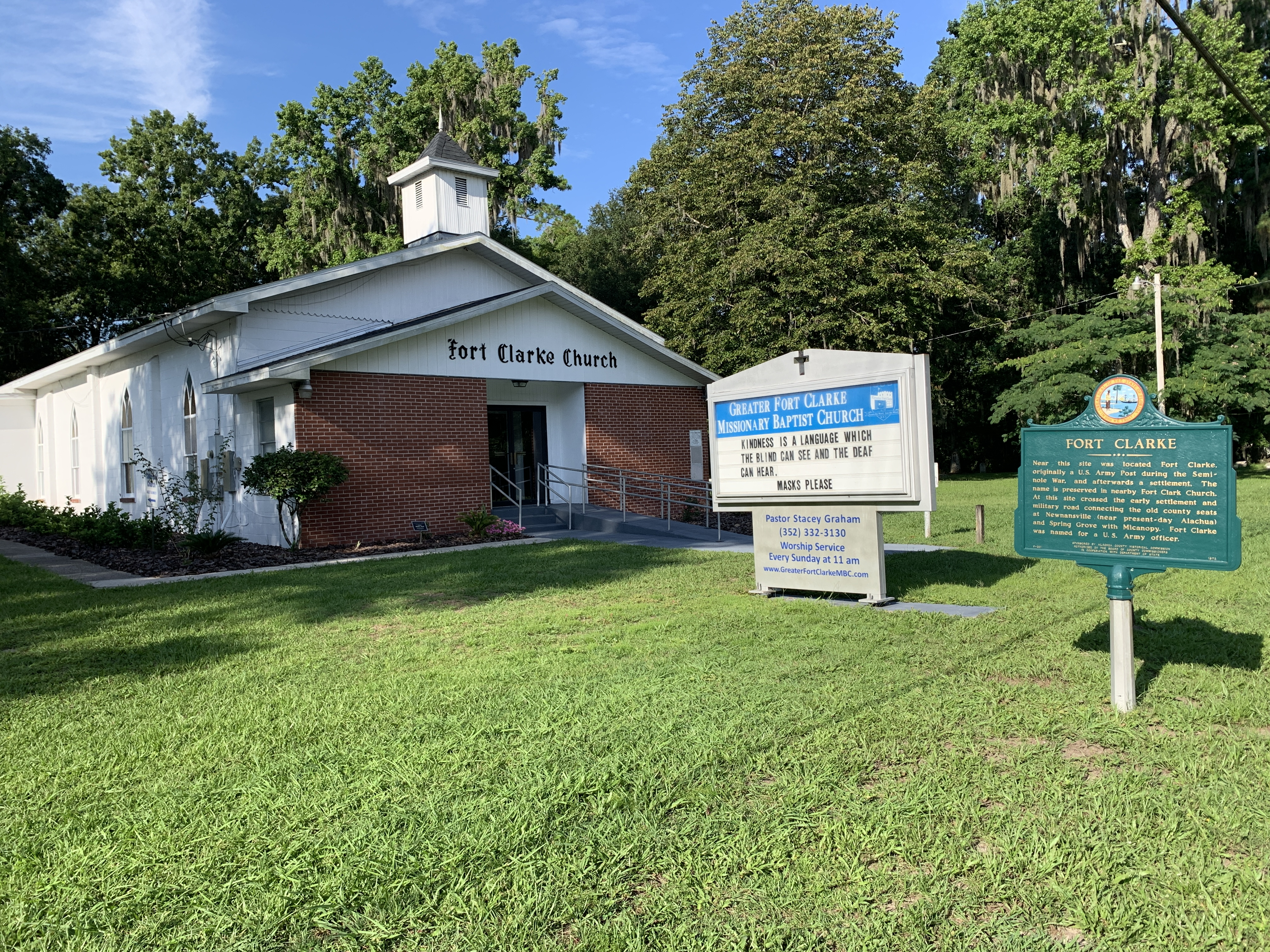
Historic marker and Forte Clarke Church

Fort Clarke was an unincorporated community in central Alachua County, Florida. The fort was established by the US Army during the Second Seminole War. A historical marker commemorates the fort, which was abandoned by the US Army in 1840. In 1841, 16 citizens voted at Fort Clarke on adopting a proposed constitution for Florida. In May 1845, the community was a precinct at which seven residents voted in the election of the state governor and legislators, and the representative to the US House of Representatives, after Florida was admitted to the union as a state. A post office was established in 1846 and closed in 1858. In 1883, John Bevill, who was described as the model farmer of Alachua County, had over 1,000 acres (400 ha) in cultivation at Fort Clarke. Two churches, the Fort Clarke United Methodist Church and the Greater Fort Clarke Missionary Baptist Church, are currently located in the vicinity of the former site of the fort. The site is now part of the urbanized area west of Gainesville.
