= Pinesville, Florida =

Pinesville, Florida is an unincorporated community in Alachua County, Florida, US. The area includes about 230 homes roughly between Archer and Jonesville in western Alachua County.

The area was originally home to a plantation with slaves called Cottonwood. Eventually, the Pinesville area became an African American farming community where watermelon and cantaloupe were farmed. Today, the nearby churches of St. Peter and St. Paul serve as local landmarks, along with the St. Peter's Cemetery. Pinesville remains a small town with a low population density outside of Gainesville.
