= Monteocha, Florida =

Unincorporated community in Alachua County

Coordinates: 29.7963547°N 82.2853832°W

Monteocha is an unincorporated rural community in northern Alachua County, Florida, near the Santa Fe River. A post office was opened in Monteocha in 1889, and closed in 1913. The Homowo-Afi African Cultural and Educational Festival has been held annually in Monteocha since 2005. Alachua County's Monteocha Park is located in the neighboring community of Gordon.

== Maps ==
- "Florida Railroads - Alachua County, 1900". Florida Center for Instructional Technology. 2007.
- "Monteocha, 1936". Florida Center for Instructional Technology. 2008.
