= Spring Grove, Florida =

Former settlement in Florida, US

Spring Grove, Florida was a settlement in Alachua County, Florida during the territorial period in Florida, serving for three years as the county seat of the county. It was about four miles west of Hogtown, probably in the San Felasco Hammock, west or northwest of present-day Gainesville. Four archaeological sites in the San Felasco Hammock Preserve State Park may have been part of Spring Grove. A post office was established in Spring Grove in 1829. In 1835, a unit of volunteer mounted riflemen called the Spring Grove Guards was organized in Alachua County under authority of the Florida territorial council. Most of the 60 or so members were from Spring Grove and Hogtown. The unit ceased operations in less than a year, after the Second Seminole War began. The territorial council designated Spring Grove as the county seat of Alachua County in February 1836. Three years later, in February 1839, the territorial council moved the county seat to Newnansville. The post office closed sometime in 1848.
