= Jonesville, Florida =

Unincorporated community in Florida, U.S.

Jonesville
- Unincorporated community
- Etymology: Named for John Joseph Jones
- Location in Florida
- Coordinates: 29°39′15″N 82°31′23″W
- Country: United States
- State: Florida
- County: Alachua County
- Post office opened: 1875
- Founder: John Joseph Jones

Government
  - Type: None (unincorporated)
- Time zone: UTC-5 (Eastern Time)
  - Summer (DST): UTC-4 (EDT)

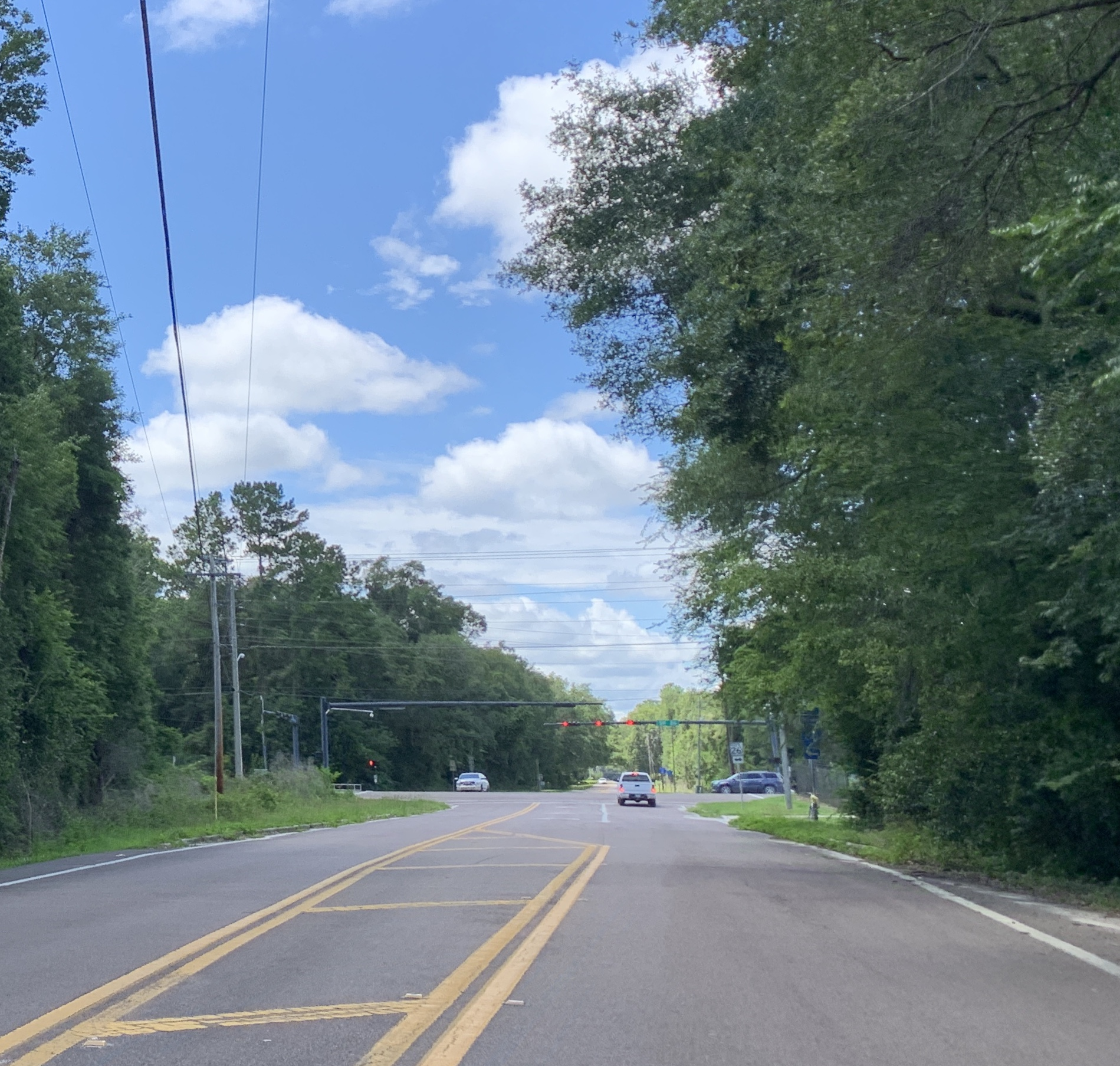
Jonesville, Florida, at the intersection of W Newberry Road and NW 170th Street, June 2020

Jonesville is an unincorporated community in Alachua County, Florida, United States. It is located roughly at the intersection of County Road 241 and State Road 26 (Newberry Road). Jonesville has no city government but is an informal name for a region on Newberry Road between Gainesville and Newberry.

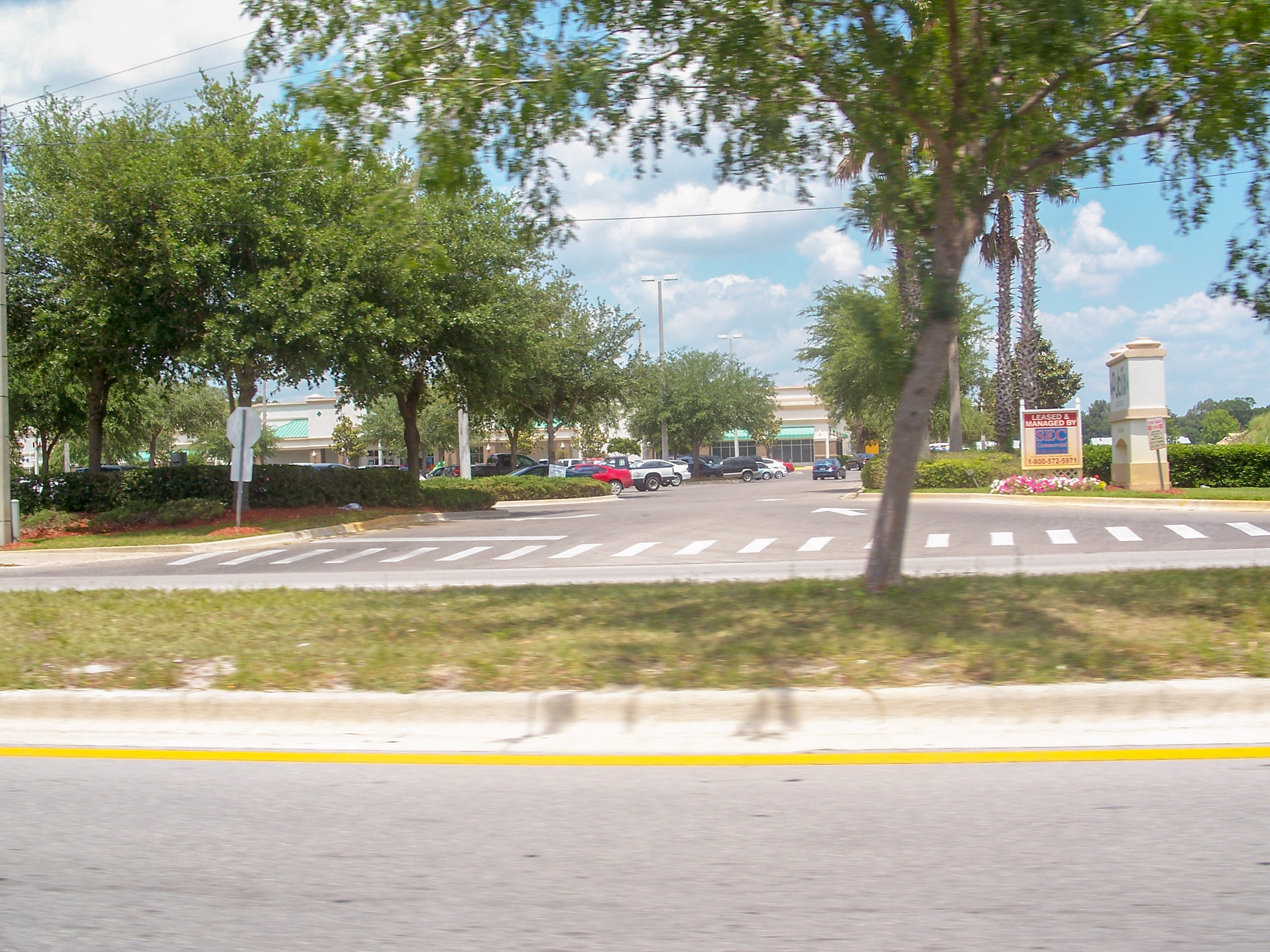
Shopping mall on Florida State Road 235, Jonesville, Florida, May 2009

While no clear delineation has been made for what includes Jonesville, its eastern boundary is 122nd street (colloquially known as Parker Road), due to the City of Gainesville owning up to the eastern side of the road. All the other limits are vague. Jonesville may extend as far west as to 170th St. Approximate northern and southern markers for the region are NW 39th Avenue and SW 8th Avenue, respectively.

Jonesville is named for John Joseph Jones, a young Alabama farmer who moved to this area in the early 1850s, and owned a farm on the south side of the old Newnansville Road. During the Civil War he enlisted as private and later served as 1st lieutenant in the Alachua Rangers, which became C Company of the 7th Florida Volunteer Infantry. After the war he returned to farming. When a post office opened in Jonesville in 1875, John Jones became the first postmaster and this is how the community received the official name of "Jonesville".

== Growth ==
Over the past 40 years, Jonesville has become more populated as the city of Gainesville has continued to grow and residents have moved west towards less dense communities. Coinciding with the growth in the area population, Jonesville has seen an increase in both commercial developments and residential developments.

=== Commercial development ===
Commercial development has rapidly occurred in the 2010s, with new businesses in and around the Steeple Chase shopping plaza. Large-scale commercial developments have included the Town of Tioga development on pre-existing empty fields around the Steeple Chase Shopping Center, and the Arbor Greens center. Additional businesses are expected to move to the area as the population grows. Current agendas include the development of commercial/office space at the intersection of Newberry Road and NW 140th Terrace as well as expansion of commercial land in Town of Tioga.

=== Residential development ===
Many subdivisions have sprung up in the past decade or so in and around the Jonesville area. Older residential neighborhoods have been built since the 1970s. Some of these include Villages of West End, West End Golf View Estates, and Jockey Club. Large, more recent subdivisions include Amelia Fields, Town of Tioga, Arbor Greens, Turnberry Lake, Belmont, Strawberry Fields, and Wyndsong. Apartments and condos are also in the region.

== Infrastructure ==
Jonesville is primarily served by Florida State Road 26, Alachua County Road 241, and SW 8th Avenue.

The Jonesville Park provides local residents with baseball fields, a mile-long track, a disc golf course, tennis courts, soccer fields, and regular play. Future development of the park promises to include a nature center, an event lawn with numerous activities, a BMX track, nature trails, picnic areas, an amphitheater, and a recreation center with gymnasium, weight room and multipurpose rooms.

Alachua County Fire Rescue Station 24 is located just north of Jonesville Park on County Road 241. The station serves the local area, but can be dispatched elsewhere as needed. A new station was built in 2011, and the old station has been abandoned since.
