= Lochloosa, Florida =

- Unincorporated community
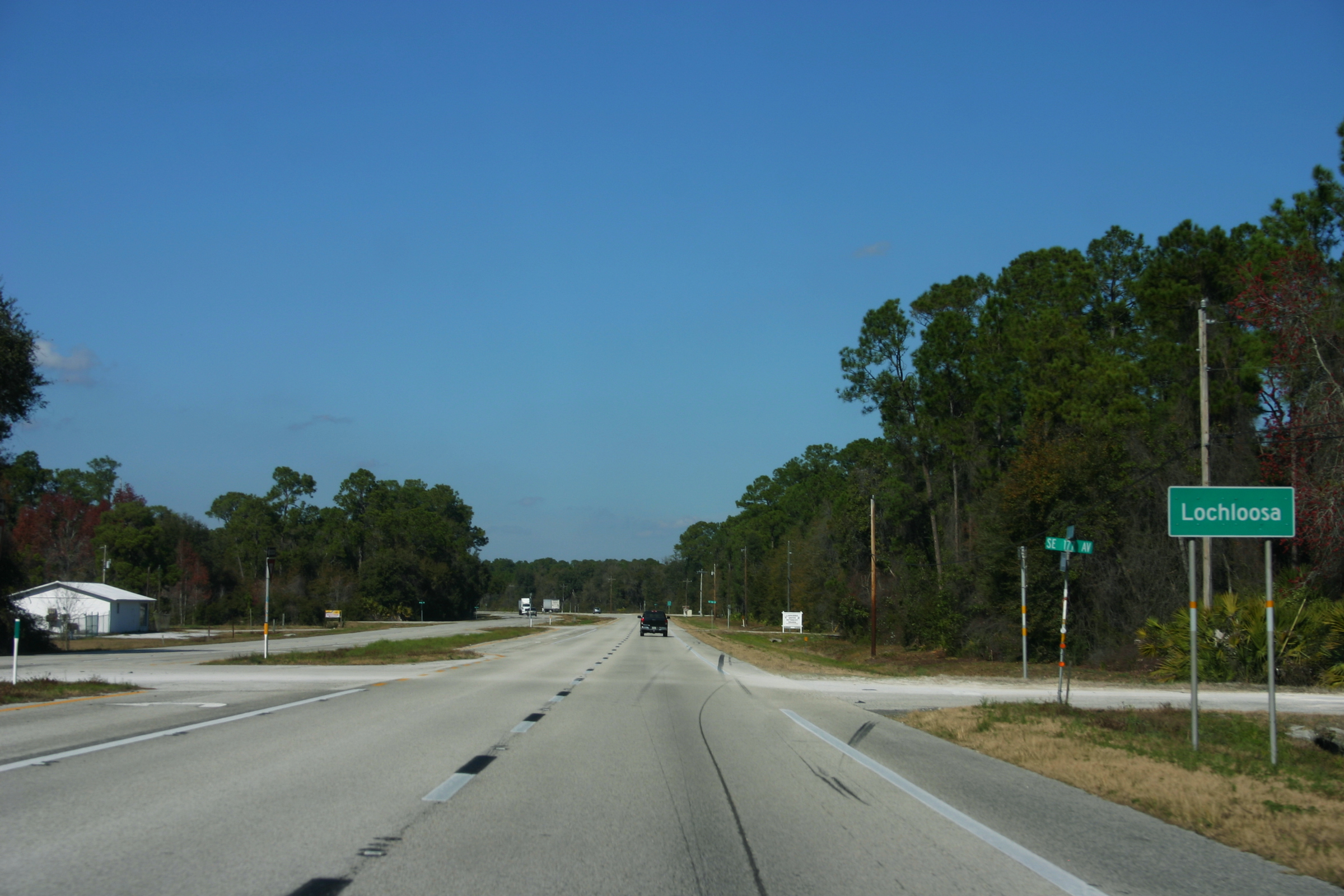
- Northbound on US 301 as it enters Lochloosa

- Location within Florida
- Coordinates: 29°30′42″N 82°06′01″W
- Country: United States
- State: Florida
- County: Alachua
- Elevation: 66 ft (20 m)
- Time zone: UTC-5 (Eastern (EST))
  - Summer (DST): UTC-4 (EDT)
- ZIP code: 32662
- Area code: 352
- GNIS feature ID: 295413

Lochloosa is an unincorporated community in Alachua County, Florida, United States. The community is located on the eastern shore of Lochloosa Lake along U.S. Route 301, 5.6 miles (9.0 km) south of Hawthorne. Lochloosa has a post office with ZIP code 32662, which opened on September 9, 1881.
