= Alachua County Library District =

Public library in Florida

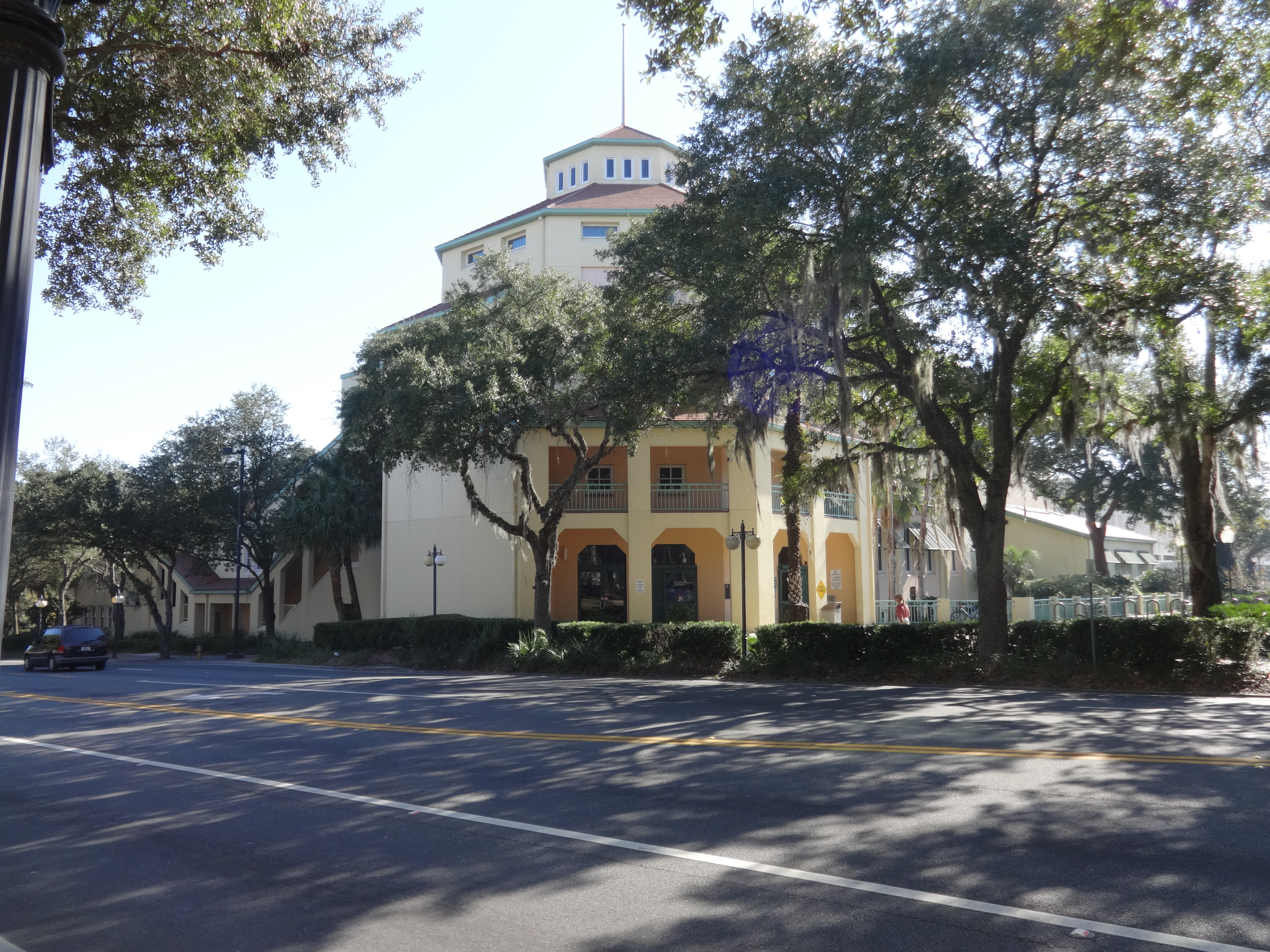
- The Alachua County Library District Headquarters Branch in Gainesville
- 29°39′7.84″N 82°19′7.72″W
- Location: 401 E University Ave, Gainesville, Florida, USA
- Established: 1906
- Branches: 12

Other information
- Website: www.aclib.us

The Alachua County Library District is an independent special taxing district and the sole provider of public library service to approximately 280,000 citizens of Alachua County, Florida. This includes all of the incorporated municipalities in the county. It maintains a headquarters library and four other branches in Gainesville. There are branch locations in seven of the eight other incorporated municipalities in the county. The district also operates a branch at the county jail, and two bookmobiles.

== Locations ==
The Alachua County Library District has twelve locations. The five locations in Gainesville include the headquarters branch in downtown Gainesville, Millhopper Branch in northwest Gainesville, Tower Road Branch in unincorporated Alachua county southwest of Gainesville, Library Partnership Branch in northeast Gainesville, and Cone Park Branch in east Gainesville. The district also operates branches in the Alachua County municipalities of Alachua, Archer, Hawthorne, High Springs, Micanopy, Newberry, and Waldo, and at the Alachua County Jail. The district operates two bookmobiles which visit more than 25 locations in the county from two to five times a month.

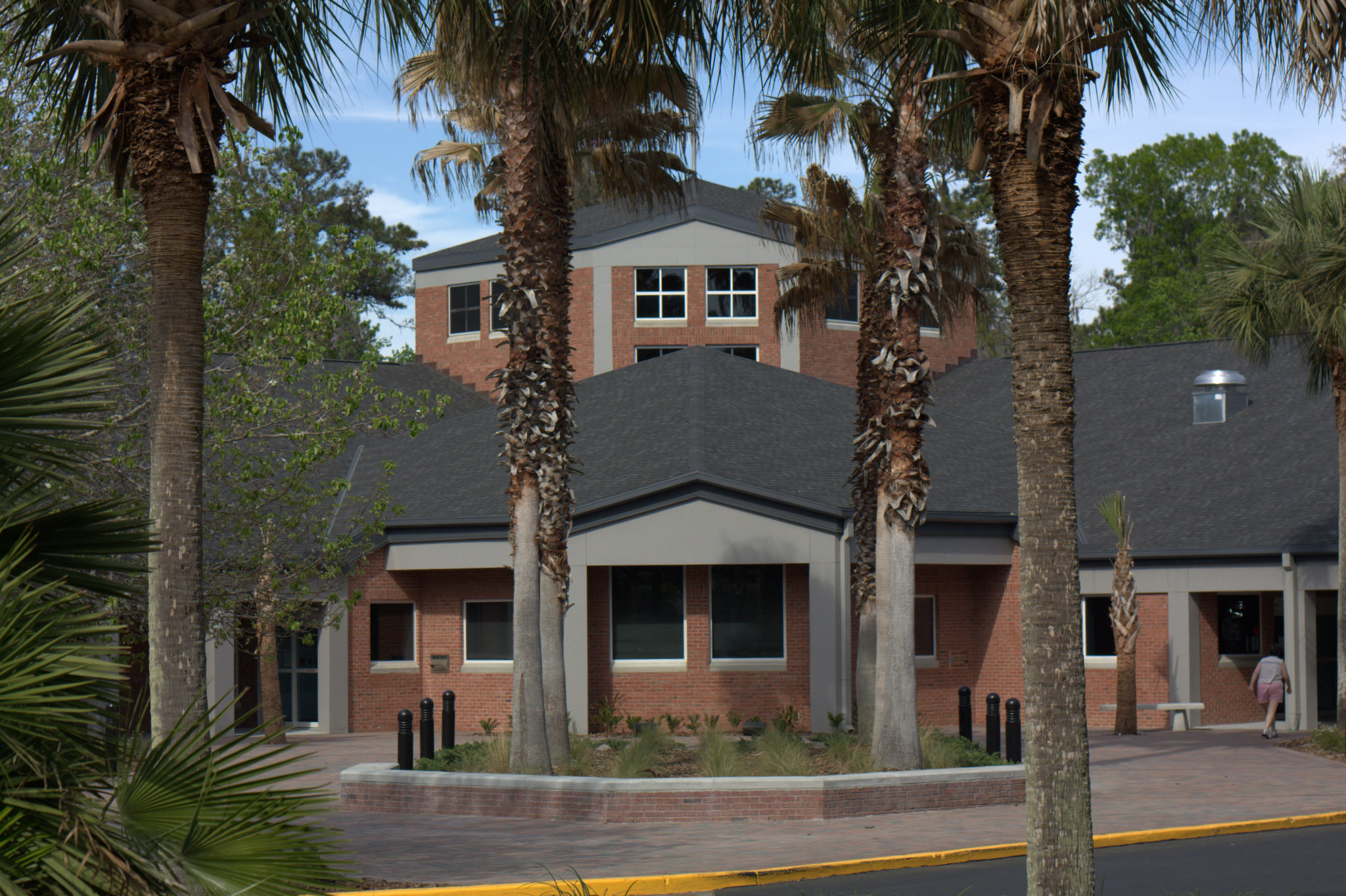
Millhopper Branch Library

Name	Address
Headquarters	401 East University Avenue Gainesville, FL 32601
Alachua	14913 NW 140 Street Alachua, FL 32615
Archer	13266 SW State Road 45 Archer, FL 32618
Cone Park	2801 East University Ave. Gainesville, FL 32641
Hawthorne	6640 SE 221 Street Hawthorne, FL 32640
High Springs	23779 W US HWY 27 High Springs, FL 32643
Library Partnership	912 NE 16th Ave Gainesville, FL 32601
Micanopy	706 NE Cholokka Blvd Micanopy, FL 32667
Millhopper	3145 NW 43rd Street Gainesville, FL 32606
Newberry	110 South Seaboard Drive Newberry, FL 32669
Tower Road	3020 SW 75th Street Gainesville, FL 32608
Waldo	15150 NE US Highway 301 Waldo, FL 32694

== History ==
The Alachua County Library District traces its origins to 1903. A women's group in Gainesville organized a literary society called the Twentieth Century Club. The club issued a call for donated material and money to help initiate the town's first library. By 1905, Gainesville had two subscription libraries, for which a small fee was required. In January 1905, Nora Norton established the Gainesville Circulating Library, held in the Gainesville Sewing Machine company, which required a five dollar a year fee. The Twentieth Century Club opened a library in the Miller Law Exchange with assistance of 200 donated books and a yearly fee of two dollars.

In January 1906, the Gainesville Public Library on West Liberty (now University Avenue) opened with a collection of 800 books, combining books from the Twentieth Century Club, the library of the East Florida Seminary (recently absorbed into the University of Florida), and the Gainesville Circulating Library. However, a small fee was still required. In March, C.W. Chase bought Miss Norton’s 200-book collection and donated it to the new library, bringing all local libraries together under one roof. Hours were 2pm to 5pm Monday to Saturday. Membership was still $2.00 a year.

By 1914 the library moved to several locations, finally ending up at a small building owned by attorney B.A. Thrasher. The Library Association requested assistance from the City Council to make the Gainesville Library a free public library (fees were still 2 dollars a year). To be eligible for Carnegie funds to build a library, the city was required to pay 1000 dollars a year to acquire the deed to 419 East University Avenue. On October 13, 1915, the Gainesville Public Library was established at that location, with the first Library Board including: Dr. A.A. Murphree, Captain C.R. Layton, Hon. W.M. Pepper, Hon. George P. Morris, and Dr. H.W. Cox. The Gainesville Public Library became a free library in 1918, supported by funds from city taxes, and in a building constructed with the aid of a Carnegie grant. The library became a department of the City of Gainesville in 1949. A branch of the Gainesville Public Library, the Carver Branch Library, was opened in 1953 to provide library services to the African-American population of Gainesville. The Carver Branch closed in 1969, after the main library had been desegregated. In 1958, the City of Gainesville and Alachua County agreed to jointly operate the library for the whole county.

Branch libraries were opened in High Springs, Hawthorne and Micanopy the next year, and a bookmobile was put into service. Alachua County joined with Bradford County to operate the Santa Fe Regional Library. After Bradford County withdrew from the Regional Library, the Alachua County Library District was formally established in 1986. In 1987 funds were approved by vote for a new main library. After being postponed due to asbestos, construction of the new 78,000 sq. ft. library headquarters was underway. In 1991 the new Alachua County Library District headquarters building was opened.

The Millhopper and Tower Road branches opened in 1992, and the branches in Alachua, Archer, Newberry and Waldo were all opened by 1997. In 2008, the Alachua branch underwent a $1.5 million renovation and expansion project that saw the library's size double to 10,000 square feet and included the addition of a drive-up window and specialized areas for both young children and teenagers. The Library Partnership Branch opened in 2009 and the Cone Park Branch in 2011. A new, permanent location for the Cone Park Branch Library was opened near the Eastside Community Center in Gainesville on December 14, 2013. In 2015, Headquarters branch celebrated 25 years - with an estimated 3.8 million items checked out that year. In 2016, High Springs branch added 3,000 square feet to their original building. In January 2017, the Tower Road Branch library began undergoing renovations to add 8,500 square feet of space, which would include additions of a quiet reading room, three study rooms, new restrooms and an expanded children's area, among other features.

== Library cards ==
Library cards are free to any resident of the State of Florida and to non-residents who own property in Florida. A potential user must register in person with proper identification and proof of residency or of ownership of property in the state. Digital library cards are available for residents 18 and older, these only provide access to the digital collections and online resources. The registration of a minor requires the parent or legal guardian to have their own ID plus an acceptable form of ID for the child. Acceptable forms of identification for a minor include:

- Health insurance card
- School report card
- School immunization record
- Social Security card
- Birth certificate
- Passport

Library card renewal is required every two years and must be done in person with a photo ID and proof of mailing address. A patron must have a $0 account balance in order to renew a card.

Alachua County residents are eligible for free library cards from 12 counties: Baker, Bradford, Clay, Columbia, Dixie, Gilchrist, Lafayette, Levy, Marion, Putnam, St. Johns, and Union counties.

=== Student library cards ===
In 2018 The Alachua County Library District and Alachua County Public Schools partnered in a new initiative aimed at expanding access by providing students in public schools with their own library card for free. More than 27,000 cards were distributed the first year of the program. The program was then continued into the 2019-2020 school year and expanded to include students at P.K. Yonge Developmental Research School. Student cards allowed for:

- Checking out 3 Print or Audiobooks
- Borrowing eBooks, downloadable music and digital magazines
- Using e-sources, including tutoring help and research resources.
- Logging on to computers at any of the Library District’s 12 branches.

Students new to the program received a welcome letter along with the card at the school and then are able to use the library card to access services online as well as in the branches. Although the Alachua County Library District charges no late fees, students were still expected to return materials and parents may receive a quarterly statement from the library for anything not returned.

Student cards expired December 31, 2022 and the program has not been continued.

== Checkouts and returns ==
Library card holders can check out and return items at any branch located in Alachua County, including the two bookmobiles. Total checkout is limited to 100 items. Books and audiobooks check out for 4 weeks. Music CDs and DVDs check out for 2 weeks. Items may be renewed twice, as long as they are not on hold for another patron. Audiobooks, eBooks, music, TV shows and movies are available to library card holders as downloadable digital media from the district's website.

If a library card holder wishes to check out an item that is not currently available, the card holder may place a hold request on that item through the online catalog. By entering a library card number, a patron can then choose the branch that the patron wishes to have the item delivered to once it becomes available.

The Library District does not have late fees. However, five or more overdue items or $50.00 worth of overdue materials will block borrowing privileges until the items are returned or paid for. Additionally, any items returned by patrons with damaged or missing parts will result in a standard replacement charge for that individual.

== Services ==
Apart from library card privileges, the Alachua County Library District branches offer other services including meeting rooms, events for all ages, ebooks, audiobooks, computer access, free mp3 downloads, downloadable magazines, Wi-Fi, printing, interlibrary loans, proctoring, and literacy tutoring for adults and ESOL learners. A Seed Library is available at every location offering a variety of vegetable, herb, and flower seeds that change based on donations. Mobile hotspots are available to be checked out through the WiFi2Go program, allowing card holders to check out one hotspot per card for a week. A few kits are also available for borrowing throughout the library district, these include Birding Kits, STEM Kits for children of varying ages, and Sensory Toys appropriate for infants and children three years and older. Working with the University of Florida's Center for Autism and Related Disabilities, the Library District offers sensory storytime, a special storytime open to all children but designed to serve children with sensory integration challenges. The library district also offers mailing services of print and other materials to the homebound of Alachua County. Additionally, multiple branch locations have served as polling locations during Alachua County elections. The library's website also provides assistance with re-employment by linking patrons to CONNECT claims processing form and the Florida re-employment assistance claim form.

== Library support ==
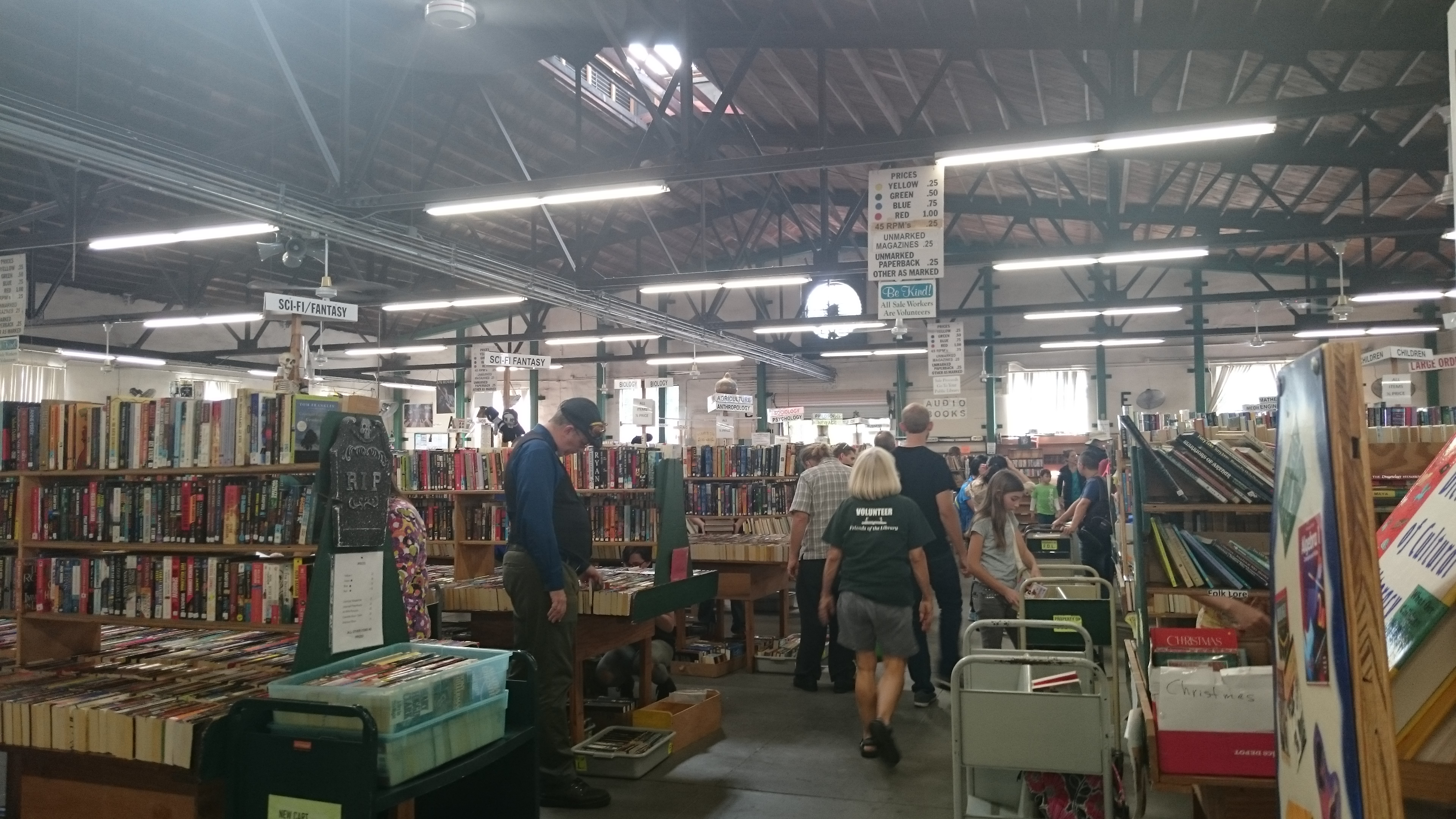
The Friends of the Library fall book sale, October 25, 2016.

The Library District is supported by the Friends of the Library (established in 1954) with a bi-annual book sale, usually in October and April. The Friends of the Library book sale is the largest of its kind in the state of Florida, with 500,000 books, magazines, videos, puzzles, games, and more available for sale. The book sale also has a Collector's Corner, which specializes in rare books, including first editions, signed copies, and Florida-related materials. The sale offers more than 64 categories of books, including general fiction, classics, cookbooks, children's and young adult fiction, and comic books. Proceeds from the sale fund different programs benefiting the Alachua County Library District. In 2015-2016, the book sale proceeds funded $150,000 in direct support to the library district for adult and children's programming, for purchasing library materials, and for other needs. The library also raised scholarship funds for library personnel to complete their Master of Library and Information Science degrees. The Friends of the Library also helped fund a variety of literacy projects, including the Family Literacy Festival, distribution of books for Head Start programs, and mini-grants for local literacy organizations.

The library district is also supported by the ACLD Foundation, which raises money through the sale of name plaques and author galas.

== Recognition ==
- The Alachua County Library District was co-recipient of the Florida Library Association 2010 Library of the Year Award.
- The Library Partnership branch was selected for the Ash Center for Democratic Governance and Innovation Bright Ideas program in 2010.
- Sol Hirsch, Director of the district (2004-2011), received the 2011 Peggy Sullivan Award for Public Library Administrators Supporting Services to Children from the American Library Association.
- The district was one of five libraries and five museums to receive the 2011 National Medal for Museum and Library Service awarded by the Institute of Museum and Library Services.
- The Alachua County Library District received the Betty Davis Miller Youth Services - Children award at the Florida Library Association annual conference in 2016 for their Sensory Storytime program for children on the autism spectrum.
