= Hector McLean Grady =

American politician (1873–1964)

Hector McLean Grady (December 13, 1873 – September 16, 1964) was an American politician and prominent early businessman and citizen of High Springs, Florida. He served in the Florida House of Representatives from 1929 to 1931, the Alachua County Commission from 1921 to 1923 and 1937 to 1939, and on the High Springs City Commission from 1912 to 1913 and 1926 to 1936, including eight years as mayor. He was longtime owner of the Grady House in High Springs, listed on the National Register of Historic Places.
