= William Eugene Whitlock =

American politician (1911–1997)

William Eugene Whitlock II (August 18, 1911 - December 31, 1997) was an American politician from High Springs, Florida. He was a member of the Florida House of Representatives from 1949 - 1953. He led the Florida House in selecting Gainesville, Florida and the University of Florida as the location for the first state medical and dental school.
