= High Springs, Florida =

- City
- City of High Springs
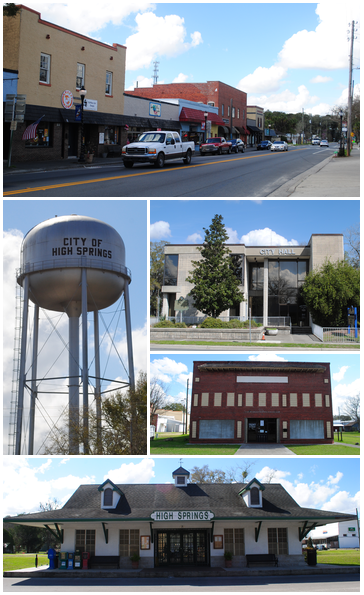
- Top, left to right: downtown area, water tower, city hall, Priest Theatre, old railroad depot

- Seal

- Location in Alachua County and the state of Florida
- Coordinates: 29°46′30″N 82°37′20″W
- Country: United States
- State: Florida
- County: Alachua
- Settled: ca. 1840
- Incorporated: 1892

Government
  - Type: Commission–Manager

Area
  - Total: 21.97 sq mi (56.89 km^{2})
  - Land: 21.89 sq mi (56.69 km^{2})
  - Water: 0.077 sq mi (0.20 km^{2})
- Elevation: 72 ft (22 m)

Population (2020)
  - Total: 6,215
  - Density: 283.9/sq mi (109.63/km^{2})
- Time zone: UTC-5 (Eastern (EST))
  - Summer (DST): UTC-4 (EDT)
- ZIP codes: 32643, 32655
- Area code: 386
- FIPS code: 12-30525
- GNIS feature ID: 2404697
- Website: www.highsprings.gov

High Springs is a city in Alachua County, Florida, United States. It is the fourth-largest city in Alachua County and seventh-largest in North Central Florida. The population was 6,215 at the 2020 census, up from 5,350 at the 2010 census. It is part of the Gainesville, Florida Metropolitan Statistical Area.

== History ==
The present-day area of High Springs was first settled on a permanent basis by English-speaking people during the late 1830s. One of the earliest settlements in the vicinity was at Crockett Springs, located about three miles east of present-day High Springs. Settlers who were living there during the 1840s included Fernando Underwood and Marshal Blanton.

A discernible town began to develop in the early 1880s after the Savannah, Florida & Western Railway was constructed and several phosphate mines were established. A railroad station and a post office called Santaffey were established in 1884. The post office was renamed Santa Fe a few months later, then Orion the next year, and in 1888 it became High Springs, and the town was officially incorporated in 1892. The town, now a city, had a population over 1,500 at the end of the 1890s and was the second largest by population in the county.

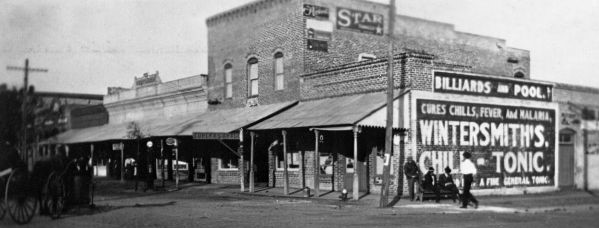
Business district in 1916

== Geography ==
According to the United States Census Bureau, the city has a total area of 22.0 square miles (57.1 km^{2}), of which 22.0 square miles (56.9 km^{2}) is land and 0.077 square miles (0.2 km^{2}) (0.36%) is water.

=== Climate ===
High Springs has a humid subtropical climate (Cfa).

Climate data for High Springs, Florida, 1991–2020 normals, extremes 1944–2015
Month	Jan	Feb	Mar	Apr	May	Jun	Jul	Aug	Sep	Oct	Nov	Dec	Year
Record high °F (°C)	87 (31)	89 (32)	97 (36)	96 (36)	104 (40)	104 (40)	107 (42)	104 (40)	99 (37)	99 (37)	95 (35)	89 (32)	107 (42)
Mean maximum °F (°C)	80.3 (26.8)	82.9 (28.3)	87.0 (30.6)	91.3 (32.9)	95.4 (35.2)	97.7 (36.5)	97.9 (36.6)	97.2 (36.2)	95.0 (35.0)	91.2 (32.9)	85.7 (29.8)	82.1 (27.8)	99.2 (37.3)
Mean daily maximum °F (°C)	66.7 (19.3)	70.0 (21.1)	76.1 (24.5)	82.0 (27.8)	87.8 (31.0)	90.4 (32.4)	91.8 (33.2)	90.8 (32.7)	88.5 (31.4)	82.2 (27.9)	75.2 (24.0)	69.1 (20.6)	80.9 (27.2)
Daily mean °F (°C)	53.2 (11.8)	56.0 (13.3)	61.3 (16.3)	67.2 (19.6)	74.9 (23.8)	79.7 (26.5)	81.1 (27.3)	81.0 (27.2)	78.1 (25.6)	69.9 (21.1)	61.7 (16.5)	55.5 (13.1)	68.3 (20.2)
Mean daily minimum °F (°C)	39.8 (4.3)	41.9 (5.5)	46.5 (8.1)	52.4 (11.3)	61.9 (16.6)	68.9 (20.5)	70.4 (21.3)	71.1 (21.7)	67.7 (19.8)	57.7 (14.3)	48.2 (9.0)	41.8 (5.4)	55.7 (13.2)
Mean minimum °F (°C)	22.1 (−5.5)	25.5 (−3.6)	30.9 (−0.6)	37.6 (3.1)	49.1 (9.5)	61.6 (16.4)	65.4 (18.6)	65.8 (18.8)	56.2 (13.4)	40.8 (4.9)	30.8 (−0.7)	24.4 (−4.2)	19.0 (−7.2)
Record low °F (°C)	9 (−13)	17 (−8)	20 (−7)	31 (−1)	40 (4)	44 (7)	55 (13)	58 (14)	37 (3)	29 (−2)	15 (−9)	8 (−13)	8 (−13)
Average precipitation inches (mm)	3.68 (93)	3.14 (80)	3.90 (99)	2.77 (70)	3.43 (87)	6.74 (171)	7.10 (180)	7.19 (183)	5.45 (138)	3.46 (88)	2.18 (55)	2.64 (67)	51.68 (1,313)
Average precipitation days (≥ 0.01 in)	8.6	8.1	8.0	5.7	7.0	13.9	14.6	15.8	10.3	6.9	5.9	7.5	112.3
Source: NOAA (mean maxima/minima 1981–2010)

== Demographics ==
Historical population
Census	Pop.	Note	%±
1900	1,562		—
1910	1,468		−6.0%
1920	1,719		17.1%
1930	1,864		8.4%
1940	2,010		7.8%
1950	2,088		3.9%
1960	2,329		11.5%
1970	2,787		19.7%
1980	2,491		−10.6%
1990	3,144		26.2%
2000	3,863		22.9%
2010	5,350		38.5%
2020	6,215		16.2%
U.S. Decennial Census

=== Racial and ethnic composition ===
High Springs racial composition (Hispanics excluded from racial categories) (NH = Non-Hispanic)
Race	Pop 2010	Pop 2020	% 2010	% 2020
White (NH)	4,116	4,503	76.93%	72.45%
Black or African American (NH)	730	728	13.64%	11.71%
Native American or Alaska Native (NH)	23	16	0.43%	0.26%
Asian (NH)	38	44	0.71%	0.71%
Pacific Islander or Native Hawaiian (NH)	6	0	0.11%	0.00%
Some other race (NH)	8	35	0.15%	0.56%
Two or more races/Multiracial (NH)	76	284	1.42%	4.57%
Hispanic or Latino (any race)	353	605	6.60%	9.73%
Total	5,350	6,215		

=== 2020 census ===
As of the 2020 census, High Springs had a population of 6,215. The median age was 39.7 years. 23.9% of residents were under the age of 18 and 17.6% of residents were 65 years of age or older. For every 100 females there were 93.9 males, and for every 100 females age 18 and over there were 89.7 males age 18 and over.

0.0% of residents lived in urban areas, while 100.0% lived in rural areas.

There were 2,404 households in High Springs, of which 35.3% had children under the age of 18 living in them. Of all households, 54.2% were married-couple households, 14.1% were households with a male householder and no spouse or partner present, and 26.4% were households with a female householder and no spouse or partner present. About 21.8% of all households were made up of individuals and 9.1% had someone living alone who was 65 years of age or older.

There were 2,576 housing units, of which 6.7% were vacant. The homeowner vacancy rate was 2.0% and the rental vacancy rate was 5.3%.

=== Demographic estimates ===
In 2020 ACS 5-year estimates, there were 1,424 families residing in the city.

=== 2010 census ===
As of the 2010 census, there were 5,350 people, 1,781 households, and 1,502 families residing in the city.

=== 2000 census ===
As of the census of 2000, there were 3,863 people, 1,539 households, and 1,063 families residing in the city. The population density was 209.3 inhabitants per square mile (80.8/km^{2}). There were 1,668 housing units at an average density of 90.4 units per square mile (34.9 units/km^{2}). The racial makeup of the city was 76.42% White, 21.18% African American, 0.39% Native American, 0.34% Asian, 0.31% from other races, and 1.37% from two or more races. Hispanic or Latino of any race.

In 2000, there were 1,539 households, out of which 32.1% had children under the age of 18 living with them, 50.3% were married couples living together, 14.5% had a female householder with no husband present, and 30.9% were non-families. 25.9% of all households were made up of individuals, and 12.3% had someone living alone who was 65 years of age or older. The average household size was 2.47 and the average family size was 2.98.

In 2000, in the city, the population was spread out, with 25.4% under the age of 18, 6.2% from 18 to 24, 27.6% from 25 to 44, 25.0% from 45 to 64, and 15.7% who were 65 years of age or older. The median age was 39 years. For every 100 females, there were 85.5 males. For every 100 females age 18 and over, there were 81.4 males.

In 2000, the median income for a household in the city was $34,354, and the median income for a family was $43,779. Males had a median income of $32,959 versus $22,109 for females. The per capita income for the city was $15,919. About 9.5% of families and 12.0% of the population were below the poverty line, including 17.8% of those under age 18 and 9.6% of those age 65 or over. On many days during the week, hundreds of cars are lined up in the city's downtown for a free food distribution.

== Education ==
The Alachua County Public Schools operates a kindergarten through eighth grade school, the High Springs Community School, in High Springs. Ninth through twelfth grade students attend Santa Fe High School in the adjoining city of Alachua.

== Library ==
The Alachua County Library District operates a branch library on NW 1st Avenue in downtown, High Springs. The library is open 7 days a week, provides regular programming for all ages, and circulates print books, audiobooks, music CDs, and DVDs. Free computer and internet access is available to all patrons.

In 1958, the North Florida Telephone Company offered the loan of its vacant building to the High Springs Parent-Teacher Association for the creation of the first Alachua County branch library located outside of Gainesville. The High Springs Library opened at this location the following year. After years of community fund raising, ground was broken in 1976 for a new 3,000 sq. ft. library building. The second and current library location opened its doors on January 3, 1977. Children from High Springs formed a block-long human chain to move the book collection from the old library to the new one.

== Notable people ==
- Ellis Amburn, book editor and biographer
- Hector McLean Grady, former Florida congressman
- Myril Hoag, former MLB All-Star
- Charlie Huggins, former President of the Alaska State Senate
- Burton H. Rawls, former Florida congressman
- Wes Skiles, cave diving explorer and cinematographer
- William Eugene Whitlock, former Florida congressman
