= Hogtown, Florida =

Former human settlement in Florida, US

Coordinates: 29.64797°N 82.32464°W

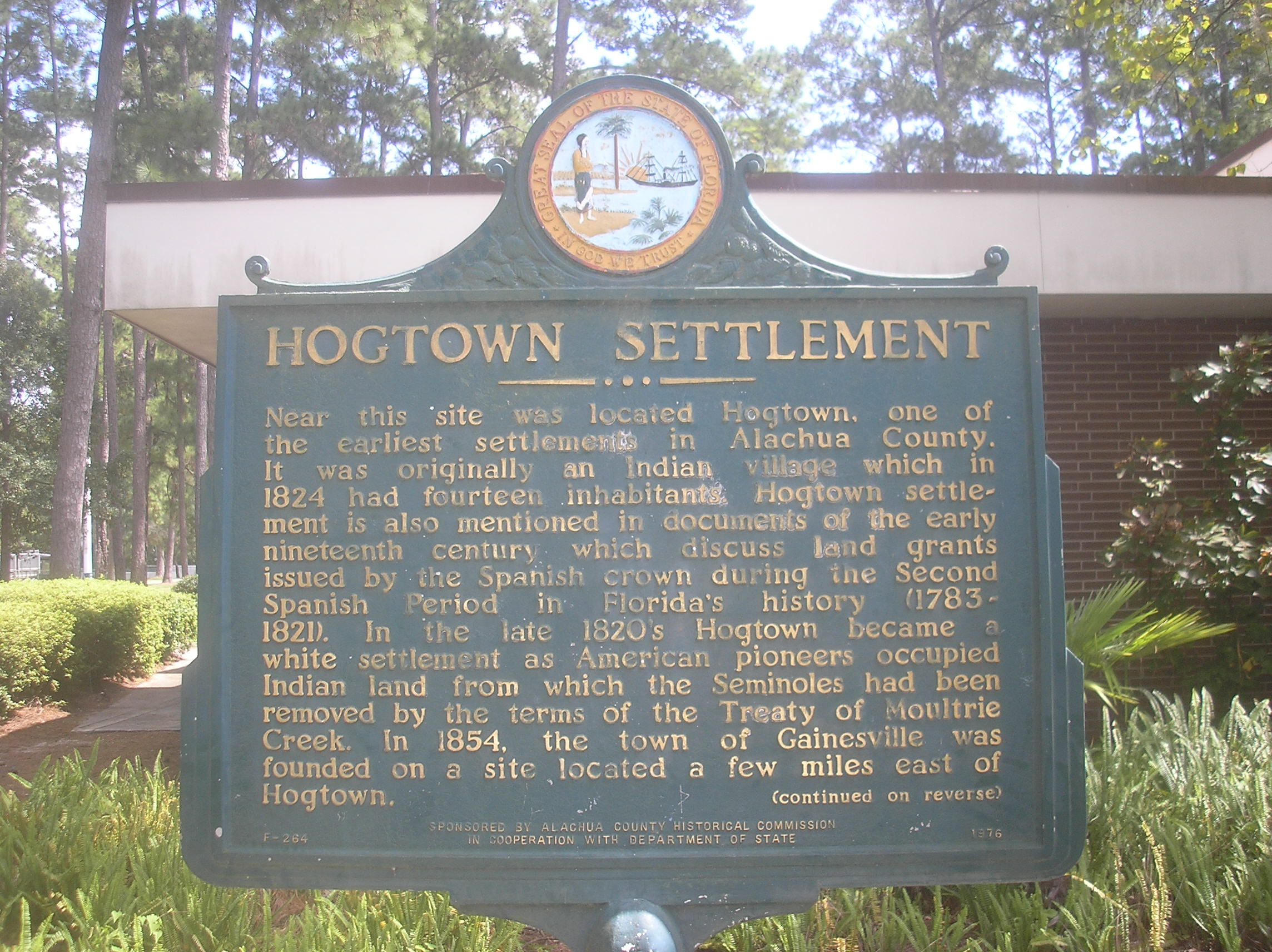
Obverse of the historical marker in front of the Westside Recreation Center

Hogtown was a 19th-century settlement in and around what is now Westside Park in Gainesville, Florida, United States (in the northeast corner of the intersection of NW 8th Avenue and 34th Street) where a historical marker notes Hogtown's location at that site and is the eponymous outpost of the adjacent Hogtown Creek. Originally a village of Seminoles who raised hogs, the habitation was dubbed "Hogtown" by nearby white people who traded with the Seminoles. Indian artifacts were found at Glen Springs, which empties into Hogtown Creek.

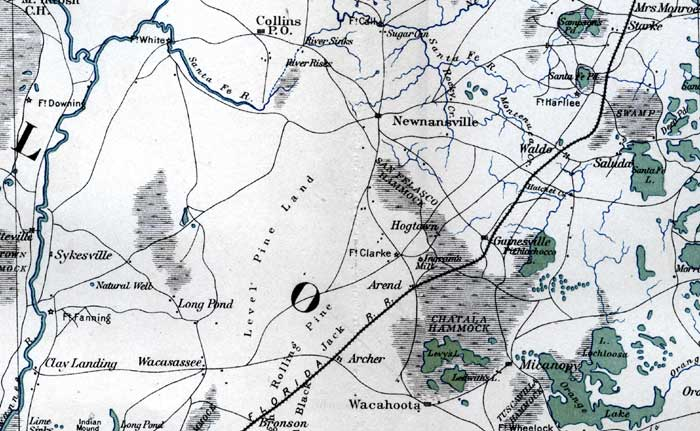
Detail of map showing location of Hogtown in relation to Gainesville in 1865

== History ==
In 1824, Hogtown's population was 14. After the acquisition of Florida by the United States, white settlers began moving into the area. The 1823 Treaty of Moultrie Creek obliged the Seminoles to move to a reservation in central Florida. Under the terms of the treaty, Chief John Mico received $20 as compensation for the "improvements" the Seminoles had made in Hogtown.

The 1832 Treaty of Payne's Landing required the Seminoles in Florida to move to west of the Mississippi River after three years. Most of the Seminoles did not want to leave Florida. As the deadline for the start of the removal approached, tensions increased in Florida. A militia unit called the Spring Grove Guards (Spring Grove was about 4 miles (6 km) west of Hogtown) was organized in Spring 1835, with many of its 60 or so members living in Hogtown. In June 1835 there occurred an incident called the "Murder of Hogtown" (not to be confused with a work of fiction so titled): A party of seven or eight Seminoles were hunting off of their reservation which ended near what is now Ocala, FL. During this hunt they killed a cow and made camp near Hogtown. A group of whites found five or six of the Seminoles at their camp, seized their weapons, and began whipping the Seminoles. The other two Seminoles returned to the camp, and seeing their fellows being whipped, opened fire on the whites. In the ensuing fight, three of the whites were wounded, one Seminole was killed, and another Seminole was reported to have been mortally wounded. (Some of the whites were members of the Spring Grove Guards, but were not on duty at the time.) Indian Agent Wiley Thompson demanded the surrender of the surviving Seminoles, and they were turned over to government custody for trial. There is no record of a trial occurring, however, reportedly because the whites involved did not want their actions examined in court. In August, Private Kinsley Dalton was killed while carrying the mail from Fort Brooke (Tampa) to Fort King (Ocala), allegedly in retaliation for the Seminoles killed at Hogtown.

Following the start of the Second Seminole War in late December 1835, white settlers throughout Florida left their homes or took steps to protect themselves. The residents of Hogtown built a fortification called "Fort Hogtown".

In 1961, the City of Gainesville annexed the former site of Hogtown.

As noted by Steve Rajtar in "Guide to Historic Gainesville",

Some consider Hogtown to be the earliest name of what is now known as Gainesville. Most historians, however, consider them to be two separate communities, with Gainesville being the first and only name of the present city.

Nonetheless, colloquially, "Hogtown" is often used as a synonym for Gainesville and many Gainesville businesses and events identify themselves as "Hogtown".
