= Tioga, Florida =

Town in Alachua County, Florida, US

Coordinates: 29.653°N 82.481°W

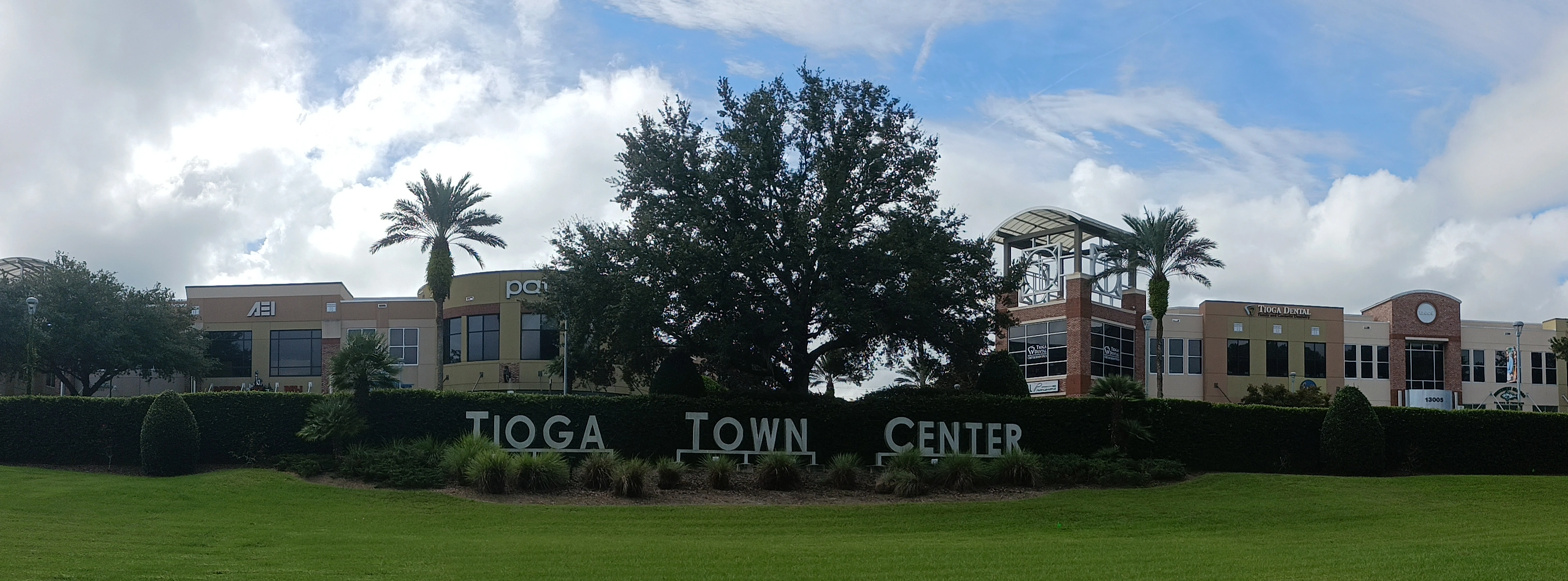
The front of the Tioga Town Center (October 2024)

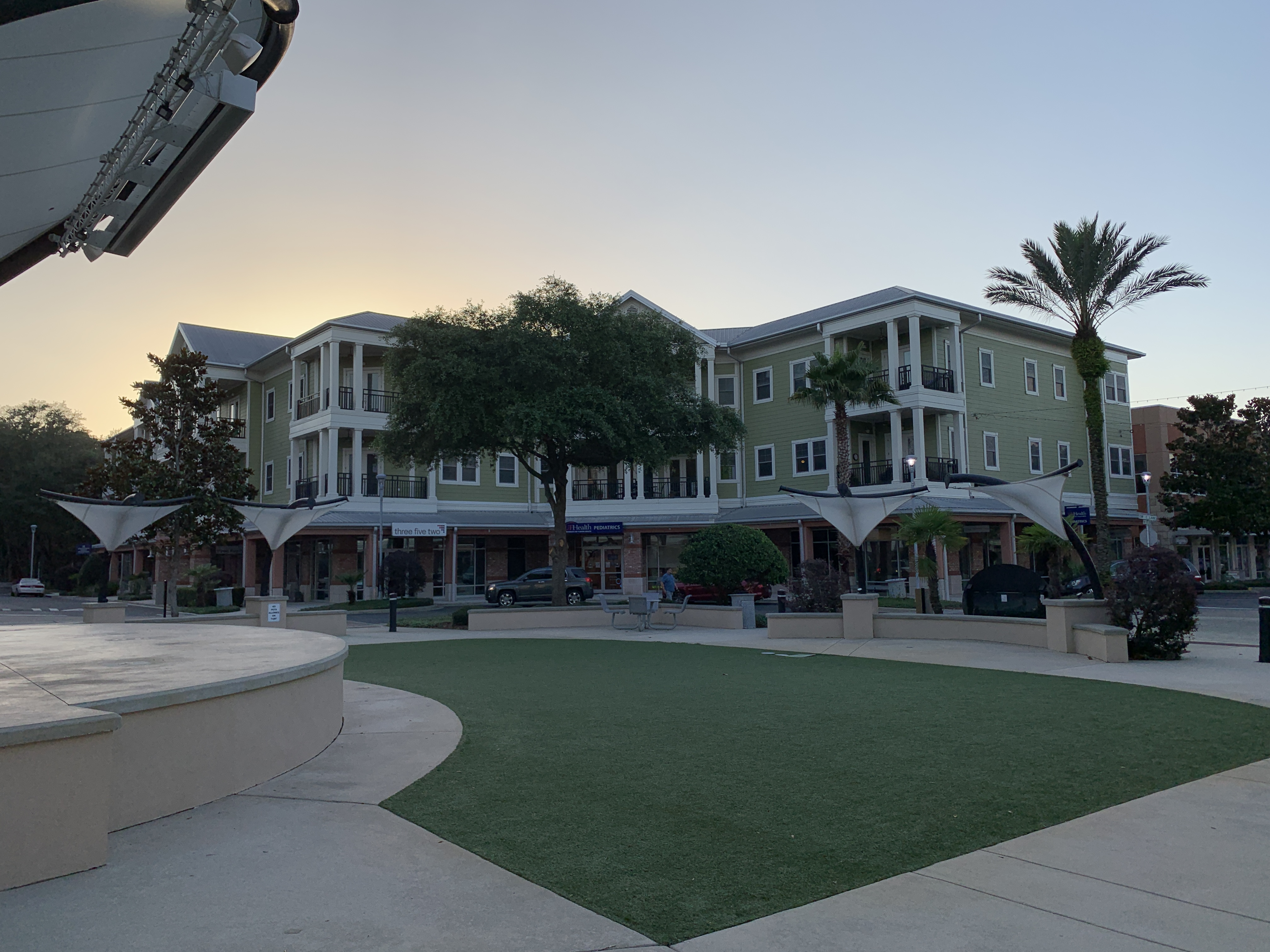
Inside the Tioga Town Center (June 2020)

Tioga is a mixed-use development located about three miles west of Gainesville in unincorporated Alachua County, Florida, United States.

Tioga can be found along Florida State Road 26 east of the overlap with County Road 241.

== History ==
=== Tioga Town Center ===
The Tioga Town Center was opened in 2004.

== Demographics ==
In 2013, the Tioga area had an average household income of $84,487 and an average age of 37.45 years. By comparison, Alachua County as a whole had an average household income of $38,075 and an average age of 29.00 years.
