= Florida State Road 121 =

Highway in Florida

State Road 121
- Florida State Road 121 highlighted in red

Route information
- Maintained by FDOT
- Length: 101.867 mi (163.939 km)
- Tourist routes: Woodpecker Trail

Major junctions
- South end: US 19 / US 98 / CR 336 at Lebanon Station
- US 27 / US 41 in Williston; I-75 in Gainesville; SR 16 in Raiford; I-10 in Macclenny
- North end: SR 23 / SR 121 near Stokesville, GA

Location
- Country: United States
- State: Florida

Highway system
- Florida State Highway System; Interstate; US; State; Former; Pre‑1945; Toll; Scenic
← SR 120	→ SR 122

State Road 121 (SR 121) is a major state highway that runs north and south in northern Florida.

== Route description ==
SR 121 is one of the major routes of a three-state highway 121 that totals approximately 475 miles (764 km) from Lebanon Station, Florida, to Rock Hill, South Carolina.

Beginning in Lebanon Station at a channelized intersection with US 19/US 98 and County Road 336 (CR 336) in Levy County, SR 121 travels through Goethe State Forest where it turns east and intersects CR 337. The road makes a sharp left curve to the northeast where it travels through desolate farmland; the only resemblance to a major intersection is CR 326. Within the city of Williston, SR 121 has a concurrency with CR 316, until the intersection with US 41. It then joins US 41 as CR 316 continues eastward, which then joins the east end of US 27 Alternate (US 27 Alt.), and then the US 27/US 41 concurrency before breaking away to the northeast again, taking the DeSoto Trail away from US 41.

North of CR 335, SR 121 hugs the west side of the Levy–Marion county line, but never crosses it, choosing to enter Alachua County instead. Immediately after the interchange with Interstate 75 (I-75) at exit 382, SR 121 makes a sharp left onto Northwest 34th Street as SR 331 becomes the designation for Williston Road. As it crosses SR 24 it borders the western edge of the University of Florida, passing along the 34th Street Wall just before crossing SR 26A and then SR 26. North of US 441, the DeSoto Trail breaks away.

Within the town of LaCrosse, SR 121 shares a short concurrency with SR 235, then has a level crossing with the CSX Brooker Subdivision, a former Seaboard Coast Line railroad line that leads to the Crystal River 3 Nuclear Power Plant. After the intersection with CR 236 in Santa Fe, SR 121 passes by entrances to the Santa Fe River Preserve, and then is carried along a bridge over the Santa Fe River in Worthington Springs, where it intersects SR 18. North of CR 18, the road is carried along a bridge over the former Jacksonville and Southwestern Railroad.

Briefly traveling parallel to SR 100 in Lake Butler, it intersects SR 100 as it continues northeast. The road also runs parallel to another rail-trail along the former Jacksonville and Southwestern right-of-way in Raiford, then serves as the western terminus of SR 16 before leaving that community. After passing by the Northeast Florida State Hospital, the road intersects I-10 (Exit 335) and US 90 in Macclenny close to SR 228 before crossing the Georgia state line on its way to Rock Hill, South Carolina.

== History ==
The segment between US 19 and 98 in Lebanon Station and US 41 in Williston was previously designated as Florida State Road 335, and the segment between US 27 and 41 in Williston, at what is today the south end of SR 331 was part of a southern extension of that route.
State Road 23 was defined in the 1945 renumbering as:

- From a point on SR 20 and SR 25 approximately 1 mile (1.6 km) northwest of Paradise in a northwesterly direction to the intersection with SR 235 in LaCrosse and along SR 235 for approximately 0.07 miles (0.11 km), then continuing northwesterly via Santa Fe to a junction with SR 18 at Worthington Springs and along SR 18 to a point approximately 1 mile (1.6 km) north of Worthington Springs, then northeasterly to a junction with SR 100 in Lake Butler and East on SR 100 to a point near the eastern city limits of Lake Butler then northeasterly via Raiford to a junction with SR 10 in Macclenny and along SR 10 to 5th Street then in a northerly direction along 5th Street to the St. Mary's River at the Georgia state line.

Prior to the renumbering, this had been:

- SR 99 from northwest of Paradise to Worthington Springs
- SR 113 from northwest of Paradise to LaCrosse
- SR 49 from Worthington Springs to Georgia

At some point, SR 23 was renumbered as part of SR 121, probably to match Georgia State Route 121. Before that, however, SR 23 had been extended around the west side of Gainesville to end at US 441/SR 25 at Rocky Point, and the southernmost part did not become part of SR 121. It was later given to the county, and has a possibility of becoming County Road 23.

The State Road 23 designation has since been reused for a partial beltway around Jacksonville.

In 1975, the City of Gainesville recommended a truck ban along SR 121 and established a truck route around downtown. In 1979. FDOT widened the road within the city, which included the creation of a retaining wall along the University of Florida Golf Course that has since become a target for graffiti artists. The truck ban was lifted in the early 1980s, but reestablished later in the decade after a series of fatal accidents.

== Major intersections ==
County	Location	mi	km	Destinations	Notes
Levy	Lebanon Station	0.000– 0.135	0.000– 0.217	US 19 / US 98 (SR 55) / CR 336 east – Inglis, St. Petersburg, Chiefland, Mobile	
Levy		5.086	8.185	CR 337 – Bronson	
Levy		8.354	13.444	CR 464 east	
Levy		11.573	18.625	CR 326 – Henry Beck Park	
Levy		16.808	27.050	CR 316 west (Northeast 20th Street)	
Levy		17.959	28.902	CR 335A north (Northeast 167th Court)	
Levy	Williston	20.224	32.547	US 41 south (SR 45) / CR 316 east (Northeast 30th Street) – Morriston, Dunnellon, Tampa	south end of US 41 / SR 45 overlap
Levy	Williston	21.034	33.851	US 27 Alt. north (SR 500) – Bronson	south end of US 27 Alt. / SR 500 overlap
Levy	Williston	21.559	34.696	US 27 south (Noble Avenue / SR 500) – Ocala	north end of US 27 Alt. / SR 500 overlap; south end of US 27 overlap
Levy	Williston	21.979	35.372	US 27 north / US 41 north (North Main Street / SR 45) – Archer	north end of US 27 / US 41 / SR 45 overlap
Levy	Williston	22.914	36.877	CR 318A (Mixson Road / Northeast 50th Street)	
Levy		23.885	38.439	CR 331A south (Northeast 205th Street)	
Levy		26.018	41.872	CR 335 (Northeast 75th Street)	
Levy		28.284	45.519	CR 320 east	
Alachua		30.205	48.610	CR 346 west	
Alachua		32.231	51.871	CR 346A west (Southwest 137th Avenue)	
Alachua	Gainesville	32.98	53.08	I-75 (SR 93) – Lake City, Tampa, truck route to SR 24 west / SR 26 west	I-75 exit 382
Alachua	Gainesville	38.157	61.408	SR 331 north (Williston Road) to US 441 / US 301 – Gainesville, truck route to SR 121 north / SR 24 east / SR 26 east	
Alachua	Gainesville	39.765	63.996	SR 24 (Archer Road) to I-75 – Archer, Waldo	
Alachua	Gainesville	41.369	66.577	SR 26A (Southwest 2nd Avenue)	
Alachua	Gainesville	41.489	66.770	SR 26 (West University Avenue)	
Alachua	Gainesville	44.017	70.838	SR 222 (Northwest 39th Avenue) to I-75 – Orange Heights	
Alachua	Gainesville	45.290	72.887	CR 232 (Northwest 53rd Avenue)	
Alachua	Gainesville	46.200	74.352	US 441 (SR 20 / SR 25) – Alachua, Gainesville, truck route to SR 121 south	
Alachua	Gainesville	49.303	79.345	CR 231 north	
Alachua	LaCrosse	55.922	89.998	SR 235 south – Alachua	south end of SR 235 overlap
Alachua	LaCrosse	56.176	90.407	SR 235 north – Brooker	north end of SR 235 overlap
Alachua	LaCrosse	56.513	90.949	CR 1493 north	
Alachua	Santa Fe	59.281	95.404	CR 236 west to I-75 – High Springs	
Alachua		61.620	99.168	CR 239 south	
Union	Worthington Springs	62.703	100.911	SR 18 east – Brooker	
Union	Worthington Springs	63.726	102.557	CR 18 west – Fort White	
Union	Dukes	65.622	105.608	CR 18A east / CR 239A west	
Union		66.908	107.678	CR 231A east / CR 796 west (Southwest 76th Street)	
Union	Lake Butler	70.913	114.123	SR 231 (Dr. M.L. King Jr. Avenue)	
Union	Lake Butler	72.307	116.367	SR 100 – Lake City, Starke	
Union	Johnstown	76.748	123.514	CR 237 south	
Union	Raiford	78.752	126.739	CR 229 (Central Avenue)	
Union	Raiford	79.618	128.133	SR 16 east to I-95 – State Prison, Starke, St. Augustine	
Union		83.245	133.970	CR 125 south	south end of CR 125 overlap
Baker		89.612	144.217	CR 125 north – Glen St. Mary	north end of CR 125 overlap
Baker		91.524	147.294	CR 130 west (Mud Lake Road)	
Baker	Macclenny	94.532	152.135	CR 23A west (Woodlawn Road)	
Baker	Macclenny	94.65	152.32	I-10 (SR 8) to I-95 – Lake City, Tallahassee, Jacksonville	I-10 exit 335
Baker	Macclenny	95.600	153.853	CR 23A (Lowder Street)	
Baker	Macclenny	96.259	154.914	US 90 (Macclenny Avenue / SR 10) – Glen St. Mary, Baldwin	
Baker	Macclenny	97.449	156.829	CR 23B west / CR 228 east – Baker County Fair Grounds	
Baker		99.829	160.659	CR 23C (Steel Bridge Road)	
Baker		101.380	163.155	CR 23D west	
Baker		101.867	163.939	SR 23 north / SR 121 north – St. George, Folkston	Continuation to Georgia; Southern terminus of SR 23; Georgia state line (St. Marys River bridge)
1.000 mi = 1.609 km; 1.000 km = 0.621 mi: Concurrency terminus

== Related routes ==
=== Gainesville State Road 121 Truck ===
State Road 121 Truck
- Location: Gainesville

Florida State Truck Route 121 in Gainesville, Florida was formed in the mid-1970s in order to divert trucks form the congested downtown areas of Gainesville. The route begins at the intersection of State Road 121, Florida State Road 331 and Alachua County Road 23, removing the concurrencies with the SR 24 and 26 Truck Routes. At the intersection with U.S. Route 441, the routes are joined by a truck route of that route as well. The four truck routes run northeast along SR 331 and then curve to the north. SR 331 terminates at the east end of the overlap of SRs 20, 24, and 26, which also serves as the terminus of Florida Truck Routes 24 and 26. However US 441 Truck and Florida Truck Route 121 continue to the northeast until the intersection with Florida State Road 222. At this point, the truck routes turn west overlapping SR 222 and intersection Florida State Road 20. US Truck Route 441 terminates at the intersection of SR 222 and US 441, while Florida Truck Route 121 makes a right turn and follows US 441 northbound until the intersection with its parent route.

=== County Road 121A ===
County Road 121A
- Location: LaCrosse

County Road 121A is the sole suffixed alternate of SR 121 that exists within the State of Florida. It is a former segment of SR 121 that exists entirely in LaCrosse. The route is unmarked, and runs along the east side of SR 121 south of downtown to halfway between the SR 121/235 overlap across from the LaCrosse Post Office.
