= List of county roads in Alachua County, Florida =

- County road shields used in Florida

Highway names
- Interstates: Interstate X (I-X)
- US Highways: U.S. Highway X (US X)
- State: State Road X (SR X)
- County: County Road X (CR X)

System links
- County roads in Florida; County roads in Alachua County

The following is a list of county roads in Alachua County, Florida. All county roads are maintained by the county in which they reside, however not all of them are marked with standard MUTCD approved county road shields.

== List ==
Route number	Road Name(s)	Direction and Termini					Notes
CR 20B	SE 214th Street, SE 65th Avenue, SE 221st Street	W/E	CR 2082 (SE 69th Avenue)	Hawthorne	CR 2082 (SE 69th Avenue)	Hawthorne	former SR 20B
CR 23	122nd Street	S/N	SR 24 (SW Archer Road)	Southwest of Gainesville	SR 26 (W Newberry Road)	West of Gainesville	former SR 23
CR 23A	Old Archer Road	W/E	SR 121 (SW 34th Street)	Gainesville	Old Archer Road	Gainesville	former SR 23A
CR 24A	NW 138th Avenue	W/E	NW 214th Terrace	High Springs	CR 235A	Alachua	
CR 25A	SE 165th Avenue, E. Tuscawilla Road, NE Cholokka Boulevard, NW Seminary Avenue	W/E; N/S	US 441	East of Micanopy	CR 234	Micanopy	former SR 25A unsigned
CR 25A	NW 126th Avenue, NW 120th Lane	S/N	US 441	Hague	US 441	Hague	former SR 25A
CR 25B	NW 174th Avenue, NW 222nd Street	W/E	US 27 / US 41 (S. Main Street)	High Springs	US 441	High Springs	
CR 26A	Newberry Lane	W/E	US 27 / US 41	Newberry	SR 26 (W. Newberry Road)	Newberry	former SR 26A
CR 27	91st Street	S/N	CR 30 (SW 24th Avenue) and SW 91st Street	West of Gainesville	SR 26 (W. Newberry Road)	West of Gainesville	
CR 29	75th Street	S/N	SR 24 (Archer Road)	Arredondo	SR 26 (Newberry Road)	West of Gainesville	GIS data shows this as CR 237, probably a typo
CR 30	SW 24th Avenue, SW 20th Avenue	W/E	SW 122nd Street	West of Gainesville	SR 121 (SW 34th Street)	Gainesville	
CR 32	SW 8th Avenue	W/E	SW 122nd Street	West of Gainesville	SW 67th Terrace	West of Gainesville	
CR 120	NW 31st Boulevard, NW 31st Avenue, NW 23rd Boulevard, NW 23rd Avenue	W/E	SR 121 (NW 34th Street) and NW 37th Avenue	Gainesville	US 441 (NW 13th Street) / SR 120 (NW 23rd Avenue)	Gainesville	former SR 232A extension of SR 120
CR 121A	NW 49th Terrace	S/N	SR 121	LaCrosse	SR 121 / SR 235	LaCrosse	former SR 121A
CR 172	NW 83rd Street, NW 23rd Avenue, NW 16th Boulevard, NW 16th Avenue	W/E	SR 222 (NW 39th Avenue)	West of Gainesville	SR 24 (Waldo Road)	Gainesville	
CR 200A	SE 203rd Street	S/N	CR 325	Island Grove	US 301	north of Island Grove	former SR 200A
CR 200A	SE 221st Street	S/N	US 301	Hawthorne	SR 20	Hawthorne	former SR 200A
CR 219A		S/N	US 301	North of Hawthorne	SR 26	West of Melrose	former SR 219A
CR 222	NW 39th Avenue	W/E	CR 241 (NW 143rd Street)	West of Gainesville	I-75 / SR 222 (NW 39th Avenue)	West of Gainesville	former SR 222
CR 225	NW 60th Avenue, SE County Road 225	S/N	CR 225	Marion–Alachua county line southeast of Evinston	CR 346	North of Evinston	former SR 225
CR 225	SE 43rd Street	S/N	SR 20	Southeast of Gainesville	SR 26 (E. University Avenue)	Gainesville	former SR 225
CR 225	NE 39th Street, NE County Road 225, E County Road 225	S/N	CR 232 (NE 53rd Avenue)	Fairbanks	US 301	North of Waldo	former SR 225
CR 225A	NE 77th Avenue, NE 56th Terrace	W/E	CR 225	West of Fairbanks	SR 24 (NE Waldo Road)	Fairbanks	former SR 225A
CR 231		S/N	SR 121	North of Gainesville	SR 231 / SR 235	East of LaCrosse	former SR 231
CR 232	NW 78th Avenue	W/E	CR 232 / CR 2085 (NW 298th Street)	Gilchrist–Alachua county line, northwest of High Springs	CR 241 (NW 143rd Street)	Alachua	former SR 232
CR 232	Millhopper Road, NW 53rd Avenue	W/E	CR 241 (NW 143rd Street)	Alachua	SR 24 (NE Waldo Road)	Northeast of Gainesville	former SR 232; inventoried by FDOT as CR 1470 east of CR 2053
CR 234		S/N	CR 329	Marion–Alachua county line, southwest of Micanopy	US 441	Northwest of Micanopy	former SR 234, SR 325, and SR 329; Brief unsigned concurrency with US 441 in Micanopy
CR 234		S/N	US 441 and NE Cholokka Boulevard	Micanopy	SR 26	Southwest of Orange Heights	former SR 234, SR 325, and SR 329; Brief unsigned concurrency with US 441 in Micanopy
CR 235		S/N	SR 26 (W. Newberry Road)	Newberry	CR 241 (NW 140th Street)	Alachua	former SR 235
CR 235A	NW 173rd Street (south of US 441)	S/N	CR 235	Alachua	CR 236	Traxler	former SR 235A
CR 236	N Main Street (High Springs)	W/E	US 41 / US 441	High Springs	SR 121	Santa Fe	former SR 236
CR 237		S/N	US 441	Alachua	SR 235 and NW 75th Street	Southwest of LaCrosse	former SR 237
CR 239		S/N	SR 235	Northeast of Alachua	SR 121	South of Worthington Springs	former SR 239
CR 241	SW 170th Street, SW 134th Street	S/N	CR 241	Levy–Alachua county line, south of Archer	US 27 / US 41	Archer	former SR 241
CR 241	SW 170th Street	S/N	US 27 / US 41	Archer	SR 26 and NW 170th Street	Jonesville	former SR 241
CR 241	NW 143rd Street, NW 140th Street	S/N	SR 26 (Newberry Road)	East of Jonesville	CR 235	Alachua	former SR 241
CR 241	SW 140th Street	S/N	SR 235	Alachua	CR 241	Alachua–Union county line, northeast of High Springs	former SR 241
CR 325		S/N	CR 200A (SE 219th Avenue)	Island Grove	SR 20 (SE Hawthorne Road)	Phifer	former SR 325
CR 329	Main Street	S/N	SR 20 / SR 26 (University Avenue)	Gainesville	CR 232 (NE 53rd Avenue)	Gainesville	former SR 329
CR 329A	SW 15th Street, SE 41th Avenue, SE 27th Street	W/E	SR 20 and SW 15th Street	Gainesville	SR 20	Gainesville	Signed as CR 2043
CR 329B	SE 55th Boulevard, Lakeshore Drive, SE 74th Street, E. University Avenue	S/N	SR 20 (SE Hawthorne Road)	Southeast of Gainesville	SR 26 (E. University Avenue)	East of Gainesville	former SR 329B
CR 337	SW 282nd Street, SW 266th Street	S/N	CR 337 (SW 282nd Street)	Levy–Alachua county line, south of Newberry	SR 26 (W. Newberry Road) and NW 266th Street	Newberry	former SR 337
CR 338	NW 8th Avenue	W/E	SR 26 (Newberry Road)	Gainesville	CR 329 (Main Street)	Gainesville	former SR 338
CR 340	NW 182nd Avenue, Poe Springs Road	W/E	CR 340 (NW 182nd Avenue) / CR 2085 (NW 298th Street)	Gilchrist–Alachua county line, west of High Springs	US 27 / US 41 (S. Main Street)	High Springs	former SR 236
CR 340	NW 156th Avenue	W/E	SR 121 and NW 156th Avenue	South of LaCrosse	CR 225 and NE 156th Avenue	Monteocha	former SR 340
CR 340A	NW 143rd Place, Rachel Boulevard	W/E	SR 235 / CR 235 (NW 140th Street) and NW 143rd Place	Alachua	US 441	Alachua	Signed as CR 2054
CR 346	East High Street	W/E	US 27 / US 41 and SW 135th Avenue	Archer	SR 121 (SW Williston Road)	Northeast of Raleigh	former SR 346
CR 346		W/E	US 441 and Hunter Avenue	Micanopy	CR 325	Northeast of Evinston	former SR 346
CR 346A	SW 91st Street, SW 137th Avenue	W/E	CR 346	Southeast of Archer	SR 121 (SW Williston Road)	East of Archer	former SR 346A
CR 1469	NE 114th Avenue	S/N	CR 219A	Northwest of Beckhampton	CR 1471	Shenks	former SR 200A
CR 1471		S/N	US 301	Shenks	CR 325	Alachua–Bradford county line, northeast of Waldo	former SR 325
CR 1474		W/E	CR 234	North of Windsor	Price Road	Alachua–Putnam county line, southeast of Beckhamton	former SR 234
CR 1475	Cole Street, NE 148th Avenue	S/N	SR 24 (NE Waldo Road/Kennard Street) and Cole Street	Waldo	CR 225	Alachua–Bradford county line, south of Graham	former SR 200A
CR 1491	NW 262nd Avenue	S/N	CR 236	Traxler	CR 241	North-northeast of Traxler	
CR 1493		S/N	SR 121	LaCrosse	CR 237	Alachua–Bradford county line, north-northeast of LaCrosse	former SR 237
CR 2034	NW 226th Street, NW 102nd Avenue, NW 234th Street	S/N	CR 232 (NW 78th Avenue)	South of Forest Grove	CR 2054 and NW 126th Lane	South of High Springs	
CR 2041	SE 152nd Street	S/N	CR 2082	South-southwest of Grove Park	SR 20 (SE Hawthorne Road) and SE 152md Street	West of Grove Park	former SR 20A
CR 2043	SW 15th Street, SE 41st Avenue, SE 27th Street	W/E	SR 20 and SW 15th Street	Gainesville	SR 20	Gainesville	former SR 329A inventoried by FDOT as CR 2045 and CR 2070; shown on FDOT county maps as CR 329A
CR 2045	SW 298th Street, SE 96th Avenue	S/N	SE 110th Street / SW 63rd Avenue	Gilchrist–Alachua county line, southwest of Newberry	SR 26 (W. Newberry Road) and SE 90th Avenue	Gilchrist–Alachua county line, west of Newberry	
CR 2053	NW 43rd Street	S/N	SR 26 (Newberry Road) and NW 44th Street	Gainesville	CR 232 (NW 53rd Avenue) and NW 43rd Street	Gainesville	former SR 232 and SR 329
CR 2054	Peggy Road	W/E	CR 2034 (NW 234th Street) and NW 126th Lane	South of High Springs	CR 235 / CR 241 (NW 140th Street)	Alachua	former SR 340A; segment east of NW 146th Terrace not indicated to be part of route on FDOT county map, but is signed as such.
CR 2054	NW 143rd Place	W/E	CR 235 / CR 241 (NW 140th Street)	Alachua	US 441	Alachua	Shown on FDOT county map as CR 340A, but signed as an eastern segment of CR 2054
CR 2082	SE 69th Avenue	W/E	SR 20 (SE Hawthorne Road)	Northwest of Rochelle	US 301 (Sid Martin Highway)	Hawthorne	former SR 20A
CR 2085	Northwest 298th Street	S/N	CR 232 / CR 232	Gilchrist–Alachua county line, southwest of High Springs	CR 340 / CR 340	Gilchrist–Alachua county line, west of High Springs	
