= Florida State Road 329 =

State highway in Florida, United States

State Road 329
- Former total length of SR 329 in grey

Route information
- Maintained by FDOT
- Length: 6.001 mi (9.658 km)
- Existed: ?–2013

Major junctions
- South end: SR 331 in Gainesville
- SR 20 / SR 24 / SR 26 in Gainesville
- North end: CR 232 in Gainesville

Location
- Country: United States
- State: Florida
- Counties: Alachua

Highway system
- Florida State Highway System; Interstate; US; State; Former; Pre‑1945; Toll; Scenic
← SR 327	→ US 331

State Road 329 (SR 329) was a short state highway traveling south and north through Gainesville, Florida. It comprised Main Street through Gainesville. The full length of the road extended from SR 331 to County Road 232 (CR 232). In the 1970s, the northern portion of the road, most of North Main Street, became County Road 329 (CR 329) while South Main Street was relinquished by the Florida Department of Transportation (FDOT) to the city. A small portion of the former state road in Gainesville is still maintained by the state as a portion of SR 20.

== Route description ==
SR 329 began at an intersection with SR 331, Williston Road, about 1/2 mile (0.80 km) from U.S. Route 441 (US 441). Originally, the intersection was a Y-intersection with the through movement being Williston Road to the south and Main Street to the north, however it was reconfigured around 2005 to make a T-intersection with SR 331 being the through movement. SR 329 traveled north as a four-lane divided highway through a mostly wooded area. As the road approaches SR 24A/SR 226 (SW 16th Avenue), more businesses begin to line the road. North of there, the road crosses the Gainesville-Hawthorne State Trail and Depot Street, the latter intersection being the northern end of state maintenance from 2012 to 2013. Past Depot Street, SR 329 / South Main Street narrows to two lanes with a center turn lane as the road enters downtown Gainesville. At University Avenue, the road intersects SR 20/SR 24/SR 26.

Now along North Main Street, SR 329 runs concurrent with SR 20 for about 1/2 mile (0.80 km). At NW 8th Avenue, SR 20 heads to the west while SR 329 continued north. The road at this point has four lanes with a center turn lane passing a strip mall and other businesses. The road made a slight curve to the northeast where it intersected SR 120. Curving back to the north, SR 329 intersected SR 222. The road narrowed to two lanes, again with a center turn lane, but with wooded lands flanking both sides of the road. The state road ended at CR 232 (NW 53rd Avenue) at an unsignalized T-intersection.

Since the transfer of the southern portion of SR 329 to the city and county, many changes were constructed along the road. A road diet was constructed between SR 24A/SR 226 and Depot Avenue with the removal of two travel lanes, addition of bike lanes, and the addition of center turn lanes and a small median. Roundabouts were constructed at SE 10th Avenue / Gainesville-Hawthorne State Trail and at Depot Avenue.

== History ==
The road had been created by 1952 when SR 329 ran from US 441/SR 25 (at its present intersection with SR 331) to the intersection of Main Street and University Avenue in downtown Gainesville. By 1955, the road had been truncated at its southern terminus as SR 331 had been created at that point. By September 1965, SR 329 was extended north to what was then SR 232, though a short portion north of NW 8th Avenue had been transferred to local maintenance. The road had generally remained unchanged until the late 1970s when the portion of the state road north of SR 20 had been turned into CR 329.

FDOT and Alachua County made an agreement for transfer of South Main Street in March 2005, but did not consummate the transfer until April 2012 (north of Depot Avenue) and June 2013 (south of Depot Avenue). Subsequently, in August 2013, the county transferred the portion north of Southwest 16th Avenue (SR 24A/SR 226) to the city of Gainesville.

== Major intersections ==
The entire route was in Gainesville, Alachua County.

mi	km	Destinations	Notes
0.000	0.000	SR 331 (SW Williston Road) to I-75	Southern terminus
1.3	2.1	SR 24A / SR 226 (SW 16th Avenue)	
1.888	3.038	Depot Avenue	Northern end of state maintenance (2012–2013)
2.404	3.869	SR 20 east / SR 24 / SR 26 (University Drive)	Northern end of state maintenance (1970s–2012); southern end of SR 20 concurrency
2.890	4.651	SR 20 west (8th Avenue)	Northern end of SR 20 overlap; southern terminus of CR 329
3.4	5.5	CR 172 (16th Avenue)	
4.0	6.4	SR 120 (23rd Avenue)	
5.0	8.0	SR 222 (NE 39th Avenue)	
6.001	9.658	CR 232 (NE 53rd Avenue)	Northern terminus
1.000 mi = 1.609 km; 1.000 km = 0.621 mi: Concurrency terminus
