= Florida State Road 331 =

State highway in Florida, U.S.

State Road 331

Route information
- Maintained by FDOT
- Length: 5.434 mi (8.745 km)

Major junctions
- South end: SR 121 in Gainesville
- US 441 near Gainesville
- North end: SR 20 / SR 24 / SR 26 in Gainesville

Location
- Country: United States
- State: Florida
- Counties: Alachua

Highway system
- Florida State Highway System; Interstate; US; State; Former; Pre‑1945; Toll; Scenic
← US 331	→ SR 345

State Road 331 (SR 331) is a short state highway running south and east of Gainesville, although it once stretched as far south as Williston. It also serves as a truck route for State Roads 24, 26, and 121 and US 441. Despite skirting the Gainesville City Limits, SR 331 runs north and south as a four-lane divided rural highway.

== Route description ==
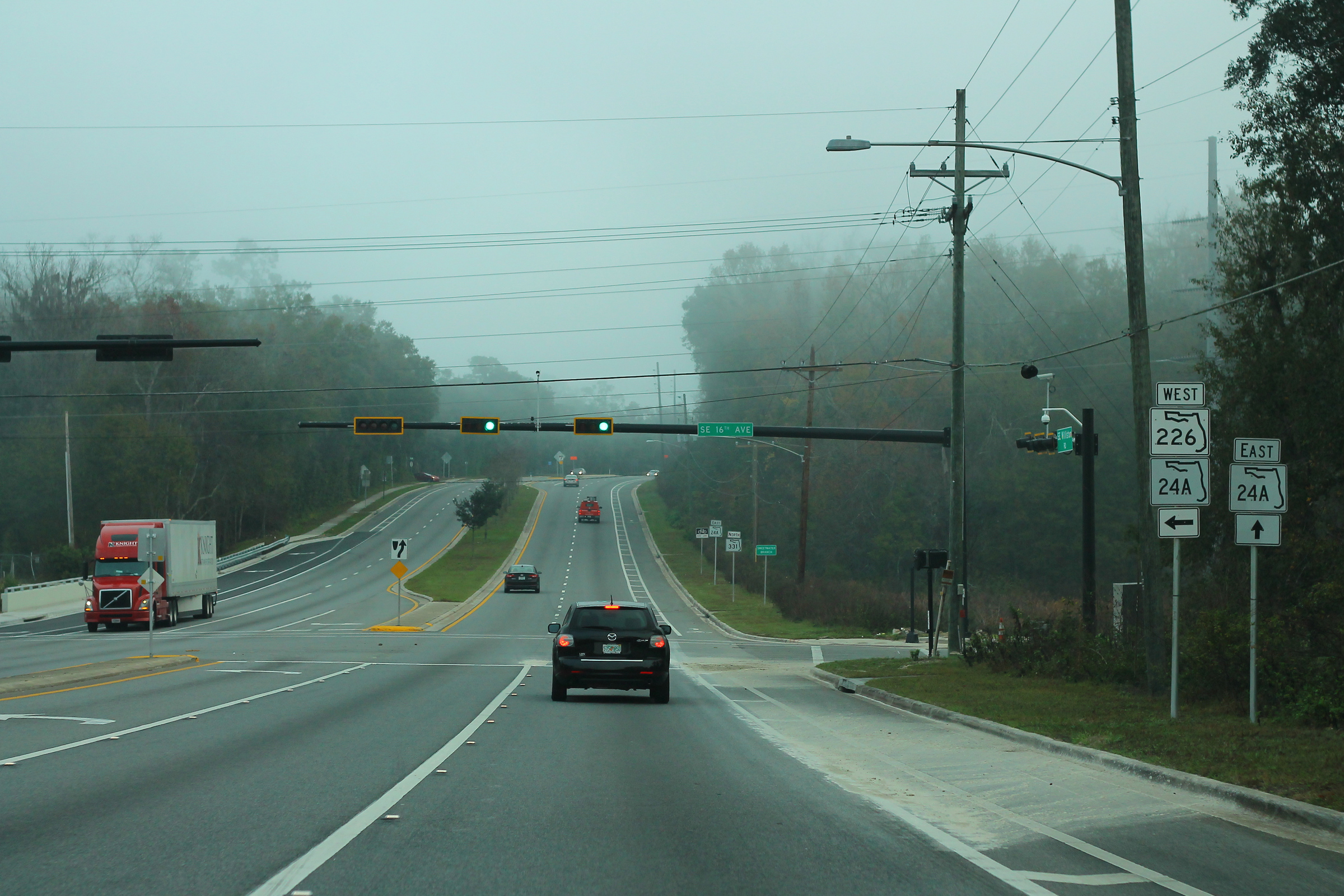
SR 331 at SR 24A near Gainesville

SR 331 begins at SR 121 east of Interstate 75 (I-75) at exit 382, when SR 121 makes a sharp left turn from Southwest Williston Road onto Southwest 34th Street. Like the segment that's part of SR 121, it runs southeast and northwest until it curves directly west and east before approaching U.S. Route 441 (US 441; Southwest 13th Street). After crossing US 441, Southwest Williston Road is joined by South Main Street, and SR 331 moved northeast onto South Main Street, which begins as an unmarked street on the southeast corner of US 441 & SR 331. After passing through some lowlands leading to Bivens Arm Lake, the former SR 329 takes the name of South Main Street away, and SR 331 runs exclusively along Southwest Williston Road. South of the Sugarhill and Woodland Park neighborhoods, SR 331 serves as the eastern terminus of SR 226, which also carries the designation of SR 24A. Beyond that intersection, SR 24A continues north along SR 331, both of which are now named Southeast Williston Road. The two routes cross the Gainesville-Hawthorne State Trail before finally turn directly north and south in the Lincoln Estates neighborhood. Southeast Williston Road ends at Southeast 11th Avenue and the street names are replaced with Southeast 11th Street or Waldo Road. SR 24A/331 end at SR 20/26, however Waldo Road continues to the northeast as part of SR 24. Northeast 11th Street continues straight north off to the side, as a local street.

== History ==
The original southern terminus of SR 331 was at US 27 and 41 in Williston, at what is today the north end of the overlap of US 27/41 and SR 121. At some point the route was truncated to its current location in Gainesville.

== Major intersections ==
The entire route is in Alachua County.

Location	mi	km	Destinations	Notes
Gainesville	0.000	0.000	SR 121 (Southwest 34th Street / Williston Road / CR 23 south) to I-75 – Williston, LaCrosse, truck route to SR 24 west / SR 26 west	
	2.055	3.307	US 441 (Southwest 13th Street / SR 25)	
Gainesville	2.606	4.194	South Main Street (unsigned CR 329)	South end of former SR 329
Gainesville	3.638	5.855	SR 226 west / SR 24A west (Southeast 16th Avenue)	South end of SR 24A overlap
Gainesville	5.434	8.745	SR 20 / SR 24 / SR 26 (East University Avenue / Waldo Road) to US 301 – Airport, Matheson Historical Center, Morningside Nature Center, truck route to SR 121 north / US 441 north	
1.000 mi = 1.609 km; 1.000 km = 0.621 mi: Concurrency terminus
