= Florida State Road 20 =

Highway in Florida, US

State Road 20
- SR 20 highlighted in red

Route information
- Maintained by FDOT
- Length: 358.154 mi (576.393 km)

Major junctions
- West end: SR 85 in Niceville
- US 27 / US 90 / SR 61 in Tallahassee; US 19 / US 27 / US 98 in Perry; US 441 / SR 24 / SR 26 in Gainesville; US 301 in Hawthorne; US 17 / SR 100 in Palatka
- East end: US 1 / SR 100 in Bunnell

Location
- Country: United States
- State: Florida
- Counties: Okaloosa, Walton, Washington, Bay, Calhoun, Liberty, Leon, Jefferson, Madison, Taylor, Lafayette, Suwannee, Columbia, Alachua, Putnam, Flagler

Highway system
- Florida State Highway System; Interstate; US; State; Former; Pre‑1945; Toll; Scenic
← SR A19A	→ SR 21

State Road 20 (SR 20) is a 358.154-mile-long (576.393 km) east-to-west route across northern Florida and the Florida Panhandle in the United States.

== Route description ==
=== Okaloosa County (Niceville and Bluewater Bay) ===
SR 20 starts at SR 85 in Niceville as John Sims Parkway, which travels to Eglin AFB East Gate through Valparaiso as westbound SR 85 and southbound SR 397. SR 20 heads slightly southeast while SR 85 goes north towards Crestview. The road shortly after intersects the southern terminus of SR 285 as it passes by Niceville High School, reducing to four lanes from six lanes. SR 20 continues straight through Niceville before turning more southeast, crossing the C.G. Meigs Bridge over Rocky Bayou, exiting the Niceville city limits and entering Bluewater Bay. 3 miles later, the road intersects SR 293, providing access to Destin via the Mid-Bay Bridge before reducing to two lanes and entering Walton County.

=== Walton County ===
Briefly after crossing the county line, SR 20 continues southeast before turning east into Choctaw Beach, skirting along the Choctawhatchee Bay, as a two lane road. Upon leaving Choctaw Beach, the speed limit increases from 45 mph (72 km/h) to 55–60 mph (89–97 km/h) into Portland, intersecting Eglin Site C-6 before intersecting County Road 83A, a loop road, twice in Freeport. Shortly after the second intersection with CR 83A, the road intersects US 331 Business, which happens to be US 331's old alignment through Freeport. SR 20 shortly after intersects US 331, exiting the town shortly after. Throughout the rest of Walton County, SR 20 does not intersect many roads other than SR 81 in Bruce, continuing eastbound.

=== Washington County and Bay County ===
SR 20 is very short through Washington County, only intersecting SR 79 in Ebro leading to Panama City Beach/Bonifay. The road runs for 5 miles before straddling the Washington/Bay county line for another 6 miles before veering southeast into Bay County.

Only about a mile after completely going into Bay County, SR 20 intersects SR 77, passing by several lakes for a few miles before turning northeast. The road intersects Blue Springs Road, then turning directly east and running close to the Washington County line, but still entirely in Bay County. After the county line ends, the road heads straight east, intersecting US 231 between Fountain and Youngstown, and then enters Calhoun County.

=== Calhoun County ===
State Road 20 continues heading straight east before veering southeast, then curving northeast, to finally resume the straight eastward pattern. The road becomes the southern terminus of SR 287 before entering a very short concurrency with SR 73 in Clarksville. Outside of it, the route intersects CR 275 between Clarksville and Blountstown. Through Blountstown, SR 20 is known as Central Avenue, still being a two lane road. The road slightly expands to include turn medians, intersecting SR 71, which allows access to SR 69. Shortly after, the road passes by the county sheriff's office and the courthouse. After Blountstown, the road becomes four lane, crossing the Apalachicola River on the Trammell Bridge into Liberty County.

=== Liberty County ===
After crossing the Apalachicola River, the road immediately heads into Bristol, remaining a four lane road through the town, intersecting SR 12 in the process. SR 20 then goes slightly southeast, intersecting Dempsey Barron Rd toward Hosford. The route intersects SR 65 in Hosford, after which the road intersects barely any more important roads in the county until it reaches, and running concurrent to, SR 267 right before crossing the Ochlockonee River into Leon County.

=== Leon County (including Tallahassee) ===
SR 20/SR 267 intersect CR 375 shortly after crossing county lines right before SR 267 splits from SR 20 as Bloxham Cutoff, going to US 98 heading to Perry, bypassing Tallahassee. SR 20, meanwhile, goes northeast, intersecting many rural roads through Fort Braden. The route goes straight east once more through Apalachicola National Forest before intersecting some more small, local roads while encountering a few stop light intersections. Finally, SR 20 enters Tallahassee and meets SR 263/Capital Circle SW and directly after meets SR 366, which heads east as Pensacola Street leading to Stadium Drive, while SR 20 heads north as Blountstown Street. About 1.3 miles later, SR 20 meets US 90/Tennessee Street and turns right into a hidden concurrency. The two roads head southeast along Tennessee St before drifting northeast and then east. After intersecting Stadium Drive, the roads head southeast again, passing along the north side of Florida State University. Heading directly east into downtown, the routes meet US 27/SR 61/Monroe Street, where SR 20 turns right onto these routes into another hidden concurrency, while US 90 continues as Tennessee Street heading east. Routes 20/27/61 run south along Monroe Street until heading east with US 27 along Apalachee Parkway in front of the Florida Capitol building, while SR 61 continues south along Monroe Street. Routes 20/27 head east along Apalachee Parkway out of Tallahassee, intersecting US 319/Capital Circle SE along the way. The two routes remain four laned throughout the rest of Leon County.

=== Jefferson County and Madison County ===
Remaining four laned all the way to Perry, US 27/SR 20 head east, intersecting SR 59. Around halfway between Capps and SR 59 is CR 259 in Waukeenah. In Capps, US 19, heading south from Monticello, join the 20/27 concurrency before the roads go right slightly before going even more southeast heading briefly into Madison County. In Madison County, the roads intersect CR 150 before entering Taylor County.

=== Taylor County ===
US 19/SR 20/US 27 head into Taylor County as Byron Butler Parkway, retaining four lanes and southeasterly direction. The routes go almost go perfectly straight for 16.5 miles until they reach Perry, where the routes go briefly south, where an intersection with US 98/Hampton Springs Avenue has US 19 leaving the concurrency with US 27/SR 20 to go along US 98 southbound heading towards St Petersburg, with SR 20/US 27 going east along Hampton Springs. A few blocks later, the routes intersect US 221/Jefferson St before leaving Perry and soon afterwards Taylor County, continuing east.

=== Lafayette County ===
As a two lane road, US 27/SR 20 head east, intersecting CR 348 and soon after CR 534. Afterwards, the roads head southeast again toward Mayo, where the roads go east, as well as intersecting SR 51, then after Mayo, head southeast once more. Curving slightly northeast, the routes intersect SR 349 and quickly enter Branford in Suwannee County.

=== Suwannee County/Columbia County ===
Immediately after crossing the county line, the roads enter the town of Branford, intersecting US 129/SR 249. After Branford, the roads head east to intersect SR 49. Routes 20/27 soon head southeast upon entering Columbia County, intersecting SR 47 in Fort White before CR 18 terminates at the routes, which briefly go south to then resuming their southeasterly direction towards High Springs.

=== Alachua County ===
Upon entering Alachua County, routes SR 20/US 27 enter High Springs. In the city, the two routes meet with US 41 (hidden SR 45) where US 27 finally parts ways with SR 20 by turning south onto US 41, ending their 120 mile long concurrency. SR 20 is independent (and is a signed route) for a few blocks in High Springs before becoming concurrent with US 441, where it goes into yet another hidden concurrency, shared with hidden SR 25. The routes head slightly southeast as a four-lane road, intersecting I-75 at exit 399 and entering Alachua, intersecting SR 235. The roads curve to the south as they enter Gainesville, and the concurrency ends in the north part of town as US 441 becomes 13th Street while SR 20 parallels it as 6th Street. SR 20 turns east on 8th Avenue and south on Main Street before turning east again on University Avenue, concurrent with SR 24/SR 26. In the east part of town, SR 20 splits from SR 24, then SR 26 and turns southeast as Hawthorne Road to Hawthorne, where it intersects US 301, to enter Putnam County.

=== Putnam County ===
As SR 20 goes slightly northeast, it intersects SR 21. Going east, the route goes to Interlachen where it intersects CR 315, where the road increases to four lanes to Palatka. The road is kept four lanes through Palatka, where it is known as Crill Avenue, and intersecting SR 19, then heads east to Palm Avenue where it is reduced to two lanes. SR 20 continues to head east along Crill Avenue, then turns north on 9th avenue to US 17 (under one last hidden concurrency), where they cross the St Johns River on the Palatka Memorial Bridge and curve south in East Palatka toward San Mateo, where SR 20 and SR 100 end their concurrency with US 17 to head southeast out of Putnam County.

=== Flagler County ===
SR 20/100 continue their southeasterly direction for a bit to head straight east to intersect CR 305 and CR 205, then they go east to go into Bunnell, where SR 20 ends at US 1 just after going over an overpass. SR 100, however, goes concurrent with US 1 to Bunnell and continues to SR A1A.

== Route naming ==
The portion of SR 20 running through all of Calhoun County was designated as "Fuller Warren Parkway" by the Florida State Legislature in 1999.

The portion of SR 20 that runs in a hidden concurrency with US 27 in Leon County was designated as "Apalachee Parkway" by the Florida State Legislature in 1961.

The portion of SR 20 that runs in a hidden concurrency with US 27 in Leon, Jefferson, Madison, and Taylor counties was designated as "Blue Star Memorial Highway" by the Florida State Legislature in 1957. The same portion of SR 20 in Taylor, Jefferson, and Leon counties was also designated as "Paradise Drive" by the Florida State Legislature in 1951.

The portion of hidden SR 20 from Perry to High Springs was designated as "Fred P Parker Memorial Highway" by the Florida State Legislature in 1941.

The portion of SR 20 in Alachua County that runs in a hidden concurrency with US 441 was designated as "Martin Luther King Jr. Highway" by the Florida State Legislature in 1988.

The portion of SR 20 in Alachua County that runs in a hidden concurrency with US 27 was designated as "United Spanish War Veterans Memorial Highway" by the Florida State Legislature in 1947.

The entire portion of SR 20 that runs in a hidden concurrency with US 27 was designated as "Claude Pepper Memorial Highway" by the Florida State Legislature in 1999. Further, the same co-signed portion of SR 20 was designated as "Purple Heart Highway" by the Florida State Highway Board in 2010.

== Major intersections ==
County	Location	mi	km	Destinations	Notes
Okaloosa	Niceville	0.000	0.000	SR 85 to I-10 – Shalimar, Crestview, Northwest Florida Regional Airport	Western terminus of SR 20; continues as John Sims Parkway
Okaloosa	Niceville	0.779	1.254	SR 285 north (Partin Drive) to I-10 east – Mossy Head	
Okaloosa		6.72	10.81	SR 293 (Spence Parkway) to US 98 / I-10 – Destin, Okaloosa Island, Crestview, Mid-Bay Bridge	Interchange
Walton		21.969	35.356	CR 83A east	
Walton	Freeport	23.919	38.494	CR 83A west	
Walton	Freeport	24.077	38.748	CR 883 north (Madison Street) – DeFuniak Springs	Former US 331 north / SR 83 north
Walton	Freeport	25.087	40.374	US 331 (SR 83) to I-10 – DeFuniak Springs, Santa Rosa Beach, Topsail Hill State Preserve	
Walton	Bruce	34.736	55.902	SR 81 north to I-10 – Redbay, Ponce de Leon	
Walton	Bruce	34.974	56.285	CR 3280 west	
Choctawhatchee River		39.03	62.81	Olan Rex Ferguson Bridge	
Washington	Ebro	40.404	65.024	SR 79 – Vernon, West Bay, Panama City Beach, Airport, Dog Track	
Bay		51.860	83.461	SR 77 – Airport	
Bay		67.576	108.753	US 231 (SR 75) – Fountain, Panama City, Panama City Beach	
Calhoun	Rollins Corner	80.361	129.328	CR 287 north	
Calhoun	Clarksville	82.352	132.533	SR 73 south	Western terminus of concurrency with SR 73
Calhoun	Clarksville	82.548	132.848	SR 73 north – Marianna	Eastern terminus of concurrency with SR 73
Calhoun		84.894	136.624	CR 275	
Calhoun	Blountstown	91.405	147.102	SR 71 – Altha, Wewahitchka	
Apalachicola River		93.83	151.00	Trammell Bridge	
Liberty	Bristol	95.595	153.845	CR 12 south (Central Street)	
Liberty	Bristol	95.951	154.418	SR 12 north to I-10 – Greensboro, Torreya State Park	
Liberty	Bristol	96.085	154.634	Northwest Pea Ridge Road	former CR 379 south
Liberty		97.583	157.045	CR 379 south (Northwest Hoecake Road)	
Liberty		103.959	167.306	CR 1641 north (Northwest Dempsey Barron Road) – Torreya State Park, Gregory House, Liberty Correctional Institution	
Liberty	Hosford	107.134	172.415	SR 65 – Telogia	
Liberty		112.768	181.483	CR 2224 west (Northeast Old Blue Creek Road)	
Liberty		113.981	183.435	SR 267 north to I-10 – Wallwood Scout Reservation, Quincy	Western terminus of concurrency with SR 267
Liberty		115.635	186.096	CR 0120 east	
Ochlockonee River		115.94	186.59	Bridge	
Leon		117.122	188.490	CR 375 south (Smith Creek Road) – Ochlockonee River State Park	
Leon	Bloxham	117.525	189.138	SR 267 south – Wakulla, Edward Ball Wakulla Springs State Park	Eastern terminus of concurrency with SR 267
Leon		131.522	211.664	Silver Lake Road - Silver Lake	former SR 260
Leon		132.010	212.450	CR 1585 north (Geddie Road)	
Leon		133.102	214.207	CR 1583 north (Barineau Road)	
Leon		133.920	215.523	CR 1581 north (Aenon Church Road)	
Leon	Tallahassee	135.183	217.556	SR 263 (Capital Circle) – Tallahassee Regional Airport, Tallahassee Museum of History and Natural Science	
Leon		135.416	217.931	SR 366 east (Pensacola Street)	
Leon	Tallahassee	136.782	220.129	US 90 west (Tennessee Street / SR 10) – Quincy, Pensacola	Western terminus of concurrency with US 90 and SR 10
Leon	Tallahassee	139.873	225.104	North Woodward Avenue	former SR 157
Leon	Tallahassee	140.937	226.816	US 90 east (Tennessee Street / SR 10) / US 27 north / SR 61 north (North Monroe Street) – Monticello	east end of US 90 / SR 10 overlap; west end of US 27 / SR 61 overlap
see US 27 (mile 474.740-353.085)
Alachua	High Springs	262.592	422.601	US 27 south / US 41 (North Main Street / SR 45) – Newberry, Lake City	Southern terminus of concurrency with US 27
Alachua	High Springs	263.161	423.517	US 441 north (SR 25) – Lake City	Northern terminus of concurrency with US 441 and SR 25; no left turn eastbound
Alachua	see US 441 (mile 377.744-359.884)				
Alachua	Gainesville	281.021	452.259	US 441 south (SR 25) – Micanopy, Ocala	Southern terminus of concurrency with US 441 and SR 25; no left turn westbound
Alachua	Gainesville	281.935	453.730	SR 222 (Northwest 39th Avenue) to I-75 – Airport	
Alachua	Gainesville	282.949	455.362	SR 120 (Northwest 23rd Avenue)	
Alachua	Gainesville	284.303	457.541	CR 329 north (North Main Street)	west end of SR 329 overlap
Alachua	Gainesville	284.789	458.323	SR 24 west / SR 26 west (University Avenue)	west end of SR 24 / SR 26 overlap; former east end of SR 329 overlap
Alachua	Gainesville	285.594	459.619	SR 24 east (Waldo Road) / SR 24A west / SR 331 south (Southeast 11th Street) – Airport, truck route to US 441 north / SR 24 west / SR 26 west / SR 121 north	Eastern terminus of concurrency with SR 24
Alachua	Gainesville	285.838	460.012	SR 26 east (East University Avenue)	Eastern terminus of concurrency with SR 26
Alachua	Gainesville	285.936	460.169	CR 2043 south (Southeast 15th Street)	
Alachua	Gainesville	287.091	462.028	CR 2043 south (Southeast 27th Street)	
Alachua		288.224	463.852	CR 225 north (Southeast 43rd Street)	
Alachua		289.235	465.479	CR 329B north (Lakeshore Drive / Southeast 55th Boulevard)	
Alachua		290.983	468.292	CR 2082 east – Rochelle	
Alachua		292.728	471.100	CR 234 – Windsor, Rochelle	
Alachua		294.251	473.551	CR 325 south – Cross Creek, Marjorie Kinnan Rawlings State Historic Site	
Alachua	Grove Park	296.105	476.535	CR 2041 south (Southeast 152nd Street)	
Alachua	Hawthorne	300.46	483.54	US 301 (SR 200) – Waldo, Ocala, Business District	interchange
Putnam	McMeekin	304.442	489.952	SR 21 north / CR 20A east – Melrose	
Putnam	Johnson Crossroads	307.361	494.650	CR 21 south – James H. Townsend House	
Putnam	Interlachen	313.189	504.029	CR 315 – Grandin	
Putnam	Francis	324.104	521.595	CR 309C north	
Putnam	Palatka	326.112	524.826	SR 19 – Salt Springs, truck route east	
Putnam	Palatka	327.456	526.989	CR 311 south (Husson Avenue)	
Putnam	Palatka	328.724	529.030	US 17 north / SR 100 west (Reid Street / SR 15 north) – Green Cove Springs, truck route to SR 20 west	Western terminus of concurrency with US 17, SR 15, and SR 100
see SR 100 (mile 115.130-144.560)
Flagler	Bunnell	358.154	576.393	US 1 / SR 100 east (North State Street / SR 5) – Flagler Beach, Daytona Beach, St. Augustine	Eastern terminus of SR 20, eastern terminus of concurrency with SR 100
1.000 mi = 1.609 km; 1.000 km = 0.621 mi: Concurrency terminus

== Related routes ==
=== County Road 0120 ===
County Road 0120
- Location: Liberty / Leon County Line

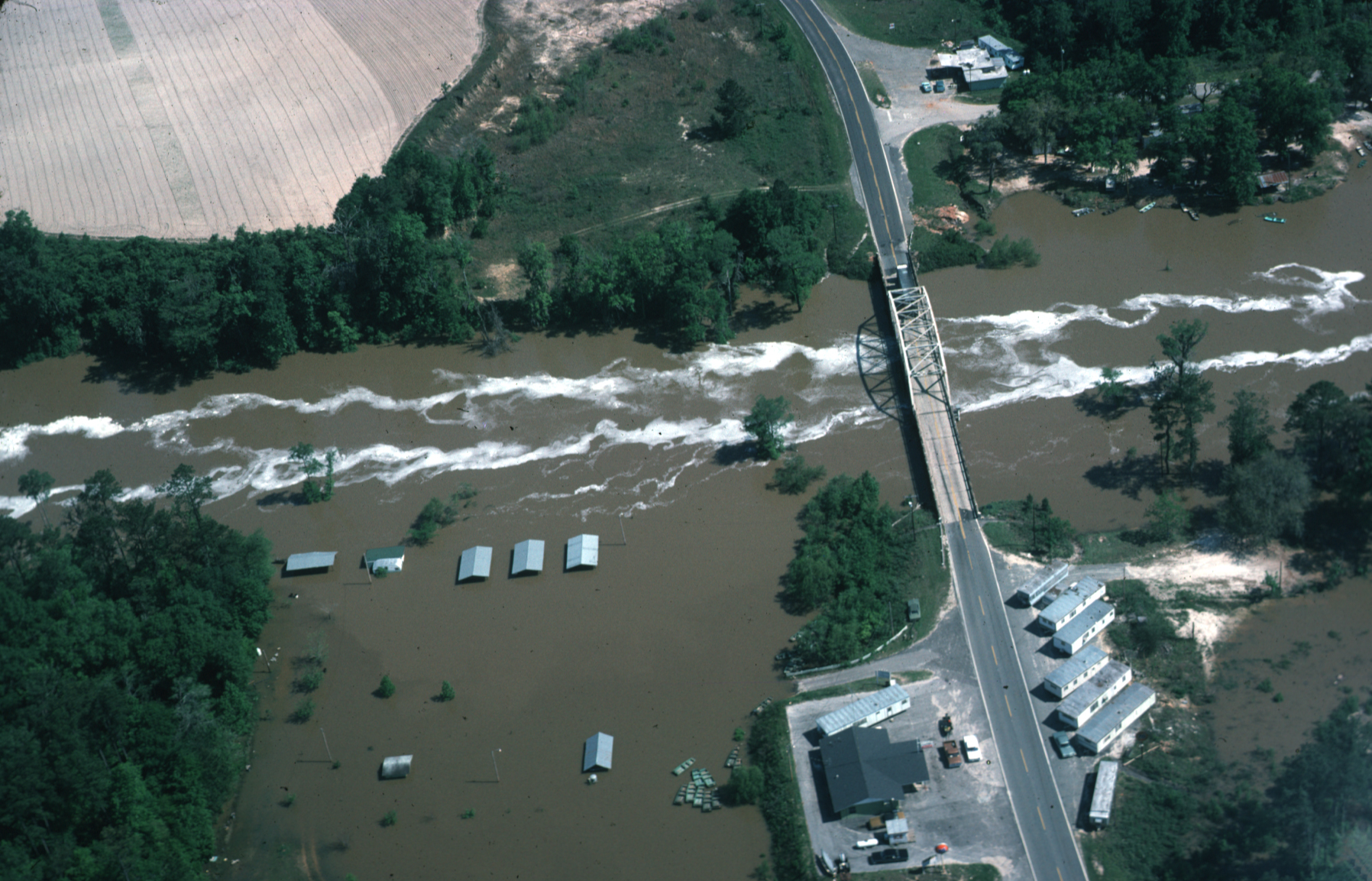
Aerial view of the Ochlockonee River in flood on April 16, 1975 near Bloxham, at the old Florida State Highway 20 bridge crossing and just southwest of the Talquin Dam.

County Road 0120 (CR 0120) is a short piece of an old alignment of State Road 20, at the Liberty/Leon County Line. CR 0120 only extends a couple of tenths of a mile (about 300 m) to the Ochlockonee River, where the old bridge has been dismantled; thus, it no longer connects, to Leon County CR 20, on the other side of the river.

The reasons for a realignment were to straighten out the curve on the Leon County side and to bypass a residential area. Along CR 0120, are entrances to a couple of residences and an abandoned gas station.

=== County Road 20A ===
County Road 20A
- Location: McMeekin – Interlachen

County Road 20A is a suffixed county alternate route on the south side of SR 20 in western Putnam County. It begins at the southern terminus of State Road 21 in McMeekin, and runs southeast towards Johnson, and Edgar, finally reaching Interlachen, where it turns north to meet SR 20 again.

=== Palatka truck route ===
State Road 20 Truck
- Location: Palatka

Florida State Truck Route 20 in Palatka, Florida was designated in order to divert trucks from the narrow and low bridge for the CSX Sanford Subdivision over SR 20. The truck route begins at the intersection with State Road 19, and follows that route north in an overlap that terminates at State Road 100. From there the truck route overlaps SR 100 individually until it reaches the western terminus of the overlap with U.S. Route 17. US 17-SR 100-Truck Route 20 all run over the abandoned grade crossing for the right-of-way of the former Atlantic Coast Line Railroad Rochelle Branch, then curves back to the east. The routes encounter the railroad line that mainline SR 20 crosses under, at a grade crossing with the Palatka Amtrak station to the north and the Palatka Police Station to the south. Truck Route 20 finally ends at 9th Street as it rejoins its parent route.
