= Florida State Road 26 =

Highway in Florida, US

State Road 26
- SR 26 highlighted in red

Route information
- Maintained by FDOT
- Length: 62.172 mi (100.056 km)
- Existed: 1945–present

Major junctions
- West end: US 19 / US 27 Alt. / US 98 in Fanning Springs
- US 129 in Trenton; US 27 / US 41 in Newberry; I-75 in Gainesville; US 441 / SR 20 / SR 24 in Gainesville; US 301 at Orange Heights; SR 21 in Melrose
- East end: SR 100 in Putnam Hall

Location
- Country: United States
- State: Florida
- Counties: Gilchrist, Alachua, Putnam

Highway system
- Florida State Highway System; Interstate; US; State; Former; Pre‑1945; Toll; Scenic
← SR 25A	→ US 27

State Road 26 (SR 26) is a 62.172-mile-long (100.056 km) east–west route across North Central Florida.

== Route description ==
The western terminus of SR 26 is at US 19/98/27 Alternate (unsigned SR 55) in Fanning Springs, near the Gilchrist/Levy county line. However the beginning of its run is a short curve towards the north with a connecting County Road 55A leading to southbound US 19/98/Alt-27, and only begins to move it its signed cardinal direction in Wilcox east of the junction between three segments of the Nature Coast State Trail. Beginning in Wilcox, the route runs parallel to the trail, and continues to do so through Lottieville, where it carries County Road 341 in a short overlap. The route proceeds east through Trenton where it is named West Wade Street in the vicinity of the Trenton Elementary School, which is also where the trail beings to move away from the road. West Wade Street becomes East Wade Street at the intersection with US 129, then the route passes into Alachua County and Newberry as West Newberry Road, where it briefly runs through the city's historic district. After running through the historic district, it intersects with US 27-41 (unsigned SR 45), and continues to maintain the same street name even as it passes through the communities of Jonesville and Tioga before encountering the interchange with Interstate 75 just west of Gainesville.

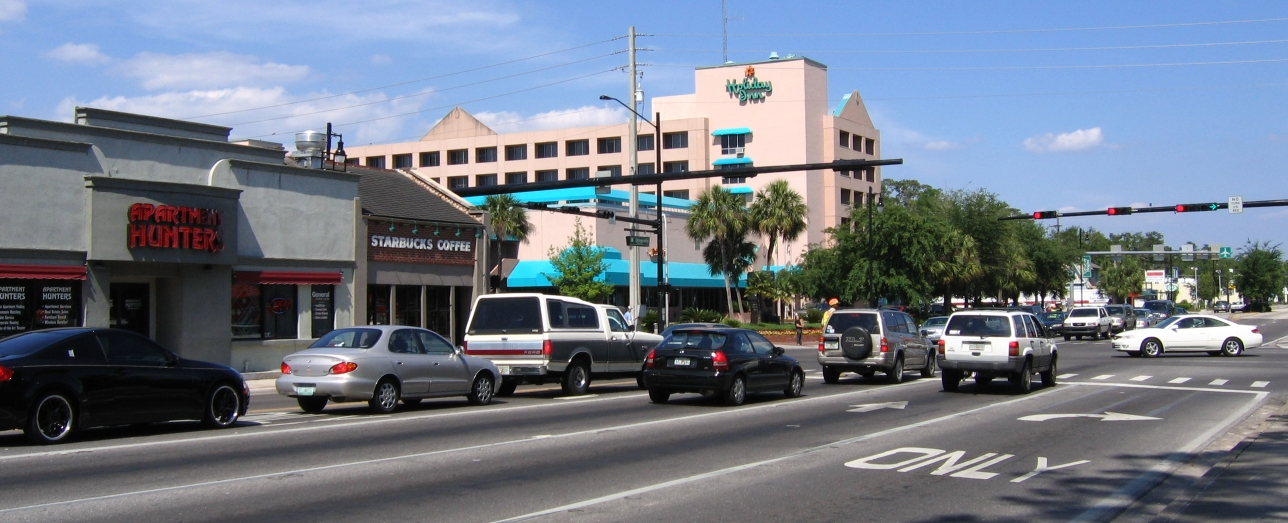
SR 26 (University Avenue) as seen from the University of Florida campus, approaching US 441 (13th Street)/SR 24.

East of the interstate, it runs straight east until the intersection with Northwest 57th Street where it curves to the southeast. SR 26 maintains the same street name until the road approaches State Road 26A, where West Newberry follows the same trajectory onto Southwest Second Avenue, while SR 26 moves onto University Avenue. East of President's Park, the route runs it runs along the northern edge of the University of Florida campus alongside Ben Hill Griffin Stadium, followed by a merge with SR 24 at U.S. Route 441 (13th Street) and SR 20 at former SR 329 (Main Street), separating again near the eastern city limits. Skirting the western shores of Newnan's Lake as well as the state forest named for the lake, it approaches the northern shores of the lake entering the Newnans Lake Conservation Area, where it makes a sharp right turn at the eastern terminus of SR 222. Leaving the preserve area and passing through farmland, the road later crosses US 301 in Orange Heights, although a realignment of SR 26 south of the existing intersection was built by the Florida Department of Transportation between 2010 and 2011 which includes an interchange. The next town along the route is Melrose, where the road enters the community's historic district, crosses the Alachua-Putnam County line and intersects SR 21, before it curves to the northeast and ends at SR 100 in Putnam Hall.

== Major intersections ==
County	Location	mi	km	Destinations	Notes
Gilchrist	Fanning Springs	0.000	0.000	US 19 north / US 27 Alt. north / US 98 north (SR 55) – Cross City	
Gilchrist	Fanning Springs	0.303	0.488	To (CR 55A south) south / US 19 south / US 27 Alt. south / US 98 – Chiefland, St. Petersburg	
Gilchrist	Wilcox	1.394	2.243	CR 232 north – Otter Springs, Hart Springs	
Gilchrist		2.453	3.948	CR 341 north – Hart Springs	western terminus of CR 341 overlap
Gilchrist	Lottieville	2.963	4.768	CR 334A north	
Gilchrist		3.960	6.373	CR 313 north	
Gilchrist		4.472	7.197	CR 341 south – Airport	eastern terminus of CR 341 overlap
Gilchrist		5.470	8.803	CR 307 north	
Gilchrist	Trenton	7.789	12.535	US 129 (Main Street / SR 49) – Bell, Chiefland, Live Oak	
Gilchrist	Trenton	8.499	13.678	CR 319 south (Southeast 11th Street)	
Gilchrist		13.377	21.528	CR 337 south	
Gilchrist		16.698	26.873	CR 337 north	
Alachua	Newberry	19.807	31.876	CR 337 south (Southwest 266th Street)	
Alachua	Newberry	20.802	33.478	US 27 / US 41 (Main Street / SR 45) – High Springs, Archer	
Alachua	Newberry	21.453	34.525	CR 235 north	
Alachua	Newberry	21.738	34.984	CR 26A west (Newberry Lane)	
Alachua	Jonesville	25.993	41.832	CR 241 south (Southwest 170th Street) – Airport	
Alachua	Tioga	27.644	44.489	CR 241 north (Northwest 143rd Street)	
Alachua	Gainesville	32.38	52.11	I-75 (SR 93) – Lake City, Tampa, truck route to SR 24 east / SR 26 east	I-75 exit 387
Alachua	Gainesville	33.519	53.944	Northwest 8th Avenue (CR 338 east)	
Alachua	Gainesville	34.144	54.949	Northwest 43rd Street (CR 2053 north)	
Alachua	Gainesville	34.842	56.073	SR 26A east (Southwest 2nd Avenue)	no left turn westbound
Alachua	Gainesville	35.277	56.773	SR 121 (West 34th Street)	
Alachua	Gainesville	36.496	58.735	SR 26A west (Southwest 2nd Avenue)	
Alachua	Gainesville	37.272	59.983	US 441 / SR 24 west (West 13th Street / SR 25)	west end of SR 24 overlap
Alachua	Gainesville	38.134	61.371	SR 20 west (Main Street)	west end of SR 20 overlap; Former SR 329 south to SR 331
Alachua	Gainesville	38.939	62.666	SR 24 east (Waldo Road) / SR 24A west / SR 331 south (Southeast 11th Street) – Airport, truck route to US 441 north / SR 24 west / SR 26 west / SR 121 north	east end of SR 24 overlap
Alachua	Gainesville	39.183	63.059	SR 20 east (Hawthorne Road)	east end of SR 20 overlap
Alachua		41.271	66.419	CR 225 south (Southeast 43rd Street)	
Alachua		41.945	67.504	CR 329B south (East University Avenue)	
Alachua	Gainesville	45.312	72.923	SR 222 west (Northeast 39th Boulevard) – Gainesville	
Alachua		48.194	77.561	CR 234 west – Windsor	
Alachua		50.128	80.673	CR 234 east (Northeast 70th Place)	
Alachua		50.97	82.03	To US 301 (Northeast State Road 26 / SR 262) – Orange Heights	interchange; former SR 26
Alachua		52.901	85.136	CR 1469 – Earleton	
Alachua		55.442	89.225	CR 219A south	
Putnam	Melrose	56.838	91.472	SR 21 – Keystone Heights	
Putnam		57.439	92.439	CR 219 north	
Putnam	Putnam Hall	62.172	100.056	SR 100 – Keystone Heights, Palatka	
1.000 mi = 1.609 km; 1.000 km = 0.621 mi: Concurrency terminus; Incomplete access

== Related routes ==
=== County Road 26A ===
County Road 26A
- Location: Newberry

County Road 26A (CR 26A), also known as Newberry Lane, is a former segment of SR 26 that spans from US 27/41 on the southeast corner of a railroad grade crossing to SR 26.

Major intersections

The entire route is in Newberry, Alachua County.

mi	km	Destinations	Notes
0.0	0.0	US 27 / US 41 (SR 45)	Western terminus
0.5	0.80	CR 235 (Northwest 242nd Street)	
0.8	1.3	SR 26 (West Newberry Road)	Eastern terminus
1.000 mi = 1.609 km; 1.000 km = 0.621 mi

=== State Road 26A ===
State Road 26A
- Location: Gainesville

State Road 26A (SR 26A) is a former section of State Road 26 in Gainesville, Florida. It is locally known as West Newberry Road and Southwest Second Avenue, and runs along the northwest corner of the University of Florida.

State Road 26A contains a large sidewalk for bicycles east of SR 121. The southeast corner of this intersection is also the location of the University of Florida Golf Course.

Major intersections

The entire route is in Gainesville, Alachua County.

mi	km	Destinations	Notes
0.000	0.000	SR 26 west (University Avenue)	Western terminus
0.458	0.737	SR 121 (Southwest 34th Street) to I-75	
1.734	2.791	SR 26 (University Avenue)	Eastern terminus
1.000 mi = 1.609 km; 1.000 km = 0.621 mi

=== State Road 26 Truck ===
State Road 26 Truck
- Location: Gainesville

Florida State Truck Route 26 in Gainesville, Florida was created in order to divert trucks form the congested downtown areas of Gainesville. The route begins at the Interstate 75 at Exit 387, and follows that route south. At exit 384, the route is also joined by Truck Route 24 and both routes follow the interstate until leaving at Exit 382 to make an easterly turn onto a new overlap with State Road 121. One block after the interstate, the two truck routes encounter the southern terminus of Florida State Road 331, and SR 121 makes a sharp left turn, while Truck Routes 24 and 26 join SR 331 in an overlap are joined by Florida State Truck Route 121.. At the intersection with U.S. Route 441, the routes are joined by a truck route of that route as well. The four truck routes run northeast along SR 331 and then curve to the north. SR 331 terminates at the east end of the overlap of SRs 20, 24, and 26, which also serves as the terminus of Florida Truck Routes 24 and 26. However US 441 Truck and Florida Truck Route 121 continue to the northeast along SR 24 until reaching their respected parent routes.

=== State Road 262 ===
State Road 262
- Location: Orange Heights

State Road 262 in Orange Heights is a local access road that follows the former alignment of SR 26 prior to its southern realignment and grade separation in 2010. The road runs 0.964 miles to the north of SR 26, intersecting US 301. Overhead and street signs still label the road as Northeast State Road 26.

Browse numbered routes
← SR 261	SR 262	→ SR 263
