= List of county roads in Baker County, Florida =

- County road shields used in Florida

Highway names
- Interstates: Interstate X (I-X)
- US Highways: U.S. Highway X (US X)
- State: State Road X (SR X)
- County: County Road X (CR-X)

System links
- County roads in Florida; County roads in Baker County

The following is a list of county roads in Baker County, Florida. All county roads are maintained by the county in which they reside, although not all routes are marked with standard county road shields.

== List ==
Route	Road Name(s)	From	To	Notes
CR 23A	Woodlawn Road Lowder Street, North Boulevard Woodlawn Road	CR 125 south of Glen St. Mary SR 228 in Macclenny CR 23B in Macclenny	I-10 / SR 121 in Macclenny CR 23B / CR 228 (N. Fifth Street) and North Boulevard East in Macclenny CR 23C and Harley Thrift Road north of Macclenny	former SR 23A
CR 23B	N. Fifth Street	CR 23A (North Boulevard West) / CR 228 (N. Fifth Street) and North Boulevard East in Macclenny	CR 23A (Lowder Street) and Sands Pointe Drive in Macclenny	former SR 23B
CR 23C	Steel Bridge Road, St. Marys Cove Road	SR 121 north of Macclenny	Dead end northeast of Macclenny	former SR 23C; segment between CR 23D / Web Haven Road and the first intersection with SR 121 indicated on FDOT county map as part of CR 23C, but signed as part of CR 23D; segment east of second intersection with SR 121 signed as part of CR 23C, but is not indicated on county map to be part of any county road
CR 23D		Oak Grove Church and Cemetery north of Macclenny	Twin Bridges Farm north of Macclenny	Segment between CR 23C / Web Haven Road and SR 121 indicated on FDOT county map as part of CR 23C, but signed as part of CR 23D; segment east of SR 121 not displayed at all on either county map or Google Maps
CR 23F	Miltondale Road	Lowder Street in Macclenny	Miltondale Road / Oakdale Lane in Macclenny	former SR 23F
CR 120		CR 127 and Frederick Raulerson Road north-northeast of Sanderson	Hassie Jones Road north-northeast of Sanderson	former SR 120
CR 122		CR 125 and Doyle Williams Road in Taylor	CR 127 east-southeast of Taylor	former SR 122
CR 123	Smokey Road	Smokey Road (just south of bridge over I-10, with no access) southwest of Glen St. Mary	US 90 west of Glen St. Mary	former SR 123
CR 124		CR 229 and Harod Dobson Road west-northwest of Sanderson	CR 127 north-northeast of Sanderson	former SR 124
CR 125	Glen Avenue	SR 121 south of Glen St. Mary	CR 250 in Taylor	former SR 125
CR 127		US 90 / CR 229 in Sanderson	Near Moccasin Creek Circle north-northwest of Baxter	former SR 127
CR 130	Mud Lake Road	CR 229 south-southeast of Sanderson	SR 121 and Caprice Lane south-southeast of Glen St. Mary	former SR 130
CR 139		US 90 south of Margaretta	King Ruise Road in Margaretta	former SR 139
CR 139B		US 90 west of Glen St. Mary	CR 125 north of Glen St. Mary	former SR 139B
CR 228	N. Fifth Street	CR 23A (North Boulevard East) / CR 23B (N. Fifth Street) in Macclenny	US 90 (Macclenny Avenue) / SR 228 (Fifth Street) in Macclenny	extension of SR 228
CR 228	Maxville–Macclenny Road	I-10 / SR 228 @ exit 336	CR 228 (Maxville–Macclenny Road) at the Baker–Duval county line in Jacksonville	former SR 228
CR 229		CR 229 at the Union–Baker county line north-northwest of Raiford	CR 250 in Osceola National Forest north-northwest of Sanderson	former SR 229; unsigned concurrency with US 90 in Sanderson
CR 231	Pine Road	CR 231 at the Union–Baker county line south-southeast of Olustee	Ocean Pond Boat Ramp at Olustee Beach in Osceola National Forest north of Olustee	former SR 231
CR 250		CR 250 at the Columbia–Baker county line north-northwest of Olustee	Eddy Road northeast of Taylor	former SR 250; portion northeast of CR 125 not indicated on FDOT county map to be part of any county road
CR 250A	National Forest Road 266	US 90 east-northeast of Olustee	CR 250A at the Baker–Columbia county line north-northwest of Olustee	former SR 250A
