= Florida State Road 222 =

State highway in Florida, United States

State Road 222
- North 39th Avenue
- SR 222 highlighted in red

Route information
- Maintained by FDOT
- Length: 14.174 mi (22.811 km)

Major junctions
- West end: I-75 / CR 222 near Gainesville
- US 441 in Gainesville; SR 20 in Gainesville
- East end: SR 26 in Gainesville

Location
- Country: United States
- State: Florida
- Counties: Alachua

Highway system
- Florida State Highway System; Interstate; US; State; Former; Pre‑1945; Toll; Scenic
← US 221	→ SR 224

State Road 222 (SR 222) is a 14.174-mile-long state road that serves northern Gainesville. The western terminus is at a diamond interchange with I-75 at exit 390, and the eastern terminus is at a fork at SR 26 just east of Gainesville.

It is 4 lanes wide, but narrows to 2 lanes east of Airport Access Road, where it runs along the northwestern edges of the Newnans Lake State Forest followed by the Newnans Lake Conservation Area. At its western terminus, NW 39th Avenue continues west as two lane County Road 222 towards CR 241, a long county road.

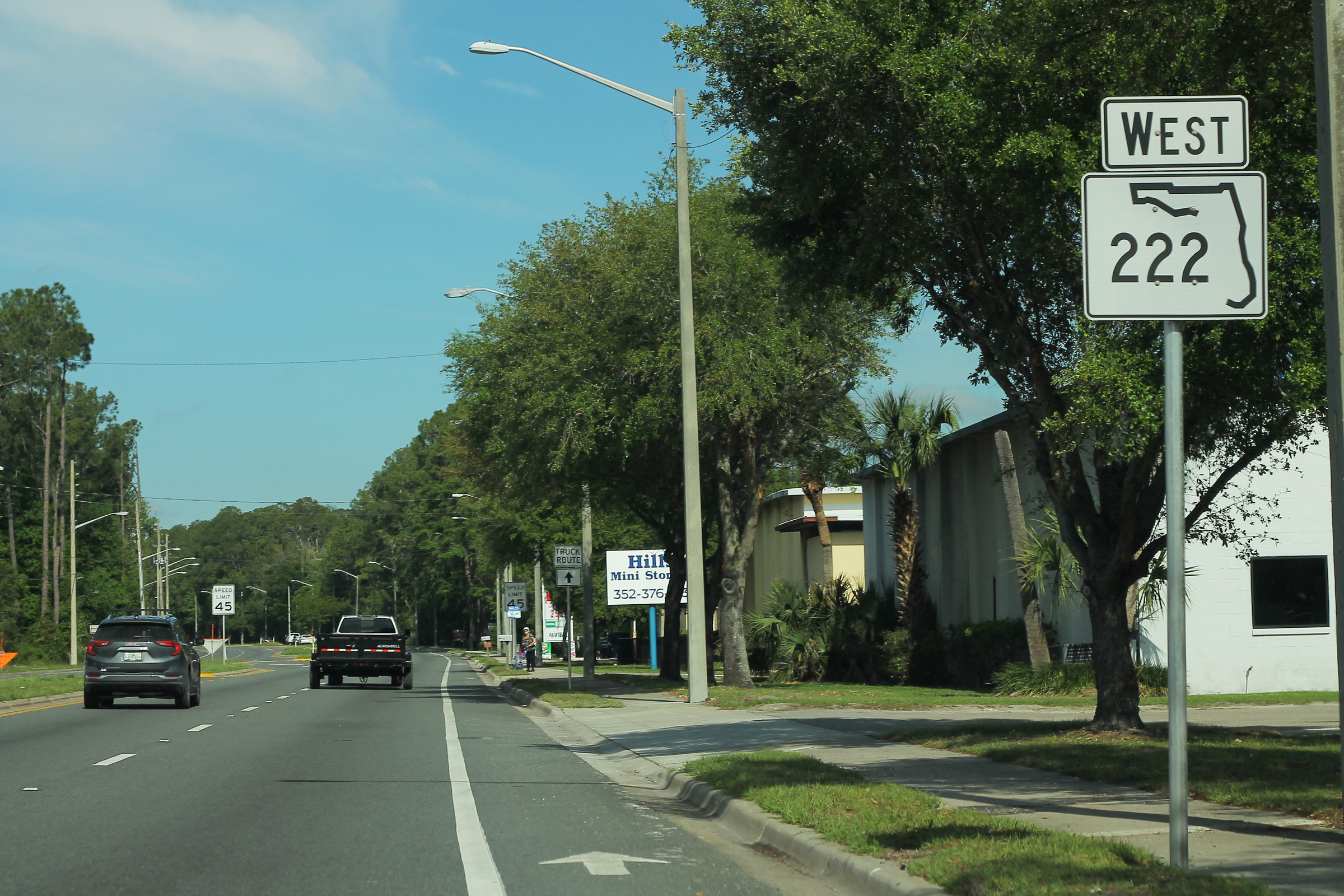
SR 222 westbound past SR 24 in Gainesville

== Major intersections ==
The entire route is in Alachua County.

Location	mi	km	Destinations	Notes
	0.000	0.000	west end of state maintenance, route continues as CR 222 (Northwest 39th Avenue) to CR 241	
	0.21	0.34	I-75 (SR 93) – Lake City, Tampa, truck route to SR 24 west / SR 26 west	I-75 exit 390
	0.40	0.64	Northwest 95th Boulevard (SR 2221 north)	
Gainesville	3.667	5.901	CR 2053 (Northwest 43rd Street)	
Gainesville	4.664	7.506	SR 121 (Northwest 34th Street) – LaCrosse, Williston	
Gainesville	6.667	10.729	US 441 (Northwest 13th Street / Dr. Martin Luther King Jr. Highway / SR 25) – truck route to SR 121 north	
Gainesville	7.157	11.518	SR 20 (Northwest 6th Street)	
Gainesville	7.849	12.632	CR 329 (North Main Street)	
Gainesville	9.716	15.636	SR 24 (Waldo Road) – Waldo, Gainesville, Hospitals, University of Florida, truck route to SR 26 east / SR 121 south / US 441 south	
Gainesville	14.174	22.811	SR 26 (Northeast 55th Boulevard) – Orange Heights, Gainesville	
1.000 mi = 1.609 km; 1.000 km = 0.621 mi

== State Road 2221 ==
State Road 2221
- Location: Alachua County

State Road 2221 is the unsigned designation for Northwest 95th Boulevard in unincorporated Alachua County. It runs for 0.791 miles (1.273 km) starting at SR 222 on the south end and ending at a cattle gap. The road runs parallel to I-75 and its northbound on-ramp from SR 222.

Browse numbered routes
← SR 1155	SR 2221	→ SR 5001
