= Florida State Road 24 =

Highway in Florida, United States

State Road 24
- SR 24 highlighted in red

Route information
- Maintained by FDOT
- Length: 71.527 mi (115.112 km)
- Existed: 1945–present

Major junctions
- West end: First Street in Cedar Key
- US 19 / US 98 in Otter Creek US 27 Alt. in Bronson; US 27 / US 41 in Archer; I-75 in Gainesville; US 441 / SR 20 / SR 26 in Gainesville
- East end: US 301 in Waldo

Location
- Country: United States
- State: Florida
- Counties: Levy, Alachua

Highway system
- Florida State Highway System; Interstate; US; State; Former; Pre‑1945; Toll; Scenic
← SR 23	→ SR 25
← SR 224	→ SR 228

State Road 24 (SR 24) is an east–west state highway that runs between Cedar Key on the Gulf of Mexico and Waldo, Florida, at US 301. State Road 24 runs along a former branch of the Seaboard Air Line Railroad. This branch was originally owned by the Florida Railway and Navigation Company, and used to lead to ferries to both Pensacola, Florida and New Orleans, Louisiana. It also passes through Rosewood, site of the infamous 1923 massacre.

== Route description ==
=== Levy County ===
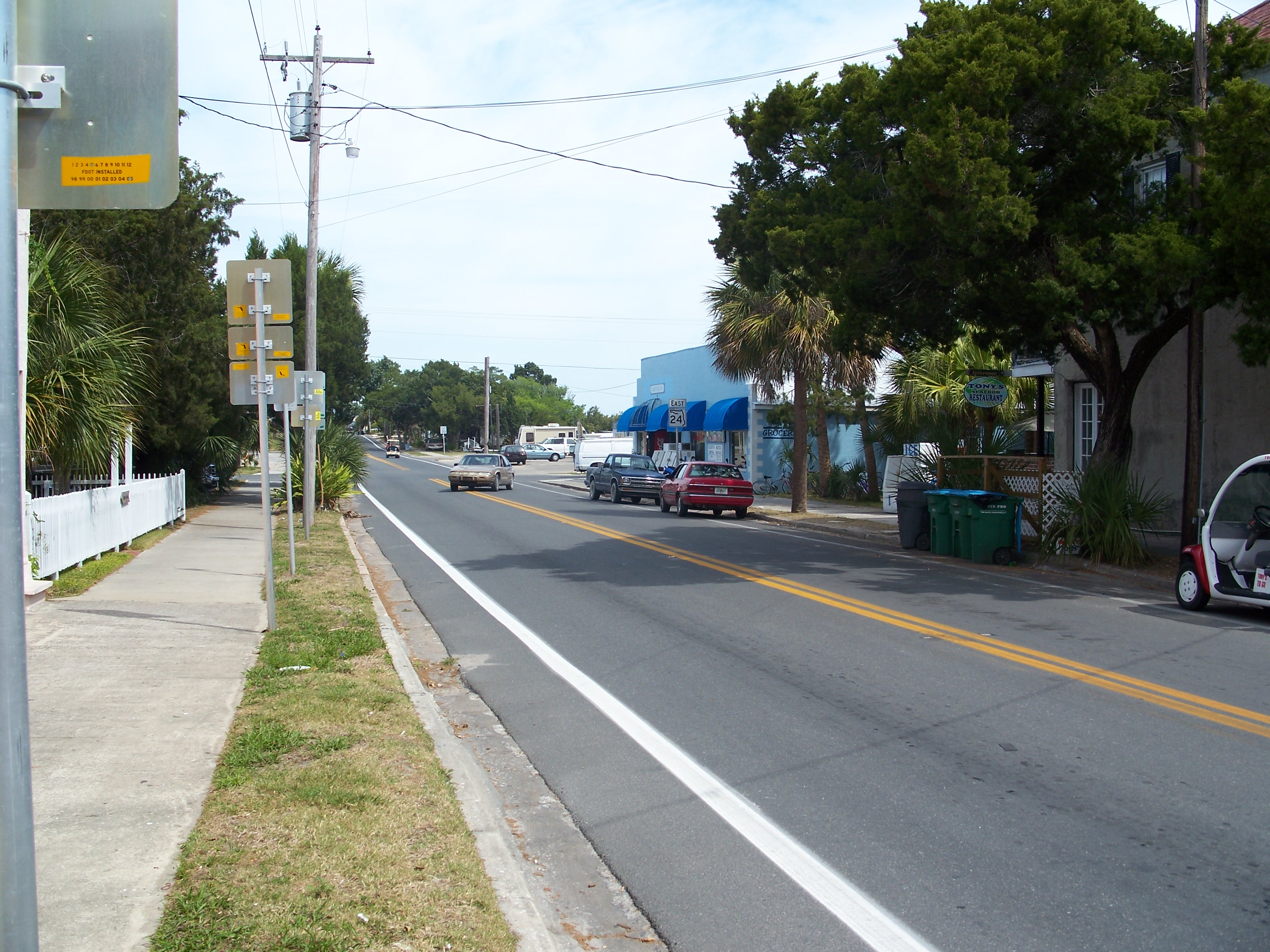
SR 24 in Cedar Key.

Starting as D Street in Cedar Key, State Road 24 skips over Jackson Island and Sunset Island before making its way across the mainland of northwestern Florida. Once on the mainland, the road runs between the Cedar Keys National Wildlife Refuge and Waccasassa Bay Preserve State Park just before a fork in the road with Levy County Road 347. Along the way intersects CR 345 in Rosewood. In the City of Otter Creek, the road intersects US 19-98, at a blinker light, which hardly looks like a city at all.

Between US 19-98 and Alternate US 27 in Bronson, the road runs through a wooded area north of Goethe State Forest, which includes preserves such as the Devil's Hammock Wildlife Management Area.

Names for State Road 24 in Levy County include D-Street, 2nd Avenue, West Thrasher Drive, East Thrasher Drive and SR 24.

=== Alachua County ===
Shortly after crossing the Levy-Alachua County Line, SR 24 becomes Archer Road and enters Archer itself, intersecting with US 27-41. After the interchange with Interstate 75 in Gainesville, State Road 24 crosses SR 121, where it runs along the south side of the University of Florida then become concurrent with US 441 (West 13th Street), later with SR 26 (University Avenue), then SR 20, until the intersection with SR 331 (Southeast 11th Street) in the east part of town. Here, SR 24 breaks off as Waldo Road, which is also overlapped with US Truck Route 441 and State Truck Route 121 until the intersection with SR 222. The northeast corner of SR 24 and SR 222 (North 39th Avenue) is the site of the Gainesville Regional Airport, while the rest of the road runs through the University of Florida Austin Carey Forest before finally terminating at an interchange with US 301 in Waldo.

Names for State Road 24 in Alachua County include SR 24, Archer Road, 13th Street, University Avenue, Waldo Road, and Kennard Street (westbound lanes in Waldo).

== Major intersections ==
County	Location	mi	km	Destinations	Notes
Levy	Cedar Key	0.000	0.000	2nd Street	
Levy		3.248	5.227	CR 347 north – Lower Suwannee National Wildlife Refuge, Shell Mound	
Levy	Rosewood	9.401	15.129	CR 345 north – Chiefland, Perry	
Levy	Ellzey	19.752	31.788	CR 336 west	
Levy	Otter Creek	21.618	34.791	US 19 / US 98 (SR 55) – Chiefland, Inglis, St. Petersburg	
Levy	Bronson	32.404	52.149	CR 24 east (Picnic Street)	
Levy	Bronson	32.932	52.999	US 27 Alt. (SR 500) – Chiefland, Williston	
Levy	Bronson	33.169	53.380	CR 337 (Court Street) – Newberry	
Levy	Bronson	33.514	53.936	CR 32B north (Marshburn Drive)	
Levy		34.638	55.744	CR 32 west	
Alachua	Archer	42.637	68.618	US 27 / US 41 (SR 45) – Newberry, Williston	
Alachua	Gainesville	52.39	84.31	I-75 (SR 93) – Lake City, Tampa, truck route to SR 24 east / SR 26 east	I-75 exit 384
Alachua	Gainesville	53.467	86.047	SR 121 (Southwest 34th Street) – Museum of Natural History, Museum of Art	
Alachua	Gainesville	54.708	88.044	SR 226 east / SR 24A east (Southwest 16th Avenue)	eastbound exit and westbound entrance
Alachua	Gainesville	55.734	89.695	US 441 south (Southwest 13th Street / SR 25)	west end of US 441 / SR 25 overlap
Alachua	Gainesville	56.433	90.820	US 441 north (Southwest 13th Street / SR 25) / SR 26 west (West University Avenue) to I-75	east end of US 441 / SR 25 overlap; west end of SR 26 overlap
Alachua	Gainesville	57.295	92.207	SR 20 west (Main Street)	west end of SR 20 overlap; Former SR 329 south to SR 331
Alachua	Gainesville	58.100	93.503	SR 20 east / SR 26 east (East University Avenue) – Morningside Nature Center SR 331 south / SR 24A west (Southeast 11th Street) to I-75 – truck route to SR 24 west / SR 26 west	east end of SR 20 / SR 26 overlap
Alachua	Gainesville	59.842	96.306	SR 120 west (Northeast 23rd Avenue)	
Alachua	Gainesville	60.740	97.752	SR 222 (Northeast 39th Avenue) to I-75 – Santa Fe College, SFC Police Academy, Airport Passenger Terminal, truck route to SR 121 north / US 441 north	
Alachua		62.138	100.001	CR 225 north / CR 232 west (Northeast 53rd Avenue) – Gainesville Raceway	
Alachua	Fairbanks	64.064	103.101	CR 225A west (Northeast 56th Terrace)	
Alachua	Waldo	71.014	114.286	CR 1475 north (Cole Street) to US 301 south	
Alachua	Waldo	71.527	115.112	US 301 (SR 200) – Starke, Baldwin	interchange
1.000 mi = 1.609 km; 1.000 km = 0.621 mi: Concurrency terminus; Incomplete access

== Related routes ==
=== State Road 24A ===
State Road 24A
- Location: Gainesville
- Length: 3.997 mi (6.433 km)

State Road 226
- Location: Gainesville
- Length: 2.201 mi (3.542 km)

State Road 24A (SR 24A) is an alternate route within Gainesville. It is overlapped by State Road 226 (Southwest 16th Avenue and Southeast 16th Avenue), and then State Road 331 from SR 226 to SR 20/26, where it terminates at SR 24 again.

The west end of SRs 24A/226 is only accessible eastbound from SR 24 and westbound to SR 24. Motorists who want to travel in the opposite direction must use nearby Shealy Drive. At US 441 the road transforms from a four-lane divided highway to a four-lane undivided highway with a continuous left-turn lane. The divider returns again east of Southwest 10th Avenue, but ends east of Southwest 6th Street. SR 24A-226 runs along Southwest 16th Avenue, and becomes Southeast 16th Avenue, when it crosses SR 329 and narrows down to two lanes.

The road curves down to a southbound direction and has frequent pedestrian crosswalks across it before curving back east. SR 226 ends at SR 331, however SR 24A continues north along SR 331 until it reaches the intersection of SR 20-24-26.

The entire route is in Gainesville, Alachua County.

mi	km	Destinations	Notes
0.000	0.000	SR 24 west (Archer Road) / SR 226 begins	Western end of SR 226 overlap
0.924	1.487	US 441 (Southwest 13th Street / Dr. Martin Luther King Jr. Highway / SR 25)	
1.651	2.657	CR 329 (South Main Street)	Former SR 329
2.201	3.542	SR 331 south (Southeast Williston Road) / SR 226 ends	Eastern end of SR 226; western end of SR 331 overlap
3.997	6.433	SR 20 / SR 24 west / SR 26 (East University Avenue) – Matheson Historical Center, Morningside Nature Center SR 331 ends (SE 11th Street) / SR 24 east (Waldo Road) to US 441 / SR 121 – Airport	Eastern end of SR 331 overlap
1.000 mi = 1.609 km; 1.000 km = 0.621 mi: Concurrency terminus

=== County Road 24 ===
County Road 24
- Location: Bronson
- Length: 0.76 mi (1,220 m)

County Road 24 is a short county road spur of SR 24 in Bronson. It travels 0.76 miles (1.22 km) west of SR 24 to U.S. Highway 27 Alternate and is known locally as Picnic Street.

=== State Road 24 Truck ===
State Road 24 Truck
- Location: Gainesville

Florida State Truck Route 24 in Gainesville, Florida was established in order to divert trucks form the congested downtown areas of Gainesville. The route begins at the Interstate 75 at Exit 384, and follows that route south, having also joined Truck Route 26 which ran southbound along I-75 since Exit 387. Both routes follow the interstate until leaving at Exit 382 to make an easterly turn onto a new overlap with State Road 121. One block after the interstate, the two truck routes encounter the southern terminus of Florida State Road 331, and SR 121 makes a sharp left turn, while Truck Routes 24 and 26 join SR 331 in an overlap are joined by Florida State Truck Route 121. At the intersection with U.S. Route 441, the routes are joined by a truck route of that route as well. The four truck routes run northeast along SR 331 past the eastern terminus of Florida State Road 226, and are also joined by another overlap, this time with Florida State Road 24A. This makes a total of five overlapping routes with SR 331, which curves from northeast to the north. Florida State Truck Route 24/SR 24A/Truck Route 26/SR 331 terminates at the east end of the overlap of SRs 20, 24, and 26. However US 441 Truck and Florida Truck Route 121 continue to the northeast along SR 24 until reaching their respected parent routes.
