= Paradise, Florida =

Former unincorporated community in Florida, US

Coordinates: 29°42′18″N 82°20′43″W

Paradise was an unincorporated community in Alachua County, Florida, United States. It has been annexed into the city of Gainesville, and is located approximately where Alachua County Road 232 (N.W. 53rd Avenue) crosses U.S. Route 441.

The area around Paradise was settled in the 1830s. A station was built on the recently completed Savannah, Florida and Western Railway line between High Springs and Gainesville in 1885, and named Paradise after one of the farm fields in the area. By 1888 the community included some twenty houses, the railroad station and a school. A post office was established in 1885, and closed in 1908. Part of the area of Paradise was annexed into Gainesville in 1961. The remainder of Paradise was annexed into Gainesville in 1992.
