= Traxler, Florida =

Ghost town in Alachua County, Florida, USA

Coordinates: 29°52′N 82°32′W

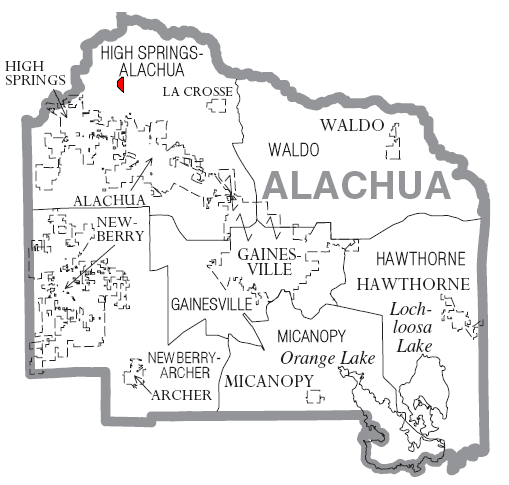
Location within county from https://www.census.gov

Traxler is a ghost town located in Alachua County, Florida, just north of the city of Alachua. The remnants can be accessed from Interstate 75 at Alachua CR 236) (Exit 404), the northernmost interchange along I-75 in Alachua County.

== History ==
William H. Traxler, son of settlers from South Carolina, was born near the natural bridge in Columbia County in 1854. In the 1880s he acquired property in Alachua County on the Bellamy Road, opened a general store, and began farming. He married the daughter of Simeon Dell, Mary Lelia, in 1889. Prospering, he increased his holdings and enlarged the commissary. The post office, established in 1891 with Mr. Traxler as postmaster, was discontinued in 1906. At one time the community had a one-room school, a number of tenant farm homes, a cotton gin, grist mill, and church.

As of 2010, the Spring Hill United Methodist Church, which was founded in 1860, continued to meet in Traxler.

== See also ==
- List of ghost towns in Florida

== Gallery ==
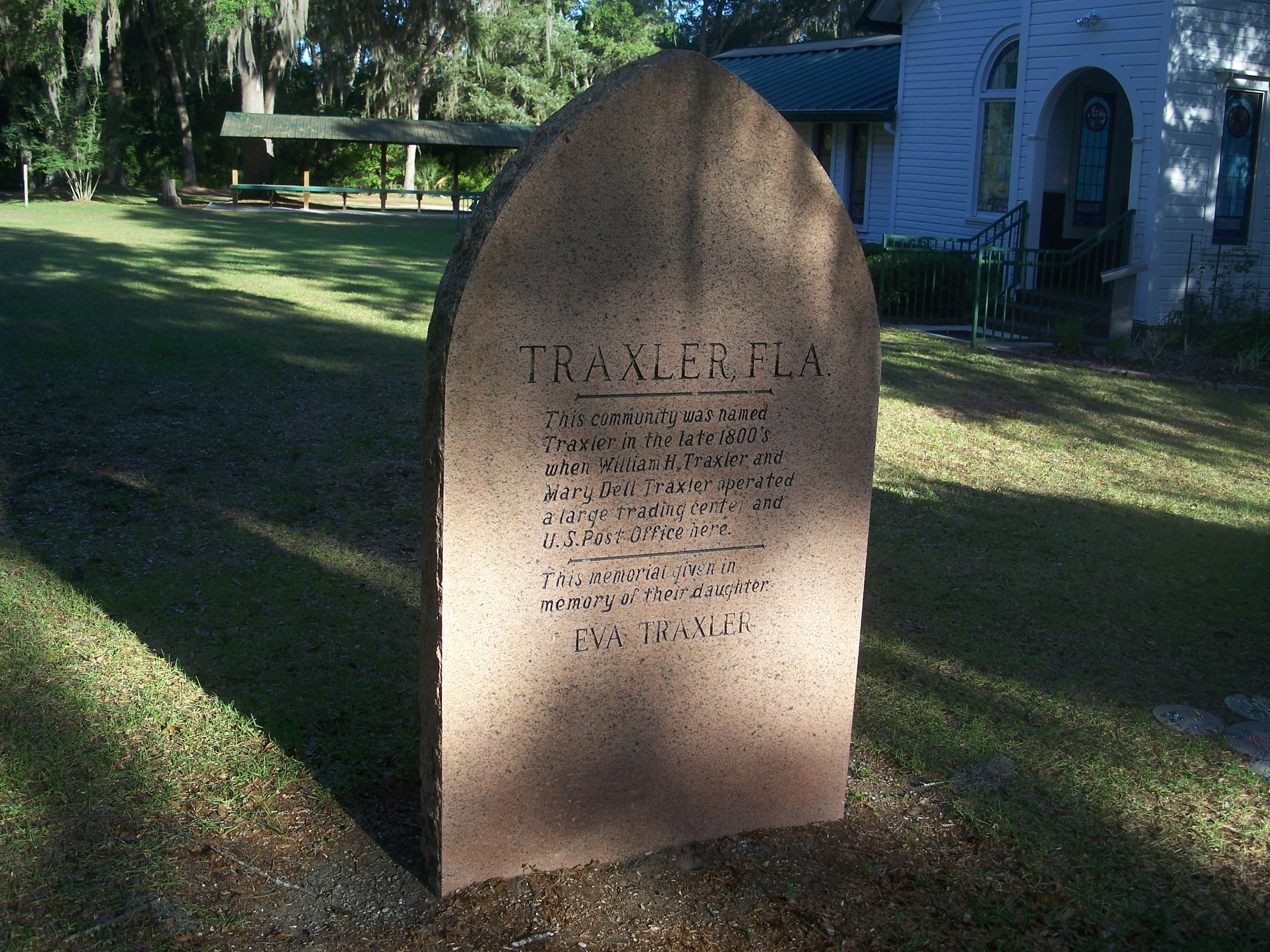
Memorial

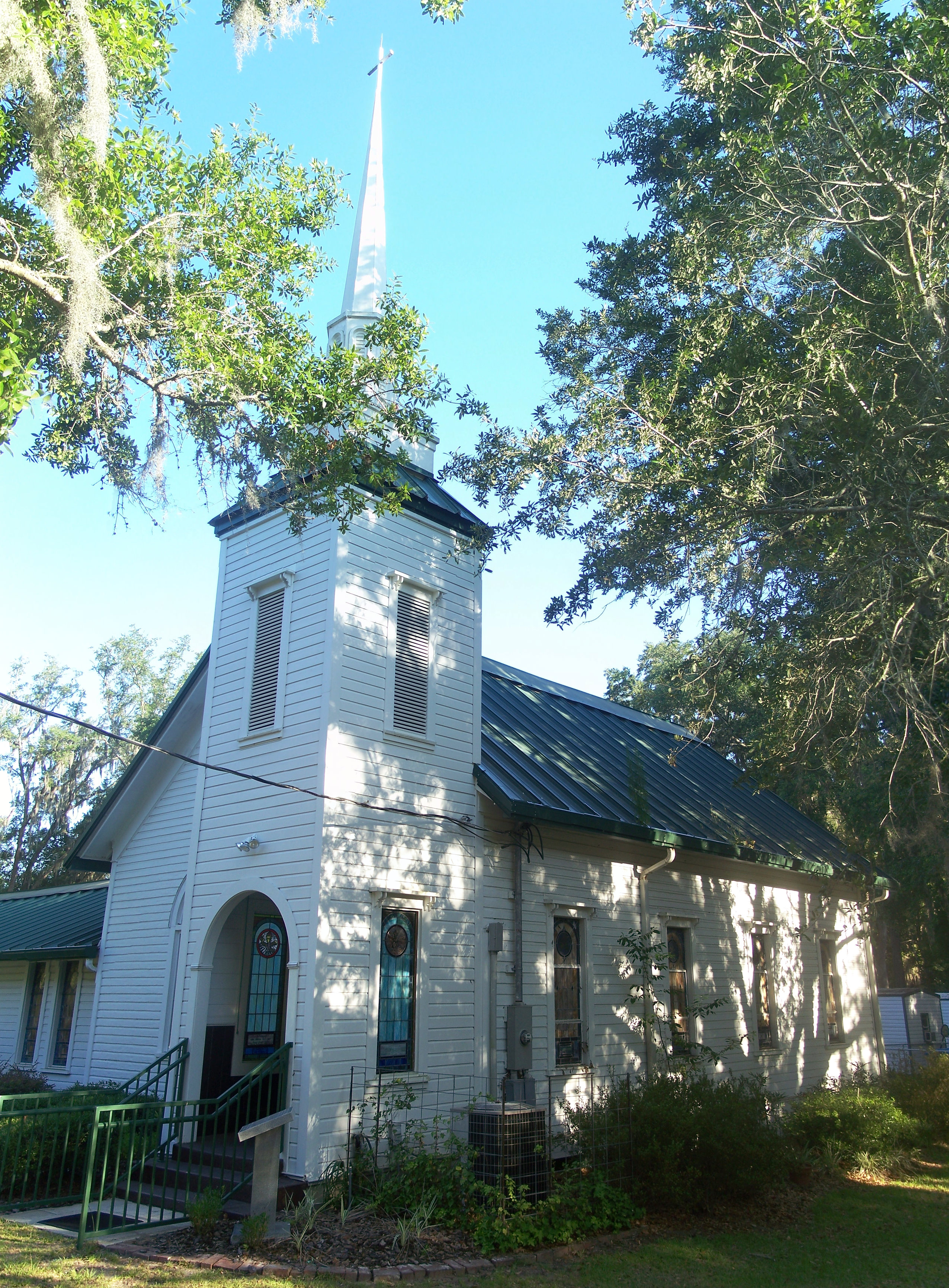
Springhill Methodist Church

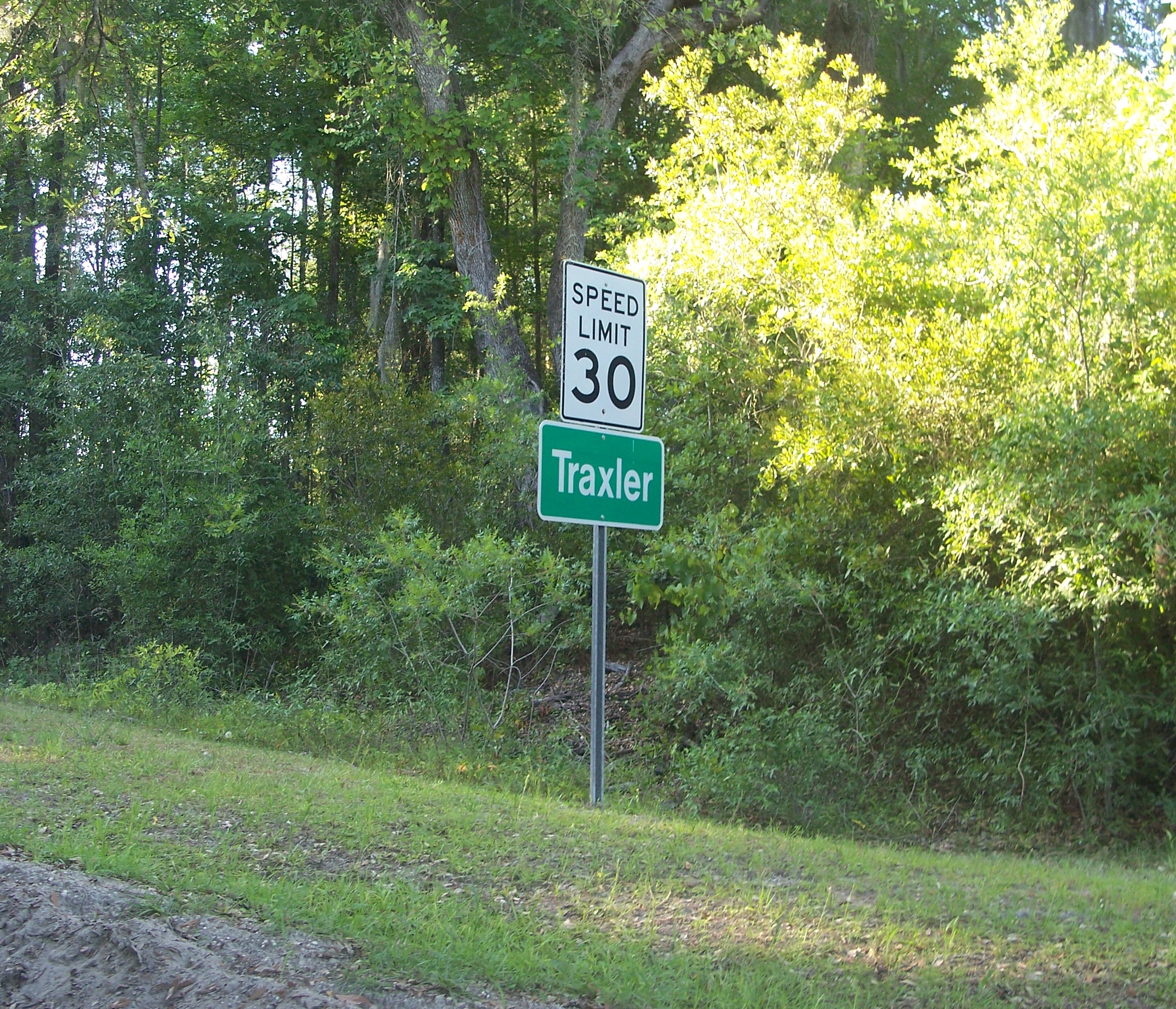
Sign for a road entering Traxler
