= Putnam Hall, Florida =

Unincorporated community in Florida, U.S.

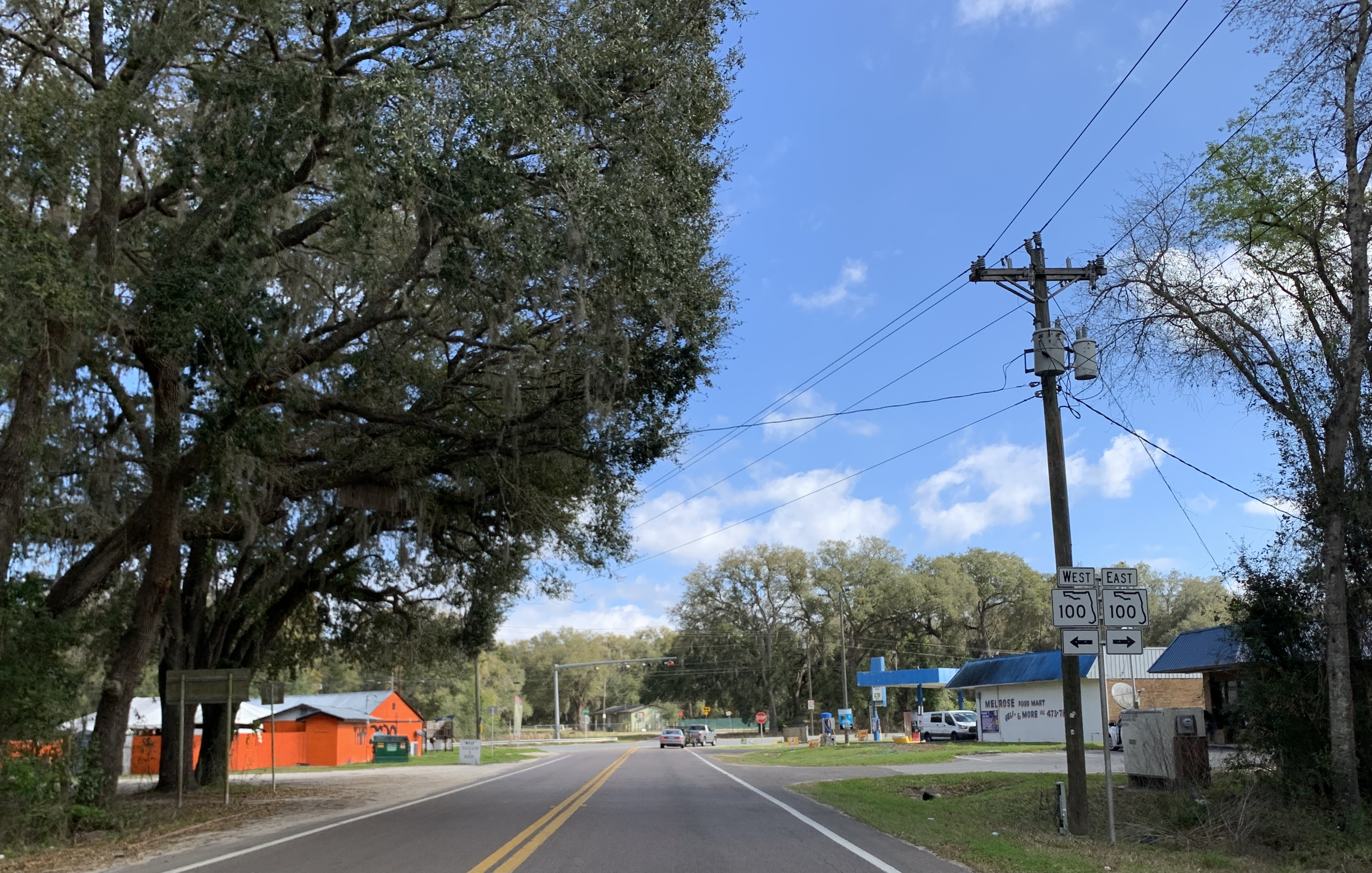
Putnam Hall

Putnam Hall is an unincorporated community in Putnam County, Florida, United States. It is located near the State Road 100/State Road 26 intersection.

It was settled by Elijah Wall of South Carolina in 1849. This was the home of Putnam county's first representative to legislature, Wall's son John P Wall, who while living there served six sessions as a representative.

== Geography ==
Putnam Hall is located at 29°44′11″N 81°57′34″W (29.7364, -81.9594).
