= Grove Park, Florida =

Unincorporated community in Florida, US

Coordinates: 29°36′01″N 82°09′12″W

Grove Park is an unincorporated community in Alachua County, Florida, United States, on Florida State Road 20 west of Hawthorne.

Grove Park was established in the early 1880s on the Florida Southern Railway. In 1888, the community had 250 residents, a railroad station, post office, two stores, a hotel, school, church and a saw and planing mill. The 60-to-80-foot (18 to 24 m) wide streets were laid out in a rectangular grid, and were graded.

The post office was opened in 1883, and closed in 1958.
