= Choctaw Beach, Florida =

Choctaw Beach
- Community
- Interactive map of Choctaw Beach
- Coordinates: 30°28′16.68″N 86°20′35.88″W
- Country: United States
- State: Florida
- County: Walton County
- Area code: 850

Choctaw Beach, Florida, is a community located west of Freeport, Florida, and Portland, Florida, and east of Niceville, Florida. It is located along the shores of the Choctawhatchee Bay.

The Walton County Fire Station 10 is located in Choctaw Beach. The fire station is usually staffed by only two firefighters at a time.
