= Fairbanks, Florida =

Populated place in Florida, US

Coordinates: 29°43′29″N 82°15′50″W

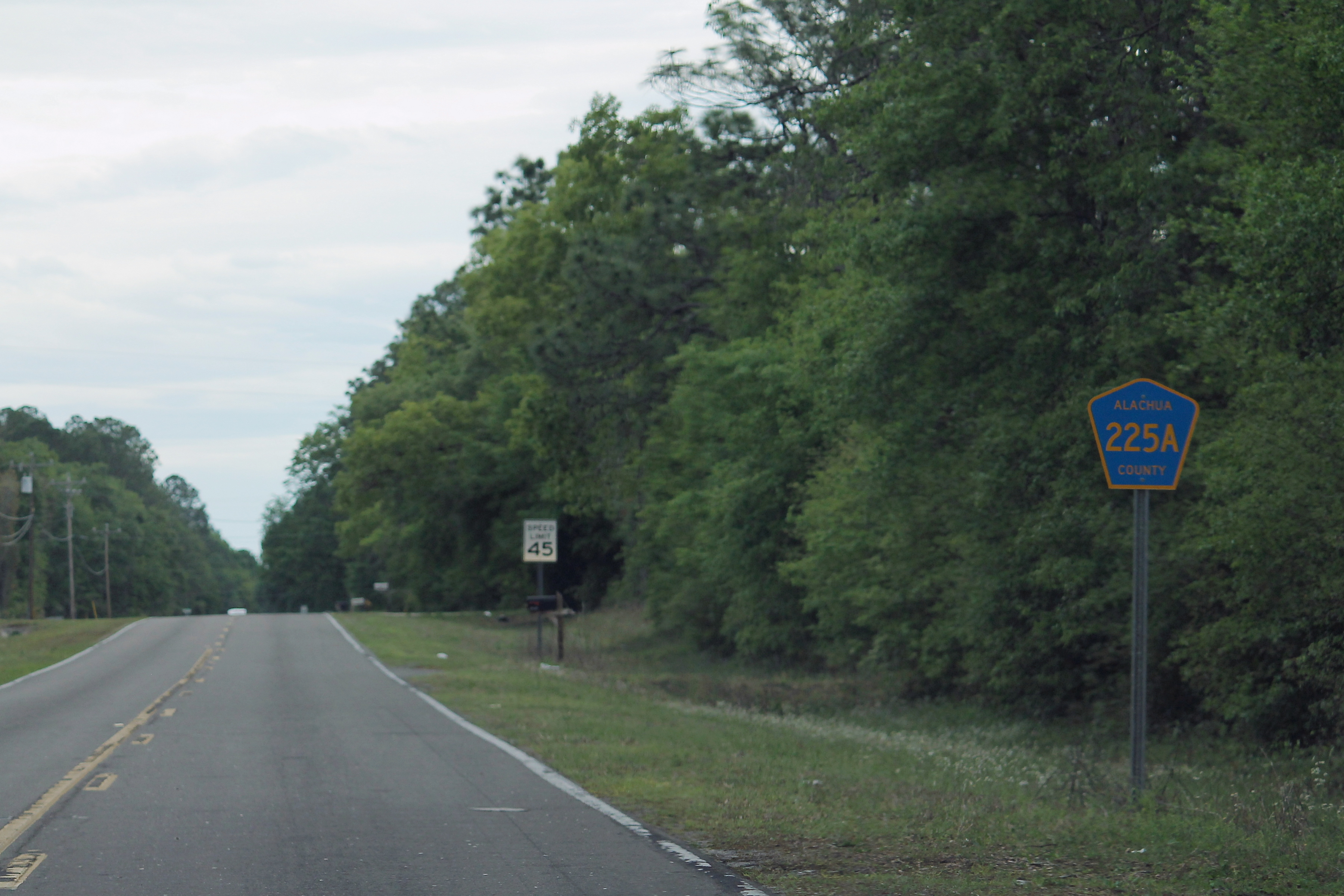
Fairbanks, Florida

Fairbanks is an unincorporated community in Alachua County, Florida, United States. It is located along Florida State Road 24 between Gainesville and Waldo.

== History ==
Fairbanks was established in 1873 by C. D. Furman, on the Atlantic, Gulf and West India Transit Company, commonly known as "the Transit railroad" and which eventually became part of the Seaboard Air Line Railway. The rail line was removed late in the 20th century. The community is named after George Rainsford Fairbanks. Furman purchased 1,084 acres (439 ha) and sold 20-acre (8.1 ha) lots. In 1883, the community had a post office, three merchants, an Episcopal church, and a school with about 30 students, with prospects that a hotel would be constructed. Most of the residents that year were originally from the Northern United States. Furman had fruit- and nut-bearing trees in production, including date, Japanese plum, orange, peach, grape, almond, pecan, Spanish chestnut, and walnut. Vegetable growing was also important in the community. The post office was established in 1875, and closed in 1943.
