= Florida State Road 120 =

State highway in Florida, United States

State Road 120
- North 23rd Avenue
- SR 120 highlighted in red

Route information
- Maintained by FDOT
- Length: 2.544 mi (4.094 km)

Major junctions
- West end: US 441 in Gainesville
- East end: SR 24 in Gainesville

Location
- Country: United States
- State: Florida
- Counties: Alachua

Highway system
- Florida State Highway System; Interstate; US; State; Former; Pre‑1945; Toll; Scenic
← SR 117	→ SR 121

State Road 120 (SR 120) is a state highway in the U.S. state of Florida. Known as North 23rd Avenue, the state highway runs 2.5 miles (4.0 km) from U.S. Route 441 (US 441) east to SR 24 within Gainesville.

== Route description ==
SR 120 begins at an intersection with US 441 (N.W. 13th Street north of downtown Gainesville; N.W. 23rd Avenue continues west of the intersection as an unnumbered street. SR 120 heads east as a four-lane undivided highway through a mixed residential and commercial area. The highway intersects SR 20 (N.W. 6th Street) and enters the northeast quadrant of Gainesville at an abandoned rail line. East of the address axis, SR 120 intersects County Road 329 (Main Street) and continues through a residential area. The highway reaches its eastern terminus at an intersection with SR 24 (Waldo Road). The roadway continues east across the Waldo Road Greenway, which parallels the eastbound side of SR 24, to a gate for the Tacachale developmental disability community.

== Major intersections ==
The entire route is in Gainesville, Alachua County.

mi	km	Destinations	Notes
0.000	0.000	US 441 (Northwest 13th Street / Dr. Martin Luther King Jr. Highway / SR 25)	Western terminus
0.502	0.808	SR 20 (Northwest 6th Street)	
1.062	1.709	CR 329 (North Main Street)	
2.544	4.094	SR 24 (Waldo Road)	Eastern terminus
1.000 mi = 1.609 km; 1.000 km = 0.621 mi
