= Orange Heights, Florida =

Unincorporated community in Florida, US

Coordinates: 29°43′11″N 82°08′21″W

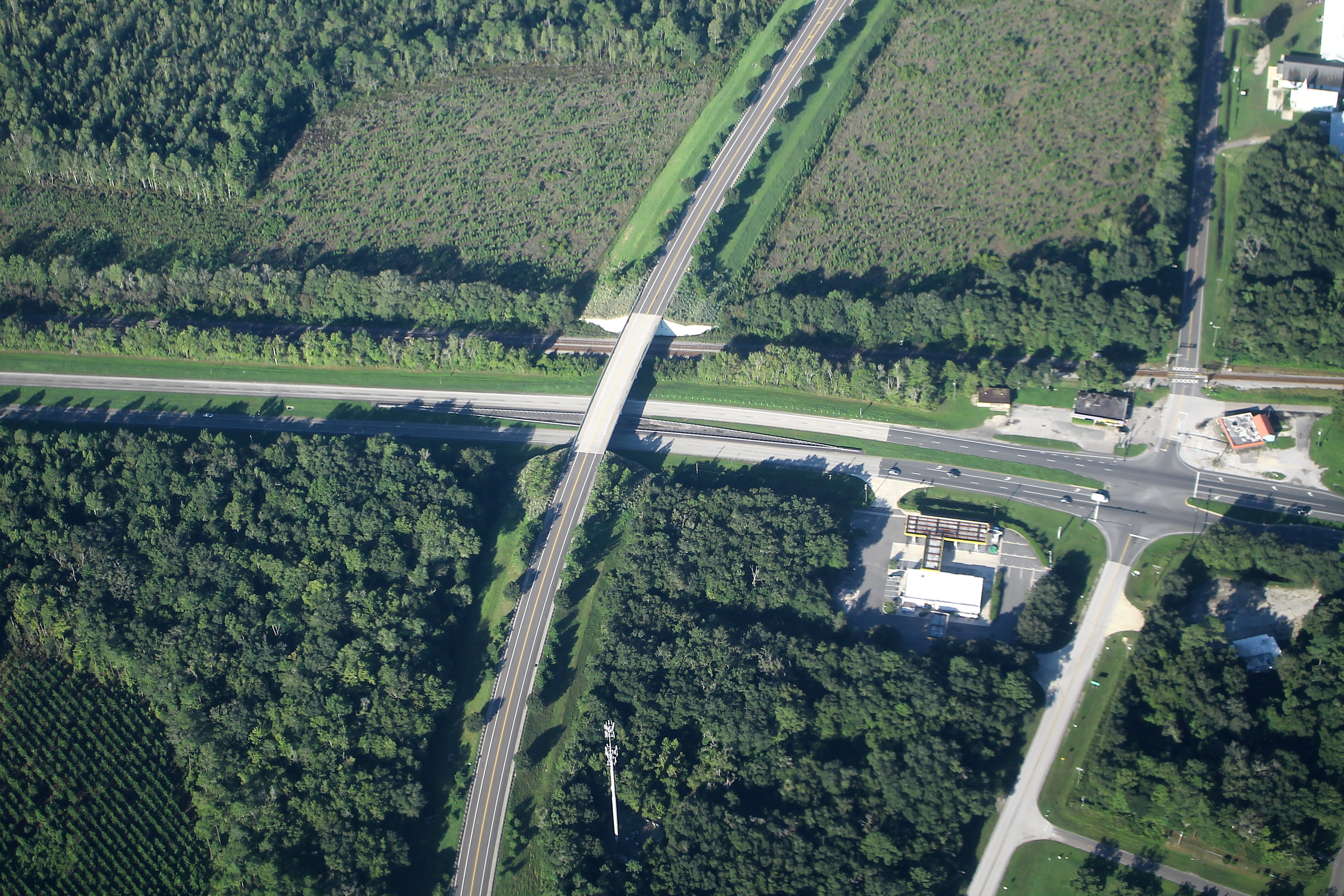
Aerial photograph of Orange Heights, Florida

Orange Heights is an unincorporated community in Alachua County, Florida, United States. It is located at the intersection of U.S. Route 301 and Florida State Road 26.

== History ==
Orange Heights was founded on the Peninsula Railroad (now CSX Transportation's Wildwood Subdivision), which ran from Waldo to Ocala.

In 1891 Orange Heights had a population of more than 300 people. It had a school, a church, a hotel, three general stores, a cotton gin, a blacksmith, and a sawmill.

In 2010–2011 an overpass was constructed carrying State Road 26 over U.S. 301 and the CSX tracks at Orange Heights.
