= Windsor, Alachua County, Florida =

Unincorporated community in Florida, U.S.

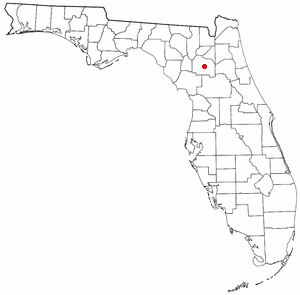
Location of Windsor, Florida

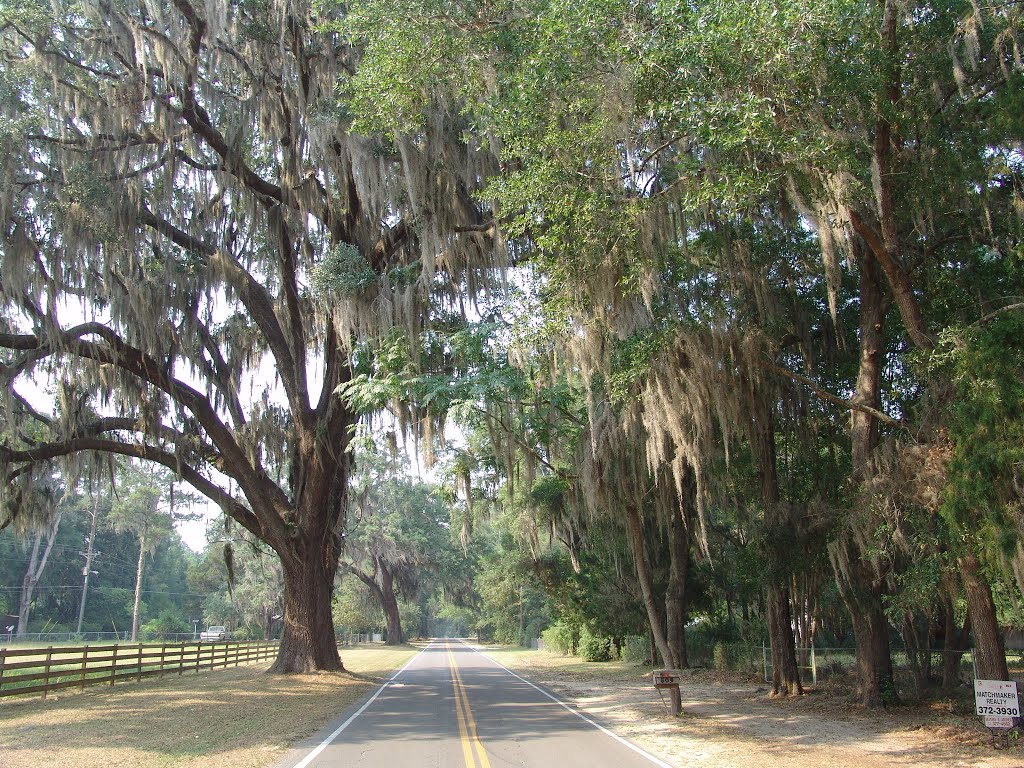
The single main road in Windsor

Windsor is an unincorporated community in Alachua County, Florida, United States. As of the 2010 census, it had a population of 256.

== Geography ==
Windsor is located in central Alachua County, east of Gainesville, at 29°38′48″N 82°11′10″W, and has a total area of 0.8776 sq mi (2.273 km^{2}).

== History ==
Windsor was named by English cotton planters who settled the town in 1846. New residents from both northern and southern states were attracted by the development of citrus culture in the area. By the end of the Reconstruction era, Windsor was prospering, and in 1884 a post office was established. The town had a population of over 400 in the mid-1880s. In the 1890s the town boasted a doctor, three stores, a real estate office, a grist mill, two sawmills, and factories producing boxes, cedar baskets and fertilizer. Severe freezes in 1884, 1895, and 1899 devastated the orange groves and as a result Windsor's population declined. The post office closed in 1936.

== Events ==
Windsor is known for its annual Zucchini Festival in May.
