= LaCrosse, Florida =

Town in the state of Florida, United States

- Town
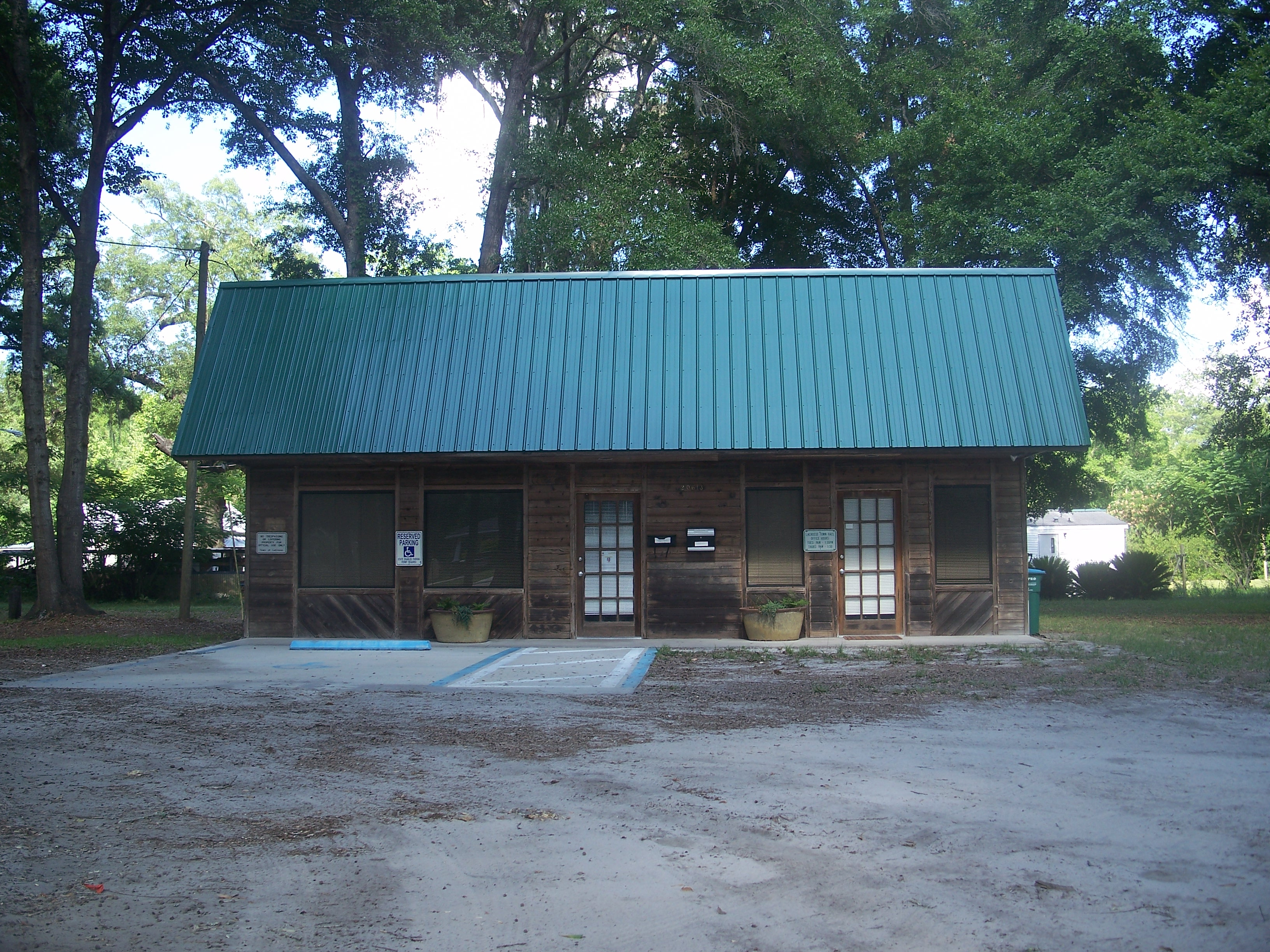
- LaCrosse Town Hall
- Motto(s): "Rooted in History, Growing Towards Tomorrow", "Potato District"
- Location in Alachua County and the state of Florida
- Coordinates: 29°50′18″N 82°22′20″W
- Country: United States
- State: Florida
- County: Alachua
- Settled (Rome): c. 1830s–1840s
- Settled (LaCrosse): April 22, 1881
- Incorporated (Town of LaCrosse): December 17, 1897
- Reincorporated (Town of LaCrosse): 1957
- Named after: La Crosse, Wisconsin

Government
  - Type: Mayor-Council
  - Mayor: C. Dianne Dubberly
  - Vice Mayor: Anthony Kelley
  - Councilors: Karen Kelley, Therese McSwain, Kyle Cheshire, and Barbara Thomas
  - Town Clerk: Crystal Phillips
  - Town Attorney: John E. Maines IV

Area
  - Total: 4.70 sq mi (12.17 km^{2})
  - Land: 4.63 sq mi (11.99 km^{2})
  - Water: 0.073 sq mi (0.19 km^{2})
- Elevation: 148 ft (45 m)

Population (2020)
  - Total: 316
  - Density: 68.3/sq mi (26.36/km^{2})
- Time zone: UTC-5 (Eastern (EST))
  - Summer (DST): UTC-4 (EDT)
- ZIP code: 32658
- Area code(s): 904, 324
- FIPS code: 12-37300
- GNIS feature ID: 2405962
- Website: townoflacrosse.net

LaCrosse or La Crosse is a town in Alachua County, Florida, 15 miles (24 km) north of Gainesville. The LaCrosse is part of the Gainesville, Florida Metropolitan Statistical Area. As of the 2020 US census, the town population was 316, down from 360 in 2010 US Census.

The area around LaCrosse is devoted to agriculture, especially potatoes; the area is known as the "Potato District." Other products of the area include tobacco, vegetables, and cattle.

== History ==
The earliest known non-indigenous people settled the area between the 1830s and 1840s, and the first known settler was a French immigrant named John Cellon. LaCrosse was an agricultural village by 1860, in an area mostly given over to cotton farming at the time. The community was named "Rome" until being renamed "'LaCrosse" when the post office was opened on April 22, 1881. In 1884, LaCrosse Missionary Baptist Church was established. LaCrosse was first incorporated as a town on December 17, 1897, and named after early settlers from La Crosse, Wisconsin, which in turn was named after the Native American sport. In the early 1900s, the boll weevil devastated LaCrosse's cotton crops, so farmers were forced to growing potatoes instead, which contributed to its nickname "Potato District." Other significant crops grown in LaCrosse have been vegetables (including corn) and tobacco, as well as raising cattle. The Town of LaCrosse was officially reincorporated as a municipality in 1957.

== Geography ==
According to the United States Census Bureau, the town has a total area of 4.4 square miles (11.5 km^{2}), of which 4.4 square miles (11.3 km^{2}) is land and 0.077 square miles (0.2 km^{2}), or 1.61%, is water.

=== Climate ===
The climate in this area is characterized by hot, humid summers and generally mild winters. According to the Köppen climate classification, the Town of LaCrosse has a humid subtropical climate zone (Cfa).

== Demographics ==
Historical population
Census	Pop.	Note	%±
1930	374		—
1940	192		−48.7%
1950	146		−24.0%
1960	165		13.0%
1970	365		121.2%
1980	170		−53.4%
1990	122		−28.2%
2000	143		17.2%
2010	360		151.7%
2020	316		−12.2%
U.S. Decennial Census

=== 2010 and 2020 census ===
LaCrosse racial composition (Hispanics excluded from racial categories) (NH = Non-Hispanic)
Race	Pop 2010	Pop 2020	% 2010	% 2020
White (NH)	222	186	61.67%	58.86%
Black or African American (NH)	65	46	18.06%	14.56%
Native American or Alaska Native (NH)	1	0	0.28%	0.00%
Asian (NH)	2	6	0.56%	1.90%
Pacific Islander or Native Hawaiian (NH)	0	0	0.00%	0.00%
Some other race (NH)	0	3	0.00%	0.95%
Two or more races/Multiracial (NH)	11	22	3.06%	6.96%
Hispanic or Latino (any race)	59	53	16.39%	16.77%
Total	360	316		

As of the 2020 United States census, there were 316 people, 108 households, and 86 families residing in the town.

As of the 2010 United States census, there were 360 people, 124 households, and 105 families residing in the town.

=== 2000 census ===
As of the census of 2000, there were 143 people, 62 households, and 37 families residing in the town. The population density was 106.9 inhabitants per square mile (41.3/km^{2}). There were 64 housing units at an average density of 47.8 units per square mile (18.5 units/km^{2}). The racial makeup of the town was 76.92% White, 21.68% African American, and 1.40% from two or more races. Hispanic or Latino of any race were 6.99% of the population.

In 2000, there were 62 households, out of which 19.4% had children under the age of 18 living with them, 45.2% were married couples living together, 8.1% had a female householder with no husband present, and 40.3% were non-families. 32.3% of all households were made up of individuals, and 8.1% had someone living alone who was 65 years of age or older. The average household size was 2.31 and the average family size was 2.89.

In 2000, in the town, the population was spread out, with 17.5% under the age of 18, 10.5% from 18 to 24, 25.9% from 25 to 44, 31.5% from 45 to 64, and 14.7% who were 65 years of age or older. The median age was 42 years. For every 100 females, there were 107.2 males. For every 100 females age 18 and over, there were 110.7 males.

In 2000, the median income for a household in the town was $22,750, and the median income for a family was $29,583. Males had a median income of $24,286 versus $31,250 for females. The per capita income for the town was $13,633. There were 22.9% of families and 28.5% of the population living below the poverty line, including 28.6% of under eighteens and 65.0% of those over 64.

== Education ==
LaCrosse is served by the School Board of Alachua County. The Alachua County Library District serves LaCrosse with a weekly bookmobile stop.

== Notable person ==
- Hewritt Dixon (1940–1992), former NFL football player
