= Archer, Florida =

- City
- City of Archer, Florida
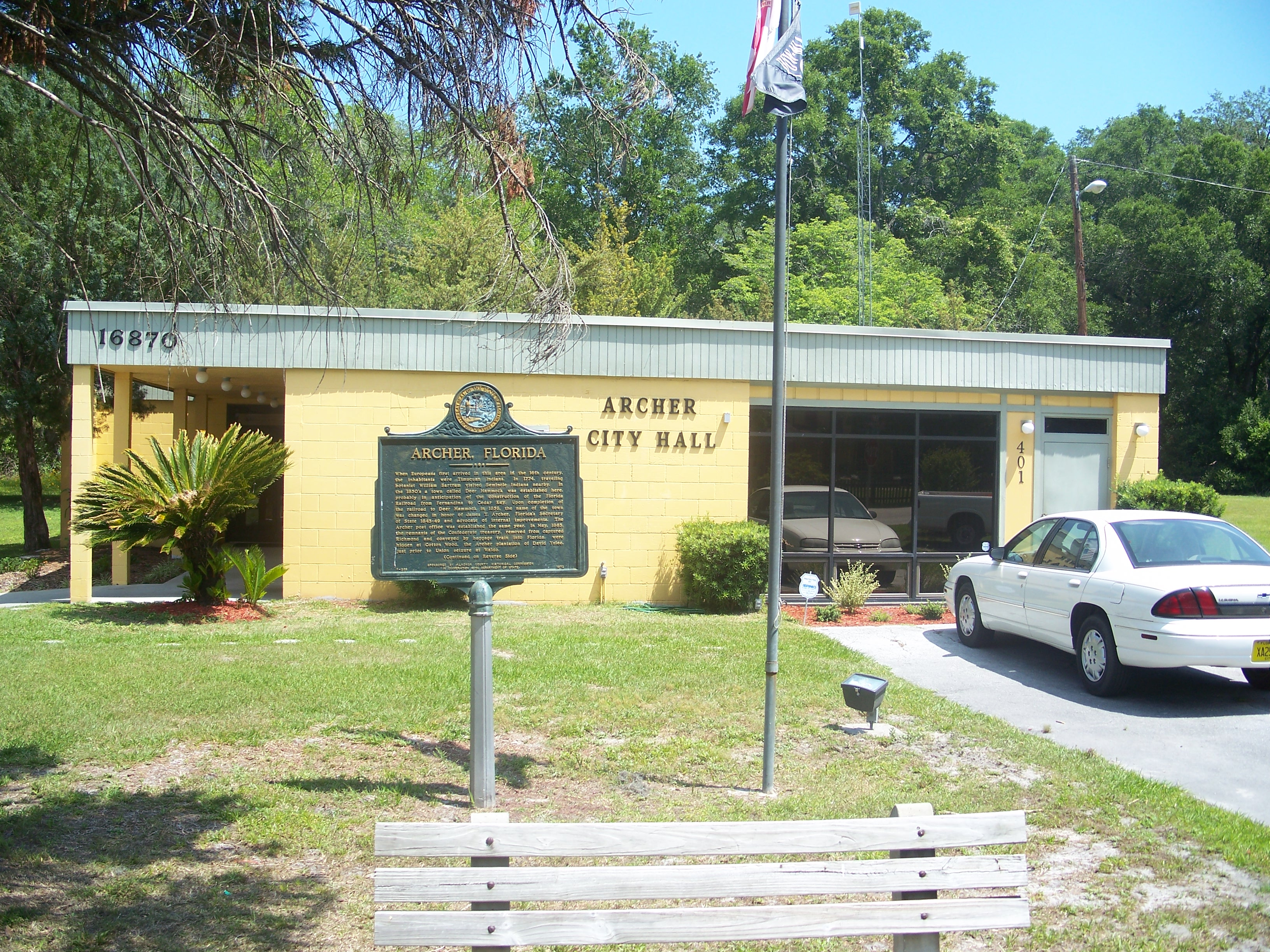
- Archer City Hall
- Motto: "Taking Pride in Our Community"
- Location of Archer in Alachua County, Florida.

- Location within Florida Location within the United States Location within North America
- Coordinates: 29°31′53″N 82°31′11″W
- Country: United States
- State: Florida
- County: Alachua
- Settled (Deer Hammock - Darden's Hammock): c. 1840s
- Incorporated (City of Archer): 1850

Government
  - Type: Commission-Manager
  - Mayor: Fletcher J. Hope
  - Vice Mayor: Iris Bailey
  - Commissioners: Marilyn Green, Kathy Penny, and Karen Fiore
  - City Manager: John Martin
  - City Attorney: S. Scott Walker

Area
  - Total: 9.10 sq mi (23.57 km^{2})
  - Land: 9.03 sq mi (23.40 km^{2})
  - Water: 0.066 sq mi (0.17 km^{2})
- Elevation: 92 ft (28 m)

Population (2020)
  - Total: 1,140
  - Density: 126.2/sq mi (48.72/km^{2})
- Time zone: UTC-5 (Eastern (EST))
  - Summer (DST): UTC-4 (EDT)
- ZIP code: 32618
- Area code: 352
- FIPS code: 12-01775
- GNIS feature ID: 2403109
- Website: www.cityofarcher.com

Archer is a city in Alachua County, Florida, United States. It is part of the Gainesville, Florida Metropolitan Statistical Area. As of the 2020 census, the city had a population of 1,140, up from 1,118 at the 2010 census.

== History ==
The City of Archer started in the 1840s as a settler community named both Deer Hammock or Darden's Hammock. Archer was officially incorporated as a municipality in 1850. The first trains stopped in Archer in 1859. The Florida Railroad reached the community in 1858, which shifted the site of the city eastward. At this point the city was renamed Archer, after James T. Archer, the first Florida Secretary of State.

== Geography ==
According to the United States Census Bureau, the city has a total area of 6.9 square miles (18.0 km^{2}), of which 6.9 square miles (17.8 km^{2}) is land and 0.039 square miles (0.1 km^{2}), or 0.60%, is water.

=== Climate ===
The climate in this area is characterized by hot, humid summers and generally mild winters. According to the Köppen climate classification, the City of Archer has a humid subtropical climate zone (Cfa).

== Demographics ==
Historical population
Census	Pop.	Note	%±
1910	468		—
1920	420		−10.3%
1930	576		37.1%
1940	517		−10.2%
1950	586		13.3%
1960	707		20.6%
1970	898		27.0%
1980	1,230		37.0%
1990	1,372		11.5%
2000	1,289		−6.0%
2010	1,118		−13.3%
2020	1,140		2.0%
U.S. Decennial Census

=== Racial and ethnic composition ===
Archer racial composition (Hispanics excluded from racial categories) (NH = Non-Hispanic)
Race	Pop 2010	Pop 2020	% 2010	% 2020
White (NH)	700	581	62.61%	50.96%
Black or African American (NH)	343	390	30.68%	34.21%
Native American or Alaska Native (NH)	4	1	0.36%	0.09%
Asian (NH)	11	4	0.98%	0.35%
Pacific Islander or Native Hawaiian (NH)	0	1	0.00%	0.09%
Some other race (NH)	1	5	0.09%	0.44%
Two or more races/Multiracial (NH)	11	76	0.98%	6.67%
Hispanic or Latino (any race)	48	82	4.29%	7.19%
Total	1,118	1,140		

=== 2020 census ===
As of the 2020 census, Archer had a population of 1,140. The median age was 37.1 years. 26.8% of residents were under the age of 18 and 17.8% of residents were 65 years of age or older. For every 100 females there were 87.2 males, and for every 100 females age 18 and over there were 82.3 males age 18 and over.

0.0% of residents lived in urban areas, while 100.0% lived in rural areas.

There were 460 households in Archer, of which 35.7% had children under the age of 18 living in them. Of all households, 31.7% were married-couple households, 19.1% were households with a male householder and no spouse or partner present, and 43.5% were households with a female householder and no spouse or partner present. About 34.3% of all households were made up of individuals and 15.9% had someone living alone who was 65 years of age or older.

There were 506 housing units, of which 9.1% were vacant. The homeowner vacancy rate was 2.6% and the rental vacancy rate was 2.4%.

According to the United States Census Bureau's 2020 American Community Survey 5-year estimates, there were 229 families residing in the city.

=== 2010 census ===
As of the 2010 United States census, there were 1,118 people, 469 households, and 246 families residing in the city.

=== 2000 census ===
As of the census of 2000, there were 1,289 people, 487 households, and 319 families residing in the city. The population density was 542.6 inhabitants per square mile (209.5/km^{2}). There were 529 housing units at an average density of 222.7 units per square mile (86.0 units/km^{2}). The racial makeup of the city was 60.74% White, 37.63% African American, 0.23% Native American, 0.16% Asian, and 1.24% from two or more races. Hispanic or Latino of any race were 2.25% of the population.

In 2000, there were 487 households, out of which 35.1% had children under the age of 18 living with them, 40.0% were married couples living together, 20.9% had a female householder with no husband present, and 34.3% were non-families. 30.2% of all households were made up of individuals, and 11.7% had someone living alone who was 65 years of age or older. The average household size was 2.65 and the average family size was 3.32.

In 2000, in the city, the population was spread out, with 31.3% under the age of 18, 8.5% from 18 to 24, 25.8% from 25 to 44, 22.8% from 45 to 64, and 11.6% who were 65 years of age or older. The median age was 34 years. For every 100 females, there were 82.8 males. For every 100 females age 18 and over, there were 77.2 males.

In 2000, the median income for a household in the city was $27,875, and the median income for a family was $35,278. Males had a median income of $26,591 versus $21,613 for females. The per capita income for the city was $12,345. About 19.3% of families and 21.6% of the population were below the poverty line, including 30.0% of those under age 18 and 20.0% of those age 65 or over.

== Education ==
Archer is served by the School Board of Alachua County, which operates an elementary school in the city. Students in sixth through eighth grade attend middle school in nearby Newberry. Students in ninth through twelfth grade attend Newberry High School in Newberry.

=== Library ===
The Alachua County Library District operates a branch library in the city.

== Notable people ==
- Bo Diddley, rock & roll legend
- Thomas Gilbert Pearson, a founder of the National Association of Audubon Societies
