= List of county roads in Gilchrist County, Florida =

- County road shields used in Florida

Highway names
- Interstates: Interstate X (I-X)
- US Highways: U.S. Highway X (US X)
- State: State Road X (SR X)
- County: County Road X (CR X)

System links
- County roads in Florida; County roads in Gilchrist County

The following is a list of county roads in Gilchrist County, Florida. All county roads are maintained by the county in which they reside, however not all of them are marked with standard MUTCD approved county road shields.

== List of County Roads in Gilchrist County, Florida ==
#	Road Name(s)	Direction and Termini					Notes
CR 55A	NW 90 Avenue	S/N	CR 55A / SW 100 Street	Levy County line in Fanning Springs	SR 26	Fanning Springs	
CR 138		W/E	US 129 (SR 49)	East-northeast of Wanamake	SR 47	North of Craggs	Former SR 138
CR 232		S/N	SR 26 US 129 (SR 49)	Wilcox South of Bell	US 129 (SR 49) CR 232	North-northeast of Blitchville Alachua County line east-northeast of Waters Lake	Former SR 232
CR 236		W/E	CR 341	West-northwest of Bell	US 129 (SR 49) / NW 20 Street	Bell	Former SR 236
CR 307		S/N	SR 26 / SW 30 Avenue	West of Trenton	US 129 (SR 49)	North-northwest of Trenton	Former SR 307
CR 307A		W/E	CR 307 / SW 80 Street	West-northwest of Trenton	US 129 (SR 49)	Trenton	Former SR 307
CR 313		S/N	SR 26 CR 342	East of Lottieville Southwest of Bell	CR 344 / SW 47 Court CR 236	North of Blitchville West-northwest of Bell	Former SR 313
CR 319	SE Eleventh Street	S/N	CR 319	Levy County line south-southeast of Trenton	SR 26	Trenton	former SR 319
CR 334		W/E	CR 341 / SW 70 Street	North-northwest of Lottieville	CR 307	Northwest of Trenton	Former SR 334
CR 334A		S/N	SR 26 / SW 55 Avenue	Lottieville	CR 334	North of Lottieville	Former SR 334A
CR 337		S/N	SE 110 Street / SE 70 Avenue SR 26 / SE 80 Avenue CR 232	East-southeast of Trenton East-northeast of Trenton East-northeast of Waters Lake	SR 26 CR 232 CR 2095 / NW 298 Street	East-northeast of Trenton East-northeast of Waters Lake Alachua County line east-southeast of Craggs	Former SR 337
CR 339		S/N	CR 339	Levy County line south-southeast of Trenton	US 129 (SR 49)	Trenton	Former SR 339
CR 340		W/E	CR 340	Dixie County line northwest of Bell	CR 2095 / CR 340	Alachua County line northeast of Craggs	Former SR 340
CR 341		S/N	CR 341 SR 26	Levy County line east of Fanning Springs West of Lottieville	SR 26 CR 340	East of Lottieville Northwest of Bell	Former SR 341 and SR 341A
CR 342	Strickland Avenue West	W/E	CR 341 / SW 2 Lane	Southwest of Bell	US 129 (SR 49) / Strickland Avenue	Bell	Former SR 341
CR 344		W/E	Dead end CR 232 / SW 50 Street	Suwannee River south-southwest of Wannee West-northwest of Blitchville	CR 232 / SW 45 Street US 129 (SR 49) / SW 50 Street	Northwest of Blitchville Northeast of Blitchville	Former SR 344
CR 2095		S/N	CR 337 / NW 298 Street	Alachua County line east-southeast of Craggs	CR 340 / CR 340	Alachua County line northeast of Craggs	
