= High Springs—Croom Line =

Atlantic Coast Line Railroad line in Florida

Overview
- Other name(s): Gainesville Subdivision, Ocala Subdivision
- Status: Some segments still operating
- Owner: Atlantic Coast Line Railroad
- Termini: High Springs, Florida; Croom, Florida

Technical
- Line length: 128 mi (206 km)
- Track gauge: 1,435 mm (4 ft 8 1/2 in) standard gauge
- Electrification: No

The Atlantic Coast Line Railroad's High Springs—Croom Line was a historic rail line in northern Florida. The line dates back to the late 1800s and was used for both passengers and freight.

== Route description ==
The High Springs—Croom Line began at the Atlantic Coast Line's High Springs Yard, where it also connected with their DuPont—Lakeland Line. From High Springs, the line proceeded southeast to Gainesville and continued south through Ocala and Leesburg before reconnecting with the DuPont—Lakeland Line in Croom (originally known as Pemberton Ferry).

=== Branches ===
From Croom, the line continued west another ten miles to Brooksville, which was classified separately on employee timetables as the Brooksville Branch.

The High Springs—Croom Line also connected with the Atlantic Coast Line's Palatka Branch just south of Gainesville at Rochelle. The Palatka Branch ran from Rochelle east to Palatka, where it connected with the Atlantic Coast Line's Main Line. The line's Micanopy Branch ran from the line to the small town of Micanopy and Tacoma. Further south, the High Springs—Croom Line also had a small branches to Citra and Howey-in-the-Hills and it also connected with the Leesburg Branch in Leesburg.

== History ==
From High Springs to Gainesville, the line was built by Henry B. Plant in an effort to extend his railroad network further south to Charlotte Harbor. From Gainesville south, the line was built by the Florida Southern Railway. Henry Plant was unaware that the Florida Southern was building north to Gainesville and further north as he was building his line, the Live Oak, Tampa and Charlotte Harbor Railroad, south. To prevent having competing lines, Plant made a mutually beneficial deal with the Florida Southern that essentially combined the two lines into one, connecting them in Gainesville. The Florida Southern also The Florida Southern also built the Palatka Branch during their initial construction, as well as the branches to Micanopy and Citra. The Florida Southern Railway would eventually become part of the Plant System. After Plant's death, his network of railroads was sold to the Atlantic Coast Line Railroad (ACL) in 1902.

Initially, the Atlantic Coast Line used the Palatka Branch to run trains from Jacksonville to the High Springs—Croom Line, which then went south to Ocala and Tampa. This changed in 1905 when the Atlantic Coast Line built a connection with the Jacksonville and Southwestern Railroad (J&SW), which the Atlantic Coast line bought a year prior. The Atlantic Coast Line then used the J&SW line, which crossed the High Springs—Croom Line at Burnett's Lake (just north of Gainesville), for trains from Jacksonville since it was more direct and went through more communities.

The Atlantic Coast Line would sometimes refer to the High Springs—Croom Line as the "Florida Southern Route" (named after the predecessor that built the line) to differentiate it from their nearly parallel High Springs—Lakeland Line which was called the "West Coast Route" and was primarily a freight route.

In 1948, the Atlantic Coast Line rerouted the line in central Gainesville from Main Street to instead run along 6th Street, where they built a new depot. This rerouted segment used the former right of way of the Gainesville and Gulf Railroad.

For much of its history, the Atlantic Coast Line's West Coast Champion and an additional local passenger train ran the line round-trip daily on its route from Jacksonville to St. Petersburg. Trains continued to come in from Jacksonville via the Jacksonville—Wilcox Line at Burnett's Lake. By the 1950s, a local freight train was running the line from High Springs to Croom six days a week. A mixed train (with both passengers and freight) also ran the line from Burnett's Lake to High Springs six days a week.

In 1967, the Atlantic Coast Line became the Seaboard Coast Line Railroad (SCL) after merging with its rival, the Seaboard Air Line Railroad (whose main line ran relatively close to the High Springs—Croom Line). In the Seaboard Coast Line era, both the High Springs—Croom Line and the Jacksonville—Wilcox Line were designated as the Ocala Subdivision. A local passenger train would continue to use the line up until 1971 when Amtrak took over the Seaboard Coast Line's passenger operations.

By 1982, the Seaboard Coast Line abandoned the line from High Springs to Burnett's Lake, and track south of Micanopy Junction was broken up into segments. By 1989, track was abandoned from Gainesville to Rochelle (along with the Palatka Branch east to Hawthorne).

== Current conditions ==
Some segments of the High Springs—Croom Line remain active today and some abandoned segments have since become rail trails.

=== Deerhaven Subdivision ===
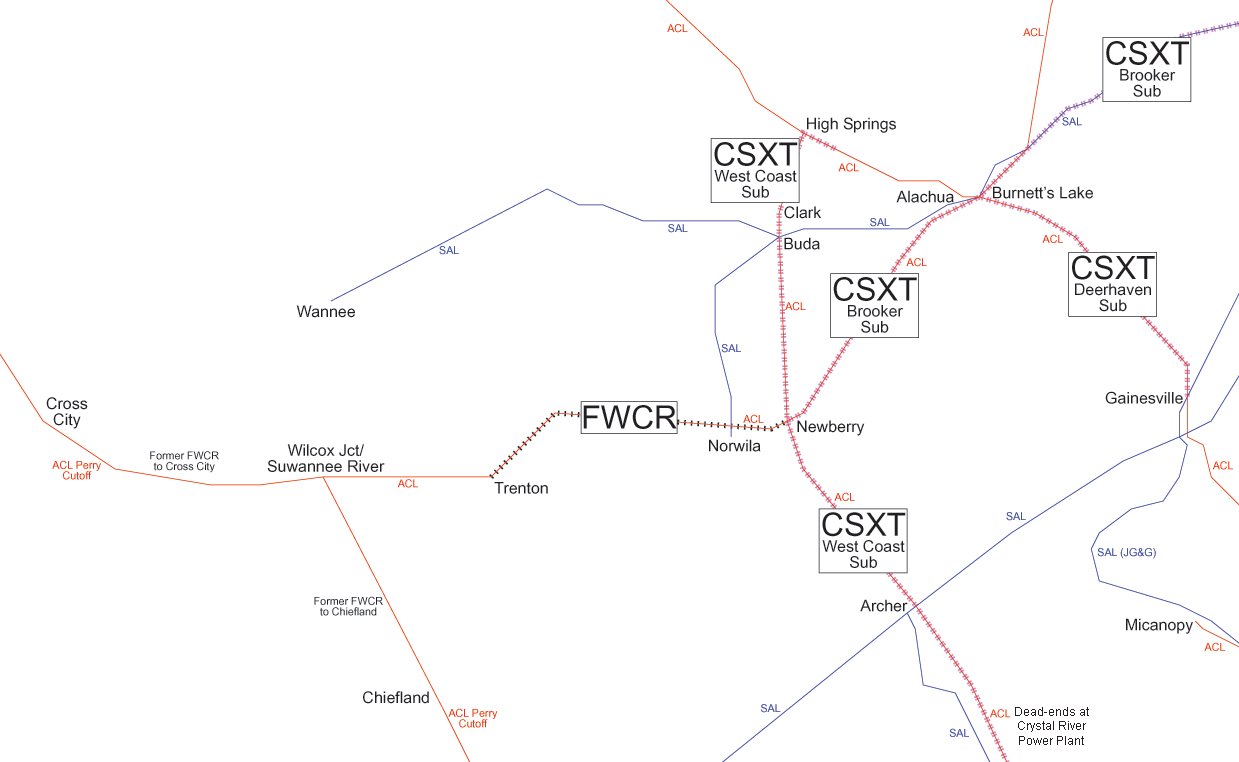
Scale map of Deerhaven Subdivision with historic rail lines.

The short 13-mile segment of the line is still in service from Burnett's Lake south to Gainesville, where it terminates just north of central Gainesville at NE 23rd Avenue. This line is now CSX's Deerhaven Subdivision and it is the only remaining rail line in Gainesville. CSX uses the line for local freight and it is connected to the rest of CSX's network via the Brooker Subdivision at Burnett's Lake.

=== South of Gainesville ===
The Gainesville-Hawthorne State Trail runs on the former right of way between Gainesville and Rochelle.

The line is still active between Lowell, Ocala, and Candler. This segment is operated by the Florida Northern Railroad, a shortline run by Regional Rail, LLC, which crosses the S Line in Ocala.

A short segment was still active near Leesburg which had been operated by the Florida Midland Railroad since 1987 (this line also used former Seaboard track from Wildwood to Leesburg). This line was abandoned in late 2000.

The Lake County Parks Department is proposing two rail-trails along the former right-of-way. One would run south of Leesburg through Okahumpka, and the other would run north of Leesburg into Fruitland Park.

The Good Neighbor Trail runs on the former right of way between Croom and Brooksville.

== Historic stations ==
High Springs to Brooksville
Milepost	City/Location	Station	Image	Connections and notes
ARB 717.1	High Springs	High Springs		junction with DuPont—Lakeland Line (ACL)
ARB 724.7	Alachua	East Alachua		
ARB 726.4	Alachua	Burnett's Lake		junction with: Jacksonville—Wilcox Line (ACL); Atlantic, Suwannee River and Gulf Railway (SAL)
ARB 729.7	Hague	Hague		
ARB 736.0	Gainesville	Paradise		Annexed by Gainesville
ARB 739.0	Gainesville	Teen Jay		Annexed by Gainesville
ARB 740.1	Gainesville	Gainesville		original station on Main Street replaced with a new station on 6th Street in 1948. junction with: Seaboard Air Line Railroad Brooksville Subdivision; Gainesville and Gulf Railroad (SAL)
ARB 749.5; AS 737.5 (Note: From Rochelle south, the milepost numbers continue from the Palatka Branch)	Rochelle	Rochelle		junction with Palatka Branch
AS 743.1	Grove Park WMA	Micanopy Junction		junction with Micanopy Branch
AS 745.7	Evinston	Evinston		
AS 748.6	McIntosh	McIntosh		
AS 750.2	Orange Lake	Orange Lake		
AS 751.1	Proctor	Proctor		junction with Citra Branch
ASB 757.2	Citra	Citra		located on Citra Branch
AS 753.7	Reddick	Reddick		
AS 756.9	Lowell	Lowell		
AS 760.0	Martin	Martin		
AS 763.5	Kendrick	Kendrick		
AS 768.3	Ocala	Ocala Union Station		junction with Seaboard Air Line Railroad Main Line
AS 774.9	Welchton	Welchton		
AS 781.2	Candler	Candler		
AS 785.2	Ocklawaha	Ocklawaha		
AS 787.7	East Lake Weir	East Lake		
AS 790.2	Weirsdale	Weirsdale		
AS 793.7	Conant	Conant		
AS 795.0	Lady Lake	Lady Lake		
AS 799.1	Fruitland Park	Fruitland Park		
AS 802.7	Leesburg	Leesburg		junction with: Leesburg Branch; Seaboard Air Line Railroad Orlando Subdivision
AS 808.3	Okahumpka	Okahumpka		junction with Howey-in-the-Hills Branch
AS 816.9	Center Hill	Center Hill		junction with Seaboard Air Line Railroad Miami Subdivision
AS 821.5	Webster	Webster		
AS 826.6	St. Catherine	St. Catherine		junction with Seaboard Air Line Railroad Main Line
AS 833.1	Croom	Croom		Previously known as Pemberton Ferry junction with DuPont—Lakeland Line
AS 843.1	Brooksville	Brooksville		station still standing and is now a museum junction with Tampa Northern Railroad (SAL)

Palatka Branch
Milepost	City/Location	Station	Image	Connections and notes
AS 698.6	Palatka	Palatka		rebuilt in 1908 junction with: Atlantic Coast Line Railroad Main Line; Florida East Coast Railway Palatka Branch; Georgia Southern and Florida Railway (SOU); Ocklawaha Valley Railroad
AS 703.0		Francis		
AS 710.5	Hollister	Hollister		
AS 715.8	Interlachen	Interlachen		
AS 719.9	Edgar	Edgar		
AS 728.7	Hawthorne	Hawthorne		junction with Seaboard Air Line Railroad Main Line
AS 733.3	Grove Park	Grove Park		
AS 737.5	Rochelle	Rochelle		junction with High Springs—Croom Line

Micanopy Branch
Milepost	City/Location	Station	Image	Connections and notes
ASA 743.1		Micanopy Junction		junction with High Springs—Croom Line
ASA 746.5	Micanopy	Micanopy		
ASA 751.5	Tacoma	Tacoma		

Howey-in-the-Hills Branch
Milepost	City/Location	Station	Image	Connections and notes
AS 808.3	Okahumpka	Okahumpka		junction with High Springs—Croom Line
	Yalaha	Yahala		
ASF 816.2	Howey-in-the-Hills	Howey-in-the-Hills		located on Howey-in-the-Hills Branch

== See also ==
- Main Line (Atlantic Coast Line Railroad)
- DuPont—Lakeland Line
