= Williford, Florida =

Williford was a siding of the Seaboard Air Line Railroad's Wannee Subdivision in Gilchrist County, Florida, United States. It was located approximately 5 miles (8.0 km) northeast of Bell, and 2 miles (3.2 km) west of Craggs.

The main road through Williford is Gilchrist County Road 340. It was also passed through by the Atlantic, Suwannee River and Gulf Railway, which was later acquired by the Seaboard Air Line Railroad, who designated it as their Wannee Subdivision, and had a station within the community, After SAL was merged with the Atlantic Coast Line Railroad in 1967, the railroad line became a spur of the West End Subdivision, and was abandoned by CSX during the 1980s.

== Geography ==
It is located at 29.786°N 82.792°W, its elevation 72 feet (22 m).
