= Atlantic, Suwannee River and Gulf Railway =

Historic railroad in Florida

Overview
- Locale: Florida
- Dates of operation: 1891–1903
- Successor: Seaboard Air Line Railroad

Technical
- Track gauge: 4 ft 8 1/2 in (1,435 mm) standard gauge

The Atlantic, Suwannee River and Gulf Railroad Company was a railroad that ran westward from Starke, Florida, eventually terminating at Wannee, Florida, on the Suwannee River. It was later absorbed by the Seaboard Air Line Railroad becoming their Wannee Subdivision.

== Route description ==
The Atlantic, Suwannee River and Gulf Railway began in Starke at Wannee Junction, a junction with the Florida Central and Peninsular Railroad (which later became the Seaboard Air Line Railroad's main line). From Starke, the line ran west to Sampson City, where it crossed the Georgia Southern and Florida Railway. Beyond Sampson City, the Atlantic, Suwannee River and Gulf Railway continued west through Brooker, La Crosse, and Hainesworth. In Hainesworth, it crossed the Jacksonville and Southwestern Railroad.

From Hainesworth, the Atlantic, Suwannee River and Gulf Railway then paralleled the Jacksonville and Southwestern Railroad west four miles to Alachua. Beyond Alachua, the Atlantic, Suwannee River and Gulf Railway continued west to Buda where it crossed a branch of the Live Oak, Tampa and Charlotte Harbor Railroad (which later became the Atlantic Coast Line Railroad's DuPont—Lakeland Line).

Beyond Buda, it ran southwest to Bell before coming to its terminus at Wannee on the Suwannee River.

== History ==
=== Construction and early years ===
The Starke to Wannee rail line was initiated in 1891 with the incorporation of the Starke and Sampson City Railway Company. The company failed after grading the right-of-way from Starke to Sampson City, and in 1892 transferred the right-of-way to the Ambler Lumber Co. (Note: Pettengill has "Simpson City" throughout, which appears to be a misprint for "Sampson City". Prince lists Sampson City as the first station on the line west of Starke. Sampson City was the northern terminal point for the Gainesville and Gulf Railroad, and was also served by the Georgia Southern and Florida Railroad.)

The Atlantic, Suwannee River and Gulf Railroad (ASR&G) was incorporated under the general incorporation laws of Florida in 1893. Shortly after incorporation, the company purchased the graded right-of-way between Starke and Sampson City from the Ambler Lumber Company and contracted with the Atlantic Lumber Company (successor to the Ambler Lumber Company) to lay the track. The track from Starke reached Sampson City in August, 1863, and LaCrosse in March, 1894. After a pause, The track reached Alachua in July, 1896, and Buda, between High Springs and Newberry, in July, 1897. The Florida Central and Peninsular Railroad (FC&PR) leased the ASR&G in 1899, and contracted with the Atlantic Lumber Company to extend the line to Wannee, a distance of 22 miles (35 km). With completion of the Wannee extension in 1902 the line was 57 miles (92 km) long. The completed line was standard gauge and single-track.

The ASR&GR under FC&PR control operated the line from Starke to Buda, and the Atlantic Lumber Company operated the line from Buda to Wannee. From its founding, the ASR&GR had served primarily to feed timber and lumber to the FC&PR.

=== Seaboard Air Line Railroad ===
Wannee Subdivision

Overview
- Owner: Seaboard Air Line Railroad
- Termini: Starke, Florida; Wannee, Florida

Technical
- Track gauge: 1,435 mm (4 ft 8 1/2 in) standard gauge
- Electrification: No

The Florida Central and Peninsular Railroad was acquired by the Seaboard Air Line Railroad (SAL) in the early 1900s. Operation of both the FC&PR and the ASR&GR was taken over by the Seaboard Air Line Railroad in July, 1900, and both were formally adsorbed by the SAL in June, 1903. The Seaboard Air Line would eventually designate the line as the Wannee Subdivision. For much of its history, the Seaboard Air Line would operate mixed train service (with both passengers and freight) on the Wannee Subdivision. After taking over the line, Seaboard built a spur from the line at Buda south to Norwills, which was located just west of Newberry.

The Seaboard Air Line removed the track between Wannee and Bell in the 1930s. Despite the removal of track from Wannee, the line was still known as the Wannee Subdivision.

=== Mergers and consolidation ===
Much of the line west of Brooker was abandoned after the Seaboard Air Line merged with its competitor, the Atlantic Coast Line Railroad, in 1967. The track from Buda to Bell would remain as a spur of the West Coast Subdivision (an ex-ACL line) until the 1980s.

The Seaboard Coast Line became CSX Transportation in the 1980s. In the 1990s, CSX rebuilt a short segment of the Atlantic, Suwannee River and Gulf Railway to Hainesworth to reconnect with the remains of the former Jacksonville and Southwestern Railroad, which had just been severed from its system. This segment is now CSX Transportation's Brooker Subdivision and is still in service. The line's connection with the CSX S Line is still known as Wannee Junction.

== Historic stations ==
Starke to Wannee
Milepost (Note: The Seaboard Air Line assigned the prefix N to the milepost numbers on its line from Starke to Wannee when it took over the line. After the merger of the Seaboard Air Line with the Atlantic Coast Line in 1967, S was added to the beginning of all Seaboard Air Line milepost prefixes to differentiate them from the Atlantic Coast Line's routes. This made the prefix SN as it is today.)	City/Location	Station	Connections and notes
SN 679.0	Starke	Wannee Junction	junction with Florida Central and Peninsular Railroad Southern Division (SAL)
SN 685.6	Sampson City	Sampson City	junction with: Georgia Southern and Florida Railway (SOU); Gainesville and Gulf Railroad (SAL)
		Wainright's	
SN 689.5		Clayno	
		Atlantic	
SN 693.7	Brooker	Brooker	
SN 696.0		Darby	
SN 699.0	La Crosse	La Crosse	
		Getzens	
SN 702.3		Hainesworth	junction with Jacksonville and Southwestern Railroad (ACL)
	Alachua	Burnett's Lake	junction with Live Oak, Tampa and Charlotte Harbor Railroad (ACL)
SN 706.5	Alachua	Alachua	
	Alachua	Hodges	
SN 711.9		Arno	
SN 715.2		Buda	junction with: Buda Spur; Live Oak, Tampa and Charlotte Harbor Railroad (ACL)
SN 720.3	Neals	Neals	
SN 725.5	Williford	Williford	
		Harvard	
SN 730.3	Bell	Bell	
SN 733.2	Curtis	Curtis	
SN 735.7	Wannee	Wannee	

Buda Spur (Note: Built by the Seaboard Air Line)
Milepost	City/Location	Station	Connections and notes
(S)NA 715.2		Buda	junction with main line
(S)NA 717.2		Mutual	
(S)NAB 722.3		Thames	located on a spur
(S)NA 720.8		Vanespen	
(S)NA 723.6		Fleetnor	
(S)NA 724.1		Camp Mines	
(S)NA 724.7		Norwills	

== Sources ==
- Interstate Commerce Commission (April–May 1932). Decisions of the Interstate Commerce Commission of the United States. Interstate Commerce Commission Reports. Vol. 35, Valuation Reports. Washington, D.C.: United States Government Printing Office. pp. 558–562.
- Mulligan, M. (2008). Railroad Depots of Central Florida. Images of rail. Arcadia Pub. p. 63. ISBN 978-0-7385-5390-0.
- Pettengill, George W. Jr. (July 1952). "The Story of the Florida Railroads". Railway and Locomotive Historical Society Bulletin. 86. Boston, Mass.: Railway and Locomotive Historical Society: 1–133. JSTOR 43517668.
- Prince, R.E. (1969). Seaboard Air Line Railway: Steam Boats, Locomotives, and History. Steam Boats, Locomotives, and History Series. Indiana University Press. p. 79. ISBN 978-0-253-33695-8. "The ATLANTIC, SUWANNEE RIVER & GULF RY began construction in 1893 and passed westward through Sampson City, Burnetts Lake, and Alachua, to be completed 36 miles as far as Buda in 1897. On September 14, 1899 the company ..."
- Turner, Gregg (2003). A Short History of Florida Railroads. Arcadia Publishing. ISBN 978-0-7385-2421-4.
- Turner, Gregg M. (2008). A Journey into Florida Railroad History. University Press of Florida. ISBN 978-0-8130-4194-0. OCLC 960180796.
- Watkins, Caroline (1975). "Some Early Railroads in Alachua County". The Florida Historical Quarterly. 53 (4): 450–459. ISSN 0015-4113. JSTOR 30150300.
