= National Register of Historic Places listings in Gilchrist County, Florida =

Location of Gilchist County in Florida

This is a list of the National Register of Historic Places listings in Gilchrist County, Florida.

This is intended to be a complete list of the properties on the National Register of Historic Places in Gilchrist County, Florida, United States. The locations of National Register properties for which the latitude and longitude coordinates are included below, may be seen in a map.

There are two properties listed on the National Register in the county.

This National Park Service list is complete through NPS recent listings posted March 21, 2025.

Contents: Counties in Florida (non-linked contain no National Register listings)
Alachua - Baker - Bay - Bradford - Brevard - Broward - Calhoun - Charlotte - Citrus - Clay - Collier - Columbia - DeSoto - Dixie - Duval - Escambia - Flagler - Franklin - Gadsden - Gilchrist - Glades - Gulf - Hamilton - Hardee - Hendry - Hernando - Highlands - Hillsborough (Tampa) - Holmes - Indian River - Jackson - Jefferson - Lafayette - Lake - Lee - Leon - Levy - Liberty - Madison - Manatee - Marion - Martin - Miami-Dade (Miami) - Monroe - Nassau - Okaloosa - Okeechobee - Orange - Osceola - Palm Beach - Pasco - Pinellas - Polk - Putnam - St. Johns - St. Lucie - Santa Rosa - Sarasota - Seminole - Sumter - Suwannee - Taylor - Union - Volusia - Wakulla - Walton - Washington

== Current listing ==
	Name on the Register	Image	Date listed	Location	City or town	Description
1	Cannon Farm	Cannon Farm	October 30, 2013 (#13000851)	5470 NW. 37th Ct. 29°49′03″N 82°52′16″W	Bell	
2	Gilchrist County Jail	Gilchrist County Jail	January 22, 2024 (#100009786)	313 NW Second Street; 29°36′54″N 82°49′14″W	Trenton	

== See also ==
- List of National Historic Landmarks in Florida
- National Register of Historic Places listings in Florida
