= County Road 138 =

County Road 138 or County Route 138 may refer to:

- County Road 138 (Columbia County, Florida), formerly State Road 138
- County Road 138 (Gilchrist County, Florida), also formerly State Road 138
- County Road 138 (Pinellas County, Florida), locally known as Gulfport Boulevard and 22nd Avenue South
- County Route 138 (Herkimer County, New York)
- County Route 138 (Niagara County, New York)
- County Route 138 (Onondaga County, New York)
