= Brooker Subdivision =

Railway line in Florida

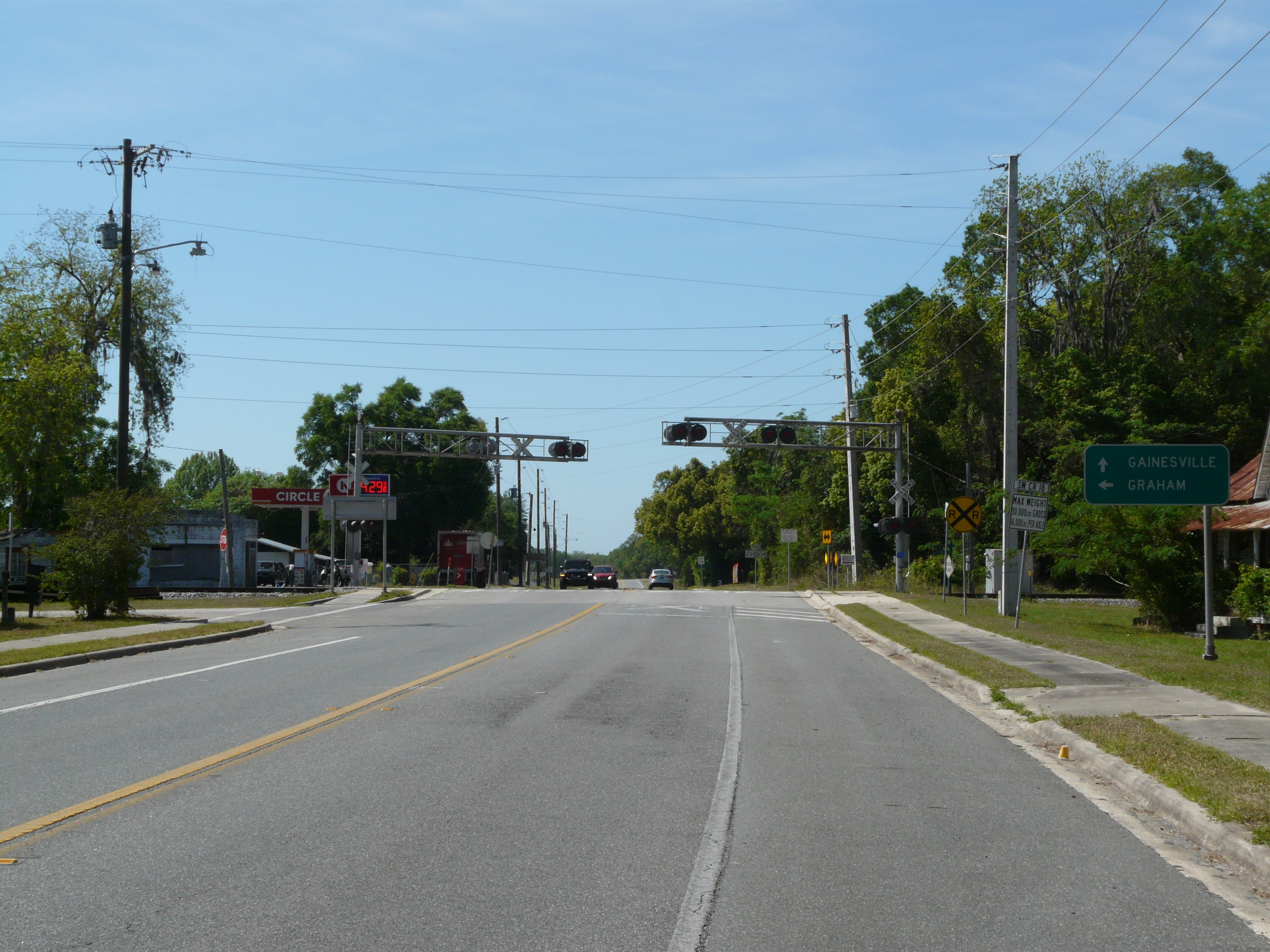
Railroad crossing in Brooker, Florida

The Brooker Subdivision is a railroad line owned by CSX Transportation in Florida. The line runs from the CSX S Line (the Wildwood Subdivision) at Wannee Junction in Starke to Newberry for a total of 39.6 miles.

== Route description ==
The Brooker Subdivision begins at Wannee Junction in Starke where it connects to CSX's S Line (Wildwood Subdivision). From here, it heads southwest through Sampson City, Brooker, LaCrosse. In Alachua, it connects with CSX's Deerhaven Subdivision which runs south to Gainesville. From Alachua, the Brooker Subdivision continues southwest to its terminus at Newberry, Florida, where it connects with the Florida Northern Railroad.

== Operation ==
The Brooker Subdivision is primarily used by CSX to interchange with the Florida Northern Railroad in Newberry, Florida. It is also used for local freight, as well as providing access to the Deerhaven Subdivision, CSX's only remaining line to Gainesville.

== History ==
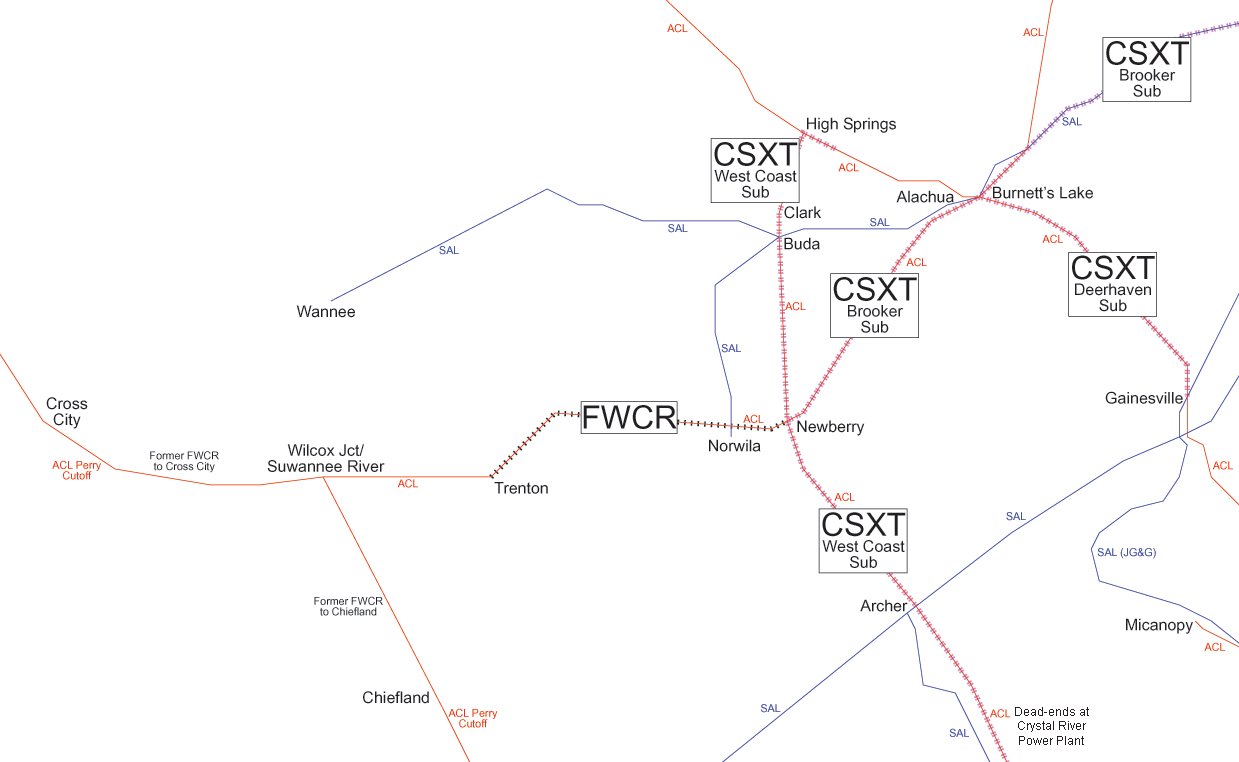
Scale map of Brooker Subdivision with historic rail lines.

The Brooker Subdivision from Starke to Hainesworth (just west of LaCrosse) was originally built from 1863 to 1894 by the Atlantic, Suwannee River and Gulf Railway, which would eventually run in its entirety from Starke east to Wannee (which is why the junction with the Wildwood Subdivision is still known as Wannee Junction). The Atlantic, Suwannee River and Gulf Railway was leased by the Florida Central and Peninsular Railroad in 1899, which would in turn be bought by the Seaboard Air Line Railroad a year later. The Seaboard would designate this line as the Wannee Subdivision.

From Hainesworth to Newberry, the line was originally part of the Jacksonville and Southwestern Railroad which was built in 1899. The Jacksonville and Southwestern Railroad, which originated in Jacksonville and ran through Baldwin was bought by the Atlantic Coast Line Railroad in 1904.

The Atlantic Coast Line and Seaboard Air Line Railroads merged in 1967 which brought all of the trackage under a single owner, the Seaboard Coast Line Railroad, which would become CSX Transportation in the 1980s. In the early 1970s, the Wannee Subdivision from Brooker to Hainesworth was abandoned along with much of the original Atlantic, Suwannee River and Gulf Railway. Trains could still access Gainesville and Newberry via the former Jacksonville and Southwestern Railroad from Mattox. When that line was abandoned north of Hainesworth, track from there to Brooker was rebuilt and was designated as the Brooker Subdivision. The former Atlantic Coast Line segments mileposts were also renumbered to match the Seaboard segments (SN prefix), which is unusual for CSX lines. The previous mileposts on this segment had an ASG prefix.

== See also ==
- List of CSX Transportation lines
