= Jacksonville and Southwestern Railroad =

Historic railroad in Florida

- Interactive map of the Jacksonville & Southwestern Railroad (red). The ACL-built extension to Wilcox is also shown (dark red).

Overview
- Reporting mark: J&SW
- Locale: Jacksonville, Florida; Newberry, Florida
- Dates of operation: 1899–1904
- Successor: Atlantic Coast Line Railroad; Seaboard Coast Line Railroad

Technical
- Track gauge: 4 ft 8 1/2 in (1,435 mm) standard gauge

The Jacksonville & Southwestern Railroad (J&SW) was a railroad that served Florida from 1899 to 1904. It was purchased by the Atlantic Coast Line Railroad in 1904. The Atlantic Coast Line would extend the line further west and it would become their Jacksonville—Wilcox Line. Some of the original right-of-way was converted to a recreational path in the rails to trails program in the 1990s.

== History ==
=== Construction and Early Years ===
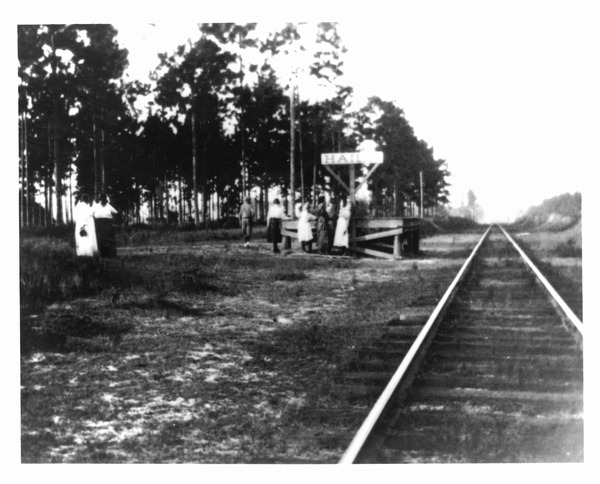
Station in Haile

The railroad was built by Wellington W. Cummer from his sawmill at Milldale, on the St. Johns River north of the then city limits of Jacksonville, Florida, to access timber lands near Newberry, Florida. Chartered on March 11, 1899, by November 1899 it was complete to Lake Butler, where connection was made with the Georgia Southern & Florida Railway (GS&F), and the terminus of Newberry was reached a month later. The company was closely held by the Cummer family at first: The original officers were W. W. Cummer of Jacksonville, President; Jacob Cummer, of Cadillac, Michigan, Vice-President; Arthur G. Cummer, Treasurer; and Waldo E. Cummer, Secretary. General manager of construction was George L. Davis. An agreement with the new Atlantic, Valdosta & Western Railway (AV&W) allowed the use of their line from the junction at Grand Crossing near the Jacksonville city limits to a station adjacent to the AV&W depot at Catherine and East Bay streets. Excursions were run for Jacksonville's Gala Week in November, regular daily service began a month later. By then the president was James M. Barnett of Grand Rapids; Jacob Cummer as First Vice-President; W. W. Cummer Second Vice-President; Harvey Hollister of Grand Rapids, Michigan, Treasurer; Arthur G. Cummer, Secretary. Waldo E. Cummer was named Superintendent, and George L. Davis remained as Superintendent of construction.

The road operated a round trip daily, leaving Newberry around 6 a.m. and arriving in Jacksonville four and a half hours later; the return left around 5 p.m. for a late evening arrival in Newberry. A close connection was made with GS&F trains at Lake Butler and package cars ran through via Lake Butler to Lake City and Gainesville. The J&SW had many connections: In addition to the AV&W and the GS&F, it connected with the Florida Central & Peninsular Railroad at Jacksonville, Baldwin and Deep Creek Junction; the Plant System's Savannah, Florida & Western Railway at Grand Crossing; and the Atlantic, Suwannee River & Gulf Railway at Hainesworth.

The J&SW was built primarily to serve the Cummer mills, and though it crossed some valuable phosphate lands, the Cummers did little to develop that traffic. On July 1, 1903, C. W. Chase, President of the H. F. Dutton & Co., a Gainesville-based phosphate mining company, bought the J&SW and became its president. E. S. Spencer, the road's traffic manager, was named general manager. Within a month Chase announced that construction was to begin on a large phosphate port at Milldale. The road was extended a few miles west of Newberry to reach the Dutton mine.

=== Atlantic Coast Line ownership ===
Jacksonville—Wilcox Line

Overview
- Status: Some segments are still operating
- Owner: Atlantic Coast Line Railroad

Technical
- Track gauge: 1,435 mm (4 ft 8 1/2 in) standard gauge
- Electrification: No

The Atlantic Coast Line (ACL) expressed interest in the J&SW, and bought the railroad outright as soon as the Florida Railroad Commission approved the purchase on July 28, 1904. The daily train continued to use the Catherine Street station for several months before being switched over to the Jacksonville Union Terminal on West Bay Street. The ACL extended the line west to Wilcox in 1907 and beyond to Cross City and Perry by 1909, where it would eventually connect with ACL's historic Perry Cutoff. By then, the line was designated at the Jacksonville–Wilcox Line (SG Line).

Eventually, the line became the main route for the Atlantic Coast Line's passenger trains running from Jacksonville to St. Petersburg. By 1949, the West Coast Champion and a local passenger train were running the line daily between Jacksonville and Burnett's Lake, where they turned south to St. Petersburg. At the same time, mixed train service (consisting of both passengers and freight) ran six days a week from Burnett's Lake to Newberry and Wilcox.

=== Later years ===
In 1967, the Atlantic Coast Line merged with its rival, the Seaboard Air Line Railroad. The merged company was named the Seaboard Coast Line Railroad. After the merger, a daily local passenger train and a local freight train that ran six days a week were still using the line. However, passenger service ended on May 1, 1971, with the advent of Amtrak.

By 1972, the line was abandoned between Mattox and a point just west of Grand Crossing in Jacksonville. The line from Mattox south to Hainesworth remained until the mid to late 1980s and operated as Seaboard Coast Line Railroad's Ocala, Gainesville, and Wilcox Subdivisions.

== Current conditions ==
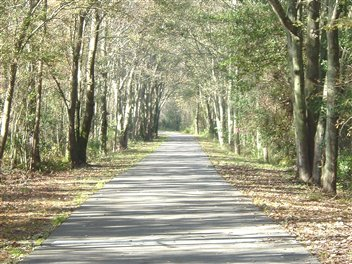
Jacksonville-Baldwin Rail Trail on the former right of way

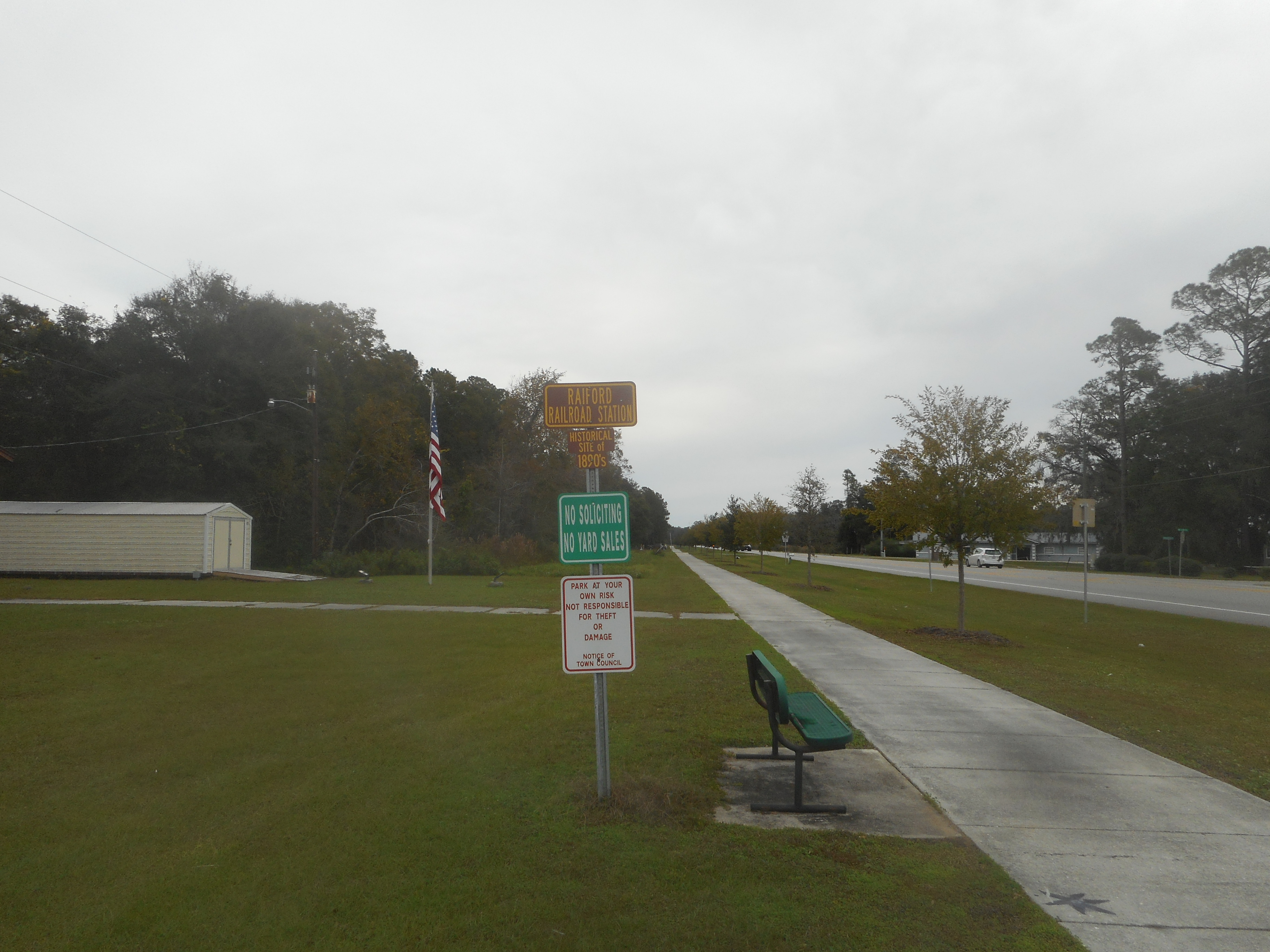
Another rail trail on the former right of way in Raiford.

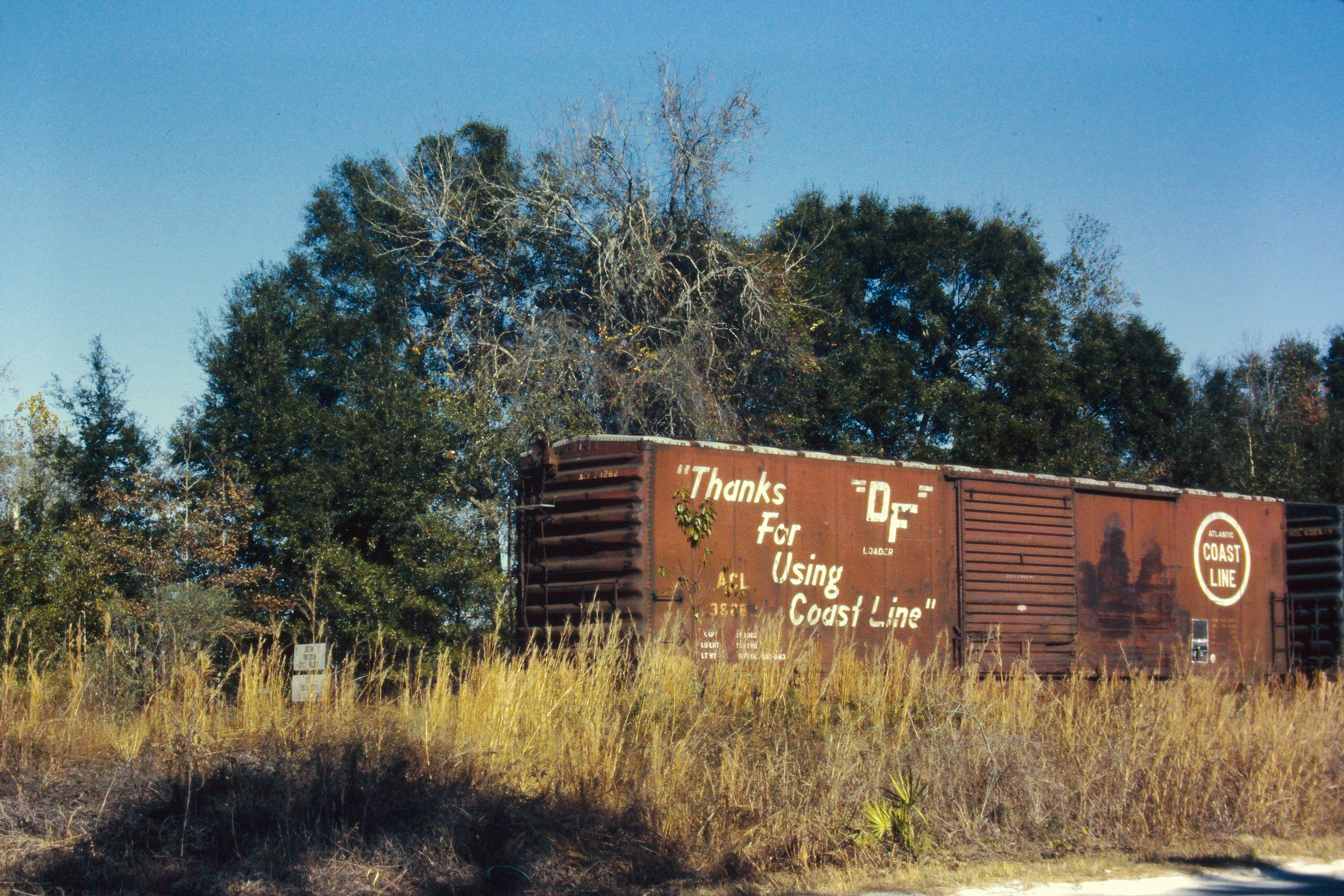
Boxcar on the extension to the Perry Cutoff in Wilcox in 1987.

Parts of the line are still active and are operated by CSX Transportation. Track from just west of Jacksonville near Duval Yard east to Panama Park is still in service. This track from Grand Crossing to Panama Park is now part of CSX's Kingsland Subdivision. At the other end, track from Hainesworth to Newberry is now part of CSX's Brooker Subdivision.

In 1993, CSX sold 14 miles of the unused right of way between Imeson Road (about three miles west of Grand Crossing) and County Road 121 near Baldwin to the Florida Department of Natural Resources to become the Jacksonville-Baldwin Rail Trail.

== Historic stations ==
| Original Milepost | System Milepost | City/Location | Station | Connections and notes |
|---|---|---|---|---|
| 0.0 | ASJ 644.8 | Jacksonville | Milldale | junction with Florida Central and Peninsular Railroad Northern Division (SAL) |
| 4.8 | A 640.0 | Jacksonville | Grand Crossing | junction with: East Florida Railway (ACL); Atlantic, Valdosta and Western Railway (GSF/SOU) |
| | A 642.8 | Jacksonville | Jacksonville | Located on a spur parallel to Atlantic, Valdosta and Western Railway. Service later relocated to Jacksonville Union Terminal. |
| 10.5 | ASG 645.3 | Jacksonville | Cambon | |
| 20.4 | ASG 655.2 | Baldwin | Baldwin | junction with Florida Central and Peninsular Railroad Southern Division (SAL) |
| 25.0 | ASG 659.8 | | Mattox | junction with Florida Central and Peninsular Railroad Western Division (SAL) |
| 28.0 | ASG 662.8 | | McPherson | |
| 30.0 | ASG 664.8 | | Griffing | |
| 38.0 | ASG 672.8 | | Cummer | |
| 42.0 | ASG 676.8 | | Britt | |
| | | Raiford | Bradford Farms Junction | junction with Bradford Farms Railroad, a prison railroad spur |
| 46.0 | ASG 681.0 | Raiford | Raiford | |
| 48.0 | ASG 683.0 | | Stewarts | |
| 50.4 | ASG 685.4 | | Varnes | |
| 54.0 | ASG 688.8 | Lake Butler | Lake Butler | junction with Georgia Southern & Florida Railway (SOU) |
| 59.5 | ASG 693.5 | Dukes | Dukes | |
| 62.2 | ASG 696.2 | Worthington | Worthington | |
| 65.0 | ASG 700.0 | | Santa Fe | |
| 69.5 | ASG 704.5 | Hainesworth | Hainesworth | originally spelled Haynesworth junction with Atlantic, Suwannee River and Gulf Railway (SAL) |
| 72.0 | ASG 707.6 | Alachua | Burnett's Lake | junction with Live Oak, Tampa and Charlotte Harbor Railroad (ACL) |
| 74.0 | ASG 708.8 | Alachua | Alachua | |
| 78.5 | ASG 713.3 | Cadillac | Cadillac | |
| 80.0 | ASG 717.3 | Haile | Haile | |
| 84.8 | ASG 719.1 | | Komoka | |
| 86.3 | ASG 720.6 | Newberry | Newberry | junction with Live Oak, Tampa and Charlotte Harbor Railroad (ACL) |
Western Extension (built by ACL)
| | | Newberry | Barrs Crossing | |
| | | Tyler | Tyler | |
| | ASG 734.1 | Trenton | Trenton | |
| | | Lottieville | Lottieville | |
| | ASG 741.9 | Wilcox | Wilcox | |
For stations west of Wilcox, see Perry Cutoff
