= Bell Middle/High School (Florida) =

Coordinates: 29.7518°N 82.8595°W

Bell Florida Middle/High School
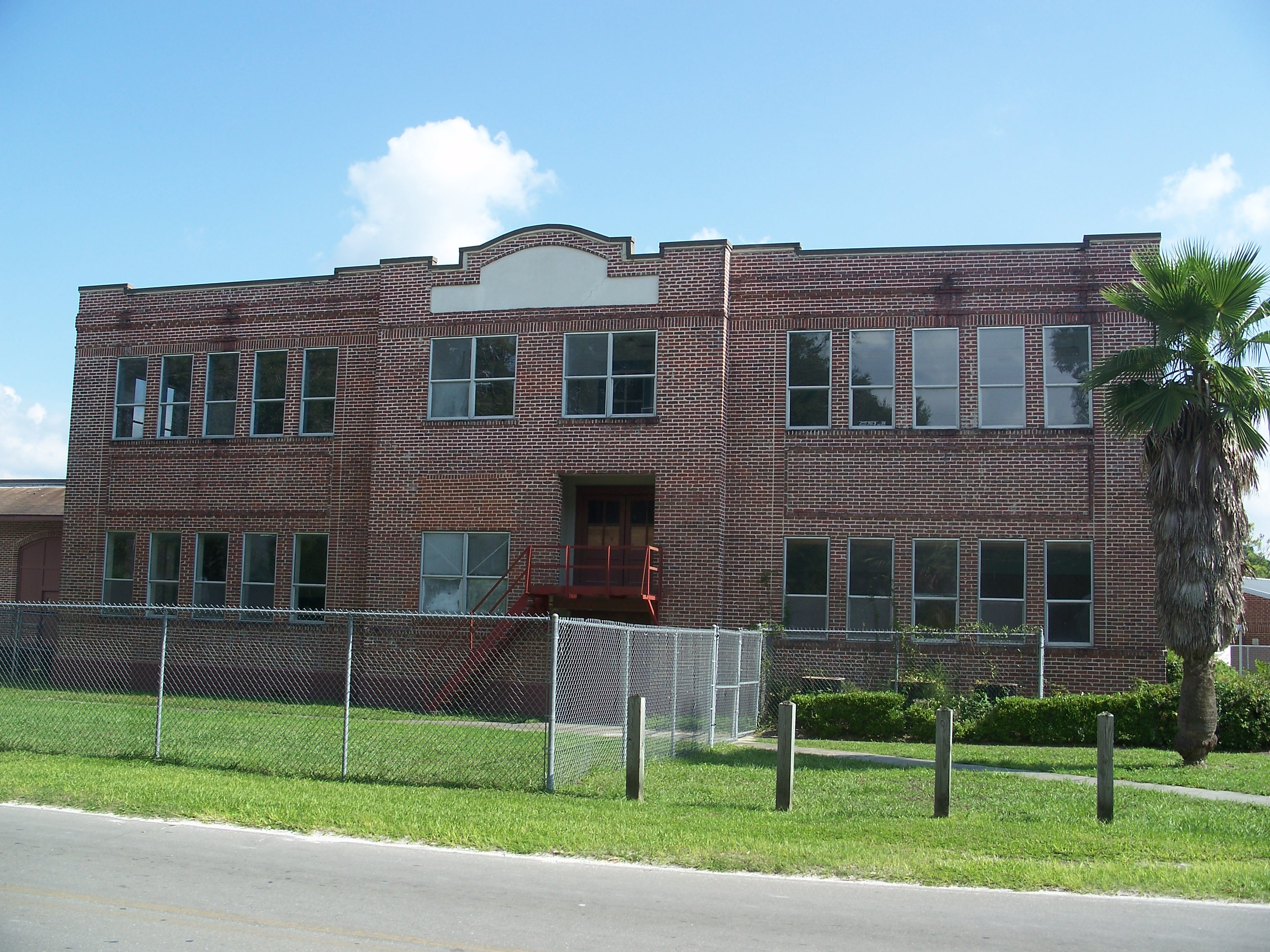

Location
- 930 South Main Street; Bell, Gilchrist County, Florida 32619; United States

Information
- Motto: School growth is not an option, it is an expectation.
- School district: Gilchrist County School District
- Superintendent: Gina Geiger
- Principal: Scott Lemaster =
- Teaching staff: 38.00 (FTE)
- Grades: 6-12
- Enrollment: 696 (2024–2025)
- Student to teacher ratio: 18.32
- Colors: Purple and Gold
- Fight song: Let's go Bulldogs!
- Mascot: Bulldogs
- Team name: Bell Bulldogs
- Rival: Trenton Tigers
- USNWR ranking: Top 100 in Florida
- National ranking: A
- Yearbook: Bell Middle/High school yearbook
- Website: https://www.gilchristschools.org/o/bhs

Bell Middle/High School is a school in Bell, Florida. It serves more than 700 students spread out in grades 6 through 12. Its mascot is the bulldog, previously the bullfrog. It is part of the Gilchrist Country School District. The school has earned an A grade since Year 5 with 2024 still pending, and has been rated as one of the top 1 combination middle/high schools in the state of Florida.

== Administration ==
- Principal: Dr. Scott Lemaster
- Vice Principal: Ms. Dana Rudzitis

== Clubs and activities ==
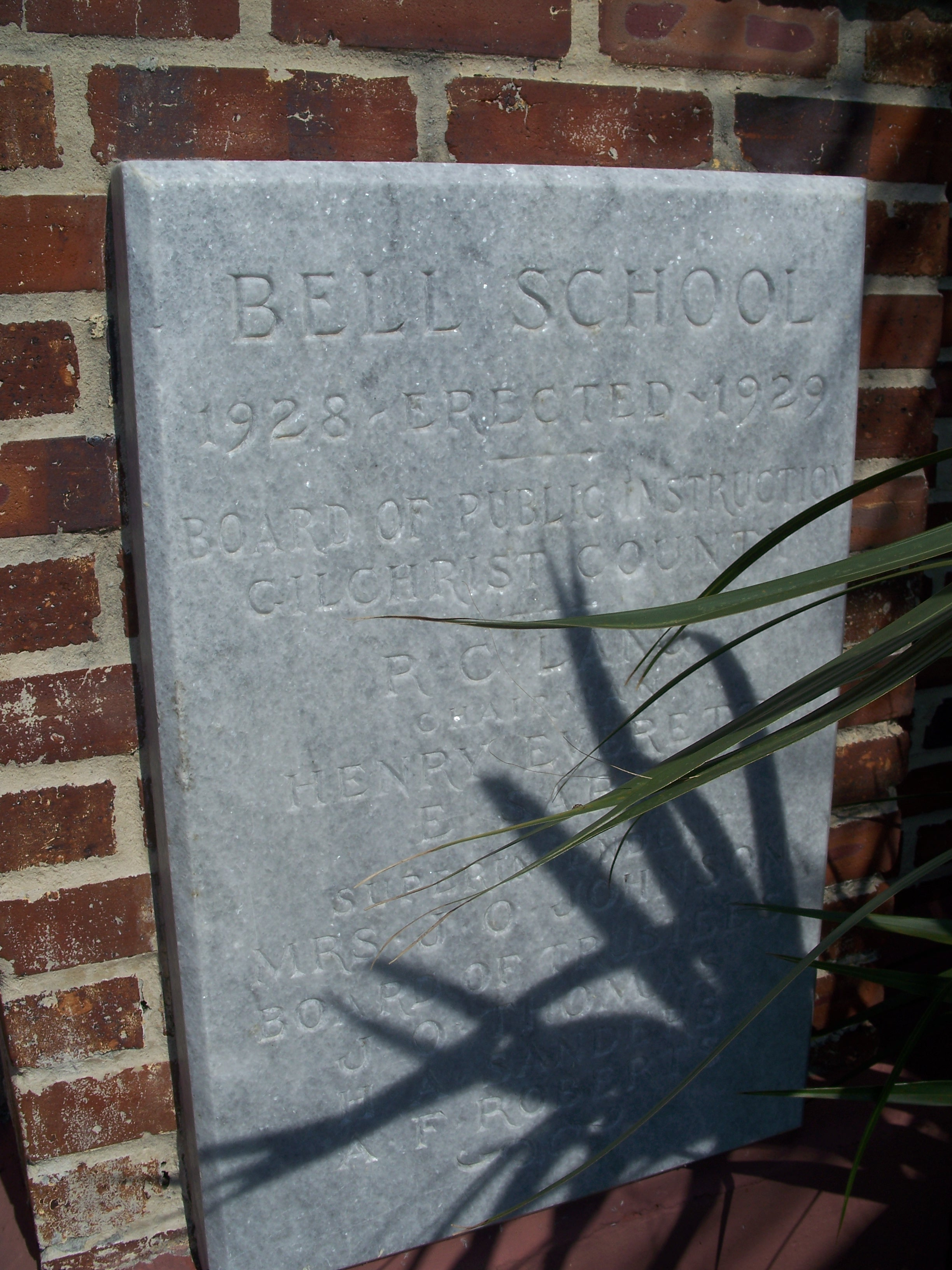
The cornerstone of Bell High School laid in 1928

- 21st Century Community Learning Centers
- Purple Powerhouse Band
- Beta Club
- Book Club
- Future Business Leaders of America (FBLA)
- Fellowship of Christian Athletes (FCA)
- Future Farmers of America (FFA)
- Hi-Q
- Health Occupations Students of America (HOSA)
- Junior Reserve Officer Training Corps (JROTC)
- Students Working Against Tobacco (SWAT)
- Yearbook

== Notable accomplishments ==
Bell High School's Junior Reserve Officers' Training Corps program received the "Honor Unit With Distinction" award for seven years in a row. It is currently run by SAI Col. McGill, AAI 1st Sgt. Mienholtz.

The Bell High School JV team went to Nationals in New Orleans on May 28, 2023, nearly winning, just one match away from winning.

Bell High School is known for is its excellent Criminal Justice program. Each year it participates in the Florida Public Service Association (FPSA) competition and won first place in at state competition in 2010–2011, 2011–2012, and 2012–2013. Several students from Bell Middle/High School serve on the board of the organization as well.

In June 2007 at the 88th Florida FFA State Convention Bell FFA member Jeffrey Lee Williams Jr. was elected and served as the 2007-2008 Area 2 State Vice President. The 1st in over 60 years from the school.
