= Historic communities of Alachua County =

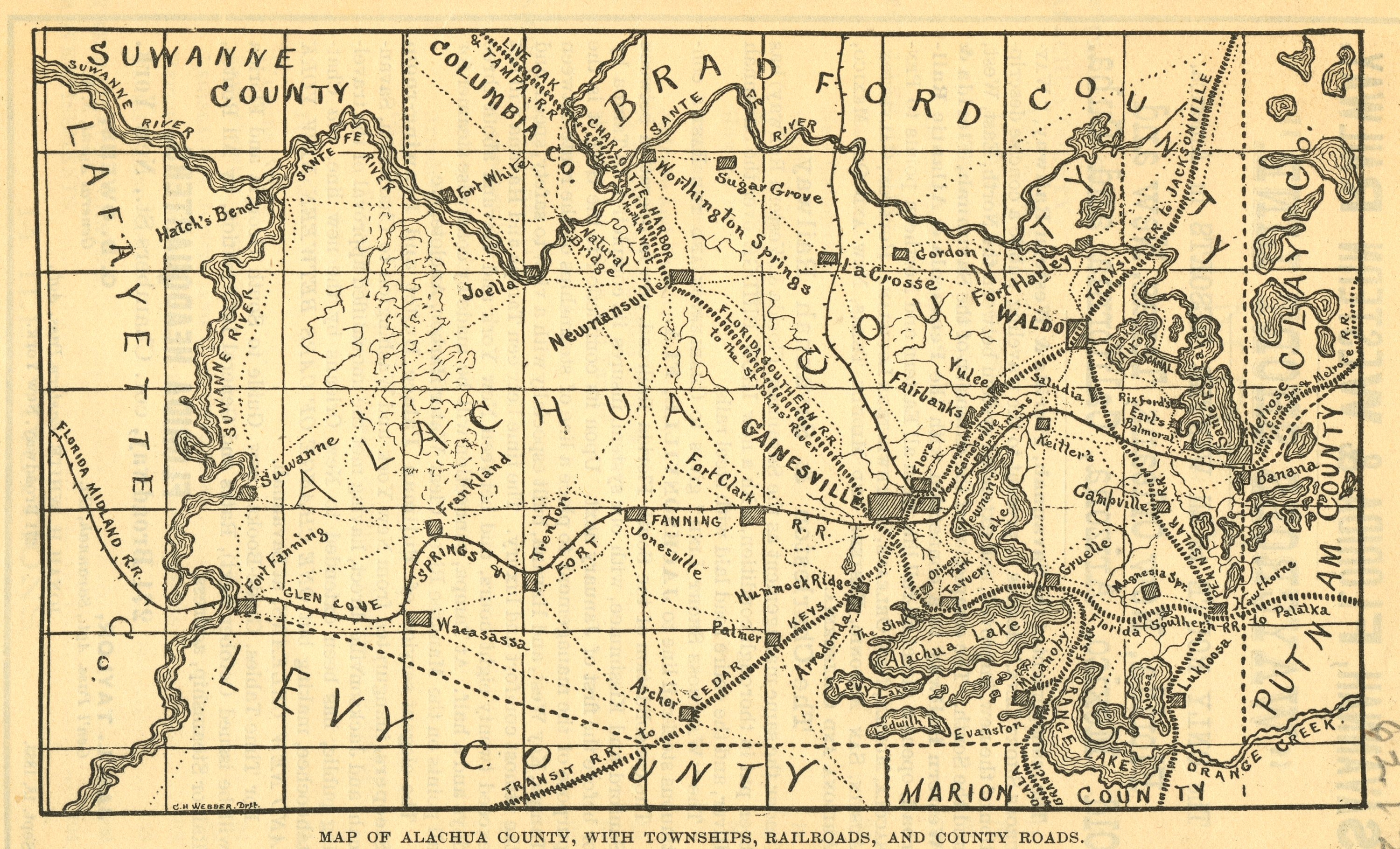
Map of Alachua County from 1883 showing the location of some historic communities

The historic communities of Alachua County were populated places and/or places with a post office that were established in the 19th century or early 20th century in what is now Alachua County, Florida, but which were abandoned, annexed into an incorporated municipality, or had a much reduced population by the later part of the 20th century.

- Arno was a community in northwestern Alachua County at 29.7719082°N 82.5553920°W. The community was named for George Arnow, publisher of the Cotton States, a newspaper published in Alachua County from 1860 until 1865. A post office was established in 1901, and closed in 1907.
- Atlas was a community in northern Alachua County at 29.8399649°N 82.3084406°W, a little south of the Santa Fe River. A post office was established in 1897, and closed in 1914.
- Battonville - See Palmer below in this list.
- Benjamin was a community in southern Alachua County. A post office was established in 1892, and closed in 1894, with mail service provided through Micanopy after the post office closed.
- Bennington was a community in Alachua County, southeast of the city of Alachua and west of Gainesville. A post office was established in 1897, and closed in 1905.
- Cadillac was a community in western Alachua County at 29.7416312°N 82.5387241°W. It was on the Atlantic Coast Line Railroad between Alachua and Newberry. A post office was established in 1900 and closed in 1909.
- Clark was a community in northwestern Alachua County at 29.7732956°N 82.6259497°W. It was on the Atlantic Coast Line Railroad between High Springs and Newberry. A post office was established in 1894 and closed in 1911.
- Clyatt was a community in southern Alachua County. It was on the Gainesville and Gulf Railway between Gainesville and Micanopy. A post office was established in 1900 and closed in 1907.
- Cyril was a community in northern Alachua County. It was on the Gainesville and Gulf Railway between Gainesville and Sampson City (in Bradford County). A post office was established in 1902 and closed in 1907.
- Dud was a community in western Alachua County. A post office was established in 1892 and closed in 1894, with mail service provided by the Jonesville post office after the Dud post office closed.
- Dutton was a community in western Alachua County. It was on the Atlantic Coast Line Railroad line between High Springs and Newberry. A post office was established in 1898 and closed in 1913.
- Forsberg was a community in western Alachua County. A post office was established in 1915 and closed in 1917. Mail service was provided by the Newberry post office after the Forsberg post office closed.
- Glenwood was a community in Alachua County. A post office was established in February 1885 and closed in October 1885.
- Gracy was a community in northwestern Alachua County. It was on the Savannah, Florida & Western Railway about 20 miles (32 km) northwest of Gainesville, between Newnansville (near present-day Alachua) and Sentaffey (present-day High Springs). It had a sawmill and a store. A post office was established in 1884 and closed in 1902.
- Haile (not to be confused with the Haile Homestead) was a community in western Alachua County at 29.6905202°N 82.5734464°W. It was on the Atlantic Coast Line Railroad midway between Alachua and Newberry. The town was named for the Haile family, who owned the adjacent Sanfelasco Plantation. John Haile of South Carolina had bought the Sanfelasco Plantation in 1857. It was located seven miles southwest of Newnansville between Cadillac and Kokomo.
- Hallie was a community in northern Alachua County southeast of La Crosse. A post office was established in 1894 and closed in 1895.
- Hatchett Creek - See Yulee below in this list.
- Hainesworth, or Haynesworth, was a community at 29.8196867°N 82.444556°E in northern Alachua County, on the Atlantic, Suwannee River and Gulf Railway (later part of the Seaboard Air Line Railroad) between Alachua and LaCrosse. A post office was established in 1900 and closed in 1908.
- Hogtown was an early 19th century community in central Alachua County. It was eventually abandoned after Gainesville was founded nearby on the route of the Florida Railroad. The former site of Hogtown was annexed into the city of Gainesville in the middle of the 20th century.
- Hope was a community in eastern Alachua County, between Hawthorne and Melrose. A post office was established in 1894 and closed in 1907.
- Hummock Ridge, later known as Hammock Ridge, was a community in central Alachua County on the Florida Transit and Peninsular Railroad (later part of the Florida Central and Western Railroad). It was the center of a well-regarded vegetable gtowing area. A post office named Hammock was established in 1888 and closed in 1896.
- Joella was a community established on the Santa Fe River west of Sentaffey (High Springs) in about 1850. A post office was established in 1880 and closed in 1885.
- Kanapaha was a community southwest of Gainesville at 29.5971899°N 82.4226063°W, on the Florida Railroad midway to Archer. The community included the Haile Homestead and the Kanapaha Presbyterian Church, founded in 1858, which still meets in a building constructed in 1886. A post office was established in 1887 and closed in 1907.
- Komoko was a community in western Alachua County. It was on the Atlantic Coast Line Railroad between Alachua and Newberry. A post office was established in 1900 and closed in 1914.
- Lexington was a community in western Alachua County, north of Newberry on the Atlantic Coast Line Railroad line from High Springs, A post office was established in 1894 and closed in 1906.
- Louise was a community in northwestern Alachua County at 29.8374652°N 82.2312160°W, near the Santa Fe River, 7 miles (11 km) west of Waldo. The community grew up around a homestead established in 1850. The population was about 200 in 1880, and was reported to be between 450 and 500 in 1884, when the community included schools, churches, two stores, a saw mill, grist mill, five sugar mills and a cotton gin. Orange groves and truck farms surrounded the community.
- Madisonboro (or Madisonborough) was a community in Alachua County, located on the mail route from Newnansville to Orange Springs (in Marion County). A post office was established in 1849 and closed in 1852.
- Mayfield was a community in northern Alachua County, on the Savannah, Florida & Western Railway about 5.5 miles (8.9 km) north of Gainesville. A post office was established in 1885 and closed in 1889.
- Millsworth was a community in Alachua County. A post office was established in 1880 and closed in 1881.
- Nettleton was a community in Alachua County. It was located on the Florida Southern Railway (later Atlantic Coast Line Railroad) between Rochelle and Evinston. A post office was established in 1899 and closed in 1904.
- Newnansville was a community at 29.8085756°N 82.4767791°W in Alachua County during the 19th century. It served as the county seat for much the time between the establishment of the county in 1824 and 1854, when the newly founded Gainesville became the county seat. The community was abandoned near the end of the 19th century when most of the residents and businesses moved to the nearby community of Alachua on the Savannah, Florida & Western Railway.
- Osceola was a community in western Alachua County, west of Clark. A post office was established in 1886 and closed in 1904.
- Palmer was a community in southwestern Alachua County. It was located on the Florida Transit and Peninsular Railroad (later part of the Florida Central and Western Railroad) midway between Arredondo and Archer. Originally named Battonville, the name was changed in 1883 in honor of Colonel Frank Palmer, a resident. In 1885, Palmer had a population of about 100, reported to all be "northerners". The Battonville post office was established in 1875. The name was changed to Palmer in 1883, and the post office was closed in 1907.
- Paradise was a community at 29.7049669°N 82.3453834°W on the Savannah, Florida and Western Railway north of Gainesville. It was annexed into the city of Gainesville in the 20th century.
- Phifer was a community at 29.5913579°N 82.1878767°W on the Florida Southern Railroad between Grove Park and Rochelle, consisting of a railroad station and several homes.
- Phoenix was a community in Alachua County. A post office opened in 1882 and closed in 1885. A saw mill employed 20 to 50 workers in 1885.
- Pineville was a community in Alachua County. A post office opened in 1897 and closed in 1901.
- Rex was a community in Alachua County at 29.6302462°N 82.0973195°W A post office opened in 1899 and closed in 1907.
- Rocky Point was a community in Alachua County at 29.5844128°N 82.3387147°W. A post office opened in 1896 and closed in 1906.
- Santa Fe is a community in Alachua County at 29.8835746°N 82.4304905°W. A post office opened in 1900. In 1960 the post office became a rural station of the Alachua post office. A general store housed the post office. A packing house is still located in Santa Fe.
- Socastee was a community on the Florida Southern Railway (later Atlantic Coast Line Railroad) between Rochelle and Grove Park. A post office was opened in 1915 and closed in 1920.
- Spring Grove was a community in Alachua County between Newnansville and Gainesville. It was the third place in Alachua County to have a post office established, in 1829. It was the county seat for the county from 1836 to 1839.The post office closed in 1848.
- Stewartsville was a community in Alachua County. A post office was opened in 1889 and closed in 1891.
- Sugar Grove was a community in northwestern Alachua County, near the Santa Fe River. A post office opened in 1858 and closed in 1867.
- Sutherland was a community in Alachua County. A post office opened in 1886 and closed in 1888.
- Tacoma was a community northwest of Micanopy at 29.5335814°N 82.3452330°W. A post office was opened in 1895 and closed in 1907.
- Tarver was a plantation, a fort, a townsite and a railroad station in Alachua County, Florida, United States. Tarver Plantation, named for its owner, was established on the north edge of Paynes's Prairie, about 0.8 miles (1.3 km) east of the Alachua Sink, in the 1830s. The plantation was fortified as Fort Tarver during the Second Seminole War. Part of the plantation, on a bluff overlooking the prairie, was given to the Florida Southern Railroad as a townsite to induce the company to build their railroad through the area. The railroad commenced operations between Palatka and Gainesville in 1881, with a scheduled stop at Tarver. As of 1883, only one house had been built on the townsite. The site is now an overlook in Paynes Prairie Preserve State Park accessible from the Gainesville-Hawthorne State Trail.
- Texan was a community near Jonesville. A post office opened in 1896 and closed in 1898.
- Wade was a community on the Atlantic Coast Line Railroad between High Springs and Newberry, at 29.7413518°N 82.6192822°W. A post office was established in 1893 and closed in 1930.
- Yulee was a community in northeastern Alachua County. It was located on the Transit Railroad between Fairbanks and Waldo. A post office named Hatchett Creek was established in 1878, and renamed Yulee in 1879. The post office was closed in 1887.

== Sources ==
- Ashby, J. W. (1888). Alachua, the Garden County of Florida. New York: The South Publishing Company.
- Bradbury, Alford G.; Hallock, E. Story (1962). A chronology of Florida post offices. Florida Federation of Stamp Clubs.
- Carlson, Lizabeth; Linville, Nicholas; Van Dyke, Ryan (November 2013). Cultural Resource Services for Work Projects in the Plum Creek Timber Company's Windsor Tract, East Alachua County, Florida (PDF) (Report). Southeastern Archaeological Research, Inc. Archived from the original (PDF) on June 11, 2021.
- Webb, Wanton S., ed. (1885). "Alachua County". Webb's Historical, Industrial and Biographical Florida. Part I. New York & Jacksonville, Florida: W.S. Webb and Company – via University of South Florida Libraries.
- Webber, Carl (1883). The Eden of the South. New York.
