= Cannon Farm =

Historic house in Florida, United States

- U.S. National Register of Historic Places
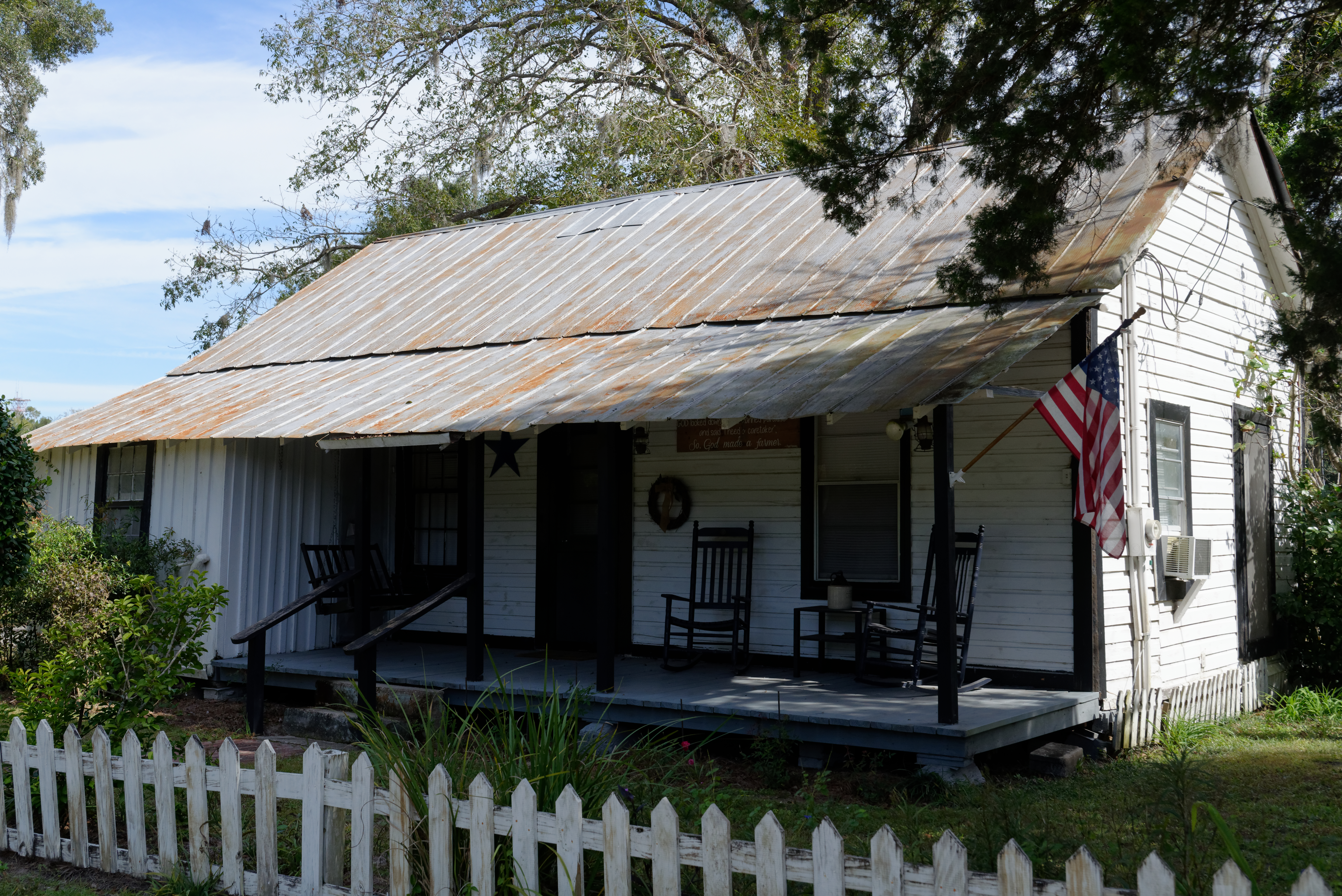
- Cannon Farm

- Location within Florida Location within the United States
- Location: 5470 NW. 37th Ct., Bell, Florida
- Coordinates: 29°49′3″N 82°52′16″W
- Area: 10 acres (4.0 ha)
- Built: 1931
- NRHP reference No.: 13000851
- Added to NRHP: 30 October 2013

The Cannon Farm is a historic farmstead at 5470 NW 37th Court in Bell, Florida. The main house is a vernacular wood-frame structure that was originally built in 1898 as a schoolhouse when the area was part of Alachua County. The 10-acre (4.0 ha) parcel includes, in addition to the main house, a sugar cane grinder dating to the turn of the 20th century, and a corn crib and sugar kettle shed dating to the early years of the farm, c. 1932. The complex is a well-preserved small rural farmstead.

The farmstead was listed on the National Register of Historic Places in 2013.
