= Waters Lake, Florida =

Unincorporated community in Florida, U.S.

Waters Lake is an unincorporated community in Gilchrist County, Florida, United States. It is located about 5 miles (8.0 km) south of Craggs, just east of State Road 47 on a lake of the same name, for which it is named.

== Geography ==
Waters Lake is located at 29.709°N 82.733°W, its elevation 82 feet (25 m).
