= Tampa and Jacksonville Railway =

Defunct railroad in Florida

The Tampa and Jacksonville Railway was a railroad in North Central Florida in the first half of the 20th century, with a length of 56 miles (90 km) at its greatest extent. It operated under several names in the half century of its existence.

== Gainesville and Gulf Railway ==
The Gainesville, Rocky Point, and Micanopy Railway was chartered in 1884, to connect Gainesville, Florida and Micanopy, Florida, in Alachua County. Although the company started with a capital stock of $300,000, progress was slow, and in 1894 L. L Hill purchased the charter and changed the name to Gainesville and Gulf Railway (sometimes called the "Grits and Gravy"). V. J. Herlong soon became President and part-owner of the company. Under his management, 12 miles (19 km) of standard gauge track were laid from Gainesville to Micanopy in 1895. In 1899 the track had been extended south of Micanopy to Fairfield, in Marion County, and in 1902 it was extended north of Gainesville to Sampson City, in Bradford County, where it connected with the Georgia Southern and Florida Railway and the Atlantic, Suwannee River and Gulf Railway. The line then had 48 miles (77 km) of track. The line carried locally produced lumber, oranges and farm produce. In 1900, the railroad's equipment included three locomotives, two passenger cars, a baggage car, and 14 freight cars.

== Tampa and Jacksonville Railway ==
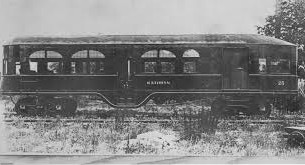
Railcar Kathryn of the Tampa and Jacksonville Railway, often called the "Hoodler"

The F. J. Lisman Company bought the line in 1906, and changed its name to the Tampa and Jacksonville Railway Company, with plans, never realized, to extend the line to reach those cities. An 8-mile (13 km) extension from Fairfield to Emathla, in Marion County, was constructed in 1910. Emathla was a source for phosphate and fuller's earth shipped on the railroad.

Starting in 1917, the railroad operated a gasoline-powered railcar, the Kathryn. The Kathryn had been designed by an engineer employed by the company, John A. Whiting, and built in the railroad's shop. The Kathryn was popularly known as the Hoodler, due to the whistling noise of its engine. The railcar provided passenger service from Gainesville to points north and west of Gainesville via the rail line's connection with the Georgia Southern and Florida at Sampson City. Passenger service south of Gainesville to Micanopy was provided by passenger cars attached at the end of freight trains. The roughness of the ride, together with the line's initials (T & J), led to the railroad sometimes being called the "Tug and Jerk".

Citrus and farm produce from growers along the railroad's route were an important part of the line's business, and, in a time when communications were slow in rural areas, the Tampa and Jacksonville would warn growers of an impending freeze by repeatedly blowing four short blasts on the locomotive whistle as a train passed through growing areas.

== Jacksonville, Gainesville, and Gulf Railway ==
The Seaboard Air Line Railroad bought the assets of the Tampa and Jacksonville Railroad in 1926 and reorganized it as the Jacksonville, Gainesville, and Gulf Railway. The Jacksonville, Gainesville, and Gulf abandoned the track from north of Gainesville to Sampson City in 1930. Regular passenger service on the Jacksonville, Gainesville, and Gulf was also halted in 1930, although passengers were occasionally carried in the caboose on freight trains. The remainder of the Jacksonville, Gainesville, & Gulf was abandoned in 1944, except for the track running through Gainesville, which was bought by the Atlantic Coast Line Railroad. The Atlantic Coast Line used that line to replace its rail line running on Main Street in Gainesville in 1948.

== Sources ==
- Turner, Gregg (2003). A Short History of Florida Railroads. Charleston, South Carolina: Arcadia. ISBN 0-7385-2421-2.
- Watkins, Caroline (1975). "Some Early Railroads in Alachua County". The Florida Historical Quarterly. 53 (4): 450–459. ISSN 0015-4113. JSTOR 30150300.
