= Curtis, Florida =

Unincorporated community in Florida, U.S.

Curtis is an unincorporated community in Gilchrist County, Florida, United States. It is located approximately 2 miles (3.2 km) southwest of Bell.

== Geography ==
Curtis is located at 29.737°N 82.898°W, its elevation 59 feet (18 m).
