= Lady Lake Historical Society Museum =

American museum

Coordinates: 28.91574°N 81.92241°W

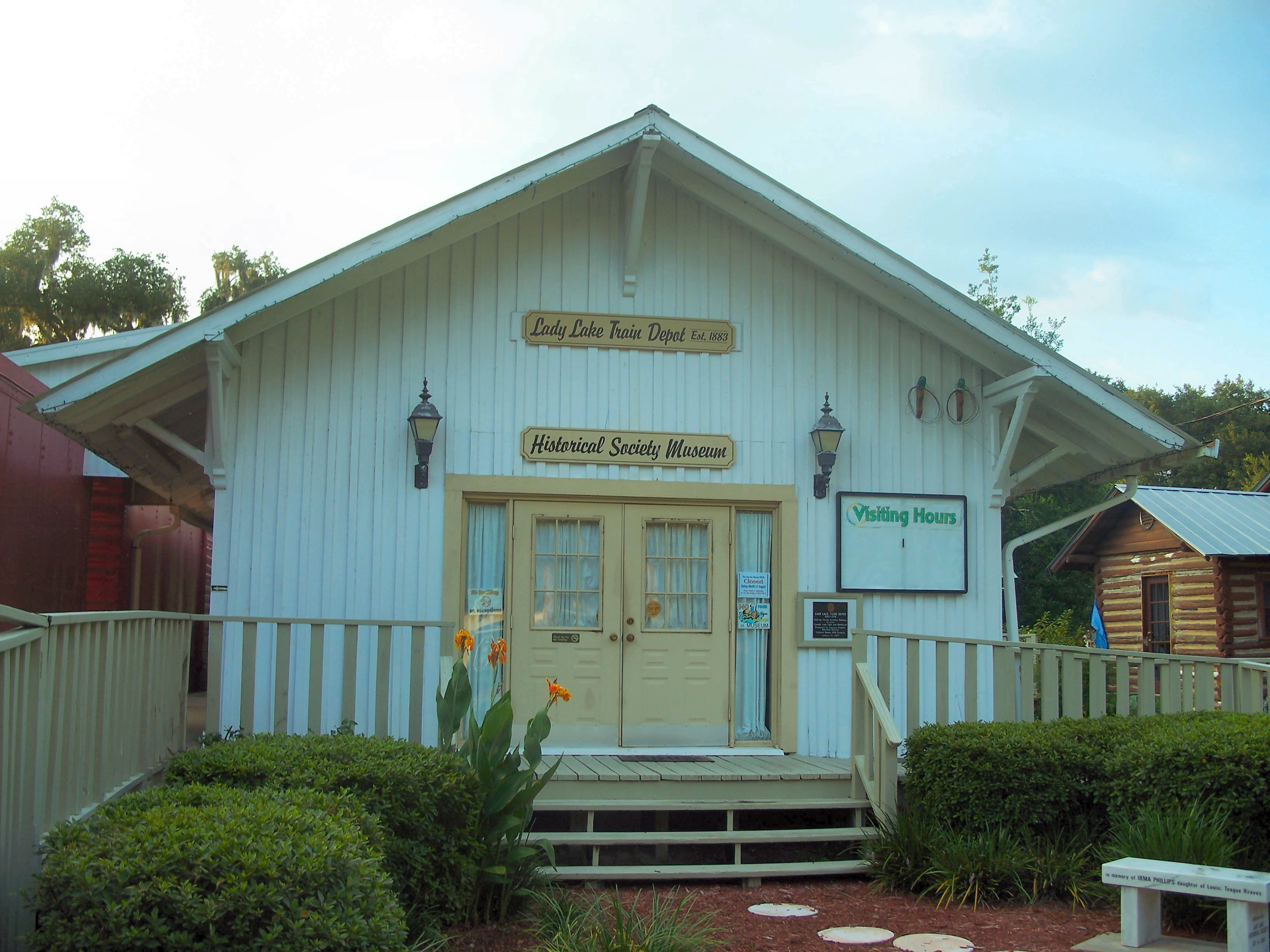
Lady Lake Historical Society Museum Building

Lady Lake Historical Society Museum is a local history museum in Lady Lake, Lake County, Florida. The building was originally built by the Atlantic Coast Line Railroad for their High Springs—Croom Line. Exhibits include citrus industry artifacts, a miniature HO gauge railroad, furniture, tools, photographs, and memorabilia. The museum is located behind a log cabin on West Lady Lake Boulevard, between Old Dixie Highway and U.S. Routes 27 and 441.

== See also ==
- List of museums in Florida

Preceding station	Atlantic Coast Line Railroad	Following station
Former services
Fruitland Park toward St. Petersburg	Ocala District	Connant toward Jacksonville
