= Hague, Florida =

Unincorporated community in Florida, U.S.

Coordinates: 29°46′14″N 82°25′16″W

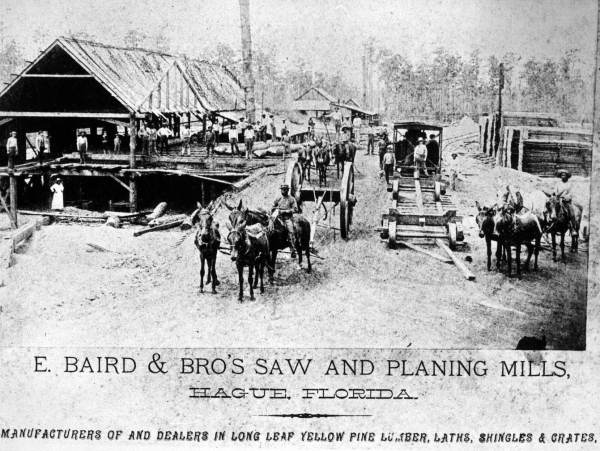
Saw and planing mill in Hague, Florida, 1880s

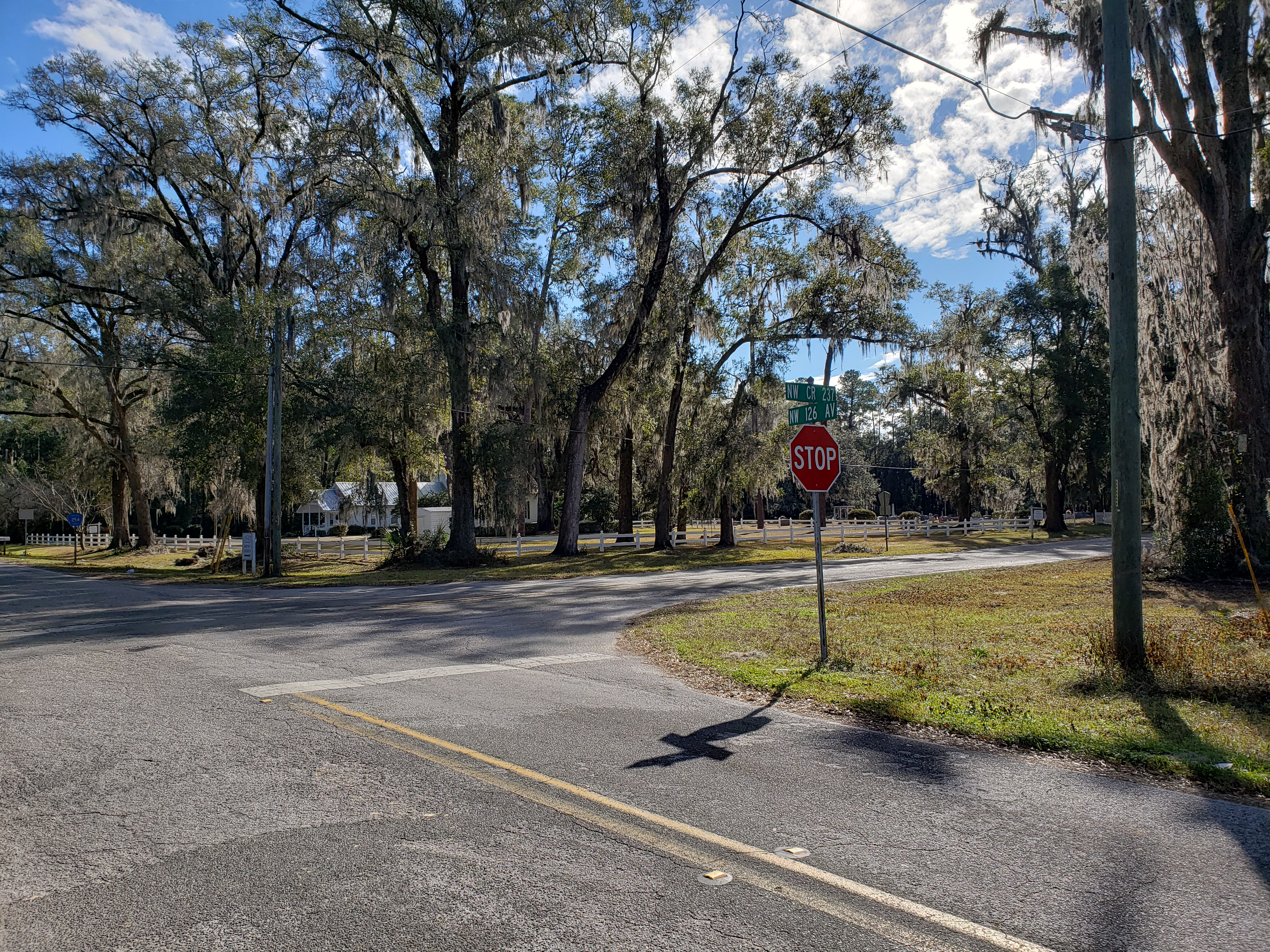
Methodist church in Hague, Florida, 2022

Hague is an unincorporated community in Alachua County, Florida, United States. It is located on Alachua County Road 237 between U.S. Route 441 and the Deerhaven Subdivision line of the CSX Railroad, between the cities of Alachua and Gainesville.

== History ==
Hague was established early in 1884 on the newly completed Savannah, Florida and Western Railway line between High Springs and Gainesville. It was named after Archelaus Hague (1828–1899), who was an early settler and landowner, and postmaster. By later in 1884, the community had about 75 residents, and in 1888 had three stores, two lumber mills, and three churches, as well as an express office and a post office. Large quantities of fruit and vegetables were shipped to northern states from Hague. Produce shipments continued from Hague through much of the 20th century. The University of Florida's Dairy Unit is located at Hague.

The post office opened in 1883 and closed in 1929.
