= Live Oak, Tampa and Charlotte Harbor Railroad =

Historic railroad in Florida

- Interactive Map of Live Oak, Tampa and Charlotte Harbor Railroad main line (red) and branches (dark red)

Overview
- Locale: Florida
- Dates of operation: 1883–1902
- Successor: Atlantic Coast Line Railroad

Technical
- Track gauge: 4 ft 8 1/2 in (1,435 mm) standard gauge

The Live Oak, Tampa and Charlotte Harbor Railroad was a historic railroad in Florida chartered by railroad tycoon Henry B. Plant. It was built as an extension of Plant's Live Oak and Rowlands Bluff Railroad. Together, the two lines ran from Live Oak, Florida, to Gainesville via High Springs. The lines were completed in 1884.

== History ==
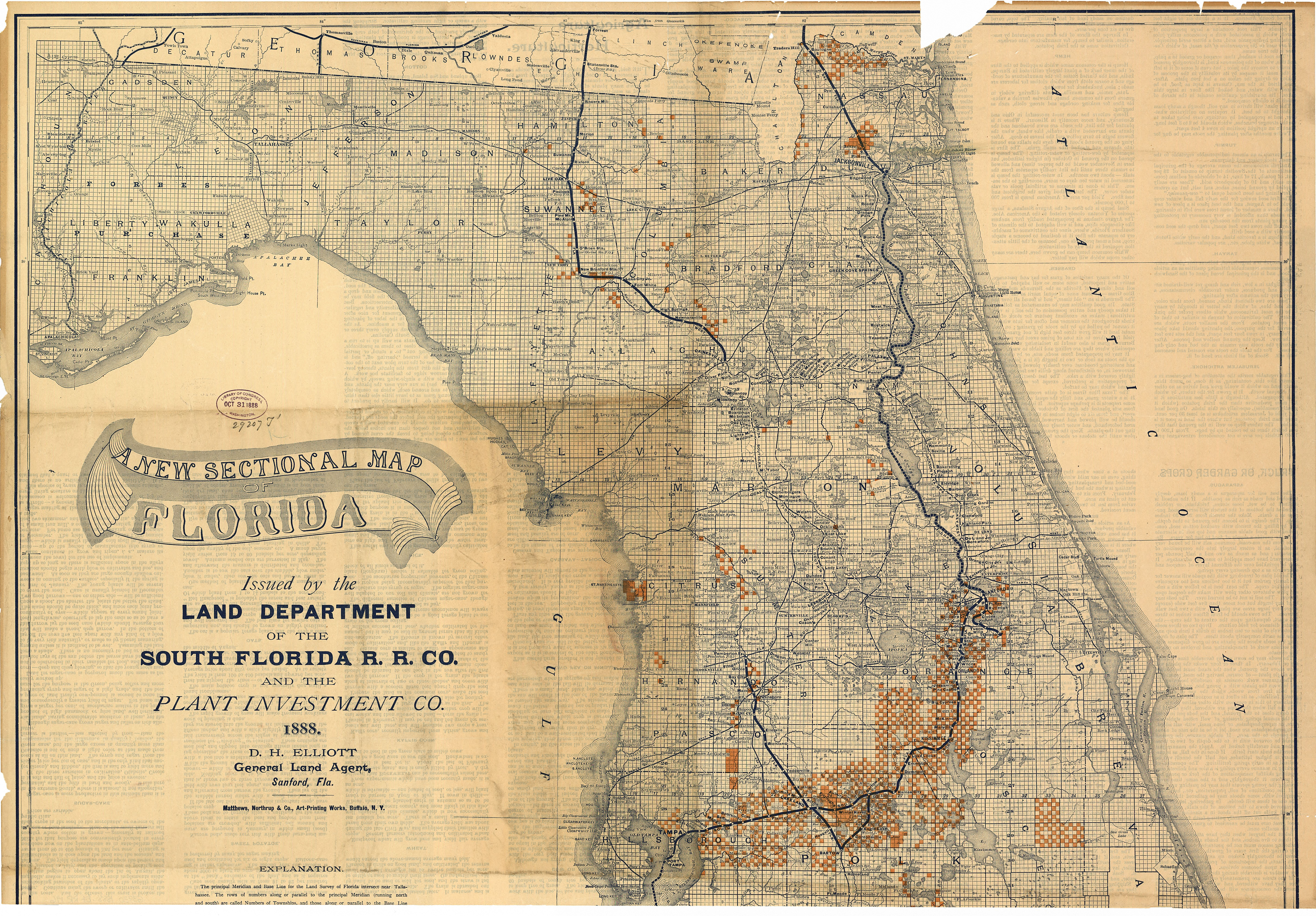
1888 map showing Live Oak, Tampa and Charlotte Harbor Railroad and related rail lines

The Live Oak and Rowlands Bluff Railroad was chartered to run from Live Oak to Rowlands Bluff (known today as Branford) on the Suwannee River, which was complete in the early 1880s. It was chartered an extension of the Florida Division of Plant's Savannah, Florida and Western Railroad, which originated in Lawton, Georgia (now known as DuPont) and was the first railroad to cross the Florida/Georgia Border. Plant had acquired his lines in Georgia from the Atlantic and Gulf Railroad in 1879.

Upon completion of the Live Oak and Rowlands Bluff Railroad, Plant quickly chartered the Live Oak, Tampa and Charlotte Harbor Railroad to continue the line south through peninsular Florida to Charlotte Harbor. However, during construction, Plant learned that a competing line, the Florida Southern Railway, had similar plans. The Florida Southern's plans included a line from Lake City to Charlotte Harbor in a similar path with a branch to Palatka. The Florida Southern had completed track from Gainesville to Palatka and construction was underway between Gainesville and Hague to connect to Lake City when Plant learned of their plans.

To avoid competition, Plant made an unsuccessful attempt to buy the Florida Southern. Despite this, he managed to make a deal with the Florida Southern. In the agreement, the two lines would combine into one. The Florida Southern would operate south of Gainesville and the Live Oak, Tampa and Charlotte Harbor Railroad would exist north of there and the two firms would share trackage rights. Plant would take over and finish the Florida Southern's line north of Gainesville and would provide financial assistance to the Florida Southern to continue south. Litigation from Lake City quickly ensued as they were now being bypassed under this new plan. This lead Plant to build a branch from just northwest of Fort White to Lake City.

In 1893, a branch was built from High Springs south through Newberry to Archer.

=== Later years ===
The Plant System was acquired by the Atlantic Coast Line Railroad in 1902. The Atlantic Coast Line designated the line as their DuPont—High Springs Line north of High Springs, and the High Springs—Croom Line south of there to Gainesville (which also included the former Florida Southern).

The Atlantic Coast Line would extend the branch to Archer south to Morriston in 1913 to connect with the former Silver Springs, Ocala and Gulf Railroad, which would create a more direct route down the west coast and to Lakeland instead of the former Florida Southern line. This line would ultimately become the Atlantic Coast Line's High Springs—Lakeland Line. The High Springs—Lakeland Line became a major freight route for the Atlantic Coast Line, with High Springs being a major freight yard. By 1949, that segment was carrying at least three round-trip freight trains daily.

In 1948, the Atlantic Coast Line rerouted the line in central Gainesville from Main Street to instead run along 6th Street, where they built a new depot. This rerouted segment used the former right of way of the Gainesville and Gulf Railroad.

The Atlantic Coast Line would then become the Seaboard Coast Line Railroad in 1967. In the Seaboard Coast Line-era, the line from Branford to High Springs (along with track north to DuPont) was designated as the DuPont Subdivision. The branch to Archer and its extension would be the West Coast Subdivision. Track from Burnett's Lake (near Alachua) to Gainesville was the Ocala and Gainesville Subdivisions.

In 1980, the Seaboard Coast Line's parent company merged with the Chessie System, creating the CSX Corporation. The CSX Corporation initially operated the Chessie and Seaboard Systems separately until 1986, when they were merged into CSX Transportation.

== Current conditions ==
Much of the main line of the Live Oak, Tampa and Charlotte Harbor Railroad was abandoned by CSX in the late 1980s though track remains from Burnett's Lake to just north of Gainesville today. This line is now CSX's Deerhaven Subdivision.

The short line Florida Northern Railroad took over the West Coast Subdivision in 1988. Track from High Springs to Newberry was removed in 2014, but the line is still active from Newberry south to Dunnellon.

The Suwannee River Greenway runs on some of the former right of way in Branford. The Heritage Trail runs on another segment in Live Oak, south of U.S. Route 90.
