= Lady Lake, Florida =

Town in the state of Florida, United States

- Town
- Town of Lady Lake
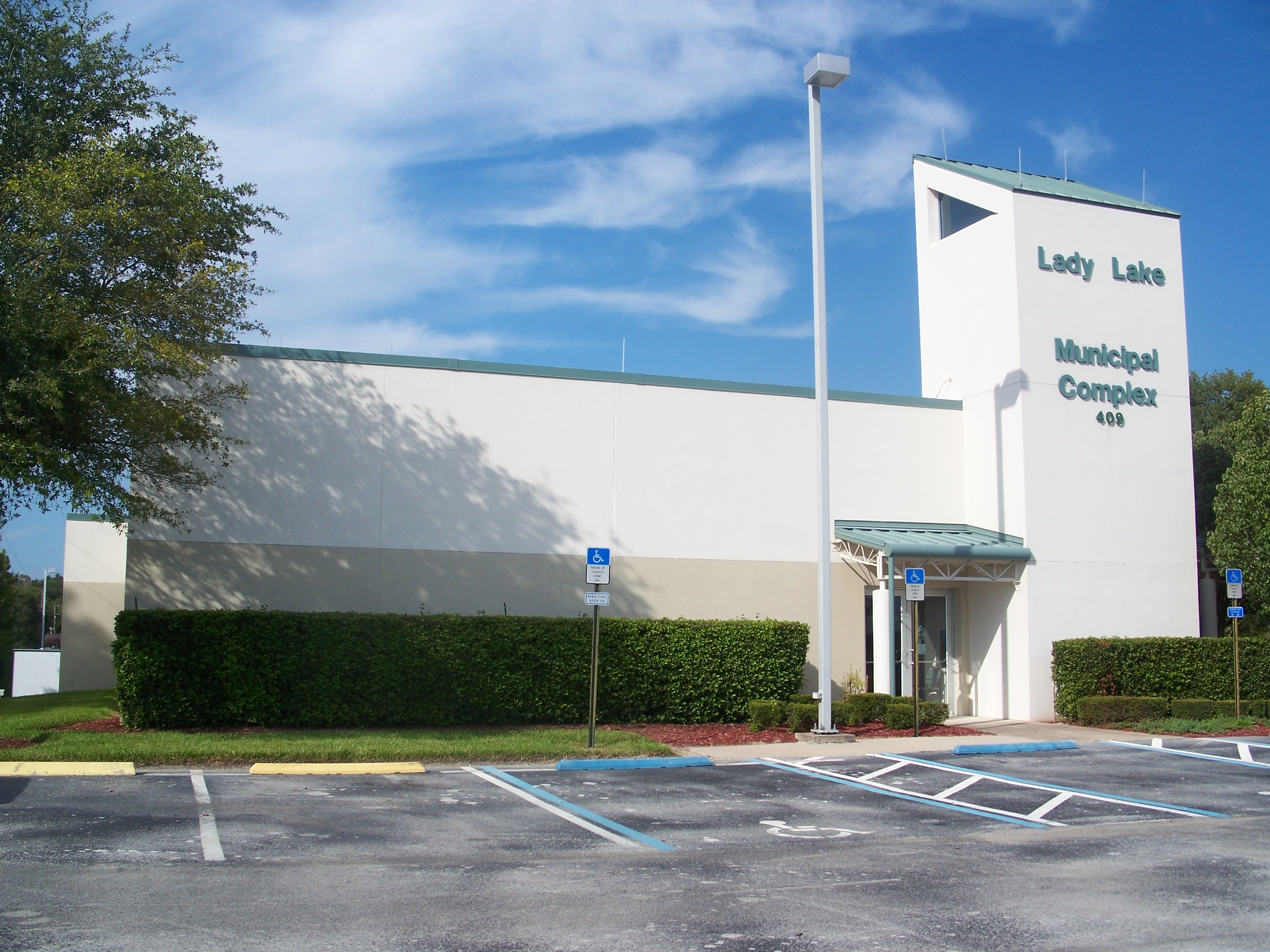
- Municipal complex, including city hall

- Seal

- Location in Lake County and the state of Florida
- Coordinates: 28°55′24″N 81°55′51″W
- Country: United States
- State: Florida
- County: Lake
- Established: Circa 1883

Area
  - Total: 8.58 sq mi (22.22 km^{2})
  - Land: 8.32 sq mi (21.55 km^{2})
  - Water: 0.25 sq mi (0.66 km^{2})
- Elevation: 82 ft (25 m)

Population (2020)
  - Total: 15,970
  - Density: 1,918.9/sq mi (740.91/km^{2})
- Time zone: UTC-5 (Eastern (EST))
  - Summer (DST): UTC-4 (EDT)
- ZIP codes: 32158, 32159, 32162
- Area code: 352
- FIPS code: 12-37375
- GNIS feature ID: 2405965
- Website: www.ladylakefl.gov

Lady Lake is a town in Lake County, Florida, United States. It is part of the Orlando–Kissimmee–Sanford Metropolitan Statistical Area. Area history is exhibited at the Lady Lake Historical Society Museum. The population was 15,970 at the 2020 census.

== History ==
Lady Lake was named after the lake in the area, and grew from Seminole territory and become railroad-fueled around 1883. It would be incorporated in 1925 and would gain fame as the birthplace of The Villages. In 2007 it was hit by an EF3 Tornado during the 2007 Groundhog Day tornado outbreak.

== Geography ==
According to the United States Census Bureau, the town has a total area of 6.8 square miles (18 km^{2}), of which 6.6 square miles (17 km^{2}) is land and 0.1 square miles (0.26 km^{2}) (2.07%) is water.

== Demographics ==
Historical population
Census	Pop.	Note	%±
1930	233		—
1940	309		32.6%
1950	331		7.1%
1960	335		1.2%
1970	382		14.0%
1980	1,193		212.3%
1990	8,071		576.5%
2000	11,828		46.5%
2010	13,926		17.7%
2020	15,970		14.7%
U.S. Decennial Census

=== Racial and ethnic composition ===
Lady Lake racial composition (Hispanics excluded from racial categories) (NH = Non-Hispanic)
Race	Pop 2010	Pop 2020	% 2010	% 2020
White (NH)	12,279	13,114	88.17%	82.12%
Black or African American (NH)	685	836	4.92%	5.23%
Native American or Alaska Native (NH)	42	33	0.30%	0.21%
Asian (NH)	150	233	1.08%	1.46%
Pacific Islander or Native Hawaiian (NH)	13	8	0.09%	0.05%
Some other race (NH)	16	55	0.11%	0.34%
Two or more races/Multiracial (NH)	146	405	1.05%	2.54%
Hispanic or Latino (any race)	595	1,286	4.27%	8.05%
Total	13,926	15,970		

=== 2020 census ===
As of the 2020 census, Lady Lake had a population of 15,970. The median age was 67.6 years. 9.6% of residents were under the age of 18 and 55.2% of residents were 65 years of age or older. For every 100 females there were 83.7 males, and for every 100 females age 18 and over there were 81.6 males age 18 and over.

98.9% of residents lived in urban areas, while 1.1% lived in rural areas.

There were 8,506 households in Lady Lake, of which 10.7% had children under the age of 18 living in them. Of all households, 40.8% were married-couple households, 19.3% were households with a male householder and no spouse or partner present, and 34.4% were households with a female householder and no spouse or partner present. About 41.1% of all households were made up of individuals and 29.5% had someone living alone who was 65 years of age or older.

There were 10,314 housing units, of which 17.5% were vacant. The homeowner vacancy rate was 1.9% and the rental vacancy rate was 18.8%.

According to the 2020 ACS 5-year estimates, there were 4,596 families residing in the town.

=== 2010 census ===
As of the 2010 United States census, there were 13,926 people, 7,488 households, and 4,352 families residing in the town.

=== 2000 census ===
As of the 2000 United States census, there were 11,828 people, 6,125 households, and 4,293 families in the town. The population density was 1,787.2 inhabitants per square mile (690.0/km^{2}). There were 6,998 housing units at an average density of 1,057.4 per square mile (408.3/km^{2}). The racial makeup of the town was 95.32% White, 3.24% Black or African American, 0.20% Native American or Native Alaskan, 0.31% Asian, 0.06% Pacific Islander or Native Hawaiian, 0.37% from other races, and 0.50% from two or more races. Hispanic or Latino of any race were 1.83%.

Of the 6,125 households in 2000, 7.1% had children under the age of 18 living with them, 64.0% were married couples living together, 4.8% had a female householder with no husband present, and 29.9% were non-families. 26.5% of households were one person and 20.9% were one person aged 65 or older. The average household size was 1.91 and the average family size was 2.22.

In 2000, the age distribution was 7.7% under the age of 18, 2.1% from 18 to 24, 8.8% from 25 to 44, 20.6% from 45 to 64, and 60.8% 65 or older. The median age was 68 years old. For every 100 females, there were 86.5 males. For every 100 females age 18 and over, there were 85.7 males.

In 2000, the median household income was $32,581 and the median family income was $37,887. Males had a median income of $22,043 versus $18,450 for females. The per capita income for the town was $21,337. About 5.2% of families and 8.4% of the population were below the poverty line, including 39.1% of those under age 18 and 2.8% of those age 65 or over.

== Parks and recreation ==
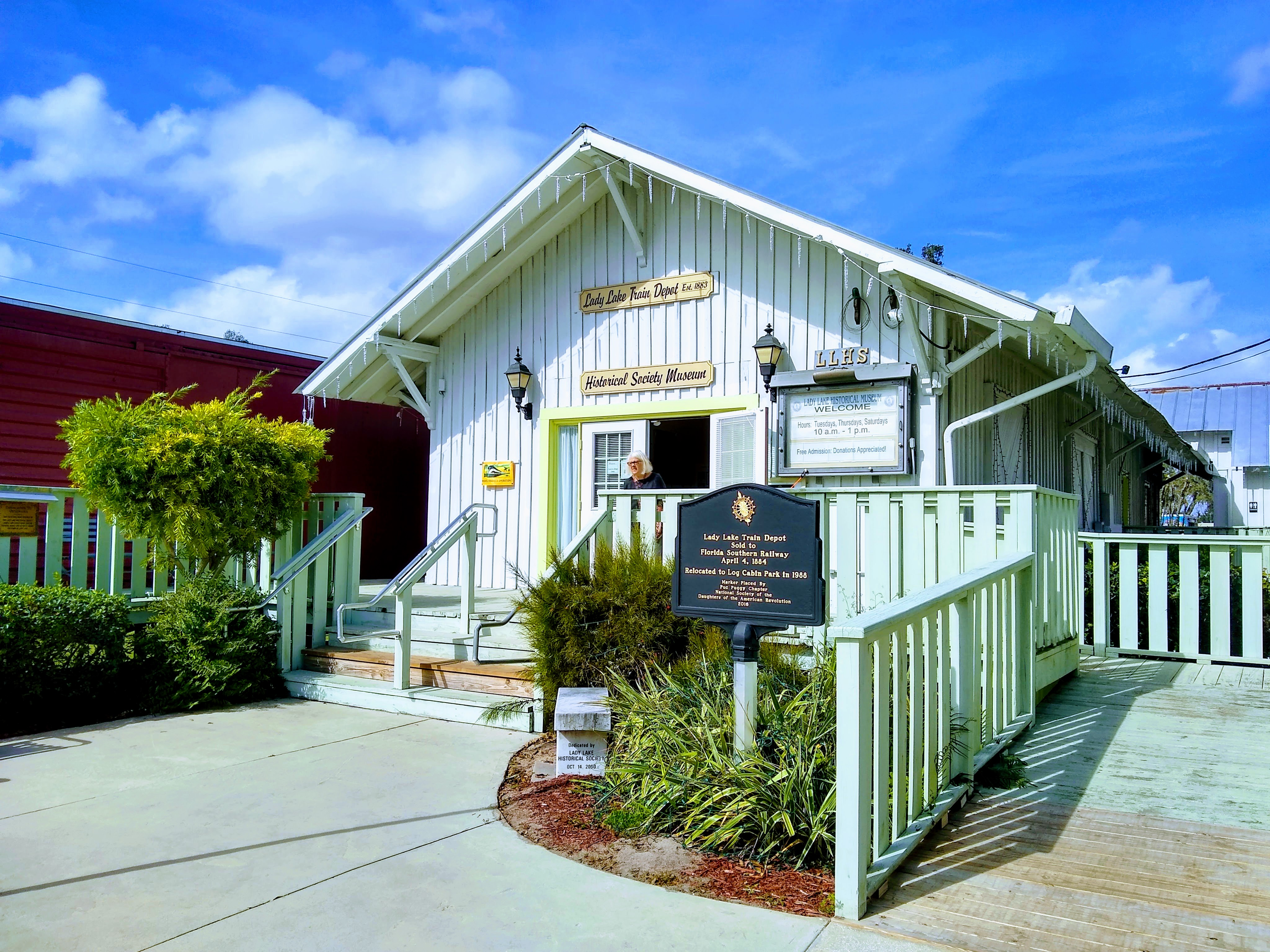
The train depot in Lady Lake is now the Historical Society Museum.

The town operates the Lady Lake Community Building, which may be used for public events.

Parks and recreation centers located within the town include:

- Greater Lady Lake Dog Park
- Guava Street Athletic Complex
- Heritage Park
- Pyramid Park
- Rolling Acres Sports Complex
- Snooky Park
- Veterans Park

== Education ==
Lake County Schools operates public schools in Lady Lake. The Villages Elementary School of Lady Lake, which serves the town, opened in 1999. Carver Middle School in Leesburg and Leesburg High School also serve Lady Lake.

== Library ==
The Lady Lake Public Library is located at 225 Guava Street and is a part of the Lake County Library System. This library serves all ages and provides services and materials to community residents. Programs and Events include the Beanstack Reading Tracker, an Annual Poetry Contest, the Flash Fiction Writing Contest, Poetry in the Garden, Poet Laureate, Pumpkin Chuckin’ Contest, and a Summer Reading Program. In addition, the digital library offers access to the Ancestry Library, the Florida Electronic Library, Heritage Quest, Overdrive/Libby Catalog, LinkedIn Learning, Tumblebooks Catalog, ABC Mouse, AtoZdatabases, Employ Florida Marketplace, Florida One-Stop Career Center, the New York Times, Occupational Outlook Handbook, Pronunciator, TumbleMath, Tutor.com, and the WorldCat Database. Services offered by the library include Ask A Librarian, Books by Mail, Summer Reading Lists, Technology Classes, Legal Resources, Reciprocal Borrowing, and Talking Books for Sight Impaired.

The Lady Lake Public Library is supported by the Friends of the Library, a nonprofit entity that assists the library in its operations. The library also advertises access to Lynda, an online learning resource for connecting with courses on technical, creative, and business subjects. This program is available for free with a library card. The library also hosts events including regular events such as Storytimes, AARP Tax Aides, Family Crafting, history meetings, Tiny Tots Sensory Stay & Play, technology classes, author meetings, and additional weekly programming as scheduled. The programming includes events for all age groups.
