= Students Working Against Tobacco =

Group of political organizations

Students Working Against Tobacco or SWAT is the shared name of independent groups across the United States who work to educate and unite students against the alleged manipulation and targeting of youth by tobacco companies. Each division of SWAT is managed independently from state-to-state.

The first SWAT group was established in Florida schools in 1998. In order to execute this program from a grassroots level, the State of Florida chose 10 youth to lead the statewide initiative, Cleveland Robinson was one of these youth. In 1997, the state of Florida settled a lawsuit against tobacco companies for 11.3 billion dollars (later increased to over 13 billion dollars through a friendly language clause) to be paid out over the next 25 years. The then governor Lawton Chiles directed money won in the settlement to fund a state program to prevent youth smoking. Out of these funds came SWAT. From 1998 to 2003, youth smoking decreased by more than 50% among Florida youth in grades 6-12.

SWAT continues its operations in Florida under the guidance of four Regional Tobacco Prevention Coordinators. Florida received another tobacco settlement in 2005 and on November 7, 2006, Floridians voted to pass Amendment 4 requiring 15% ($57 million) of the settlement to be used to fund a statewide tobacco education and prevention program. This funding has been made available to individual counties to be spent at their discretion. The Centers for Disease Control have not recognized youth-led tobacco prevention efforts as valid. Florida’s county-level tobacco control programs maintain local infrastructure by establishing tobacco-free partnerships, sustaining SWAT chapters and supporting policy, systems and environmental changes in accordance with the Florida Department of Health’s annual program report.

According to Tina Rosenberg, on pages 66–82 of her book Join the Club, the information about tobacco-industry propaganda and manipulation of youth (such as the Joe Camel ad campaign) to get them hooked on tobacco was the most effective PR tool in Florida's SWAT campaign. She goes on to describe how SWAT was gradually defanged after Jeb Bush became governor and the legislature began to cut funding. The current campaign, managed by Florida's Department of Health, uses only the information that has been found to be less effective in reducing teen smoking.

On page 75, Rosenberg describes research by RTI International showing that only two beliefs actually correlate with lower teen smoking: 1) cigarette companies lie, and 2) cigarette companies try to get youth to start smoking. On page 78, she notes that the "tobacco industry gave its approval to themes of addictiveness, health effects, and social costs because they were the proven failures. The states probably agreed to them at the time [of the Master Settlement Agreement] because they didn't know better."

Other such programs exist, though sometimes with a variation in name, in states including Michigan, New York and Oklahoma.

SWAT conducts school- and community-based advocacy campaigns which address e-cigarettes and youth marketing such as the statewide “Not A Lab Rat” initiative.
