= Lottieville, Florida =

Unincorporated community in Florida, U.S.

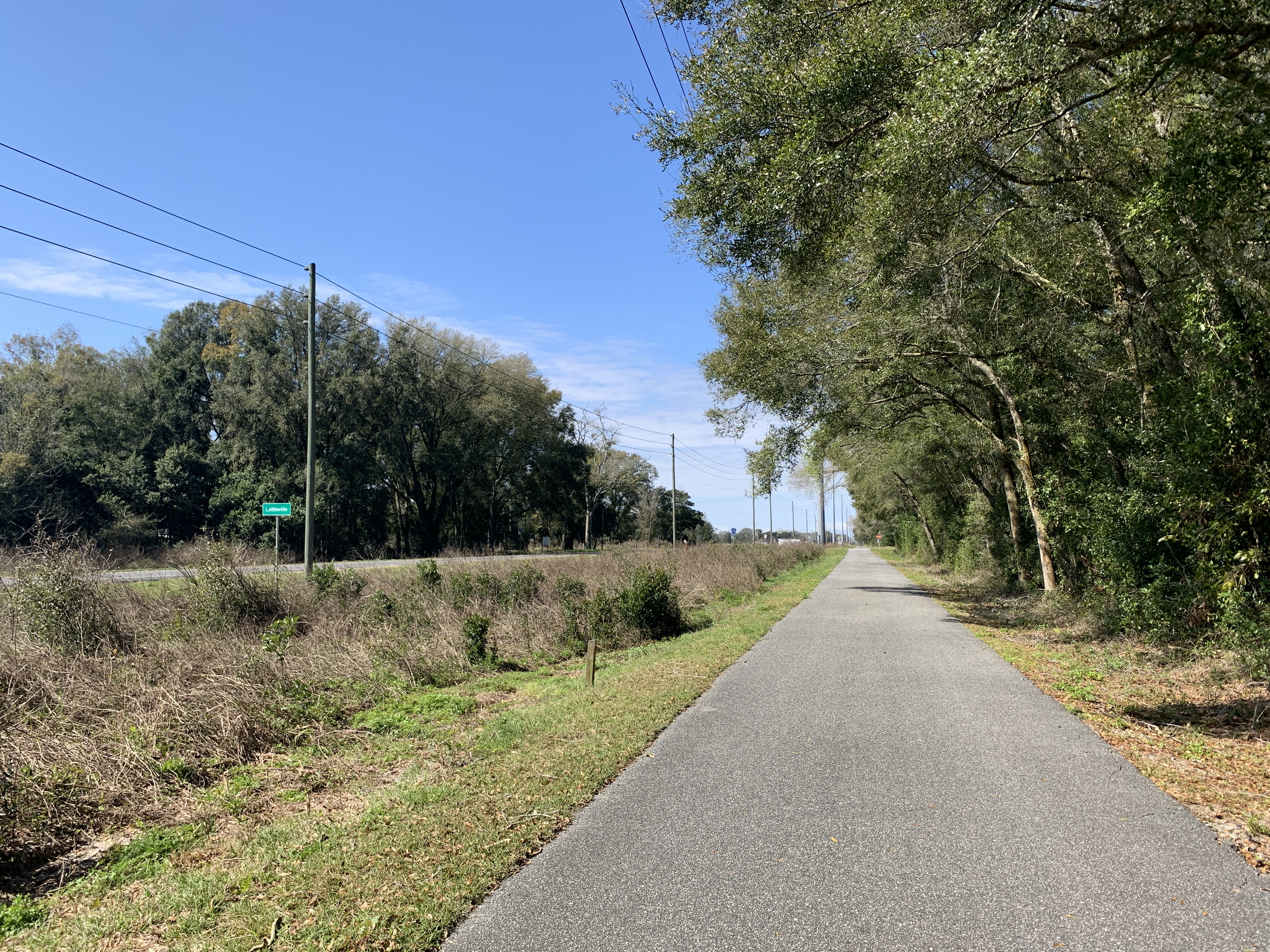
Lottieville, Florida

Lottieville is an unincorporated community in Gilchrist County, Florida, United States. It is located on State Road 26, approximately 5 miles (8.0 km) west of Trenton.

== Geography ==
Lottieville is located at 29.612°N 82.898°W, its elevation 43 feet (13 m).

Lottieville was a stop on the Atlantic Coast Line Railroad Jacksonville—Wilcox Line, between the communities of Wilcox and Trenton. Today, the line is used by the Nature Coast State Trail.
