= Wilcox, Florida =

Unincorporated community in Florida, U.S.

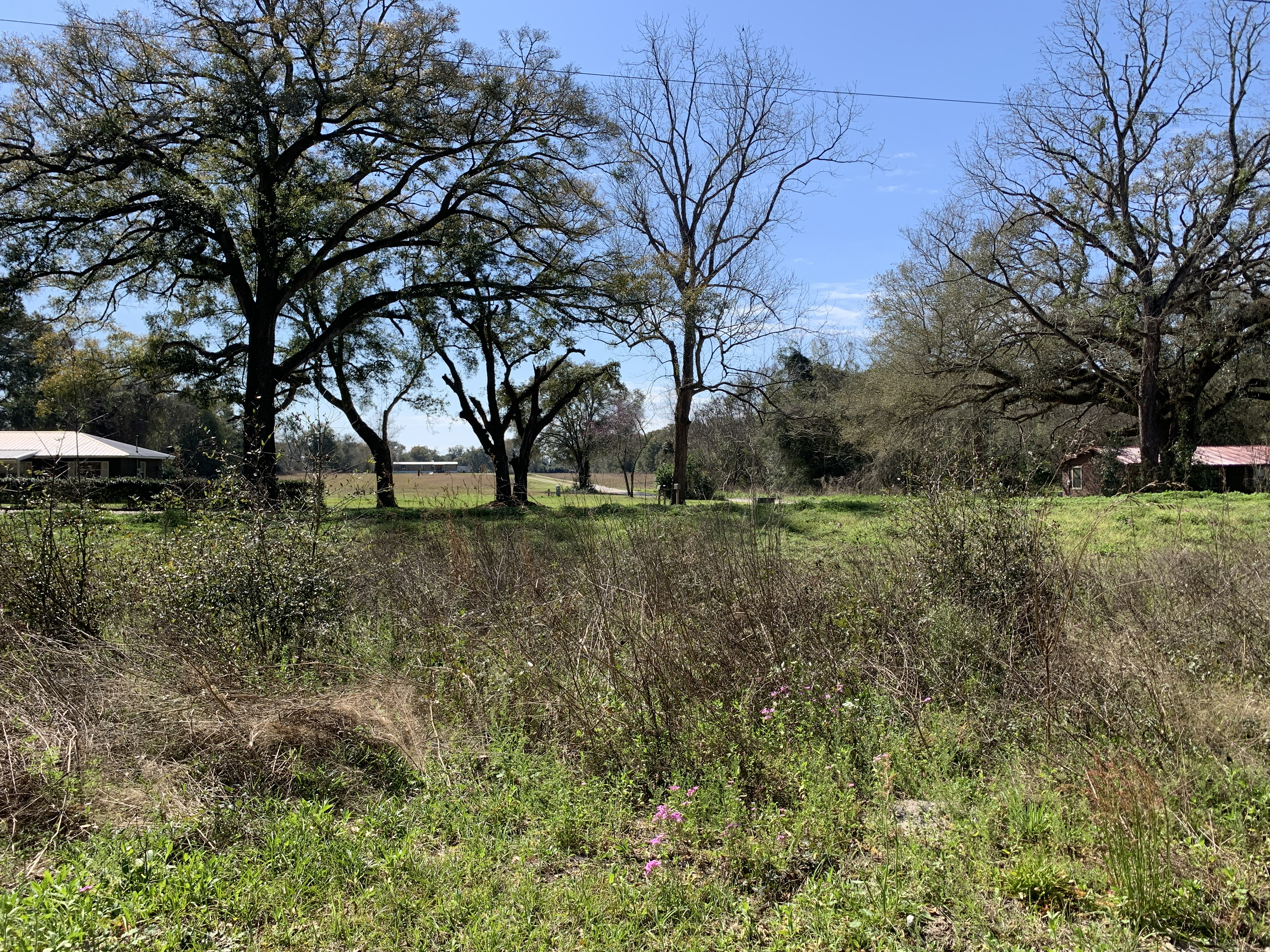
Wilcox, Florida

Wilcox is an unincorporated community in Gilchrist County, Florida, United States. It is located about 1 mile (1.6 km) west of Lottieville, at the bend in State Road 26.

== Geography ==
Wilcox is located at 29.611°N 82.922°W, its elevation 39 feet (12 m).

Wilcox was the westernmost stop on the Atlantic Coast Line Railroad Jacksonville—Wilcox Line, before that line connected to a wye at Wilcox Junction with the Atlantic Coast Line Railroad Thomasville—Dunnellon Line. Today, all three legs of this wye are used by the Nature Coast State Trail.
