= Wannee, Florida =

Unincorporated community in Florida, U.S.

Wannee is an unincorporated community in Gilchrist County, Florida, United States. It is located on the Suwannee River, approximately 7 miles (11 km) southwest of Bell.

== Geography ==
Wannee is located at 29.719°N 82.941°W, with an elevation of 23 feet (7.0 m).
