= Craggs, Florida =

Unincorporated community in Florida, U.S.

Craggs is an unincorporated community in Gilchrist County, Florida, United States. It is located approximately 12 miles (19 km) northeast of Trenton on State Road 47.

Craggs was once passed through by the Atlantic, Suwannee River and Gulf Railway, which was later acquired by the Seaboard Air Line Railroad, who designated it as their Wannee Subdivision. The line had no station within the community, and was abandoned by CSX during the 1980s, Today, the right-of-way for the former railroad line is occupied by a Gilchrist County solid waste facility on the east side of State Road 47.

== Geography ==
Craggs is located at 29.779°N 82.741°W, its elevation 72 feet (22 m).
