= Sampson City, Florida =

Unincorporated community in Florida, U.S.

Coordinates: 29°55′00″N 82°12′28″W

Sampson City is an unincorporated community southwest of Starke, Bradford County, Florida, United States. It is also known as Sampson and is located near Lake Sampson. The Sampson City Baptist Church and the Sampson City Church of God are located in Sampson City.

== Notable person ==
- Herb Thomas, baseball player
