= Bell, Florida =

- Town
- Town of Bell
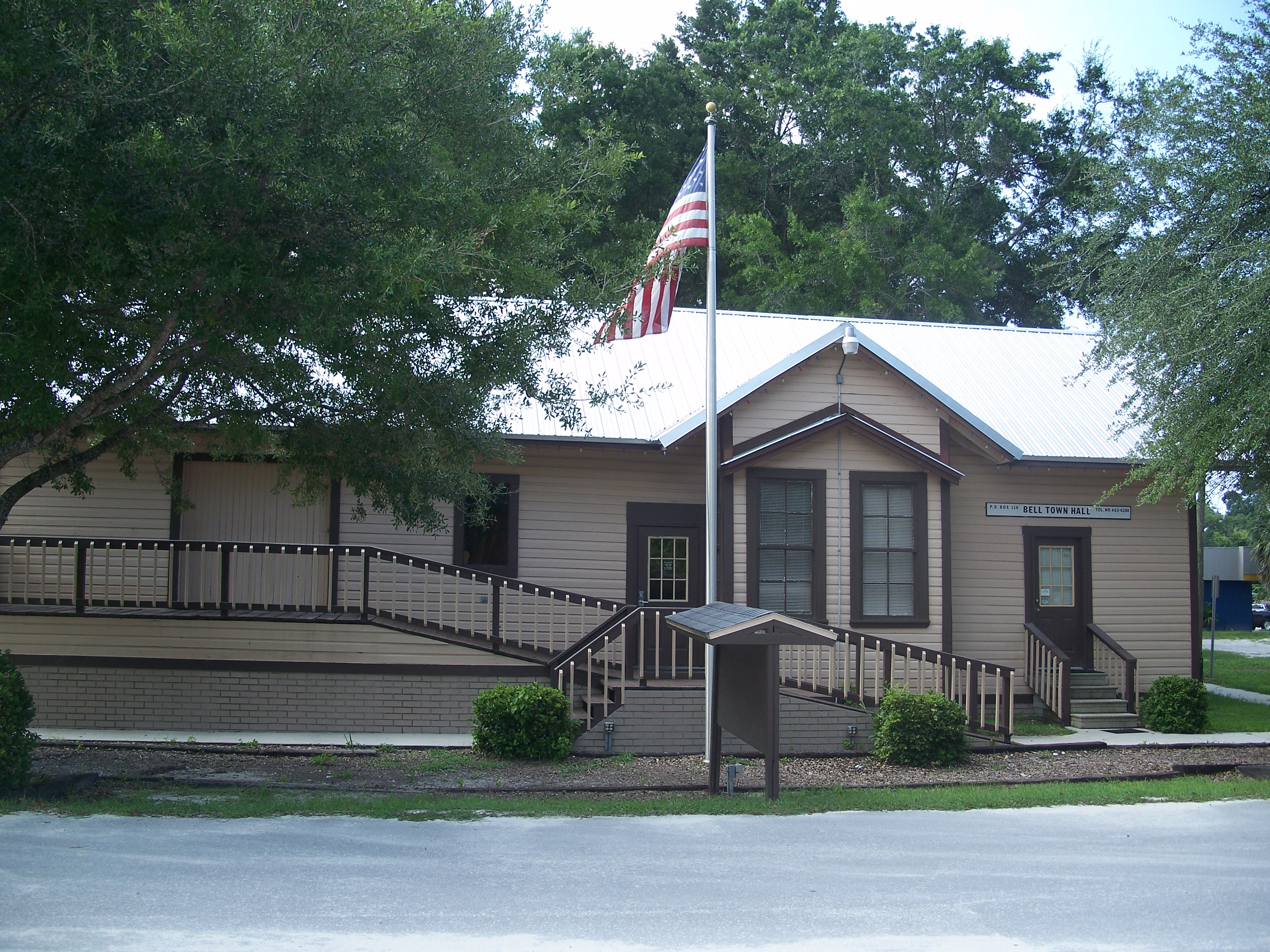
- Bell Town Hall, which originally served as a Seaboard Air Line Railroad train depot.
- Motto: "In God We Trust"
- Location in Gilchrist County and the state of Florida
- Coordinates: 29°45′12″N 82°51′34″W
- Country: United States
- State: Florida
- County: Gilchrist
- Founded: c. Early 1890s
- Incorporated: August 18, 1902
- Reincorporated: 1903

Government
  - Type: Council-Manager
  - Mayor: Sandra Moore
  - Councilors: Michael, Moore, Diana "Katie" Lovett, Christopher "Chris" Sandlin, and Gary Blakenship
  - Town Manager and Town Clerk: Michelle Rose
  - Town Attorney: David M. Lang Jr.

Area
  - Total: 1.64 sq mi (4.24 km^{2})
  - Land: 1.64 sq mi (4.24 km^{2})
  - Water: 0 sq mi (0.00 km^{2})
- Elevation: 66 ft (20 m)

Population (2020)
  - Total: 518
  - Density: 316.3/sq mi (122.11/km^{2})
- Time zone: UTC-5 (Eastern (EST))
  - Summer (DST): UTC-4 (EDT)
- ZIP code: 32619
- Area code: 352
- FIPS code: 12-04975
- GNIS feature ID: 2405231

Bell is a town in Gilchrist County, Florida, United States. The town is situated in the northern part of the county, and located in North Florida. The population was 518 at the 2020 US Census, up from 456 at the 2010 US Census. It is part of the Gainesville, Florida Metropolitan Statistical Area.

== History ==
The town was founded in the 1890s, named after a beauty contest winner, Bell Fletcher. In the early 1900s, a railway was built, passing through the town on its route between Starke and Wannee. A train depot was built circa 1905, and the restored depot building is now the town hall. The Town of Bell was officially incorporated as a municipality on August 18, 1902. It was reincorporated in 1903.

On September 18, 2014, a 51-year-old ex-convict, Don Charles Spirit, shot and murdered his daughter Sarah and her six children. He then committed suicide after police officers responded to the scene of the crime.

== Geography ==
U.S. Route 129 is the town's Main Street; it leads north 18 miles (29 km) to Branford and south 10 miles (16 km) to Trenton, the Gilchrist County seat.

According to the United States Census Bureau, the town has a total area of 1.6 square miles (4.1 km^{2}), all land.

=== Climate ===
The climate in this area is characterized by hot, humid summers and generally mild winters. According to the Köppen climate classification, the Town of Bell has a humid subtropical climate zone (Cfa).

Climate data for Bell, Florida, 1991–2020 normals, extremes 2000–2019
Month	Jan	Feb	Mar	Apr	May	Jun	Jul	Aug	Sep	Oct	Nov	Dec	Year
Record high °F (°C)	81 (27)	86 (30)	89 (32)	92 (33)	104 (40)	100 (38)	100 (38)	98 (37)	96 (36)	93 (34)	87 (31)	84 (29)	104 (40)
Mean daily maximum °F (°C)	64.9 (18.3)	68.4 (20.2)	74.6 (23.7)	79.7 (26.5)	86.1 (30.1)	89.7 (32.1)	89.9 (32.2)	89.7 (32.1)	87.3 (30.7)	80.2 (26.8)	73.1 (22.8)	67.2 (19.6)	79.2 (26.2)
Daily mean °F (°C)	52.5 (11.4)	55.9 (13.3)	61.0 (16.1)	66.5 (19.2)	73.6 (23.1)	79.3 (26.3)	80.3 (26.8)	80.4 (26.9)	77.8 (25.4)	69.3 (20.7)	60.5 (15.8)	54.9 (12.7)	67.7 (19.8)
Mean daily minimum °F (°C)	40.0 (4.4)	43.3 (6.3)	47.4 (8.6)	53.3 (11.8)	61.2 (16.2)	68.8 (20.4)	70.7 (21.5)	71.0 (21.7)	68.4 (20.2)	58.4 (14.7)	48.0 (8.9)	42.6 (5.9)	56.1 (13.4)
Record low °F (°C)	17 (−8)	19 (−7)	21 (−6)	32 (0)	41 (5)	56 (13)	58 (14)	61 (16)	52 (11)	30 (−1)	20 (−7)	17 (−8)	17 (−8)
Average precipitation inches (mm)	4.05 (103)	3.92 (100)	3.66 (93)	2.40 (61)	3.40 (86)	6.57 (167)	7.83 (199)	9.18 (233)	4.92 (125)	3.51 (89)	2.36 (60)	2.56 (65)	54.36 (1,381)
Average precipitation days (≥ 0.01 in)	8.4	7.2	7.1	5.8	6.1	13.0	16.3	16.4	11.0	6.7	5.6	7.5	111.1
Source 1: NOAA
Source 2: XMACIS2

== Demographics ==
Historical population
Census	Pop.	Note	%±
1910	243		—
1920	146		−39.9%
1930	168		15.1%
1940	183		8.9%
1950	108		−41.0%
1960	134		24.1%
1970	227		69.4%
1980	227		0.0%
1990	267		17.6%
2000	349		30.7%
2010	456		30.7%
2020	518		13.6%
U.S. Decennial Census

=== 2010 and 2020 census ===
Bell racial composition (Hispanics excluded from racial categories) (NH = Non-Hispanic)
Race	Pop 2010	Pop 2020	% 2010	% 2020
White (NH)	398	335	87.28%	64.67%
Black or African American (NH)	2	16	0.44%	3.09%
Native American or Alaska Native (NH)	2	4	0.44%	0.77%
Asian (NH)	4	6	0.88%	1.16%
Pacific Islander or Native Hawaiian (NH)	0	2	0.00%	0.39%
Some other race (NH)	0	2	0.00%	0.39%
Two or more races/Multiracial (NH)	1	23	0.22%	4.44%
Hispanic or Latino (any race)	49	130	10.75%	25.10%
Total	456	518		

As of the 2020 United States census, there were 518 people, 191 households, and 130 families residing in the town.

As of the 2010 United States census, there were 456 people, 211 households, and 112 families residing in the town.

=== 2000 census ===
As of the census of 2000, there were 349 people, 125 households, and 91 families residing in the town. The population density was 213.5 inhabitants per square mile (82.4/km^{2}). There were 149 housing units at an average density of 91.2 per square mile (35.2/km^{2}). The racial makeup of the town was 95.99% White, 2.01% African American, 0.29% Native American, 1.43% from other races, and 0.29% from two or more races. Hispanic or Latino of any race were 1.43% of the population.

In 2000, there were 125 households, out of which 43.2% had children under the age of 18 living with them, 52.0% were married couples living together, 16.8% had a female householder with no husband present, and 26.4% were non-families. 21.6% of all households were made up of individuals, and 10.4% had someone living alone who was 65 years of age or older. The average household size was 2.79 and the average family size was 3.21.

In 2000, in the town, the population was spread out, with 30.4% under the age of 18, 10.0% from 18 to 24, 28.7% from 25 to 44, 16.6% from 45 to 64, and 14.3% who were 65 years of age or older. The median age was 34 years. For every 100 females, there were 90.7 males. For every 100 females age 18 and over, there were 84.1 males.

In 2000, the median income for a household in the town was $30,156, and the median income for a family was $30,987. Males had a median income of $21,250 versus $23,125 for females. The per capita income for the town was $11,790. About 13.1% of families and 17.2% of the population were below the poverty line, including 19.4% of those under age 18 and 5.9% of those age 65.

== Education ==
There are several schools that serve the Bell area and are, in turn, served by the Gilchrist County School District.
These schools include:

- Bell Elementary
- Bell Middle/High School
