= Florida Central and Peninsular Railroad =

Historic railroad system

- Florida Central and Peninsular Railroad network
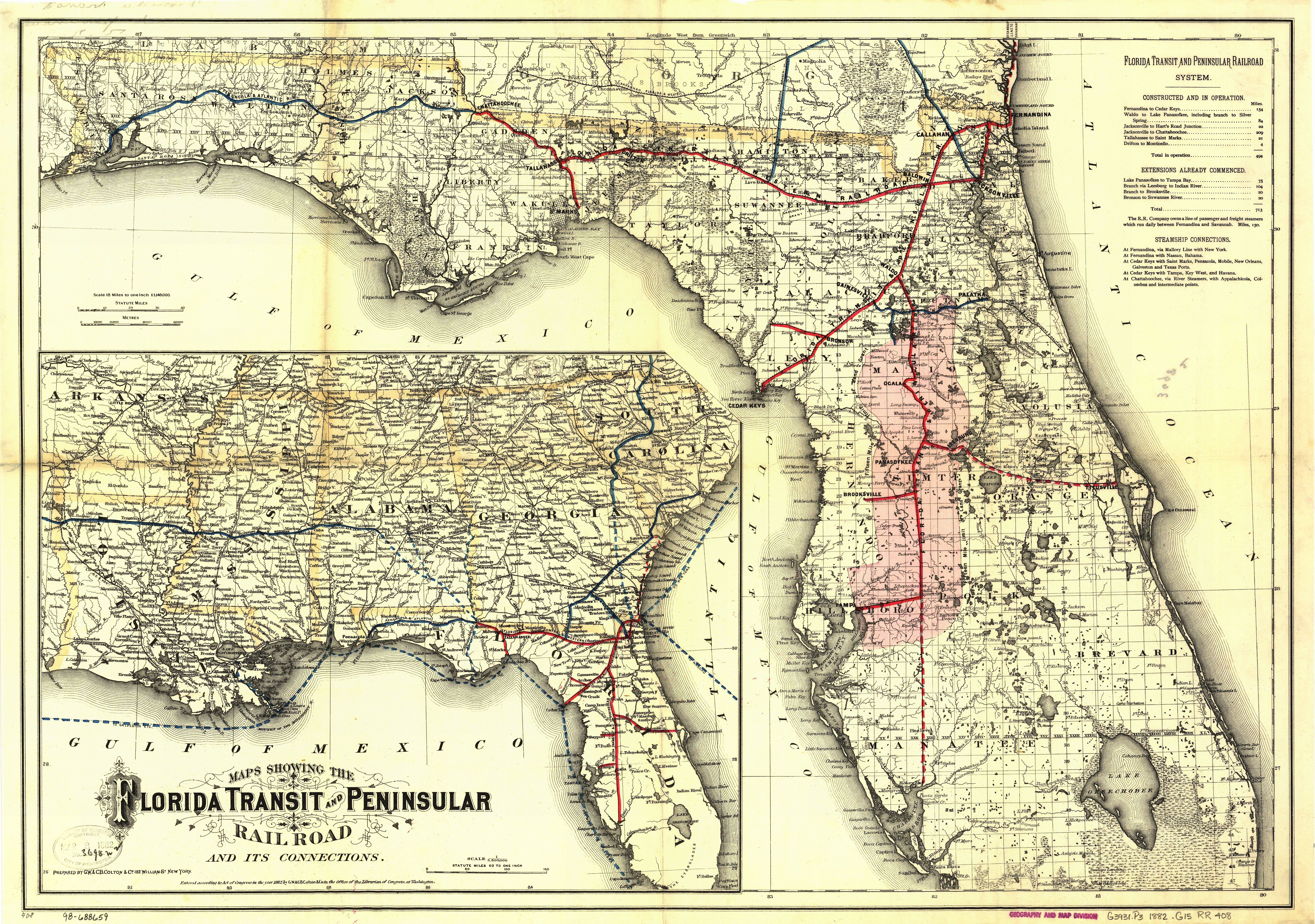
- 1882 map

Overview
- Locale: Florida
- Dates of operation: 1889–1900

Technical
- Track gauge: 4 ft 8 1/2 in (1,435 mm) standard gauge
- Previous gauge: 5 ft (1,524 mm) originally, converted to 4 ft 9 in (1,448 mm) in 1886

The Florida Central and Peninsular Railroad was the final name of a system of railroads throughout Florida, becoming part of the Seaboard Air Line Railway in 1900. The system, including some of the first railroads in Florida, stretched from Jacksonville west through Tallahassee and south to Tampa. Much of the FC&P network is still in service under the ownership of CSX Transportation.

== History ==
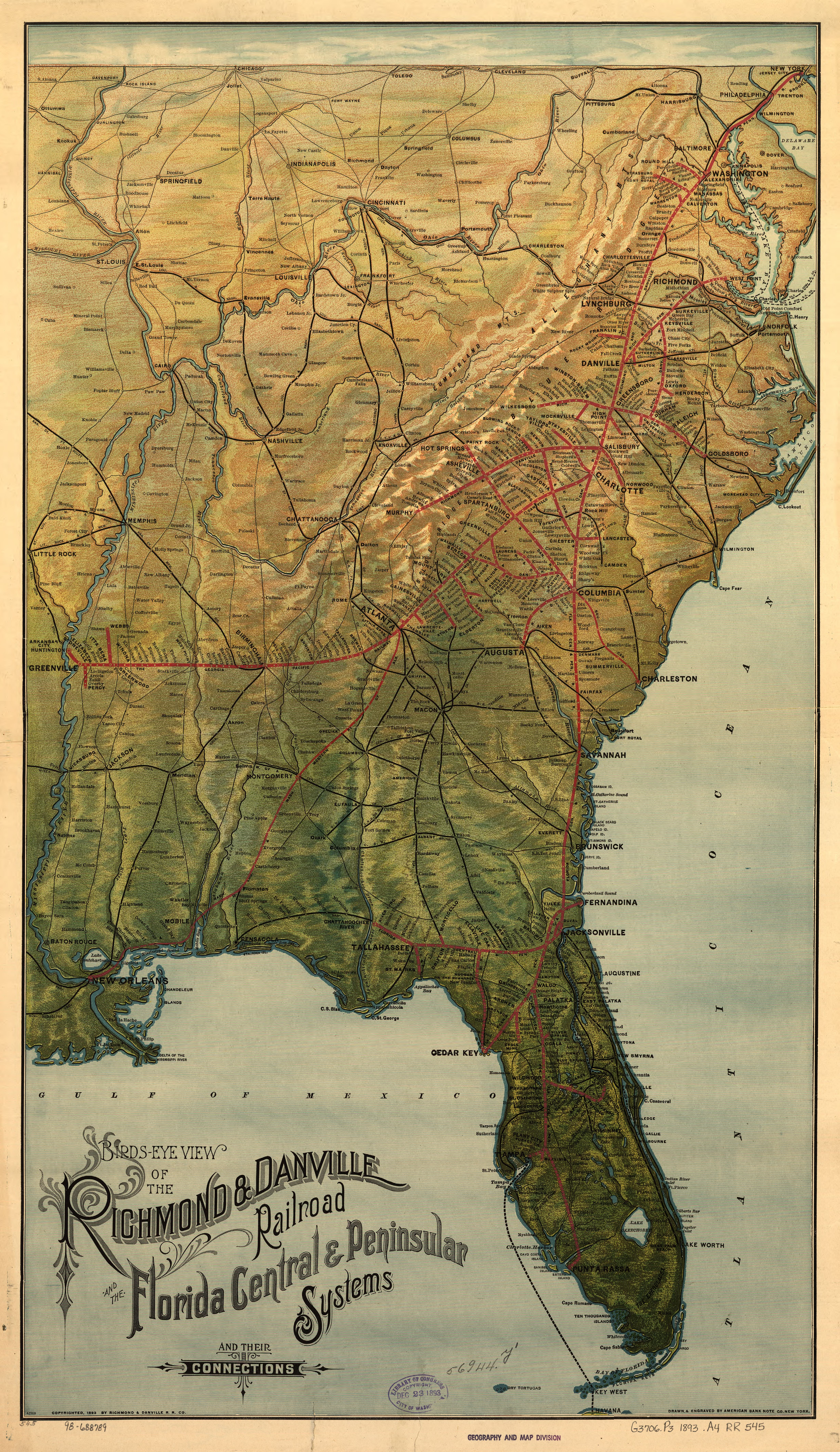
1893 map (also showing the Richmond and Danville Railroad)

The Tallahassee Rail Road was first organized in 1832 as the Leon Railway, changing its name in 1834. It opened in 1837, connecting Tallahassee, Florida to the Gulf of Mexico port of St. Marks, Florida. This was the second steam railroad in Florida, opening just a year after the Lake Wimico and St. Joseph Canal and Railroad.

The Florida, Atlantic and Gulf Central Railroad was chartered January 24, 1851, to build west from Jacksonville, Florida, and construction began in 1857. The Pensacola and Georgia Railroad was chartered in January 1853, to be built east from Pensacola, Florida, but started at Tallahassee. The two lines met at Lake City, Florida in 1860, and the latter also built from Tallahassee west to four miles (6 km) short of Quincy, Florida, stopping in 1863 in the middle of the American Civil War.

In 1855 the Pensacola and Georgia bought the Tallahassee. In 1869 the two merged to form the Jacksonville, Pensacola and Mobile Railroad, which obtained trackage rights over the Florida Central Railroad, the 1868 reorganization of the Florida, Atlantic and Gulf. The railroad eventually was built west to Chattahoochee, Florida, a major junction with the Pensacola and Atlantic Railroad continuing west and the Chattahoochee and East Pass Railroad running northeast. In 1882, Sir Edward Reed purchased the Jacksonville, Pensacola and Mobile, absorbing the Florida Central and reorganizing the two as the Florida Central and Western Railroad.

The Florida Railroad was incorporated January 8, 1853, to build a line across the state, from Fernandina, Florida (north of Jacksonville, Florida) southwest to Cedar Key, Florida. The first train ran in 1861, but the line failed and the company was reorganized in 1866. In 1872 it was reorganized again as the Atlantic, Gulf and West India Transit Company. In 1881, Sir Edward Reed purchased the railroad and reorganized it as the Florida Transit Company, which in 1883 was reorganized again as the Florida Transit and Peninsular Railroad. The Florida Transit and Peninsular operated two subsidiaries, the Peninsula Railroad and Tropical Florida Railroad, organized to build lines respectively from the Florida Transit at Waldo, Florida to Ocala, Florida and beyond to Tampa, Florida.

In 1884–85, Reed merged the Florida Transit and Peninsular Railroad with the Florida Central and Western Railroad, Fernandina and Jacksonville Railroad, and Leesburg and Indian River Railroad as the Florida Railway and Navigation Company, which instantly became the largest railroad system in Florida. The new company was placed in receivership in October 1885, sold at foreclosure and reorganized as the Florida Central and Peninsular Railroad Company in 1886.

On May 1, 1889, the company was reorganized again, as the Florida Central and Peninsular Railway, and on January 16, 1893, the final reorganization produced the Florida Central and Peninsular Railroad, along with a merger of the Florida Northern Railroad (a line from Yulee to Savannah, Georgia that had not yet begun construction). The Seaboard Air Line Railway leased the FC&P on July 1, 1900, and the latter was merged into the former on August 15, 1903. The FC&P tracks from Savannah, Georgia to Tampa, Florida via Jacksonville became part of Seaboard's main line.

Though a series of mergers between 1967 and 1987, the Seaboard became part of CSX Transportation. Much of the former FC&P network remains in service today.

== Routes ==
=== Main Lines (Southern and Western Divisions) ===
By the time the Florida Central and Peninsular Railroad reached its greatest extent in 1893, it essentially had two main lines. One of the main lines (the Western Division) extended from Jacksonville west to Tallahassee and Chattahoochee, where it connected to the Pensacola and Atlantic Railroad (a subsidiary of the Louisville and Nashville Railroad). The other main line (the Southern Division) was what was previously the Florida Railroad extending from Fernandina Beach to Cedar Key. These two main lines intersected at Baldwin Junction just west of Jacksonville. The routes continued in operation after Seaboard acquired the lines in 1900, although Seaboard designated the route to Tampa as the main line south of Waldo instead of the route to Cedar Key.

Seaboard abandoned the former Southern Division from Archer to Cedar Key in 1932. The line was abandoned between Callahan and Yulee in 1954. The line from Archer to Waldo was removed in the late 1980s. Today, State Road 24 runs along much of the former right of way of the route between Waldo and Cedar Key. The Waldo Road Greenway also runs along the former right of way between Gainesville and Waldo. South of Baldwin, it is part of CSX's S Line.

FC&P's Southern Division is still active and in service as the following:

- First Coast Railroad (Fernandina Beach to Yulee)
- CSX (Callahan to Waldo)
  - Callahan Subdivision (Callahan to Baldwin Junction)
  - Wildwood Subdivision (Baldwin to Waldo)

The Western Division remains operates as the following routes:

- CSX Jacksonville Terminal Subdivision (Jacksonville to Baldwin)
- Florida Gulf & Atlantic Railroad (Baldwin to Chattahoochee)

=== Tampa Division ===
The Tampa Division ran from the Fernandina-Cedar Key line at Waldo south to Tampa. This had been chartered as the Peninsula Railroad north of Ocala and the Tropical Florida Railroad south of Ocala. After the Seaboard acquisition, this route became the southernmost segment of their main line. It subsequently became part of CSX's S Line.

While mostly intact, a short 16-mile segment of the S Line has been abandoned between Lacoochee and Zephyrhills, where the line now briefly detours along a former Atlantic Coast Line route (using former South Florida Railroad and Tampa and Thonotosassa Railroad trackage). Despite not being part of the original line, this former Atlantic Coast Line segment is considered to be an unofficial part of the S Line since it carries all S Line traffic.

The Tampa Division now operates as the following routes on the S Line:

- Wildwood Subdivision (Waldo to Lacoochee)
- Yeoman Subdivision (Zephyrhills to east of Tampa)
- Tampa Terminal Subdivision (east of Tampa to Gary)

=== Northern Division ===
The Fernandina and Jacksonville Railroad was organized in 1874 and opened in 1881, connecting Jacksonville north to the Southern Division at Yulee. It was consolidated into the Florida Railway and Navigation Company in 1885.

The South Bound Railroad was organized in 1887 and completed in 1891, connecting Columbia, South Carolina to Savannah, Georgia. The FC&P leased it in 1893. In 1892 the Florida Northern Railroad was chartered by the FC&P to continue the Fernandina and Jacksonville Railroad north into Georgia, where the FC&P continued the line to Savannah. This opened in 1894, forming a continuous line from Jacksonville to Columbia. In 1899 and 1900, the South Bound Railroad was extended north to Camden, South Carolina to meet the Seaboard Air Line Railway's Chesterfield and Kershaw Railroad. The Northern Division became part of the Seaboard main line after the Seaboard acquisition.

In 1925, the Gross Cutoff was built by Seaboard from the Northern Division near the Florida/Georgia state line southwest to the Southern Division at Callahan.

The Northern Division remains today in segments. The abandoned segment within Jacksonville is now the S-Line Urban Greenway.

After the Seaboard Coast Line became the CSX Corporation in the 1980s, CSX abandoned the S Line between Riceboro, Georgia (just southwest of Savannah) and Bladen, Georgia in 1986. Track between Bladen and Seals was removed in 1990.

The Northern Division is now the following routes:

- CSX (Camden, South Carolina to Savannah, Georgia)
  - Hamlet Subdivision (Camden, South Carolina to Columbia, South Carolina)
  - Columbia Subdivision (Columbia to Savannah, Georgia)
  - Savannah Subdivision West Route (within Savannah)
- Riceboro Southern Railway (Ogechee, Georgia to Riceboro, Georgia)
- First Coast Railroad (Seals, Georgia to Yulee, Florida)
- CSX Kingsland Subdivision (Yulee to Jacksonville)

=== Orlando Division ===
The Leesburg and Indian River Railroad was incorporated in 1884 and merged into the Florida Railway and Navigation Company in 1885. It built a line from the Tampa Division at Wildwood east to Tavares, with plans to continue east to Titusville. That extension was not built, but pieces were built by other companies.

The Tavares, Orlando and Atlantic Railroad was incorporated in 1883, and built an extension of line from Tavares to Orlando. The FC&P leased it in 1891.

The Orlando and Winter Park Railway was incorporated in 1886 and extended the line from Orlando to Winter Park. The Osceola and Lake Jesup Railway, incorporated 1888, continued the line past Oviedo to Lake Charm. In 1891 the two companies merged into the East Florida and Atlantic Railroad, which was leased by the FC&P in 1892. In the line's early days, passenger trains served the historic Church Street Station in Orlando, which belonged to the South Florida Railroad. Trains turned onto the South Florida Railroad (which became the main line of the Atlantic Coast Line Railroad, the Seaboard Air Line's competitor) in Downtown Orlando just north of the station. In 1896, the FC&P built its own Orlando station.

The line west of Orlando remained intact under Seaboard and its successors until the 1970s when tracks were removed between Leesburg and Tavares. Since 1986, the remaining line from Tavares to Orlando has been operated by the Florida Central Railroad, a short line that was run by the Pinsly Railroad Company from 1986 to 2019 and is now operated by Regional Rail, LLC. The Florida Midland Railroad, another Pinsly-operated short line, operated the segment from Wildwood to Leesburg from 1987 until 2005, when most of that end of the line was abandoned. All that remains on the Wildwood end is a short wye which CSX uses to turn locomotives from Wildwood Yard.

East of Orlando, the abandoned right of way is now the Cady Way Trail and the southern extension of the Cross Seminole Trail.

=== Other Branches ===
Monticello

The Monticello Branch ran from the Western Division at Drifton north to Monticello.

Amelia Beach

The Fernandina and Amelia Beach Railway was organized in 1883 to run from Fernandina at the end of the Southern Division south to Amelia Beach. The FC&P leased it in 1891, and it was abandoned around 1900.

Wannee

The Wannee Branch was originally part of the Atlantic, Suwannee River and Gulf Railway. It branched off the Southern Division at Starke and headed west to Wannee. Construction of the line began in 1863. The line was bought by the FC&P in 1899 and it was completed to Wannee in 1902. The branch remains in service as part of CSX's Brooker Subdivision from Starke to a point just west of LaCrosse. The branch's connection with the main line is still known as Wannee Junction.

Early Bird

The branch to Early Bird was built in 1890 and branched off the Southern Division in Archer. The line gained more prominence in the Seaboard era. Seaboard extended the branch south through Dunnellon and Hernando to Inverness in 1911. The Brooksville and Inverness Railway, a Seaboard subsidiary, extended it further south to Brooksville in 1925 to connect with the Tampa Northern Railroad. This created an alternate route into Tampa, which the Seaboard Air Line designated as the Brooksville Subdivision. Much of this line was removed in the late 1970s.

Silver Springs

The short Silver Springs branch from Ocala east to Silver Springs was built along with the Tampa Division. The Seaboard Air Line later leased this branch to the Ocala Northern Railroad in 1909. The Ocala Northern extended the line to Palatka by 1912. The Ocala Northern was reorganized as the Ocklawaha Valley Railroad in 1915, but the line was abandoned by 1922.

Lake Weir

The Lake Weir Branch ran from Summerfield east to South Lake Weir, and was built along with the Tampa Division.

Sumterville

The short Sumterville branch from Sumterville Junction to Sumterville was built with the Tampa Division.

St. Marks

The St. Mark's branch was built by the Tallahassee Railroad ran from Tallahassee south. It was one of the first operating railroads in Florida. It's become the longest-operating railroad in Florida at 147 years. It was abandoned in 1983. The Florida Park Service currently maintains it as the Tallahassee-St. Marks Historic Railroad State Trail.

Whitehall

== Historic stations ==
Southern Division

Milepost	City/Location	Station	Connections and notes
SMA 47.2	Fernandina	Fernandina	
	O'Neill	O'Neill	
		Buena Vista	
		Lofton	
	Yulee	Hart's Road	
SMA 35.1	Yulee	Yulee	originally Hart's Road Junction junction with Northern Division
		Hero	
	Italia	Italia	
		Nassau	
SM 20.0	Callahan	Callahan	junction with: East Florida Railway (ACL); Gross Cutoff (SAL)
SM 12.3	Crawford	Crawford	junction with Atlantic, Valdosta and Western Railway (GSF/SOU)
	Verdie	Verdie	
	Ingle	Ingle	
		St. Mary's	
	Bryceville	Bryceville	
SM 0.0; S 653.0	Baldwin	Baldwin	junction with: Western Division; Jacksonville and Southwestern Railroad (ACL)
S 656.5		Fiftone	
S 659.0		Maxville	
S 661.4		Hugh	
S 665.7		Highland	
		Trail Ridge	
S 669.3	Lawtey	Lawtey	
		Burrine's	
S 672.1		Saxton	
		Temple	
S 678.4	Starke	Starke	
S 679.1	Starke	Wannee Junction	junction with Wannee Branch
		Thurston	
S 684.6	Hampton	Hampton	junction with Georgia Southern and Florida Railway (SOU)
S 690.0	Waldo	Waldo	junction with Tampa Division
		Millicans	
SR 697.2		Fairbanks	
		Dowd's	
		Nedra	
SR 704.0	Gainesville	Gainesville	junction with: Live Oak, Tampa and Charlotte Harbor Railroad (ACL); Florida Southern Railway (ACL); Gainesville and Gulf Railroad (SAL)
		Daysville	
		Hammock Ridge	
		Arredondo	
SR 710.8		Kanapaha	
		Peach Orchard	
		Palmer	
SR 718.4	Archer	Archer	junction with Early Bird Branch
		Venables	
		Albion	
		Meredith	
727.7	Bronson	Bronson	
		Lennon	
739.5	Otter Creek	Otter Creek	Junction with Perry Cutoff (ACL)
		Ellzey	
		Emett	
		Wylly	
	Rosewood	Rosewood	
		Hilton	
	Sumner	Sumner	
		Lukens	
760.9	Cedar Key	Cedar Key	

Tampa Division

Milepost	City/Location	Station	Connections and notes
S 690.0	Waldo	Waldo	junction with Southern Division
S 696.6		Orange Heights	
		Dixie	
S 700.1	Campville	Campville	
S 703.3	Hawthorne	Hawthorne	junction with Florida Southern Railway Palatka Branch (ACL)
S 712.3	Lochloosa	Lochloosa	
S 714.5	Island Grove	Island Grove	
S 716.9	Citra	Citra	
		Meadows	
S 722.4	Sparr	Sparr	
S 725.8	Anthony	Anthony	
S 728.2		Oak	
S 731.5	Ocala	Silver Springs Junction	junction with Silver Springs Branch
	Silver Springs	Silver Springs	located on Silver Springs Branch junction with Ocklawaha Valley Railroad
S 735.3	Ocala	Ocala	replaced by Ocala Union Station in 1917 junction with: Florida Southern Railway (ACL); Silver Springs, Ocala and Gulf Railroad (ACL)
S 743.5		Santos	
S 747.1	Belleview	Belleview	
S 752.0	Summerfield	Summerfield	junction with Lake Weir Branch
		Lake Weir	located on Lake Weir Branch
S 753.7		Dallas	
S 756.8	Oxford	Oxford	
S 761.5	Wildwood	Wildwood	junction with Orlando Division
S 766.1	Coleman	Coleman	junction with Seaboard Air Line Railroad Miami Subdivision
S 766.7		Warnell	
S 770.4	Panasoffkee	Panasoffkee	
S 771.0		Ekal	also known as Sumterville Junction junction with Sumterville Branch
		Sumterville	located on Sumterville Branch
		Edenfield	
S 775.1	Bushnell	Bushnell	
S 778.9	St. Catherine	St. Catherine	junction with Florida Southern Railway (ACL)
S 783.2		Rerdell	
S 784.2		Terrell	
S 791.2	Lacoochee	Lacoochee	junction with Orange Belt Railway (ACL)
S 791.9	Trilacoochee, Florida	Owensboro Junction	junction with South Florida Railroad Pemberton Ferry Branch (ACL)
S 797.9	Dade City	Dade City	
		Pasadena	
		Greer	
		Phelps	
S 808.0	Zephyrhills	Zephyrhills	junction with Atlantic Coast Line Railroad Vitis–Tampa Line
S 811.4	Crystal Springs	Crystal Springs	
S 818.5	Knights	Knights	
S 823.1	Plant City	Plant City	replaced by Plant City Union Depot in 1909 junction with: South Florida Railroad (ACL); Plant City, Arcadia, and Gulf Railroad (SAL)
S 827.4	Turkey Creek	Turkey Creek	junction with Seaboard Air Line Railroad Sarasota Subdivision
S 829.5	Sydney	Sydney	
S 832.5	Valrico	Valrico	junction with Valrico Cutoff (SAL)
S 834.8	Brandon	Brandon	
S 835.8		Limona	
	Tampa	South Tampa	
S 840.9	Tampa	Yeoman	
S 843.5	Tampa	Tampa Northern Junction	later known as Gary junction with Tampa Northern Railroad (SAL)
S 844.9	Tampa	Tampa	original station was located at Franklin and Whiting Streets replaced by Tampa Union Station in 1912
	Tampa	Seddon Island Terminal	Freight terminal built by the Seaboard Air Line in 1909

Western Division

Milepost	City/Location	Station	Connections and notes
SP 635.4	Jacksonville	Jacksonville	junction with: Northern Division; East Florida Railway (ACL); Jacksonville, Tampa and Key West Railway (ACL); Atlantic, Valdosta and Western Railway (GSF/SOU); Florida East Coast Railway
	Jacksonville	West Jacksonville	
SP 641.6		Marietta	
SP 652.5	Baldwin	Baldwin	junction with Southern Division
SP 656.3		Mattox	junction with Jacksonville and Southwestern Railroad (ACL)
SP 661.4	Macclenny	Macclenny	known as Darbyville prior to 1890
SP 663.8	Glen St. Mary	Glen St. Mary	
		Drake	
		Taliaferros Junction	
SP 670.7	Sanderson	Sanderson	
		Woodstock	
		Mann's Spur	
SP 680.6	Olustee	Olustee	
SP 685.1		Mount Carrie	
SP 690.7	Watertown	Watertown	
SP 693.1	Lake City	Lake City	junction with: Live Oak, Tampa and Charlotte Harbor Railroad Lake City Branch (ACL); Georgia Southern and Florida Railway (SOU)
		Ogden	
		McKinley	
SP 704.5	Wellborn	Wellborn	
SP 709.9	Houston	Houston	
SP 715.3	Live Oak	Live Oak	junction with: Live Oak and Rowland's Bluff Railroad (ACL); Live Oak, Tampa and Charlotte Harbor Railroad (ACL)
SP 721.5		Dickert	
	Falmouth	Falmouth	
SP 728.7	Ellaville	Ellaville	
SP 736.3	Lee	Lee	
		West Farm	
SP 743.7	Madison	Madison	
		Champaign	
SP 757.4	Greenville	Greenville	
SP 764.9	Aucilla	Aucilla	
SP 772.3	Drifton	Drifton	junction with: Monticello Branch; Perry Cutoff (ACL)
SPB 776.5	Monticello	Monticello	located on Monticello Branch
		Braswell	
SP 781.2	Lloyd	Lloyd	
		Capitola	
SP 787.8	Chaires	Chaires	
SP 799.3	Tallahassee	Tallahassee	junction with: St. Marks Branch; Carrabelle, Tallahassee & Georgia Railroad (GF&A/SAL)
		Ocklocknee	
		Lawrence	
SP 811.4	Midway	Midway	
SP 823.3	Quincy	Quincy	
SP 828.7	Gretna	Gretna	
SP 832.0	Mount Pleasant	Mount Pleasant	
		Jamieson	
	Chattahoochee	Chattahoochee	
SP 841.9	Chattahoochee	River Junction	junction with: Pensacola and Atlantic Railroad (L&N); Apalachicola Northern Railroad; Chattahoochee and East Pass Railroad (SF&W/ACL)

Orlando Division

Milepost	City/Location	Station	Connections and notes
ST 761.2	Wildwood	Wildwood	junction with Tampa Division
	Orange Home	Orange Home	
		Bamboo	
		Spink's	
ST 768.9		Whitney	
ST 770.4		Montclair	
ST 772.8	Leesburg	Leesburg	junction with: Florida Southern Railway (ACL); St. Johns and Lake Eustis Railway (ACL)
		Sunnyside	
		Sadie	
		El Dorado	
		Eustis Transfer	
ST 783.2	Tavares	Tavares	junction with St. Johns and Lake Eustis Railway (ACL)
ST 786.8		Ellsworth	
ST 790.8		Lake Jem	
		Gainesboro	
ST 794.7	Zellwood	Zellwood	
ST 796.2		McDonald	
ST 798.7	Plymouth	Plymouth	
ST 802.0	Apopka	Apopka	junction with Florida Midland Railway (ACL)
		Piedmont	
ST 805.7		Toronto	junction with Orange Belt Railway (ACL)
ST 807.7	Lockhart	Lockhart	
		Wekiva	
ST 811.4	Fairvilla	Fairvilla	
		Livingston	
ST 812.1		Modello Park	
ST 815.0	Orlando	Orlando	Built in 1896. FC&P trains previously used Church Street Station. junction with South Florida Railroad (ACL)
		Fair Oaks	
		Rowena	
		Lake Mabel	
		Bonnie Burn	
		College Station	
ST 819.4	Winter Park	Winter Park	
ST 823.8		Lakemont	
		Lake Howell	
ST 822.0		Aloma	
ST 823.8	Goldenrod	Goldenrod	
		Bertha	
		Gabriella	
	Slavia	Slavia	
ST 830.1	Oviedo	Oviedo	junction with Sanford and Indian River Railroad (SFRR/ACL)
ST 831.0		Lake Charm	

Northern Division

State	Milepost	City/Location	Station	Connections and notes
For stations north of Savannah, see South Bound Railroad
GA	S 501.8	Savannah	Savannah	junction with: Savannah, Florida and Western Railway (ACL); Georgia and Alabama Railway (SAL)
GA			Anderson	
GA	S 512.4		Burroughs	junction with Savannah, Florida and Western Railway (ACL)
GA	S 514.4		Ogechee	
GA	S 515.6	Richmond Hill	Richmond Hill	
GA	S 522.1	Limerick	Limerick	
GA	S 527.2	Midway	Midway	also known as Dorchester
GA			Gibson	
GA	S 529.1	Riceboro	Riceboro	
GA	S 534.0		Lecount	
GA	S 537.1		Jones	
GA	S 538.1		Brickston	
GA	S 540.1	Warsaw	Warsaw	
GA	S 544.1	Townsend	Townsend	
GA	S 550.4		Cox	
GA	S 556.8		Everett	junction with Macon and Brunswick Railroad (SOU)
GA			Ford	
GA	S 564.4		Thalmann	
GA	S 568.4		Bladen	junction with Brunswick and Western Railroad (ACL)
GA	S 573.8		Hayner	
GA	S 575.5		Glencoe	
GA	S 578.3		Waverly	
GA	S 582.6		White Oak	
GA	S 587.7	Woodbine	Woodbine	
GA	S 591.2		Colesburg	
GA	S 593.4	Seals	Seals	
GA	S 598.9	Kingsland	Kingsland	junction with St. Mary's Railroad
FL	S 605.4		Gross	junction with Gross Cutoff (SAL)
FL	S 609.6	Becker	Becker	
FL	S 613.5	Yulee	Yulee	junction with Southern Division
FL	S 614.2		Hedges	
FL	S 619.1		Tisonia	
FL	S 621.1		Duval	
FL	S 623.3		Broward	
FL	S 629.5	Jacksonville	Panama Park	junction with Jacksonville and Southwestern Railroad (ACL)
FL	S 638.0	Jacksonville	Jacksonville	junction with: Western Division; East Florida Railway (ACL); Jacksonville, Tampa and Key West Railway (ACL); Atlantic, Valdosta and Western Railway (GSF/SOU); Florida East Coast Railway
