= Florida Railroad =

Mid-19th-century railroad in Florida, US

Overview
- Locale: Florida
- Dates of operation: 1858–1883
- Successor: Florida Central and Peninsular Railroad; Seaboard Air Line Railroad

Technical
- Track gauge: 4 ft 8 1/2 in (1,435 mm) standard gauge
- Previous gauge: 5 ft (1,524 mm)

The Florida Railroad was the first railroad to connect the east and west coasts of Florida, running from Fernandina to Cedar Key. The line later became part of the Seaboard Air Line Railroad, and, where still in use, is operated by CSX Transportation and the First Coast Railroad. The highway corridor of SR 24, US 301, and SR A1A/SR 200 closely parallels the former Florida Railroad.

== History ==
=== Construction and early years ===
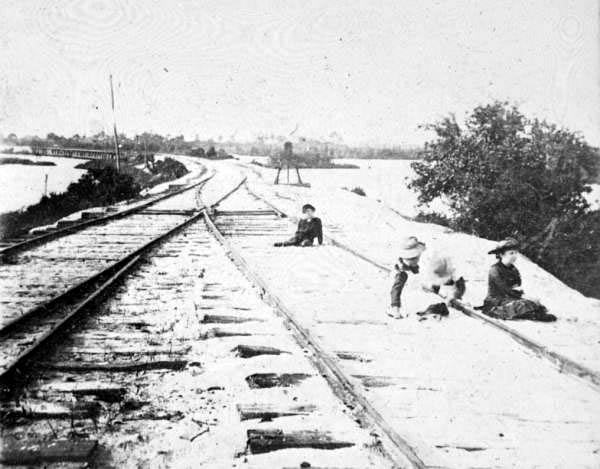
Tracks on Cedar Key

The shipping route between the east coast and gulf coast of the United States passes through the Straits of Florida, close to the Florida Reef that lies just off the Florida Keys. Prior to the 20th century many ships were wrecked around the southern end of the Florida peninsula. A railroad across the northern end of the Florida peninsula would allow cargoes from ships in the Gulf of Mexico to be transferred to ships in the Atlantic Ocean, and vice versa, without the risk of passage through the Straits of Florida, while cutting 800 miles off the trip.

In 1842 the United States Congress commissioned a survey of a route for a railroad between the St. Mary's River and Cedar Key in the Territory of Florida. In 1853 the Florida Legislature chartered the Florida Railroad to build a 5 ft (1,524 mm) gauge rail line from Fernandina (near the mouth of the St. Mary's River) to Tampa, Florida, with a branch to Cedar Key. The president and chief stockholder of the Florida Railroad was U.S. Senator David Levy Yulee. Yulee decided to complete the line to Cedar Key first, leaving the connection to Tampa for later. Construction started in Fernandina in 1855. By 1858 the rail line was open between Fernandina and Starke, but the Panic of 1857 had left the railroad on the edge of bankruptcy. Yulee had to surrender a majority interest in the railroad to a northern investment syndicate headed by Edward Dickerson to save the company. The line was completed to Gainesville in 1859 and Cedar Key in 1861. Other towns served by the railroad included Callahan, Baldwin, Waldo and Archer. At 156 miles in length, it was the longest railroad to be completed in Florida before the start of the American Civil War.

The Florida Railroad was adversely affected by the Civil War. The USS Hatteras raided Cedar Key in January 1862, destroying the railroad's rolling stock and buildings. In March 1862 a Union squadron seized Fernandina. Shells fired by the USS Ottawa damaged the last train leaving Fernandina, killing or injuring several passengers, and almost killing Senator Yulee. In 1864, the Confederate States Army pulled up rails from the Florida Railroad to use on a new rail line from Live Oak, Florida to Lawton, Georgia (now known as DuPont). Union forces had also destroyed 30 miles of track leading from Cedar Key.

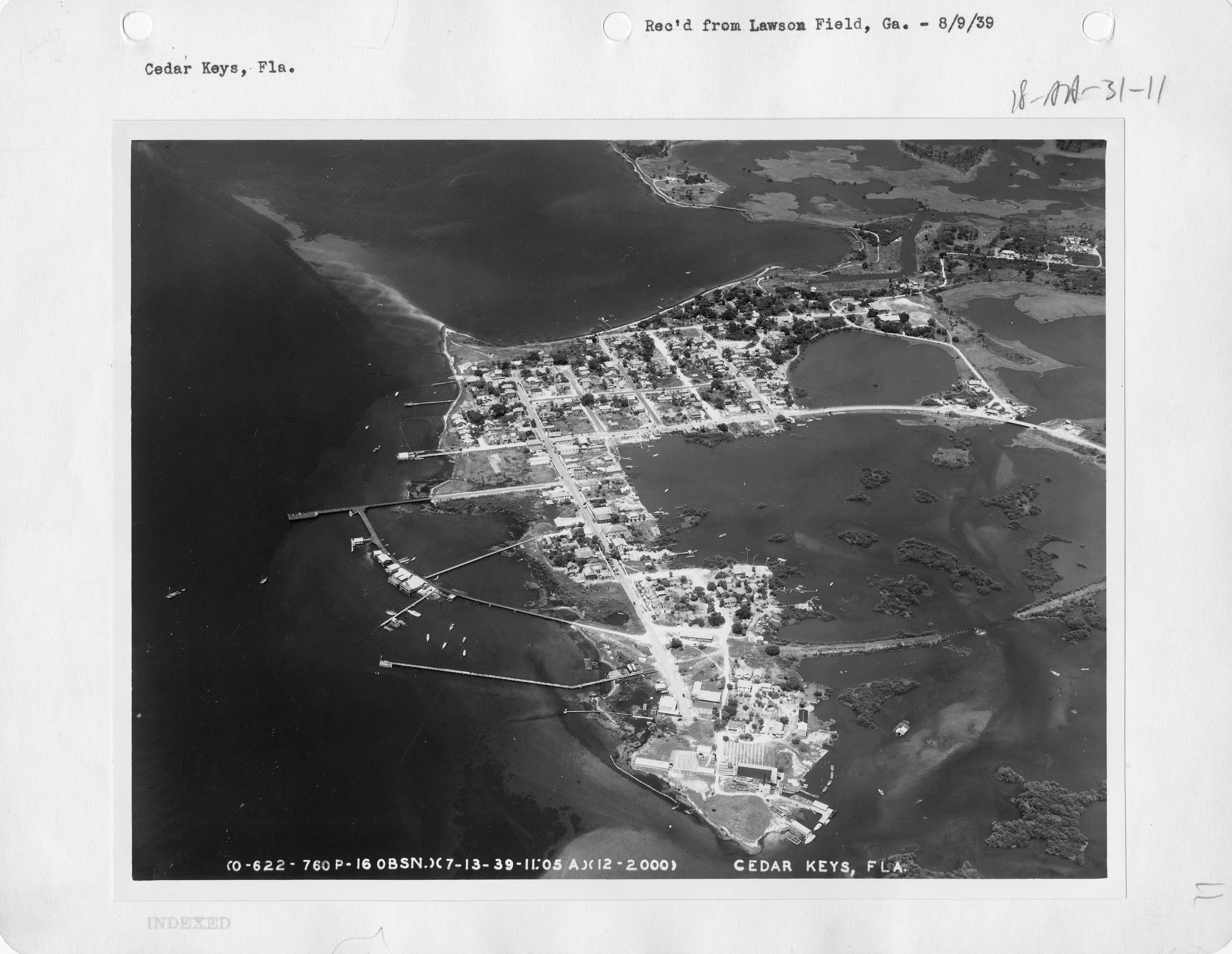
1939 image of Cedar Key showing the Florida Railroad's former right of way and trestle remnants

The Dickerson syndicate resumed operation of the Florida Railroad after the war, but with much of the railroad's equipment, facilities and track destroyed or seized, the company did not do well, and defaulted on its bonds to the Internal Improvement Fund in 1866. The railroad was auctioned off, and bought back by the Dickerson syndicate for twenty percent of the original value of the bonds. In 1872 the Florida Railroad was reorganized as the Atlantic, Gulf and West India Transit Company, still under the control of the Dickerson syndicate. The newly reorganized company began construction of the long-promised line to Tampa through subsidiary companies: the Peninsular Railroad operated the line from the connection with the Florida Railroad at Waldo to Ocala and Silver Springs, while the Tropical Florida Railroad ran from Ocala to Wildwood. In the meantime, the Atlantic, Gulf and West India Transit Company had leased the Fernandina and Jacksonville Railroad, providing a connection from its tracks at Hart's Road (later Yulee, Florida) to Jacksonville, Florida. Due to financial difficulties, the Atlantic, Gulf and West India Transit Company was reorganized as the Florida Transit Company in 1881, under the control of Sir Edward James Reed. The company was restructured again as the Florida Transit and Peninsular Railroad in 1883.

The Florida Transit and Peninsular Railroad was merged with the Florida Central and Western Railroad, Fernandina and Jacksonville Railroad, and Leesburg and Indian River Railroad in 1884–85 to form the Florida Railway and Navigation Company. A year later, the company was reorganized as the Florida Central and Peninsular Railroad (FC&P). In 1890, the FC&P built a branch from the former Florida Railroad at Archer south to serve phosphate mines in Early Bird.

In 1900, a year after purchasing the majority of FC&P stock, the newly organized Seaboard Air Line Railway leased the FC&P and, in 1903, acquired it outright.

=== Seaboard Air Line ownership ===
Once under the ownership of the Seaboard Air Line, the Florida Railroad north of Waldo was classified as part of their Ocala District with the segment from Baldwin to Waldo becoming part of the company's main line. Track from Waldo to Cedar Key was known as the Cedar Key Branch. In 1911, Seaboard Air Line extended the branch from Early Bird south to Inverness.

In the 1920s, the Seaboard made additional improvements to the former Florida Railroad. In 1925, Seaboard extended the Inverness Branch south to Brooksville connecting it to the former Tampa Northern Railroad. This created an additional freight route for the company from northern Florida to Tampa. Seaboard also built the Gross Cutoff from the former Florida Railroad at Callahan northeast to the main line at Gross the same year. Upon completion of these improvements, the Seaboard Air Line classified the former Florida Railroad from Fernandina to Callahan as the Fernandina Subdivision while track from Callahan to Baldwin became the Gross Subdivision. Track from Waldo to Archer and Early Bird along with the Seaboard-built route to Tampa would be known as the Brooksville Subdivision while track from Archer to Cedar Key became the Cedar Key Subdivision.

Seaboard abandoned the Cedar Key Subdivision in 1932. The Fernandina Subdivision was abandoned between Callahan and Yulee in 1954.

=== Later years ===
In 1967, the Seaboard Air Line merged with their long-time rival, the Atlantic Coast Line Railroad (ACL). After the merger was complete, the company was named the Seaboard Coast Line Railroad (SCL). SCL abandoned the remaining Florida Railroad southwest of Waldo in the 1970s. In 1980, the Seaboard Coast Line's parent company merged with the Chessie System, creating the CSX Corporation. The CSX Corporation initially operated the Chessie and Seaboard Systems separately until 1986, when they were merged into CSX Transportation.

== Current conditions ==
Segments of the former Florida Railroad are still in service. Since 2005, track from Fernandina Beach to Yulee is now operated by the First Coast Railroad. Track from Callahan to Waldo is still owned by CSX and is now the Callahan Subdivision from Callahan to Baldwin, and the S Line (Wildwood Subdivision) from Baldwin to Waldo. Today, State Road 24 runs along much of the former right of way of the route between Waldo and Cedar Key. The Waldo Road Greenway also runs along the former right of way between Gainesville and Waldo.

== Historic Stations ==
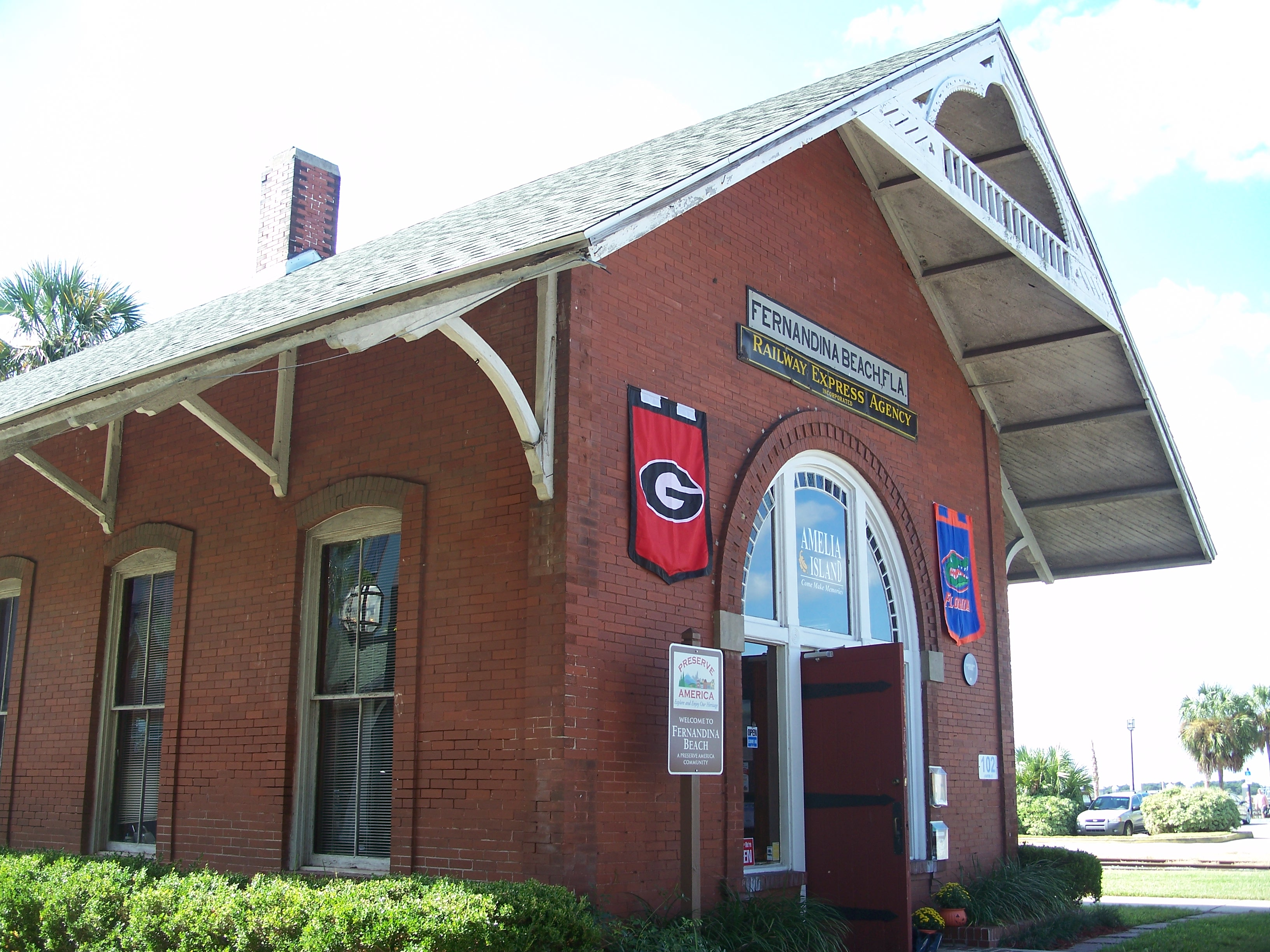
Fernandina Beach's original Florida Railroad Station, now the Amelia Island Visitor Center.

| Miles from Fernandina | City/Location | Station | Connections and notes |
|---|---|---|---|
| 0.0 | Fernandina | Fernandina | |
| 6.1 | O'Neill | O'Neill | |
| 7.0 | | Buena Vista | |
| 8.6 | | Lofton | |
| 11.0 | Yulee | Hart's Road | |
| 12.1 | Yulee | Yulee | originally Hart's Road Junction junction with Florida Central and Peninsular Railroad Northern Division (SAL) |
| 15.4 | | Hero | |
| 19.1 | Italia | Italia | |
| 25.7 | | Nassau | |
| 27.2 | Callahan | Callahan | junction with: East Florida Railway (ACL); Gross Cutoff (SAL) |
| 31.8 | Crawford | Crawford | junction with Atlantic, Valdosta and Western Railway (GSF/SOU) |
| 36.8 | Verdie | Verdie | |
| 38.7 | Ingle | Ingle | |
| 40.0 | | St. Mary's | |
| 41.1 | Bryceville | Bryceville | |
| 47.3 | Baldwin | Baldwin | junction with: Florida Central and Western Railroad (FC&P/SAL); Jacksonville and Southwestern Railroad (ACL) |
| 50.8 | | Fiftone | |
| 54.9 | | Maxville | |
| 57.3 | | Hugh | |
| 61.3 | | Highland | |
| 62.4 | | Trail Ridge | |
| 66.3 | Lawtey | Lawtey | |
| 68.4 | | Burrine's | |
| 69.1 | | Saxton | |
| 71.4 | | Temple | |
| 73.2 | Starke | Starke | |
| 73.9 | Starke | Wannee Junction | junction with Atlantic, Suwannee River and Gulf Railway (SAL) |
| 77.4 | | Thurston | |
| 79.4 | Hampton | Hampton | junction with Georgia Southern and Florida Railway (SOU) |
| 84.8 | Waldo | Waldo | junction with Peninsular Railroad (FC&P/SAL) |
| 88.2 | | Millicans | |
| 91.8 | Fairbanks | Fairbanks | |
| 94.9 | | Dowd's | |
| 96.2 | | Nedra | |
| 98.7 | Gainesville | Gainesville | junction with: Live Oak, Tampa and Charlotte Harbor Railroad (ACL); Florida Southern Railway (ACL); Tampa and Jacksonville Railway (SAL) |
| 102.6 | | Daysville | |
| 103.8 | Hammock Ridge | Hammock Ridge | |
| 104.7 | Arredondo | Arredondo | |
| 105.8 | Kanapaha | Kanapaha | |
| 108.9 | Palmer | Palmer | |
| 110.8 | | Peach Orchard | |
| 113.2 | Archer | Archer | junction with Early Bird Branch |
| 116.9 | | Venables | |
| 117.9 | | Albion | |
| 119.4 | | Meredith | |
| 122.5 | Bronson | Bronson | |
| 128.5 | | Lennon | |
| 134.3 | Otter Creek | Otter Creek | |
| 135.9 | | Ellzey | |
| 139.6 | | Emett | |
| 143.6 | | Wylly | |
| 145.5 | Rosewood | Rosewood | |
| 146.5 | | Hilton | |
| 148.0 | Sumner | Sumner | |
| 152.7 | | Lukens | |
| 155.7 | Cedar Key | Cedar Key | |

== See also ==
- Cross Florida Barge Canal
