= Fernandina Subdivision =

Railway line in Florida

Overview
- Owner: Seaboard Air Line Railroad (1925-1967); Seaboard Coast Line Railroad (1967-1986); CSX Transportation (1986-2005)
- Termini: Nassau, Florida; Fernandina Beach, Florida

Technical
- Track gauge: 1,435 mm (4 ft 8 1/2 in) standard gauge

The Fernandina Subdivision was a rail line historically operated by the Seaboard Air Line Railroad in northern Florida. It was later operated by Seaboard Air Line successors Seaboard Coast Line Railroad and CSX Transportation. At its greatest extent, the Fernandina Subdivision ran from a point just east of Callahan east to Fernandina Beach on Amelia Island. The line east of Yulee is still in service today and is now operated by the First Coast Railroad.

== Route description ==
The Fernandina Subdivision began just east of Callahan at a point known as Nassau at its greatest extent. From here, it ran west paralleling present-day State Road 200 to Yulee, where it crossed the Seaboard Air Line's main line. The Fernandina Subdivision continued west from Yulee across the Amelia River on to Amelia Island. It then turned north to its terminus in Fernandina Beach.

== History ==
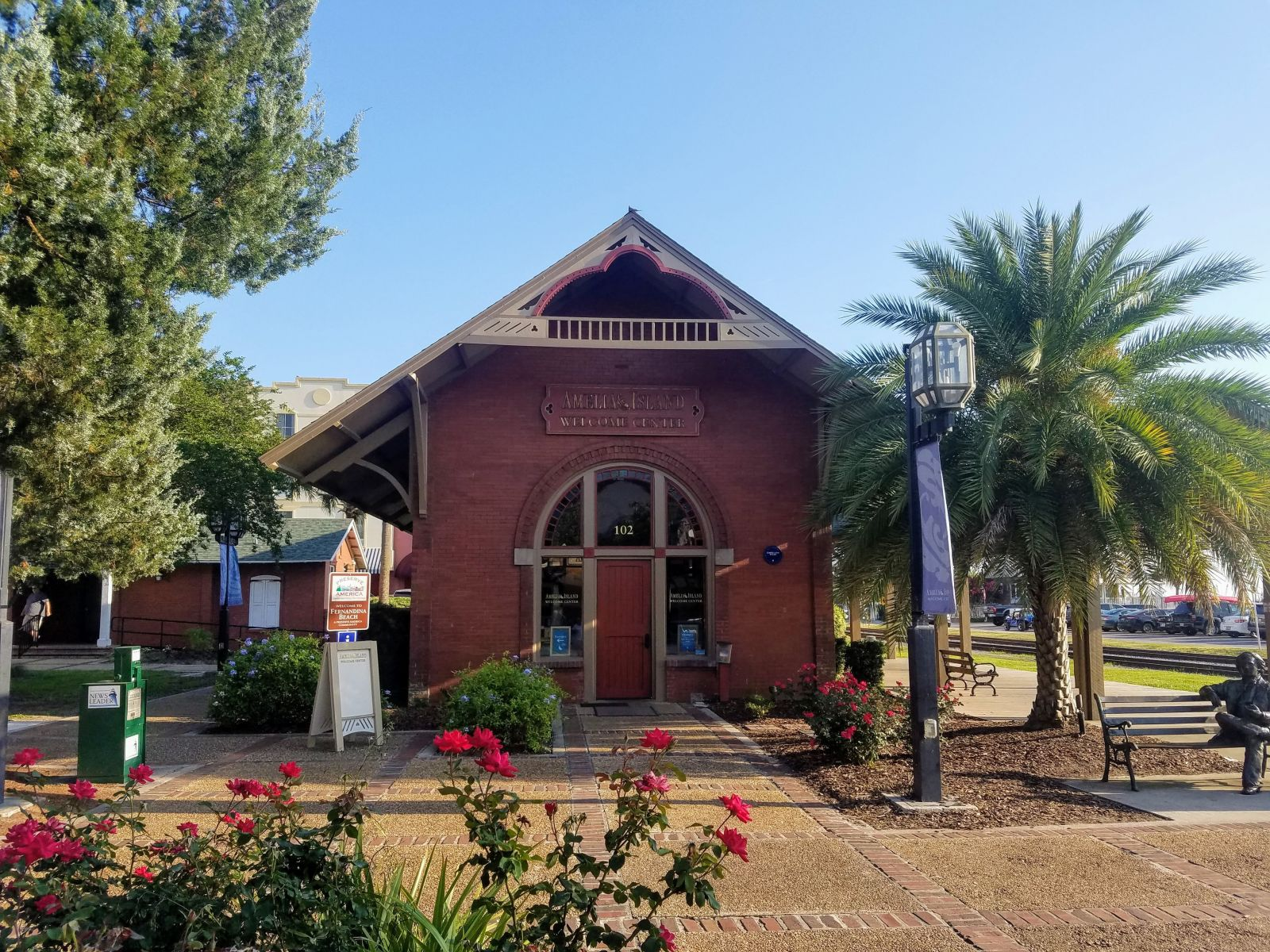
Fernandina depot, built in 1899, with the tracks to the right

The Fernandina Subdivision was originally built in 1858 by the Florida Railroad, which in its entirety ran from Fernandina Beach southwest to Cedar Key. The president and chief stockholder of the Florida Railroad was U.S. Senator David Levy Yulee, for whom the community of Yulee is named.

After various reorganizations and mergers, the Florida Railroad became part of the Florida Central and Peninsular Railroad (FC&P) network by 1893. In the early 1900s, the entire FC&P network was acquired by the Seaboard Air Line Railway (later known as the Seaboard Air Line Railroad). The Seaboard Air Line initially classified the line as part of its Ocala District.

In 1925, the Seaboard Air Line built the Gross Cutoff, which ran from the line at Nassau (just east of Callahan) northeast to the Seaboard's main line at Gross (located about 8 miles north of Yulee). The Gross Cutoff would become a more heavily trafficked route allowing trains to bypass Jacksonville. By 1936, the Seaboard Air Line designated the line from Nassau to Fernandina Beach as the Fernandina Subdivision while the Gross Cutoff and track west of Callahan was designated as the Gross Subdivision. Mixed trains service (both passengers and freight) ran the line from Fernandina to Baldwin through the 1930s.

In 1954, the Seaboard Air Line abandoned the Fernandina Subdivision west of Yulee; a segment that had become largely unnecessary due to the Gross Subdivision to the north.

In 1967, the Seaboard Air Line merged with its rival, the Atlantic Coast Line Railroad, whose main line crossed the Gross Subdivision in Callahan. In 1980, the Seaboard Coast Line's parent company merged with the Chessie System, creating the CSX Corporation. The CSX Corporation initially operated the Chessie and Seaboard Systems separately until 1986, when they were merged into CSX Transportation.

== Current conditions ==
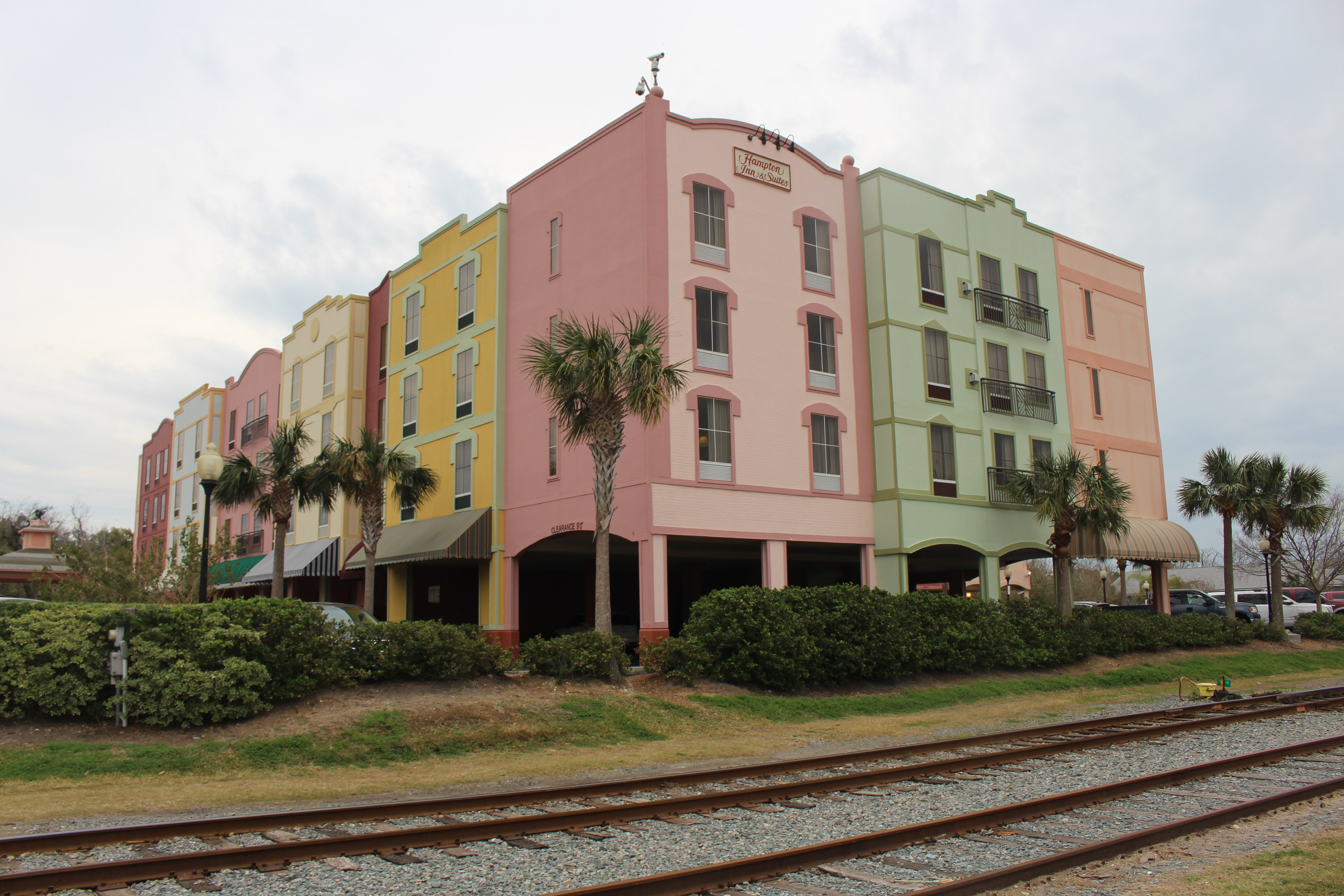
The Fernandina Subdivision in front of a Hampton Inn hotel in Fernandina Beach in 2017

The segment of the Fernandina Subdivision from Yulee to Fernandina Beach is still in service and it is operated by the First Coast Railroad. The First Coast Railroad took over the line from CSX, along with the remaining S Line (the former Seaboard Air Line main line) north of Yulee to Seals, Georgia, in 2005.

The former passenger depot in Fernandina Beach, which was built in 1899, now serves as the Amelia Island Welcome Center.

== Historic stations ==
Milepost	City/Location	Station	Connections and notes
SMA 21.5		Nassau	junction with Seaboard Air Line Railroad Gross Subdivision
SMA 28.4	Italia	Italia	
SMA 32.0		Hero	
SMA 35.2	Yulee	Yulee	junction with Seaboard Air Line Railroad Main Line
SMA 38.7	Yulee	Lofton	
SMA 41.2	O'Neill	O'Neill	
SMA 47.3	Fernandina Beach	Fernandina	

== See also ==
- Florida Railroad
