= Callahan Subdivision =

Railway line in Florida

The Callahan Subdivision is a CSX Transportation railroad line just northwest of Jacksonville, Florida. Spanning 20 miles, it runs from Baldwin north and northeast 20 miles to Callahan. The line primarily serves as a bypass to Jacksonville.

Prior to 1985, the line continued from Callahan northeast to Gross and it was known as the Gross Subdivision under CSX predecessors Seaboard Air Line Railroad and Seaboard Coast Line Railroad.

== Route description ==
The Callahan Subdivision begins just west of Jacksonville in Baldwin. At Baldwin Junction, it connects with CSX's S Line (Wildwood Subdivision) to the south and the Jacksonville Terminal Subdivision to the east. It also connects with the Florida Gulf and Atlantic Railroad to the west.

From Baldwin, the Callahan Subdivision heads northeast, passing through the communities of Bryceville and Ingle. It then crosses the Norfolk Southern Railway's Valdosta District in Crawford.

The Callahan Subdivision terminates in Callahan at a junction with CSX's A Line (Nahunta Subdivision).

== Operation ==
The Callahan Subdivision has three direct traffic control blocks (DTC), double tracks on its full entire route and two defect detector locations over its length. The first defect detector is at milepost SM 1.3 and the first siding, Fouraker, at a length of 6,690 feet (2,040 m), extends from milepost SM 3.5 to SM 5.0. The second defect detector is found at milepost SM 12.3 and the second siding, Crawford, a 10,900-foot (3,300 m) siding, runs from milepost SM 13.3 to SM 15.4. The three DTC blocks are Baldwin from milepost SM 0.18 to SM 5.0 followed by Fouraker from the SM 5.0 to SM 15.4 and last is Crawford from SM 15.4 to SM 20.0.

The Callahan Subdivision crosses the Norfolk Southern Railway at milepost SM 15.5. The line's dispatcher is known as the JE Dispatcher on channel 14 and 32: 160.320 MHz and 160.590 MHz respectively.

== History ==
=== Construction and early years ===
The line was originally built by the Florida Railroad as part of a line that ran from Fernandina Beach to Cedar Key. The first train ran in 1861. After various reorganizations and mergers, the Florida Railroad became part of the Florida Central and Peninsular Railroad (FC&P) network by 1893.

=== Seaboard Air Line Railroad ===
Gross Subdivision

Overview
- Owner: Seaboard Air Line Railroad (1925-1967); Seaboard Coast Line Railroad (1967-1985)
- Termini: Gross, Florida; Baldwin, Florida

Technical
- Track gauge: 1,435 mm (4 ft 8 1/2 in) standard gauge

The line would later become part of the Seaboard Air Line Railroad, who acquired the entire FC&P network, in 1903. The Seaboard Air Line initially classified the line as part of its Ocala District.

==== Gross Cutoff ====
In 1925, the Seaboard Air Line built the Gross Cutoff (also known as the Gross-Callahan Cutoff) which ran from the line near Callahan northeast to Gross on the company's main line. Gross was the name of a small turpentine village about 7 miles north of Yulee (near the current interchange between Interstate 95 and US 17). By 1936, the line was designated as the Gross Subdivision from Gross to Baldwin. A number of Seaboard's passenger trains, such as the Orange Blossom Special and the Silver Star, often ran the line when bypassing the often busy Jacksonville Union Terminal. Up until the late 1930s, a daily mixed train (consisting of both passengers and freight) also ran the line from Baldwin to Callahan and along the original route east to Fernandina Beach (known then as the Fernandina Subdivision).

The Gross Subdivision was busy enough by 1948 that the Seaboard Air Line installed Centralized traffic control along the line. The Fernandina Subdivision (part of the original Florida Railroad) was abandoned from Callahan east to Yulee in 1954 since the Gross Subdivision had become the primary route.

=== Mergers and consolidation ===
In 1967, the Seaboard Air Line merged with its rival, the Atlantic Coast Line Railroad, whose main line crossed the Gross Subdivision in Callahan. In 1980, the Seaboard Coast Line's parent company merged with the Chessie System, creating the CSX Corporation. The CSX Corporation initially operated the Chessie and Seaboard Systems separately until 1986, when they were merged into CSX Transportation.

In 1985, the company abandoned the Gross Subdivision north of Callahan. It became largely unnecessary after the company severed the Seaboard Air Line's main line (now known as the S Line) as a through route in southern Georgia the same year. The remaining route was then renamed the Callahan Subdivision as it is today.

== Historic Seaboard Air Line stations ==
Baldwin to Gross
Milepost	City/Location	Station	Connections and notes
SM 0.0	Baldwin	Baldwin	junction with: Seaboard Air Line Railroad Main Line & Tallahassee Subdivision; Atlantic Coast Line Railroad Jacksonville—Wilcox Line
SM 3.9		Fouraker	
SM 6.3	Bryceville	Bryceville	
SM 8.9	Ingle	Ingle	
SM 15.5	Crawford	Crawford	junction with Atlantic, Valdosta and Western Railway (GSF/SOU)
SM 19.9	Callahan	Callahan	junction with Atlantic Coast Line Railroad Main Line
SM 21.5		Nassau	junction with Seaboard Air Line Railroad Fernandina Subdivision
SM 28.4		Mill's Creek	
SM 34.4	Gross	Gross	junction with Seaboard Air Line Railroad Main Line

== See also ==
- List of CSX Transportation lines
