= Kingsland Subdivision =

Railway line in Florida

The Kingsland Subdivision is a railroad line owned by CSX Transportation in Northeast Florida. It runs from Jacksonville north to Yulee, a distance of about 20 miles. The line's namesake is Kingsland, Georgia, which is located north of Yulee on track that was part of the Kingsland Subdivision prior to 2005, but is now part of the First Coast Railroad.

== Route description ==
The Kingsland Subdivision begins in Jacksonville, where it splits off CSX's A Line Jacksonville Terminal Subdivision just north of Moncrief Yard. From there, it heads east and then turns north near Panama Park. From Panama Park, the Kingsland Subdivision heads north on a discontinuous piece of CSX's S Line. As it heads north, it passes the Port of Jacksonville and just east of Jacksonville International Airport. The line terminates in Yulee, where it connects with the First Coast Railroad.

== Operation ==
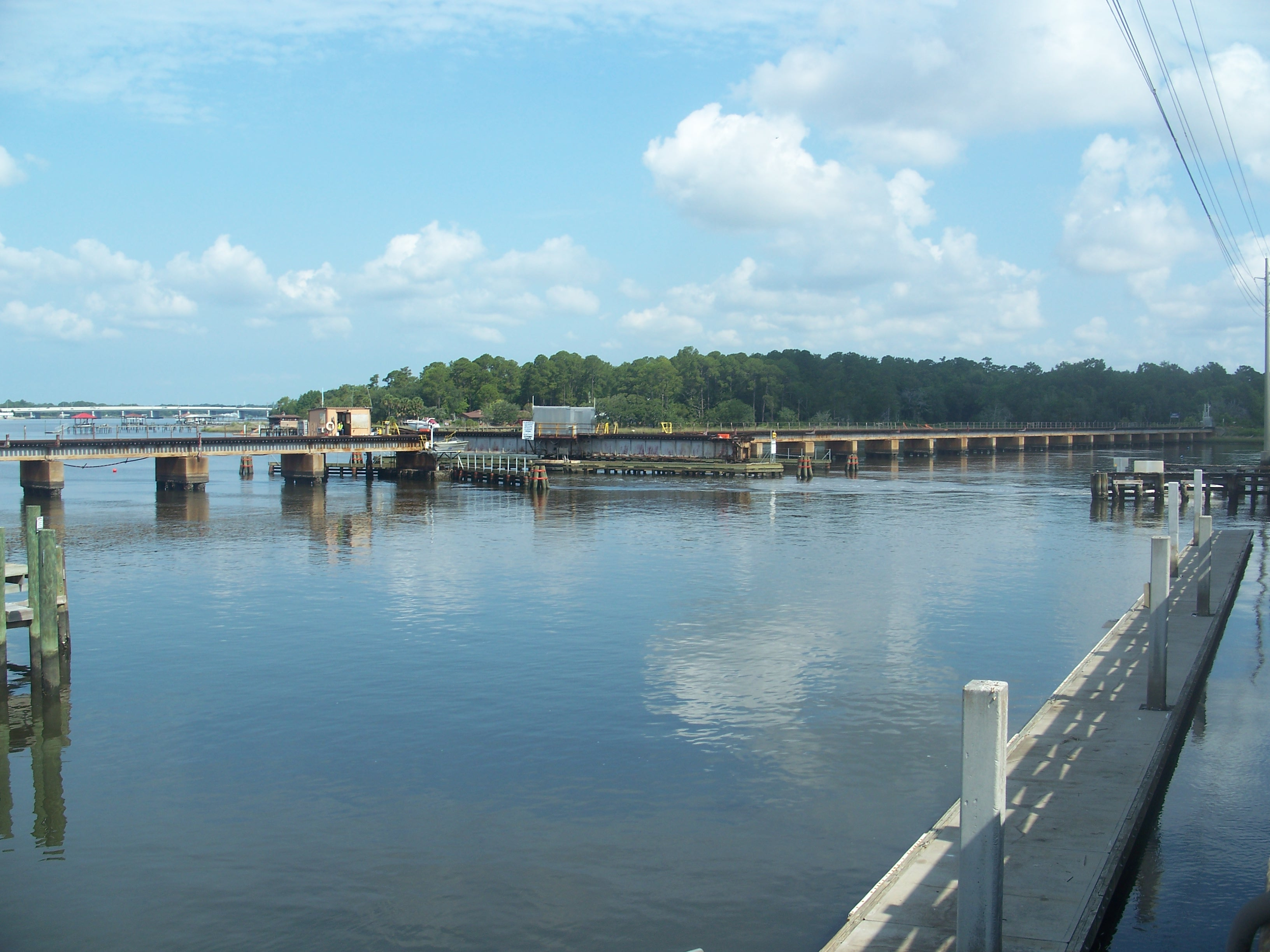
Kingsland Subdivision bridge over Trout River

The Kingsland Subdivision provides access to the Port of Jacksonville, the largest marine port in Florida. CSX also uses the line to interchange with the First Coast Railroad in Yulee.

== History ==
From Jacksonville to Panama Park, the line was originally the easternmost segment of the Jacksonville and Southwestern Railroad which was built in 1899. In 1904, the Jacksonville and Southwestern Railroad became part of the Atlantic Coast Line Railroad, which would merge with the Seaboard Air Line Railroad in 1967.

From Panama Park north, the line was built by the Fernandina and Jacksonville Railroad, which was organized in 1874 and opened in 1881. The Fernandina and Jacksonville Railroad would later become part of the Florida Central and Peninsular Railroad (FC&P). FC&P would charter the Florida Northern Railroad to extend the line north of Yulee to Savannah, Georgia, in 1894 to connect with the South Bound Railroad (which was absorbed by the FC&P in 1893).

In 1900, the Florida Central and Peninsular Railroad became part of the Seaboard Air Line Railroad, and the line became Seaboard's main line. The Seaboard would designate the main line between Savannah, Georgia and Jacksonville as the Jacksonville Subdivision.

Seaboard Air Line became the Seaboard Coast Line Railroad (SCL) after merging with the Atlantic Coast Line in 1967. The Seaboard Air Line's main line was then known as the S Line after the merger to differentiate it the former Atlantic Coast Line's nearby main line (the A Line). After the merger, the S Line between Savannah and Jacksonville was renamed the Everett Subdivision. The Seaboard Coast Line became the CSX Corporation in the 1980s. CSX abandoned the line from Riceboro, Georgia, to Seals, Georgia, gradually from 1985 to 1986 and redesignated the remaining track to the south as the Kingsland Subdivision. CSX then leased the line from Yulee north to Seals (and the former Fernandina Subdivision from Yulee to Fernandina Beach) to the First Coast Railroad in 2005.

The S Line south of Panama Park was abandoned in the 1980s. The former Jacksonville and Southwestern Railroad has been used to connect the remaining line to the rest of the Jacksonville Terminal Subdivision ever since. The original Seaboard Air Line track from Panama Park south to Jacksonville is now the S-Line Urban Greenway.

== See also ==
- List of CSX Transportation lines
