= Riceboro Southern Railway =

Railway in the southern United States

Overview
- Headquarters: Garden City, Georgia
- Reporting mark: RSOR
- Locale: Georgia
- Dates of operation: 2004–

Technical
- Track gauge: 4 ft 8 1/2 in (1,435 mm) standard gauge

The Riceboro Southern Railway (reporting mark RSOR) began operations in 2004 on about 33 miles of track, some of which is leased from CSX Transportation. The track on which it runs is part of the ex-Seaboard Air Line route from Savannah, Georgia to Jacksonville, Florida. It runs generally from Ogeechee, Georgia, where the line splits from the CSX Savannah Subdivision, which is the former Atlantic Coast Line Railroad's Savannah-Jacksonville route, and Riceboro. It does not have any of its own locomotives; it uses Georgia Central power.

== Ownership ==
The Riceboro Southern is owned and operated by its parent, the Georgia Central Railway, LP, which is owned by Rail Link, a subsidiary of Genesee & Wyoming Inc.

== Business ==
The sole purpose of the shortline is serving the Interstate Paper Company and SNF Chemtall, a chemical manufacturer, both located in Riceboro, and taking the freight cars to Savannah, where they interchange with CSX.

== History ==
The line was built in 1894 by the Florida Northern Railroad. It was an extension of the Fernandina and Jacksonville Railroad north to Savannah, Georgia to connect with the South Bound Railroad in Savannah. The Florida Northern Railroad was eventually absorbed by the Florida Central and Peninsular Railroad by 1893.

In 1900, the Florida Central and Peninsular Railroad became part of the Seaboard Air Line Railroad, and the line became Seaboard's main line. Seaboard Air Line became the Seaboard Coast Line Railroad after merging with the Atlantic Coast Line in 1967. The merged company became the CSX Corporation in the 1980s.

CSX abandoned the S Line between Riceboro and Seals, Georgia gradually from 1985 to 1986.

CSX leased the line to Riceboro Southern Railway in 2004. The remaining track south of Seals is currently operated by the First Coast Railroad, another subsidiary of Genesee & Wyoming Inc.
