= Campville, Florida =

Human settlement in Florida, US

Coordinates: 29°39′59″N 82°07′06″W

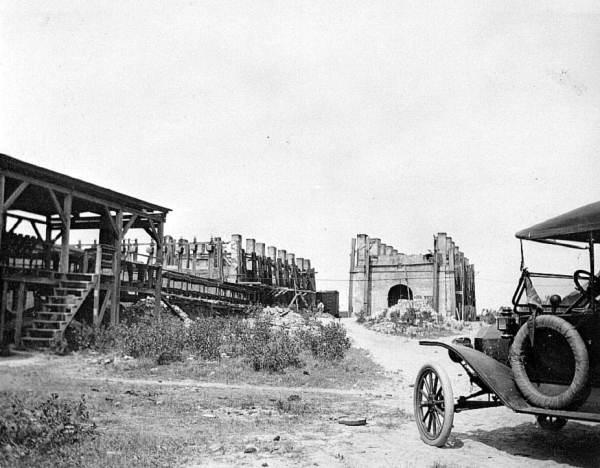
Photo of the brick factory in the community of Campville, Alachua County, Florida, USA. The photo was given to Herman Gunter by the owner of the plant, Mr. Maulsby, in 1914.

Campville is a community in eastern Alachua County, Florida, north of Hawthorne. The community grew up along the route of the Florida Transit and Peninsular Railroad, with a sawmill, a store, a church, a school and a score of homes in the area when a post office was established in 1881. It was named for three brothers by the name of Camp who ran a large sawmill in the area. The population was about 300 in 1928, when a brick factory, several tree nurseries, and four stores were located in the community. The brick factory was also founded by the Camp brothers and bricks produced there can be seen in Gainesville's old downtown buildings. The bricks are a tan buff color. The post office was closed in 1966.

Campville is located along U.S. Route 301 and the CSX Wildwood Subdivision between Hawthorne and Orange Heights, and is closer to the latter of these cities.
