= Fairvilla, Florida =

Unincorporated community in Florida, US

- Unincorporated community
- Location within Florida
- Coordinates: 28°34′44″N 81°24′31″W
- Country: United States
- State: Florida
- County: Orange
- Elevation: 98 ft (30 m)
- Time zone: UTC-5 (Eastern (EST))
  - Summer (DST): UTC-4 (EDT)
- Area codes: 407, 689, 321
- GNIS feature ID: 282342

Fairvilla is an unincorporated community in Orange County, Florida, United States. The community is located along U.S. Route 441 along the northern border of Orlando, and parts of it have been annexed by the city. The area is known as a commercial district.

During the 1980s, an urban legend began regarding a large red apeman known as the "Fairvilla Gorilla", which had supposedly been sighted in the area.
