= Sydney, Florida =

Unincorporated community in Florida, US

- Unincorporated community
- Location within Florida Location within the United States
- Coordinates: 27°57′48″N 82°12′26″W
- Country: United States
- State: Florida
- County: Hillsborough
- Elevation: 92 ft (28 m)
- Time zone: UTC-5 (Eastern (EST))
  - Summer (DST): UTC-4 (EDT)
- ZIP code: 33587
- Area code: 813
- GNIS feature ID: 291978

Sydney is an unincorporated community in Hillsborough County, Florida, United States. The community is located along a railroad 5.1 miles (8.2 km) east-northeast of Brandon. Sydney has a post office with ZIP code 33587.
