= Early Bird, Florida =

- Unincorporated community
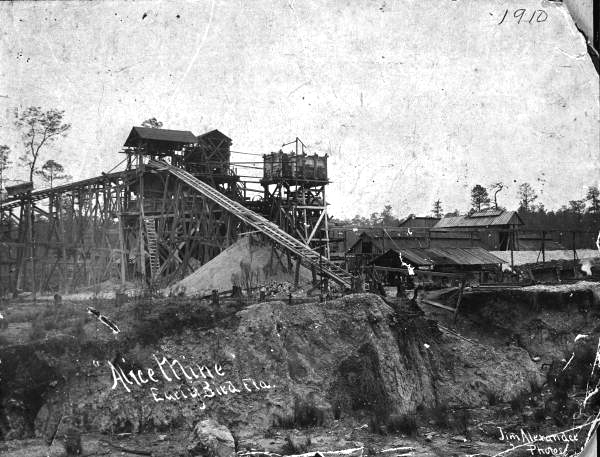
- The Alice Mine in Early Bird, 1910

- Location within Florida Location within the United States
- Coordinates: 29°12′57″N 82°22′03″W
- Country: United States
- State: Florida
- County: Marion
- Elevation: 75 ft (23 m)
- Time zone: UTC-5 (Eastern (EST))
  - Summer (DST): UTC-4 (EDT)
- GNIS feature ID: 295250

Early Bird is an unincorporated community in Marion County, Florida, United States.

== History ==
Early Bird was located along a now-abandoned 29 mi (47 km) branch of the Florida Central and Peninsular Railroad, constructed in 1891.

A phosphate mine was located in Early Bird, and other mines were located nearby.

Early Bird had a post office in 1893.

By 1915, the mine had been "long ago abandoned".

In 1920, the Melton Timber Company operated a logging railroad and mill in Early Bird.
