= First Coast Railroad =

Railroad in America

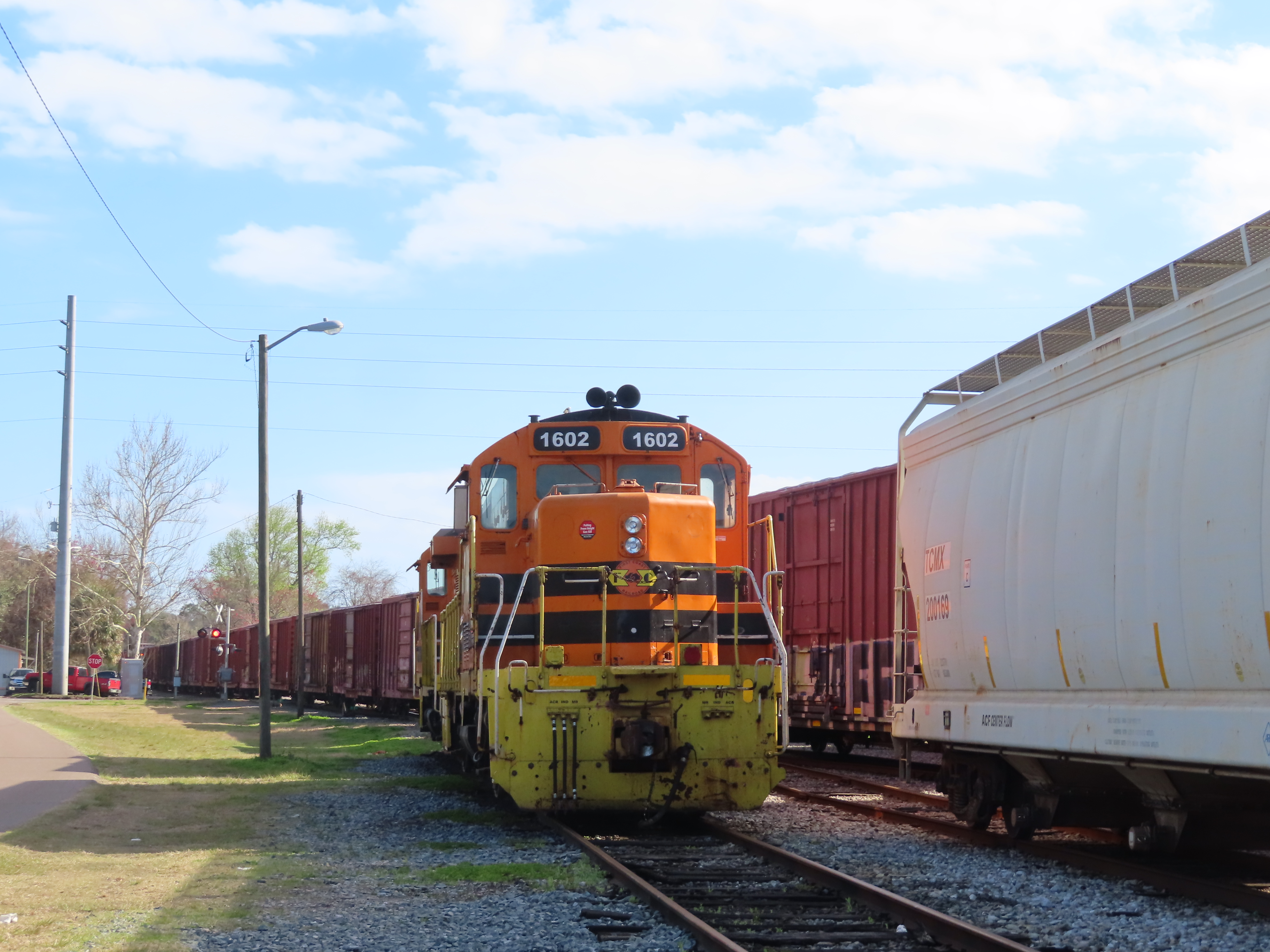
- A First Coast Railroad diesel locomotive at a yard in Fernandina Beach, Florida.

Overview
- Headquarters: Fernandina, Florida
- Reporting mark: FCRD
- Locale: Florida and Georgia, United States
- Dates of operation: 2005–present

Technical
- Track gauge: 4 ft 8 1/2 in (1,435 mm) standard gauge
- Length: 31 miles (50 km)

Other
- Website: Official website

The First Coast Railroad (reporting mark FCRD) is a class III railroad operating in Florida and Georgia, owned by Genesee & Wyoming. The name is derived from its area of operations around the First Coast of Florida.

The FCRD was founded in April 2005 to lease 32 miles of a former Seaboard Air Line Railroad from CSX. It stretches east from Yulee to Fernandina Beach, Florida and north from Yulee to Seals, with a connection at Yulee to CSX.

The north–south line, formerly the Seaboard Air Line main line before it was abandoned by the combined Seaboard Coast Line Railroad in favor of the ex-Atlantic Coast Line Railroad main line to the west, connects to the St. Marys Railroad at Kingsland. The line is abandoned north of Seals. The line from Yulee to Fernandina Beach, which was previously the Fernandina Subdivision, terminates at a WestRock Papermill along the east coast of the Amelia River just south of the mouth of Egans Creek.

== History ==
The line from Yulee north into southern Georgia was built in 1894 by the Florida Northern Railroad. It was an extension of the Fernandina and Jacksonville Railroad north to Savannah, Georgia to connect with the South Bound Railroad. The line from Yulee to Fernandina Beach was completed in 1861 by the Florida Railroad which connected Fernandina Beach with Cedar Key. The Florida Railroad, Florida Northern Railroad, Fernandina and Jacksonville Railroad, and the South Bound Railroad were all eventually absorbed by the Florida Central & Peninsular Railroad by 1893.

In 1900, the Florida Central & Peninsular Railroad became part of the Seaboard Air Line Railroad, and the line into Georgia became Seaboard's main line.

Seaboard Air Line became the Seaboard Coast Line Railroad after merging with the Atlantic Coast Line in 1967. The former Seaboard Air Line mainline was designated as the S Line with this specific segment known as the Everett Subdivision. The route to Fernandina Beach was designated the Fernandina Subdivision. The Seaboard Coast Line became the CSX Corporation in the 1980s. With the former Atlantic Coast Line main line (A Line) being used as the through route in the combined network, CSX abandoned the S Line between Riceboro, Georgia (just southwest of Savannah) and Bladen, Georgia in 1986 and redesignated the remaining track as the Kingsland Subdivision (a designation which remains on the CSX line south of Yulee). Track between Bladen and Seals was removed in 1990.

CSX leased the lines north of Yulee to the First Coast Railroad in 2005. The remaining Seaboard track north of Riceboro is operated by the Riceboro Southern Railway, another subsidiary of Genesee & Wyoming.
