= Florida State Road 200 =

State highway in Florida, United States

State Road 200
- Florida State Road 200 highlighted in red

Route information
- Maintained by FDOT
- Length: 155.816 mi (250.762 km)
- Existed: 1945–present

Major junctions
- South end: US 41 in Hernando
- I-75 in Ocala; US 27 / US 301 / US 441 in Ocala; I-10 in Baldwin; US 1 / US 23 / US 301 / SR A1A in Callahan; I-95 near Yulee; US 17 in Yulee
- East end: SR A1A in Fernandina Beach

Location
- Country: United States
- State: Florida

Highway system
- Florida State Highway System; Interstate; US; State; Former; Pre‑1945; Toll; Scenic
← SR 196	→ SR 202

State Road 200 (SR 200) is a major diagonal road in central and northeast Florida. Its southern terminus is at US 41 (SR 45) in Hernando (Citrus County). Its eastern terminus is at SR A1A in Fernandina Beach (Nassau County), at the corner of Atlantic Avenue and Fletcher Avenue.

== Route description ==
SR 200 is signed from Hernando through Apache Shores and Stokes Ferry in Citrus County, passing a narrow bridge over the Withlacoochee River. Entering Marion County, it passes by the Ross Prairie State Forest and continues through Marion Oaks where it changes from a two-lane road to a six-lane divided boulevard and continues with this width as it runs towards the City of Ocala. Within Ocala it serves as the first interchange in the city for Interstate 75 at exit 350 and later becomes an unsigned route for US 27, 301 and 441 within the city. This section is also overlapped by hidden State Road 25 as well as hidden State Road 500. SR 500 leaves the overlap along with US 27 across from the western terminus of Florida State Road 492 in northern Ocala, while SR 25 leaves the overlap with US 441 in southwestern Citra.

The rest of SR 200 remains a hidden state route for US 301 north to Callahan. Then it is signed again from Callahan where it's also signed concurrently with SR A1A. The segment that is overlapped with SR A1A runs along the northern edge of the Four Creeks State Forest, through Italia, and later passes under Interstate 95 at Exit 373. From there it passes through Yulee where it crosses the CSX Kingsland Subdivision and then US 17. East of there it passes through the wetlands of Lofton Creek, and then turns southeast heading through O'Neil. The routes curve back to the northeast climbing the Thomas J. Shave Jr. Bridge over the Amelia River and finally enters Fernandina Beach, where it makes a sharp curve to the north before turning to the right on Atlantic Avenue, and finally terminates at South Fletcher Avenue.

== Gallery ==
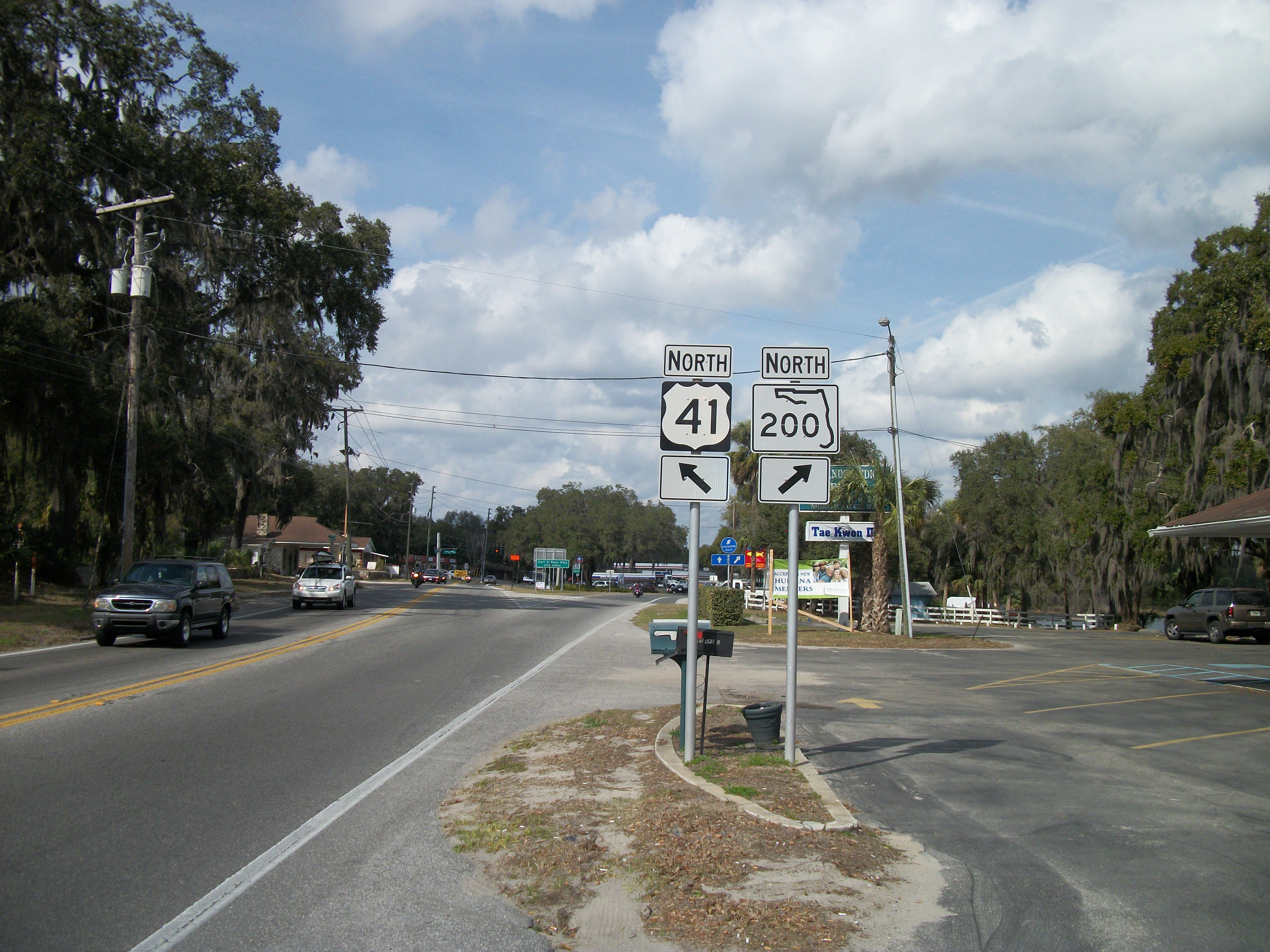
Beginning of SR 200 north in Hernando.

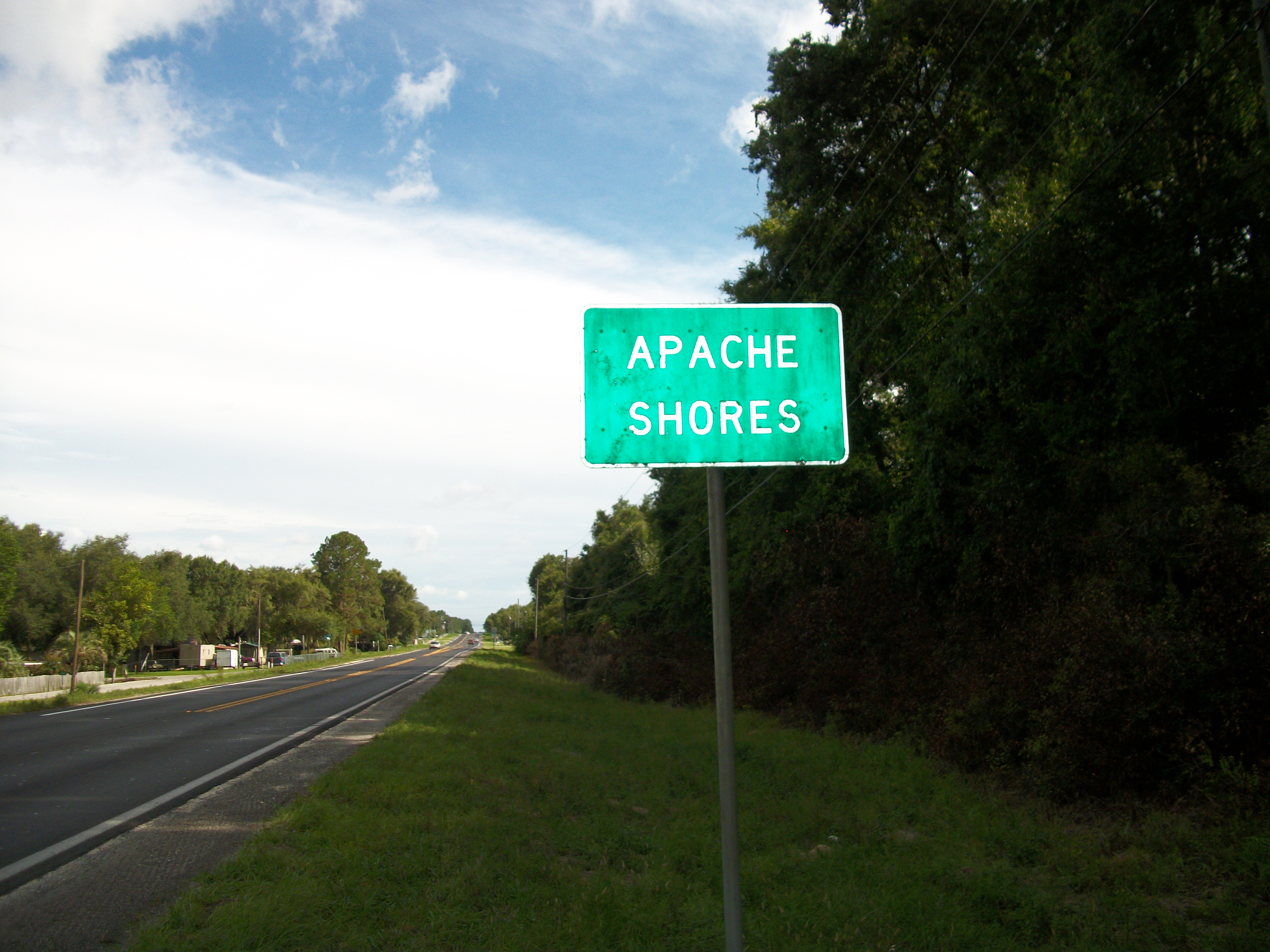
Southbound SR 200 in Apache Shores.

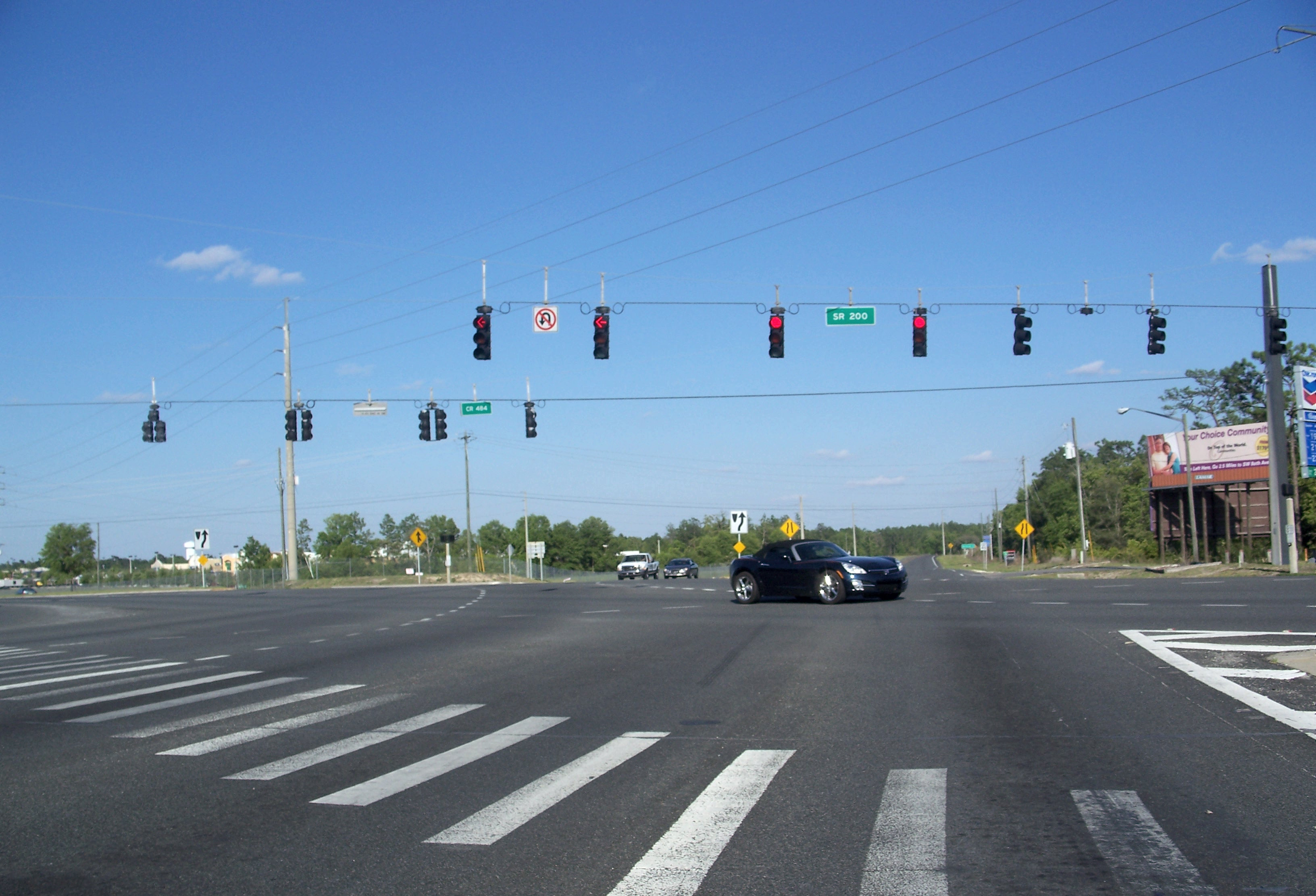
Intersection of County Road 484 and SR 200.

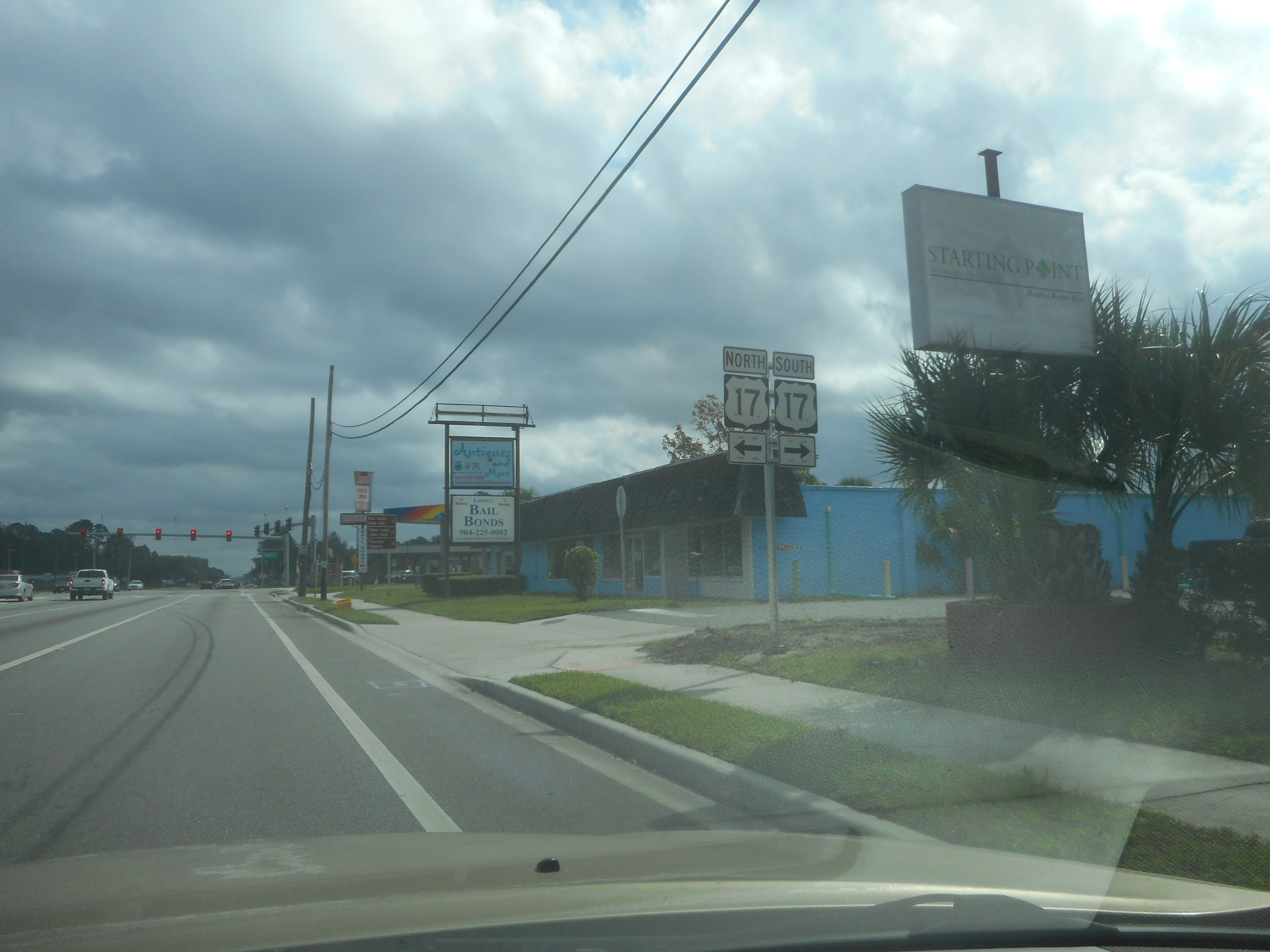
Northbound SR 200 and southbound SR A1A at US 17 in Yulee.

== Major intersections ==
County	Location	mi	km	Destinations	Notes
Citrus	Hernando	0.000	0.000	US 41 (North Florida Avenue / SR 45) – Inverness, Dunnellon	
Citrus	Hernando	5.327	8.573	CR 491 south (North Lecanto Highway) – Beverly Hills	
Citrus	Hernando	6.389	10.282	CR 39 west	
Citrus; Marion	Stokes Ferry	6.540	10.525	Bridge over Withlacoochee River	
Marion		12.545	20.189	CR 484 – Dunnellon, Belleview, Airport	
Marion	Ocala	21.48	34.57	I-75 (SR 93) – Lake City, Tampa, St. Petersburg	I-75 exit 350
Marion	Ocala	22.889	36.836	CR 475A south (Southwest 27th Avenue)	
Marion	Ocala	23.632	38.032	SR 464 east (Southwest 17th Street) to US 27 south / US 301 south / US 441 south – National Guard Armory	
Marion	Ocala	24.959	40.168	US 27 south / US 301 south / US 441 south (South Pine Avenue / SR 25 / SR 500) – Belleview	west end of US 27 / US 301 / US 441 / SR 25 / SR 500 overlap
see US 441 (mile 319.221-330.372), US 301 (mile 148.517-251.425)
Nassau	Callahan	127.867	205.782	US 1 / US 23 / US 301 north (SR 15) – Jacksonville, Hilliard, Folkston	east end of US 301 overlap; west end of SR A1A overlap; northern terminus of SR A1A
Nassau		139.73	224.87	I-95 (SR 9) – Savannah, Jacksonville	I-95 exit 373
Nassau	Yulee	142.778	229.779	US 17 (SR 5) – Kingsland, GA, Jacksonville	
Nassau	O'Neil	148.050	238.263	CR 107 south (Old Nassauville Road) / Oneil-Scott Road	
Nassau	Amelia River	149.798– 150.396	241.077– 242.039	Thomas J. Shave Jr. Bridge over Amelia River (Atlantic Intracoastal Waterway)	
Nassau		151.982	244.591	Sadler Road (CR 108 east)	
Nassau	Fernandina Beach	154.176	248.122	Centre Street / North 8th Street - Port of Fernandina, Downtown Fernandina Beach	signed east end of SR 200
Nassau	Fernandina Beach	155.816	250.762	SR A1A south (Fletcher Avenue / SR 105 south)	
1.000 mi = 1.609 km; 1.000 km = 0.621 mi: Concurrency terminus

== Related routes ==
=== Former State Road 200A ===
State Road 200A
- Location: Ocala-Citra

State Road 200A (SR 200A) in Ocala and northern Marion County is now County Road 200A. It was also former U.S. Route 301 Alternate. The first segment is named 20th Street and begins at US 301 in Ocala north of a railroad bridge. Upon reaching Northeast Eighth Road, former SR 200 becomes Jacksonville Road, a street name it carries until it terminates with US 301 in Citra. Other County Road 200A's can be found in Alachua, Bradford, and Nassau Counties.

=== Alachua County ===
County Road 200A
- Location: Island Grove-Hawthorne

County Road 200A exists in two segments in Alachua County; One in Island Grove, and the other in Hawthorne. The road is also a former segment of US 301, and is even signed as "Old US 301" in Hawthorne.

The Island Grove CR 200A begins at US 301 across from the southeastern terminus of Alachua CR 325. The route passes by a wye intersection with Southeast 201st Terrace, which has historically been an old segment of US 301/SR 200. The route crosses the CSX Wildwood Subdivision, then turns north onto 203rd Street. From there the route remains along the east side of the tracks until it terminates at the foot of the US 301 bridges crossing over the tracks.

In the Hawthorne area CR 200A begins at US 301 to the left, following the CSX line while mainline US 301 moves away from the tracks. Past a firehouse, the route crosses the CSX Edgar Spur, and then the Wildwood Subdivision. North of the tracks, the road runs straight north and south and crosses CR 2082 at the vicinity of the former city hall. North of 65th Avenue, the road turns to the northwest and ends at the left side of the SPUI-interchange of FL 20 and US 301.

=== Bradford County ===
==== County Road 200A ====
County Road 200A
- Location: Lawtey

County Road 200A is one of two suffixed alternates of State Road 200 in Lawtey. It branches off to and runs along the west side of US 301/SR 200 from the aforementioned route through CR 225 (Madison Street). One block later the route turns right onto Lake Street and runs for three blocks until it terminates at the north end of a multiplex with US 301 and CR 225. CR 225 continues in a one block concurrency with US 301 and turns east onto Lake Street.

==== County Road 200B ====
County Road 200B
- Location: Lawtey

County Road 200B is another one of the two suffixed alternates of State Road 200 in Lawtey. It runs along the east side of US 301/SR 200 and begins at the same route just north of the southern terminus of CR 200A. CR 200B runs east as it passes by the Peetsville Memorial Cemetery before crossing the CSX Wildwood Subdivision. The road curves to the north between Northeast 212st Street and Northeast 17th Avenue then winds around local streets within Lawtey until it terminates at CR 225 (Lake Street).

=== Nassau County ===
County Road 200A
- Location: Yulee

County Road 200A is the last suffixed alternate of SR 200 in the state. It runs along Pages Dairy Road west of US 17 in Yulee and runs north of the road until it reaches Chester River Road (a.k.a.; Old Chester Road) in Lofton, then turns south along Chester River Road until it terminates at SR 200, which at this point is also multiplexed with SR A1A.

== Popular culture ==
- / Florida Man
