= Ford, Georgia =

Coordinates: 34.1889847°N 84.9660551°W

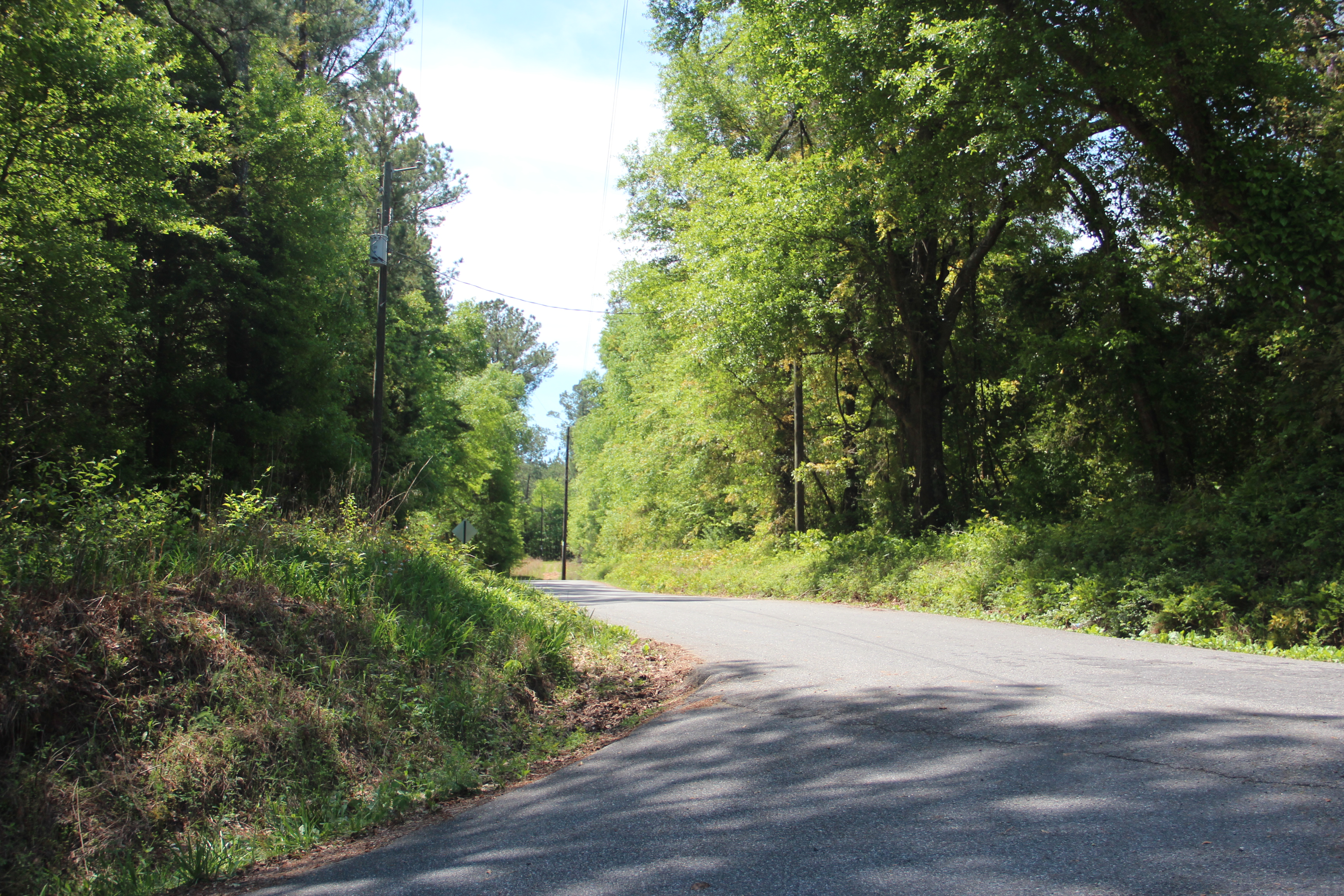
Worthington Road in Ford

Ford is an extinct town in Bartow County, in the U.S. state of Georgia.

== History ==
A post office called Ford was established in 1888, and remained in operation until 1907. The community has the name of Joseph Ford, a pioneer citizen.
