= Gross, Florida =

Unincorporated community in Florida, U.S.

Gross
- Unincorporated community
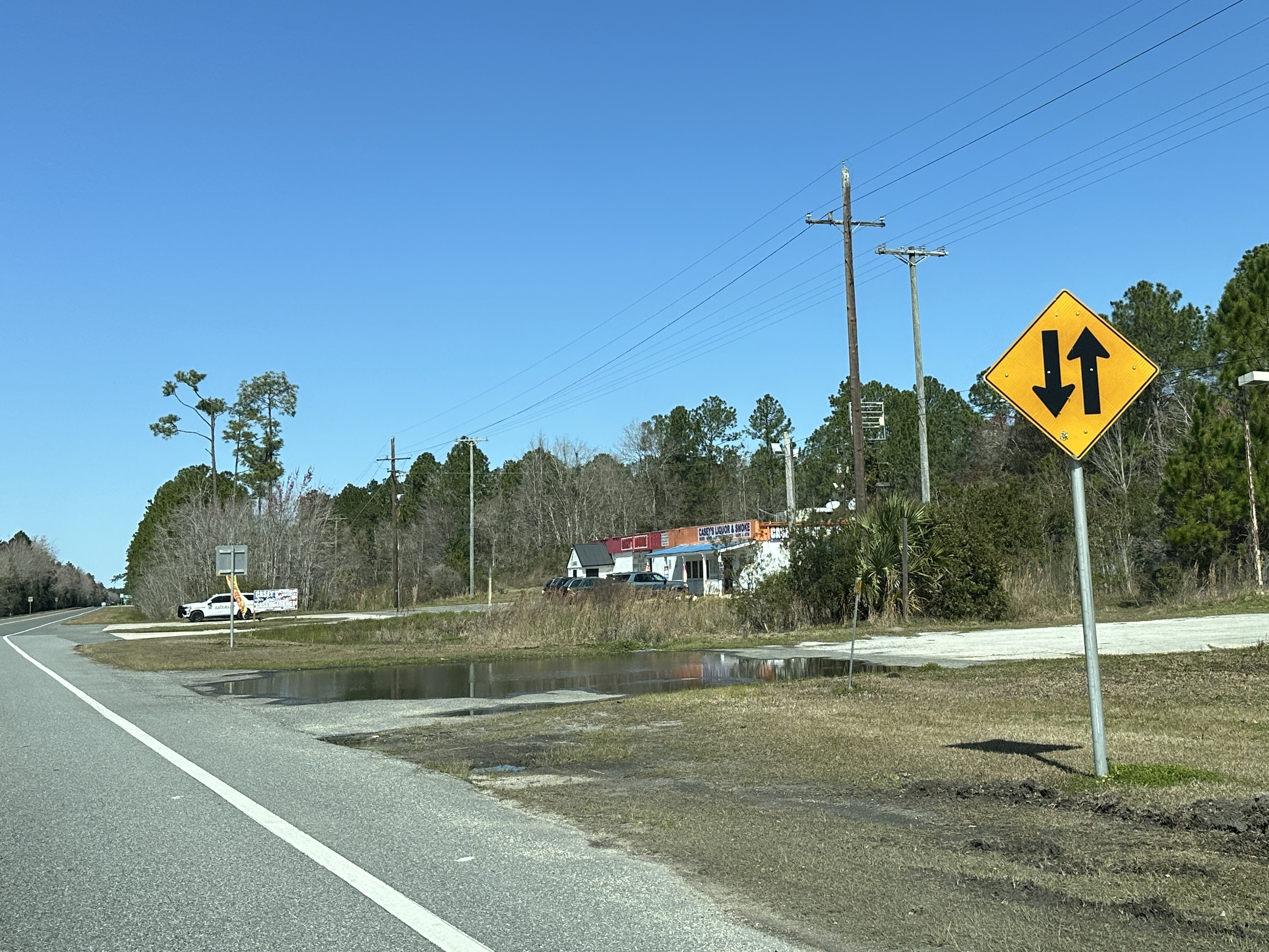
- Gross, Florida, photographed moving northwest on US 17.
- Interactive map of Gross
- Coordinates: 30°42′58″N 81°40′31″W
- Country: United States
- State: Florida
- Counties: Nassau
- Elevation: 23 ft (7.0 m)
- Time zone: UTC-5 (Eastern Time Zone)
  - Summer (DST): UTC-4 (Eastern Daylight Time)
- ZIP Code: 32097
- Area code: 904
- GNIS feature ID: 294793

Gross is an unincorporated community in Nassau County, Florida, United States. It is located on U.S. Route 17 in the north of the county, and is also the northernmost interchange (Exit 380) along Interstate 95 within the U.S. state of Florida. Being an unincorporated community, the addresses of all buildings in Gross are labeled as belonging to Yulee, the nearest in-state city located 7.1 mi (11.4 km) southeast. Few buildings and businesses reside in the community modern day, but include a bar, landscaping business, and campground.

== Geography ==
The nearest settlement to Gross is Crandall, Florida, at 3.1 mi (5.0 km) south-southeast. The nearest city to Gross is Kingsland, Georgia at 5.8 mi (9.3 km) north, and the nearest city in-state is Yulee at 7.1 mi (11.4 km) southeast.

== History ==
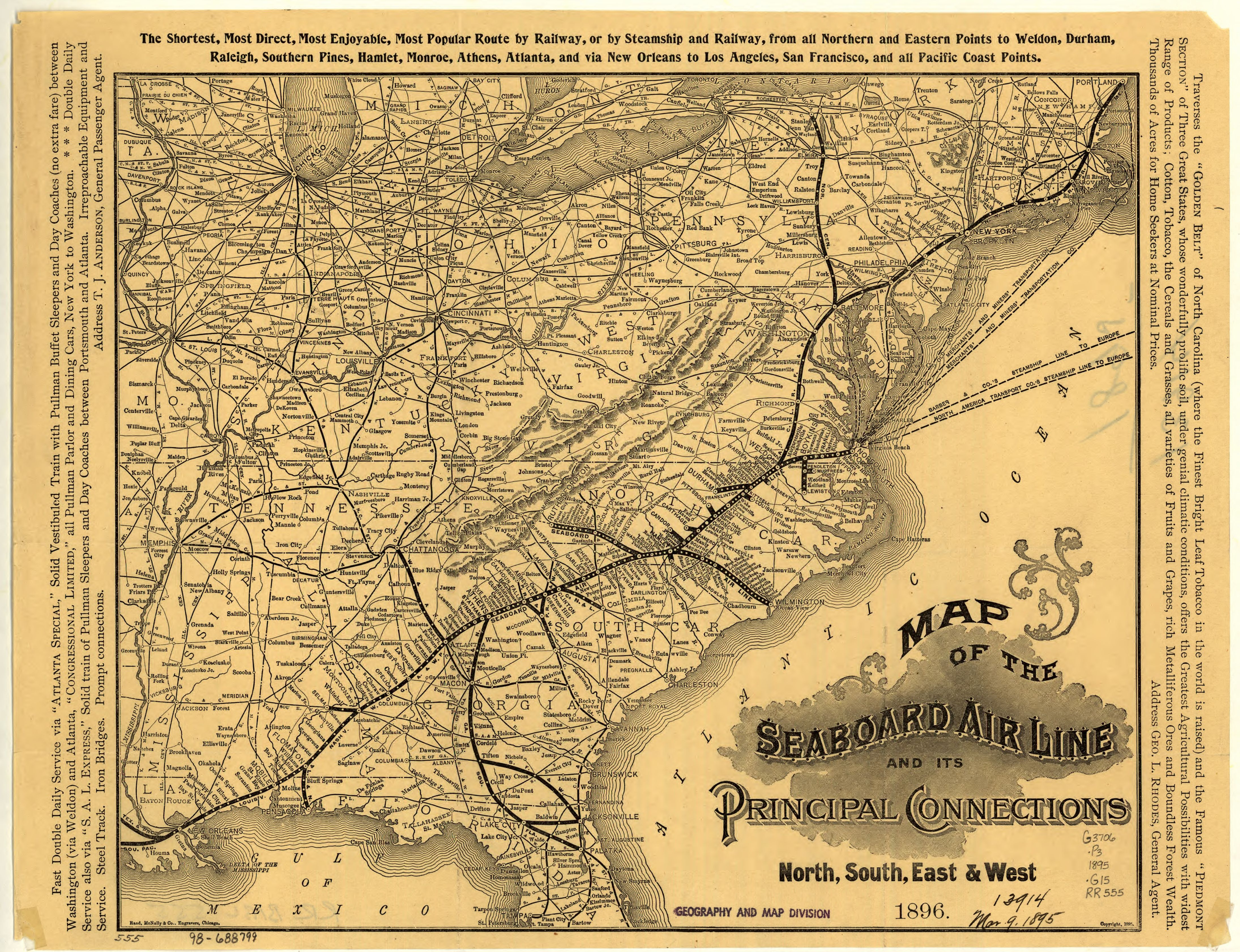
Map of the Main Line of Seaboard Air Line Railroad, with the route to Jacksonville passing through Gross.

The community began as a small turpentine village along the Seaboard Air Line Railroad main line. It became the starting location for the Gross Cutoff, a railroad cutoff from the SAL main line passing through the community, that ran from Gross to Callahan, Florida via a junction with the Callahan Subdivision. The line was created as a bypass route for passenger trains, such as the Silver Meteor, which often became congested at the larger Union Terminal in Jacksonville. The line operated for sixty years between 1925 and 1985, before it was deemed to be unnecessary and abandoned. The section of the Seaboard Air Line Railroad Main Line that passed through the community, which also has since ceased operations, is currently operated by First Coast Railroad.

The community has few building modern day, but is home to some small businesses including "Casey's Lounge & Liquor", a small bar which occasionally hosts live music, "Designer Landscaping", a landscaping business, and "Horne Lake RV Park", a campground adjacent to the nearby Horne Lake.
