= Crawford, Florida =

Unincorporated community in Florida, U.S.

Crawford
- Interactive map of Crawford
- Coordinates: 30.5086°N 81.8811°W
- Country: USA
- State: Florida
- County: Nassau County

Crawford is an unincorporated community in Nassau County, Florida, United States. It is located on US 301 in the southwestern part of the county. The community also includes a railroad junction with the CSX Callahan Subdivision and the Norfolk Southern Railway Valdosta District.

Crawford is also the home of the Thomas Creek Tract of the Cary State Forest.
