= Seals, Georgia =

Unincorporated community in Camden County, Georgia, US

Seals
- Unincorporated community
- Seals, Georgia
- Location of Seals in the State of Georgia
- Coordinates: 30°52′22″N 81°42′15″W
- Country: United States
- State: Georgia
- County: Camden County
- Elevation: 21 ft (6.4 m)
- Time zone: UTC−5 (EST)
  - Summer (DST): UTC−4 (EDT)
- Area code: 912

Seals is an unincorporated community located in eastern Camden County, in the U.S. state of Georgia. The community sits at an elevation of approximately 21 ft (6.4 m) above sea level.

Historically centered around coastal rail infrastructure, Seals is recognized today as the northern physical terminus of the active First Coast Railroad.

== Geography ==
Seals is situated at the intersection of the Old Jefferson Highway and the First Coast Railroad line, located directly east of the Floyd Hammock area. It lies roughly halfway between the cities of Woodbine to the north and Kingsland to the south, a position consistently documented on Camden County topographical and civil engineering maps from 1895 through the mid-20th century.

Directly east of the settlement lies Seals Swamp, a regional wetland network positioned at 30°52′6″N 81°41′0″W.

== History ==
Prior to the American Civil War, the economy of Camden County relied heavily on large-scale agrarian plantations, with 68 separate operational estates documented across the county. Following the war, the collapse and subsequent abandonment of the plantation system catalyzed a structural transition toward small-scale family farming. This shift led to the establishment of numerous small, scattered rural hamlets throughout the late 19th century, many of which eventually declined into ghost towns or archaeological sites.

Seals grew into a distinct localized village following the expansion of coastal rail lines. In January 1894, the Florida Northern Railroad (soon absorbed into the Florida Central and Peninsular Railroad) constructed a corridor linking Kingsland and Woodbine, placing a station at Seals. During this era of regional development, Seals was one of several rural communities dotting the Camden County landscape, alongside Burnt Fort, Center Village, Kinlaw, Scarlett, Walker Swamp, Ceylon, and Satilla Bluff.

== Transportation ==
Seals serves as the northernmost terminus of the First Coast Railroad (reporting mark FCRD), a Class III shortline railroad owned and operated by Genesee & Wyoming.

The trackage was originally part of the Seaboard Air Line Railroad's main "S Line." Following successive corporate mergers that formed CSX Transportation, traffic was rerouted to parallel lines farther west. Consequently, CSX abandoned the segment of the S Line running north from Seals toward Bladen and Riceboro, physically removing the tracks north of Seals in 1990. In April 2005, CSX leased the remaining 31-mile (50 km) operational segment extending south from Seals into Northeast Florida to the First Coast Railroad, preserving the line for local industrial freight freight carriage.
