= Italia, Florida =

Unincorporated community in Florida, U.S.

Italia
- Unincorporated community
- Etymology: Named for a Florida marketing campaign promoting the state as "America's Italy"
- Location in Florida Italia (the United States)
- Coordinates: 30.6164°N 81.7172°W
- Country: United States
- State: Florida
- County: Nassau County
- Founded: 1882
- Founder: William MacWilliams

Government
  - Type: Unincorporated

Population (1885)
  - Total: 300+ (in 1,885)
- Time zone: UTC-5 (Eastern Time)
  - Summer (DST): UTC-4 (EDT)
- Florida Heritage Site

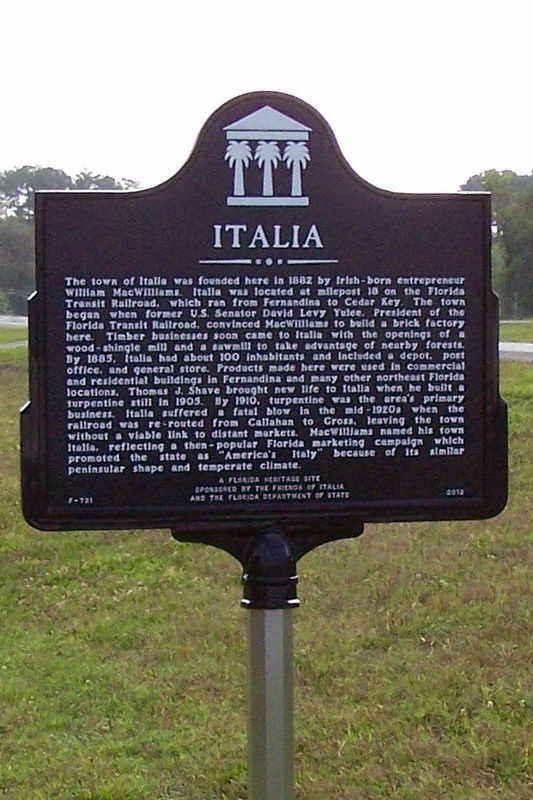
Florida State Historical Marker at Italia

Italia is an unincorporated community in Nassau County, Florida, United States, located near the center of the county. It is a Florida Heritage Site.

== Geography ==
Italia is located at 30°36′59″N 81°43′02″W (30.6164, -81.7172). It was built nearly 20 miles north of the historical center of Jacksonville.

== History ==
The village of Italia was founded in 1882 by Irish-born entrepreneur William MacWilliams (1840-1887). It was located at milepost 18 on the Florida Transit Railway, which ran from Fernandina on the Atlantic coast to Cedar Key on the Gulf of Mexico. The owner of the railroad, former Senator David Yulee, convinced MacWilliams to build a brick manufacturing facility here, and promised to buy the first million bricks. Bricks made at Italia were used in residential and commercial buildings in Fernandina and other locations in northeast Florida.

Italia soon included a depot, post office and general store. MacWilliams continued to promote the development of the village. Some Italians moved to live in the small village. In 1883, Nathan Levan built a wood-shingle mill that produced shingles for the roofs of homes and businesses throughout Nassau and Duval counties; Andrew J. Higginbotham built a sawmill. By 1885 the thriving village had over 300 inhabitants from Georgia, South Carolina, Maryland and Pennsylvania and a few Italian families from New England.

MacWilliams named the place "Italia" after a then-current Florida marketing campaign which promoted the state as "America's Italy" for its temperate climate and peninsular shape.

In 1905, Thomas J. Shave moved from Georgia and built a turpentine still. Within five years, turpentine was the primary product of the area. Shave later sold the turpentine still to Joseph P. and Frederick H. Higginbotham, son and grandson of the first sawmill owner.

Italia's main asset was always the railroad which carried the brick, lumber, shingles, turpentine and rosin to market. The fatal blow came in the 1920s when the railroad was diverted from Callahan to Gross, bypassing Italia. The businesses of Italia were no longer competitive and were forced to close or move to better locations. In the 1930s a new highway, State Route 200, was built through Italia, paralleling the old railroad from Yulee to Callahan, but it came too late to revive the economy of Italia.

Today, Italia is one of the many "ghost towns" that dot the landscape of Florida, but since the 1990s it is officially a Florida Heritage Site.

== See also ==
- Little Italy
