= Verdie, Florida =

Unincorporated community in Florida, U.S.

Verdie is an unincorporated community in Nassau County, Florida, United States. The community is located on US 301, in the southwestern part of the county.

== Geography ==
Verdie is located at 30°26′07″N 81°55′16″W between the communities of Ingle and Crawford. The elevation of Verdie is 69 ft. above sea level.
