= Ingle, Florida =

Unincorporated community in Florida

Ingle
- Unincorporated community
- Location in Florida
- Country: United States
- State: Florida
- County: Nassau County

Government
  - Type: Unincorporated
- Time zone: UTC-5 (Eastern Time)
  - Summer (DST): UTC-4 (EDT)

Ingle is an unincorporated community in Nassau County, Florida, United States. It is located on US 301, in the southwestern part of the county which is in the northeastern part of the state.

== Geography ==
Ingle is located at 30°25′08″N 81°55′40″W (30.4189, -81.9278).
