= O'Neil, Florida =

Unincorporated community in Florida, U.S.

O'Neil
- Unincorporated community
- Location of O'Neil in Florida
- Coordinates: 30°37′03″N 81°30′51″W
- Country: United States
- State: Florida
- County: Nassau
- Time zone: UTC-5 (EST)
  - Summer (DST): UTC-4 (EDT)
- Area code: 904

O'Neil is an unincorporated community in Nassau County, Florida, United States. It is located on State Road 200, to the east of Yulee and to the west of Fernandina Beach, between Lanceford Creek and Kingsley Creek.

== Geography ==
O'Neil is located at 30°37′03″N 81°30′51″W ( 30.6174596, -81.5142596).
