= Baldwin, Florida =

Town in the state of Florida, United States

- Town
- Town of Baldwin
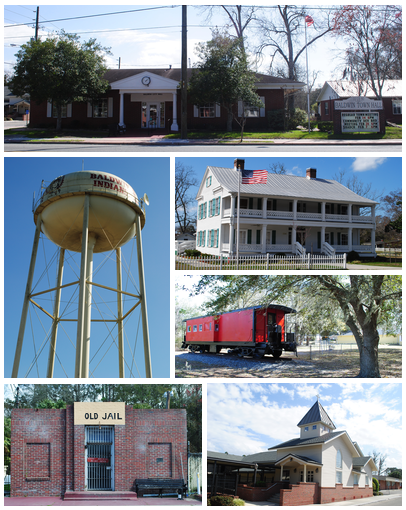
- From top, left to right: Baldwin Town Hall, Water tower, William Coleman House, Larry M. Carroll Memorial Park, Old Jail, First Baptist Church

- Location of Baldwin in Duval County, Florida.

- Location in Florida Baldwin, Florida (the United States) Baldwin, Florida (North America)
- Coordinates: 30°18′19″N 81°58′28″W
- Country: United States
- State: Florida
- County: Duval
- Settled (Thigpen): 1835-1860
- Incorporated (Town of Baldwin): 1876
- Reincorporated (Town of Baldwin): May 22, 1913

Government
  - Type: Mayor-Council
  - Mayor: Sean T. Lynch
  - Councilors: Manuel "Clyde" Dunlap, John A. Knoll, Harry D. Ervin, and Georgeann L. McKenna
  - Town Clerk: Lula M. Hill
  - Town Attorney: Zachary R. Roth

Area
  - Total: 2.02 sq mi (5.24 km^{2})
  - Land: 2.02 sq mi (5.23 km^{2})
  - Water: 0.0039 sq mi (0.01 km^{2})
- Elevation: 82 ft (25 m)

Population (2020)
  - Total: 1,396
  - Density: 691/sq mi (266.7/km^{2})
- Time zone: UTC-5 (Eastern (EST))
  - Summer (DST): UTC-4 (EDT)
- ZIP code: 32234
- Area codes: 904, 324
- FIPS code: 12-03250
- GNIS feature ID: 2405203
- Website: baldwinfl.govoffice2.com

Baldwin is a town in Duval County, Florida, United States. When the majority of communities in Duval County were consolidated with the city of Jacksonville in 1968, Baldwin, along with Jacksonville Beach, Atlantic Beach and Neptune Beach, remained partly independent. Like the other towns, it maintains its own municipal government, but its residents vote in the Jacksonville mayoral election and vote for the Jacksonville City Council. Unlike the others however, Baldwin no longer operates its own police force. Instead, since 2006 it engages with the Jacksonville Sheriff's Office for providing local law enforcement services. The population was 1,396 at the 2020 census, down from 1,425 at the 2010 census. It is part of the Jacksonville, Florida Metropolitan Statistical Area.

== History ==
The Town of Baldwin was first settled under the name of Thigpen in 1846. Mr. Thigpen had opened a tavern to benefit the stagecoach line at the crossroads of what is today Baldwin. He supplied horses for the stage and shelter and food for the passengers. The first railroad was built through Thigpen in 1857, with a second crossing it in 1859. The name was changed to Baldwin in honor of Abel Seymour Baldwin, the president of the Florida, Atlantic and Gulf Central Railroad, a railroad that ran from Lake City to Jacksonville. Further development in Baldwin led to the establishment of a telegraphic line running from Jacksonville to Baldwin. Baldwin lies between Macclenny and Jacksonville.

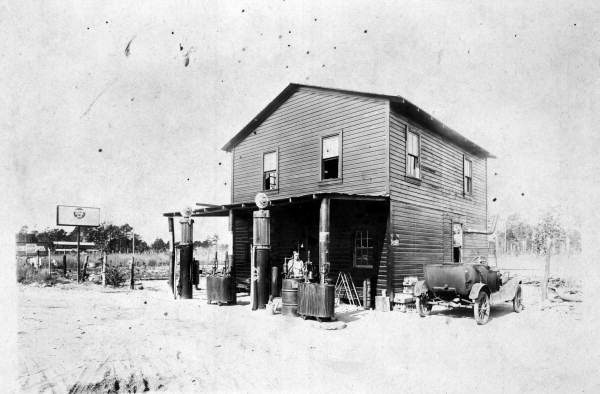
A country store with gas pumps in 1926 in Baldwin.

During the Civil War, Baldwin was captured by Federal forces early in 1864. Northern troops and correspondents noted that the citizens of Baldwin were "wretchedly poor."

On August 10, 1864, a skirmish occurred between a Confederate cavalry and the 102nd Regiment United States Colored Troops. A section of railroad track was destroyed by the Union Army troops. Two days later the Federals dispatched cavalry troops from Baldwin to drive Confederate forces back. One Federal soldier was killed and four were captured in the process. Baldwin was then burned down by the Federals. From 1865 to 1875 Baldwin was rebuilt reaching a population of 250.

Although it was officially incorporated as a municipality in 1876, the town was formally reincorporated under the Florida's municipal charter on May 22, 1913.

In 1947, the original school building serving the white population burned to the ground. There was no fire department to control it, and it was completely destroyed. The students from the school were temporarily housed in a variety of public buildings, including churches and the city hall. Later, barracks buildings from nearby army training base Camp Blanding were moved to the site of the burned school, where classes continued for about two years while a new school was being built. A school for the black population was located in a building located near the old ice plant that served the railroad. The school was occupied for a number of years after the new white school was built.

Florida State law, in 1948, required new school buildings be placed on parcels not less than 10 acres (40,000 m^{2}) in size. As the property under the existing school was not large enough, a site on Mill Street was chosen. A $50,000 school was erected during the winter and summers of 1948 and 1949. In 1950, an auditorium was completed. At that time the school enrollment was 365. In 1964, a Music Suite was added.

In 1965, Baldwin became the first Duval County school to be integrated.

== Geography ==
According to the United States Census Bureau, the town has a total area of 2.0 square miles (5.3 km^{2}), all land. Baldwin is an enclave of Jacksonville.

=== Climate ===
The climate in this area is characterized by hot, humid summers and generally mild winters. According to the Köppen climate classification, the Town of Baldwin has a humid subtropical climate zone (Cfa).

== Demographics ==
Historical population
Census	Pop.	Note	%±
1880	240		—
1920	470		—
1930	749		59.4%
1940	1,002		33.8%
1950	1,048		4.6%
1960	1,272		21.4%
1970	1,408		10.7%
1980	1,526		8.4%
1990	1,450		−5.0%
2000	1,634		12.7%
2010	1,425		−12.8%
2020	1,396		−2.0%
U.S. Decennial Census; 2013 Estimate

=== Racial and ethnic composition ===
Baldwin racial composition (Hispanics excluded from racial categories) (NH = Non-Hispanic)
Race	Pop 2010	Pop 2020	% 2010	% 2020
White (NH)	1,030	938	72.28%	67.19%
Black or African American (NH)	307	308	21.54%	22.06%
Native American or Alaska Native (NH)	3	4	0.21%	0.29%
Asian (NH)	4	0	0.28%	0.00%
Pacific Islander or Native Hawaiian (NH)	0	1	0.00%	0.07%
Some other race (NH)	1	13	0.07%	0.93%
Two or more races/Multiracial (NH)	48	68	3.37%	4.87%
Hispanic or Latino (any race)	32	64	2.25%	4.58%
Total	1,425	1,396		

=== 2020 census ===
As of the 2020 census, Baldwin had a population of 1,396. The median age was 40.0 years. 24.5% of residents were under the age of 18 and 19.8% of residents were 65 years of age or older. For every 100 females, there were 86.9 males, and for every 100 females age 18 and over there were 81.4 males age 18 and over.

0.0% of residents lived in urban areas, while 100.0% lived in rural areas.

There were 588 households in Baldwin, of which 32.0% had children under the age of 18 living in them. Of all households, 32.8% were married-couple households, 22.8% were households with a male householder and no spouse or partner present, and 35.9% were households with a female householder and no spouse or partner present. About 35.3% of all households were made up of individuals and 15.7% had someone living alone who was 65 years of age or older.

There were 666 housing units, of which 11.7% were vacant. The homeowner vacancy rate was 2.5% and the rental vacancy rate was 11.0%.

According to 2020 American Community Survey 5-year estimates, there were 391 families residing in the town.

=== 2010 census ===
As of the 2010 United States census, there were 1,425 people, 623 households, and 380 families residing in the town.

=== 2000 census ===
As of the census of 2000, there were 1,634 people, 628 households, and 432 families residing in the town. The population density was 767.3 inhabitants per square mile (296.3/km^{2}). There were 702 housing units at an average density of 329.6 per square mile (127.3/km^{2}). The racial makeup of the town was 67.07% White, 30.91% African American, 0.18% Native American, 0.86% Asian, 0.06% Pacific Islander, 0.06% from other races, and 0.86% from two or more races. Hispanic or Latino of any race were 0.80% of the population.

In 2000, there were 628 households, out of which 35.2% had children under the age of 18 living with them, 41.2% were married couples living together, 22.5% had a female householder with no husband present, and 31.2% were non-families. 27.5% of all households were made up of individuals, and 8.6% had someone living alone who was 65 years of age or older. The average household size was 2.60 and the average family size was 3.16.

In 2000, in the town, the population was spread out, with 29.3% under the age of 18, 10.2% from 18 to 24, 27.4% from 25 to 44, 22.3% from 45 to 64, and 10.7% who were 65 years of age or older. The median age was 34 years. For every 100 females, there were 86.7 males. For every 100 females age 18 and over, there were 82.5 males.

In 2000, the median income for a household in the town was $28,603, and the median income for a family was $31,023. Males had a median income of $28,350 versus $23,056 for females. The per capita income for the town was $13,560. About 17.6% of families and 17.7% of the population were below the poverty line, including 24.8% of those under age 18 and 12.9% of those age 65 or over.

== Government and politics ==
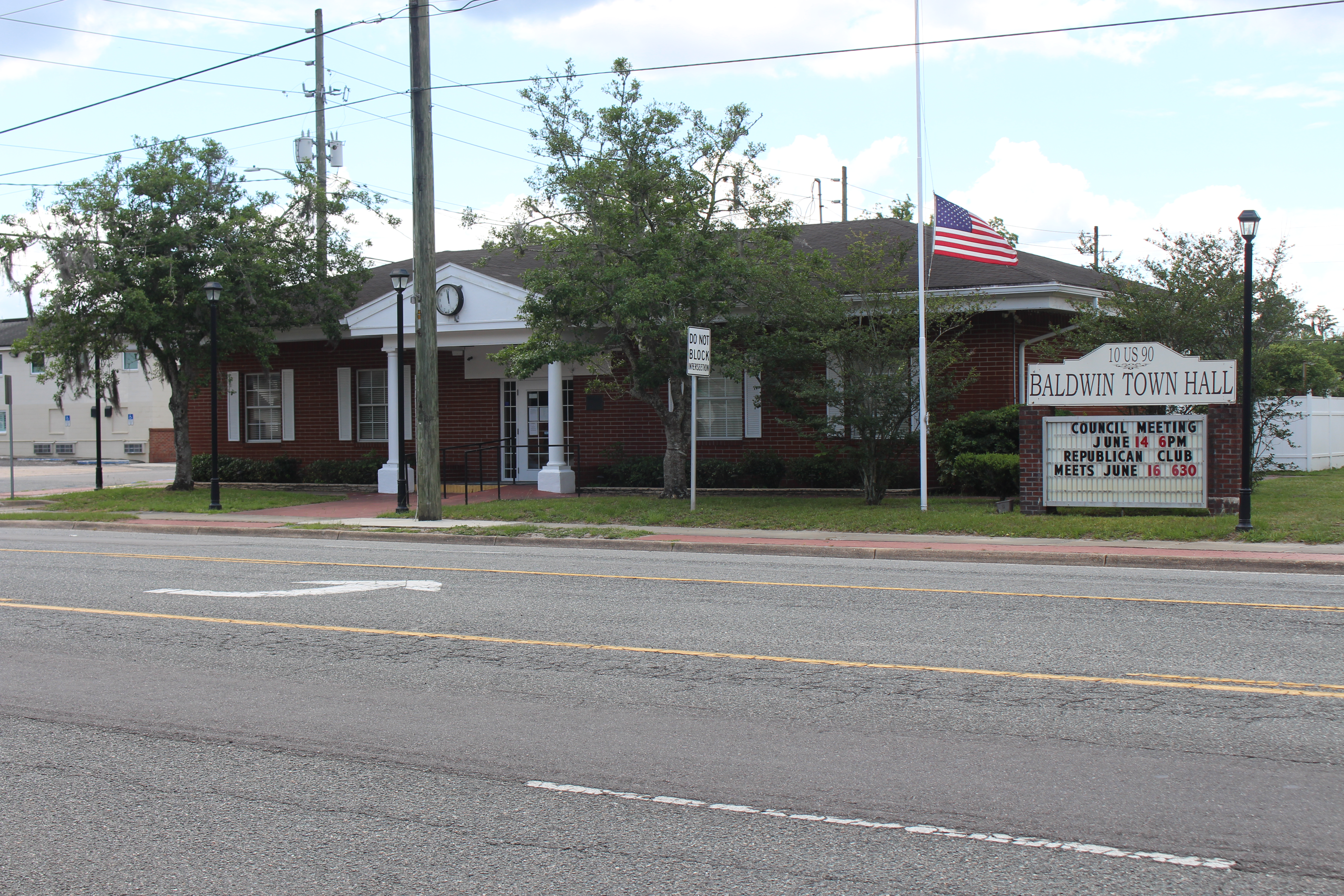
Baldwin Town Hall

The municipality operated a 10,000-square-foot (930 m^{2}) supermarket that opened on September 20, 2019, in response to the closure of the last remaining private grocery store, an IGA, in 2018; the county market was located in the former IGA building, which post-2018 prospective small business supermarket owners found too large and corporate chains found too small. The store closed down in March 2024. The nearest privately run supermarkets are in Macclenny and Jacksonville, and the Dollar General lacks fresh food.

In the 2016 U.S. presidential election, 68% of the residents selected Donald Trump.

== Transportation ==
Baldwin is the terminus of three CSX subdivisions: the western terminus of the Jacksonville Terminal Subdivision, the northern terminus of the Wildwood Subdivision and the southern terminus of the Callahan Subdivision.

The Florida Gulf & Atlantic Railroad acquired the former CSX Tallahassee Subdivision and P&A Subdivision from Pensacola to Baldwin on June 1, 2019. CSX retained trackage rights on that route.

No passenger trains stop in Baldwin, but Amtrak's Palmetto train served the Wildwood Subdivision until November 2004, and the Sunset Limited served the Tallahassee and Jacksonville Terminal Subdivisions until Hurricane Katrina ravaged the Gulf Coast in 2005. Additionally, the Jacksonville-Baldwin Rail Trail was a former Atlantic Coast Line Railroad line that was abandoned by CSX in 1992.

=== Major highways ===
- I-10
- US 90
- US 301
- US 301 Byp.

== Culture ==
As of 2019 eleven churches are in the area.

== Education ==
Duval County Public Schools operates area public schools, including Mamie Agnes Jones Elementary School and Baldwin Middle-Senior High School.
