= U.S. Route 301 in Florida =

Highway in Florida

U.S. Highway 301
- US 301 highlighted in red

Route information
- Auxiliary route of US 1
- Maintained by FDOT
- Length: 269.316 mi (433.422 km)
- Existed: 1949–present

Major junctions
- South end: US 41 in Sarasota
- I-75 near Tampa; SR 618 near Tampa; I-4 / US 92 near Tampa; SR 52 in Dade City; Florida's Turnpike near Wildwood; SR 40 in Ocala; SR 100 in Starke; I-10 near Baldwin; US 90 in Baldwin; SR A1A / SR 200 in Callahan
- North end: US 1 / US 23 / US 301 / SR 4 / SR 15 south of Folkston, Georgia

Location
- Country: United States
- State: Florida
- Counties: Sarasota, Manatee, Hillsborough, Pasco, Hernando, Sumter, Marion, Alachua, Bradford, Clay, Duval, Nassau

Highway system
- United States Numbered Highway System; List; Special; Divided; Florida State Highway System; Interstate; US; State; Former; Pre‑1945; Toll; Scenic
← SR 300	→ SR 312
← SR 682	SR 683	→ SR 684

U.S. Route 301 (US 301) in Florida runs from the Sarasota-Bradenton-Venice, Florida Metropolitan Statistical Area northeast to the Greater Jacksonville Metropolitan Area. The road is a spur of U.S. Route 1, which it intersects in Callahan.

US 301 carries the hidden state road designations of State Road 683 from Sarasota to US 41 in Bradenton, SR 55 from Bradenton to Palmetto, SR 43 from US 41 in Palmetto to US 92 east of Tampa, SR 41 from US 92 to Zephyrhills, SR 39 from Zephyrhills to US 98 south of Dade City, State Road 35 from US 98 to Belleview (except SR 533 around downtown Dade City), SR 500 from Belleview to Ocala, SR 200 from Ocala to Callahan and SR 15 from Callahan to the Georgia border, south of Folkston, Georgia.

Concurrencies include U.S. 41 between Bradenton and Palmetto, U.S. 98 between Clinton Heights (near Dade City) and Trilacoochee (formerly known as Moss Town), US 27 between Belleview and Ocala, US 441 between Belleview and Sparr, US 90 in Baldwin, and U.S. 1 and US 23 north of Callahan.

== Route description ==
=== Sarasota through Hillsborough County ===
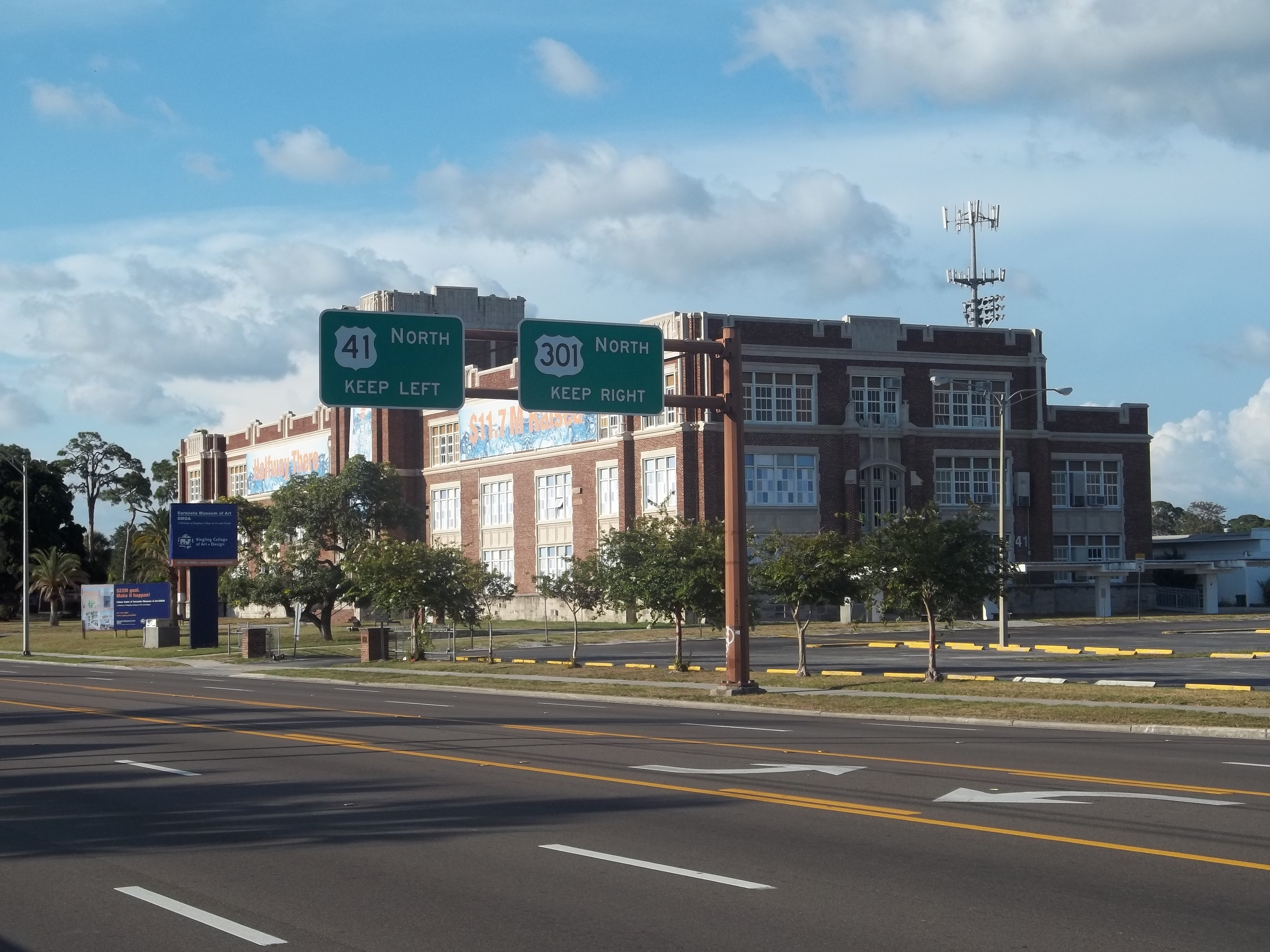
Looking north towards the US 41/301 concurrency in Sarasota

US 301 begins its northward journey at an intersection with U.S. Route 41 along Washington Boulevard in Sarasota. The first state highway it intersects with is SR 780. On the Sarasota-Manatee County line, it also intersects with CR 610, which takes commuters from Ringling College of Art and Design, University of South Florida's Sarasota/Manatee Campus, New College of Florida, and Sarasota-Bradenton International Airport to Interstate 75. The next major intersection is SR 70, and after this, the road curves northwest before it eventually joins US 41(Hidden SR 55) again in southern Bradenton where they briefly overlap each other as they cross the Manatee River.

US 301 makes a sharp right turn onto SR 43 at a diamond interchange, then crosses I-75 in Ellenton at Exit 224. Just north of the intersection of State Road 62, the road passes by the Florida Gulf Coast Railroad Museum and then intersects CR 683 (Moccasin Wallow Road). After the road crosses the Manatee-Hillsborough County Line, it passes by the Little Manatee River State Park, then intersects State Road 674, and shares a brief overlap with CR 672 between Balm Road and Big Bend Road.

North of the intersection with Gibsonton Drive, and over the Alafia River in Riverview, US 301 makes another turn to the northwest, where it crosses I-75 again near Brandon at Exit 254. Beyond that, all access to I-75 is available from roads that cross US 301 in one way or another, the nearest of which being the Lee Roy Selmon Expressway. Shortly before a diamond interchange with the Selmon Expressway, US 301 intersects with SR 676 at Causeway Boulevard, serving as the route's eastern terminus and providing access to US 41 and US Bus 41. The first major intersection north of the Selmon Expressway is with SR 60 at Adamo Drive.

At Six Mile Creek, an overpass takes US 301 over the tracks of CSX's "A-line", one of the railroad company's main lines through Florida (also used by Amtrak's Silver Star passenger trains), and CR 574, which is only accessible from local connecting roads. It then crosses the first bridge over the Tampa Bypass Canal before intersecting SR 574 in East Lake-Orient Park. At the Florida State Fairgrounds, US 301 has a parclo interchange with Interstate 4 and U.S. Route 92 (SR 600). A reconstruction project took place in the early-2000s with provisions for a future ramp from westbound US 92, that are currently being obstructed by the Tampa Bypass Canal and land owned by the Vandenberg Airport. Near the northern end of Vandenberg Airport, US 301 crosses over a flood channel that runs between the Hillsborough River and Tampa Bypass Canal on the southern border of Temple Terrace.

Between Temple Terrace and Thonotosassa, the hidden SR 43 leaves US 301 and joins County Road 580 at Harney Road, and the new hidden road becomes SR 41. Former sections of Harney Road are on hills on the northwest and northeast corners, both of which were designed to go around a former railroad bridge for a line that no longer exists. After crossing under I-75 with no access for the last time, and the Tampa Bypass Canal again shortly afterwards, US 301 encounters the eastern terminus of SR 582 and its hidden County extension, County Road 582.

County Road 43 ends at US 301 in Thonotosassa along Harney Road, and US 301 loses more of its easterly trajection. Here, it serves as the northern terminus of Mango Road, and later Stacy Road, Sargeant Wilderness Memorial Park, and extension of Hillsborough River State Park. After passing by a field used for the Tampa Machinery Auctions, US 301 officially runs along the eastern end of Hillsborough River State Park, which it will eventually enter. The same former railroad line that was encountered near Harney Road is visible along the east side of US 301 throughout the park and beyond. The last moderate intersection US 301 encounters before finally entering the park is the northern terminus of McIntosh Road. One residential area can be found on a minor side road off to the left, but the rest of the road is surrounded by parkland. US 301 leaves the park almost as instantly as it crosses the Pasco County line.

=== Pasco County ===
After US 301 enters Pasco County, a slight curve to the right is a clear indication that 301 is entering Zephyrhills. Here, the road is known as Fort King Highway and Gall Boulevard depending on the location. Across from the fields of Festival Park, US 301 serves as the eastern terminus of SR 56, and the first major intersection in Pasco County. The next intersection is with Chancey Road which eventually becomes County Road 535. SR 39 intersects with US 301 from the southeast. However, instead of terminating at Route 301, it becomes a hidden route north of the intersection and both roads head straight north again. This trajectory is short lived though when some local traffic is rerouted along 7th Street, and both roads intersect South Avenue before moving slightly northwest.

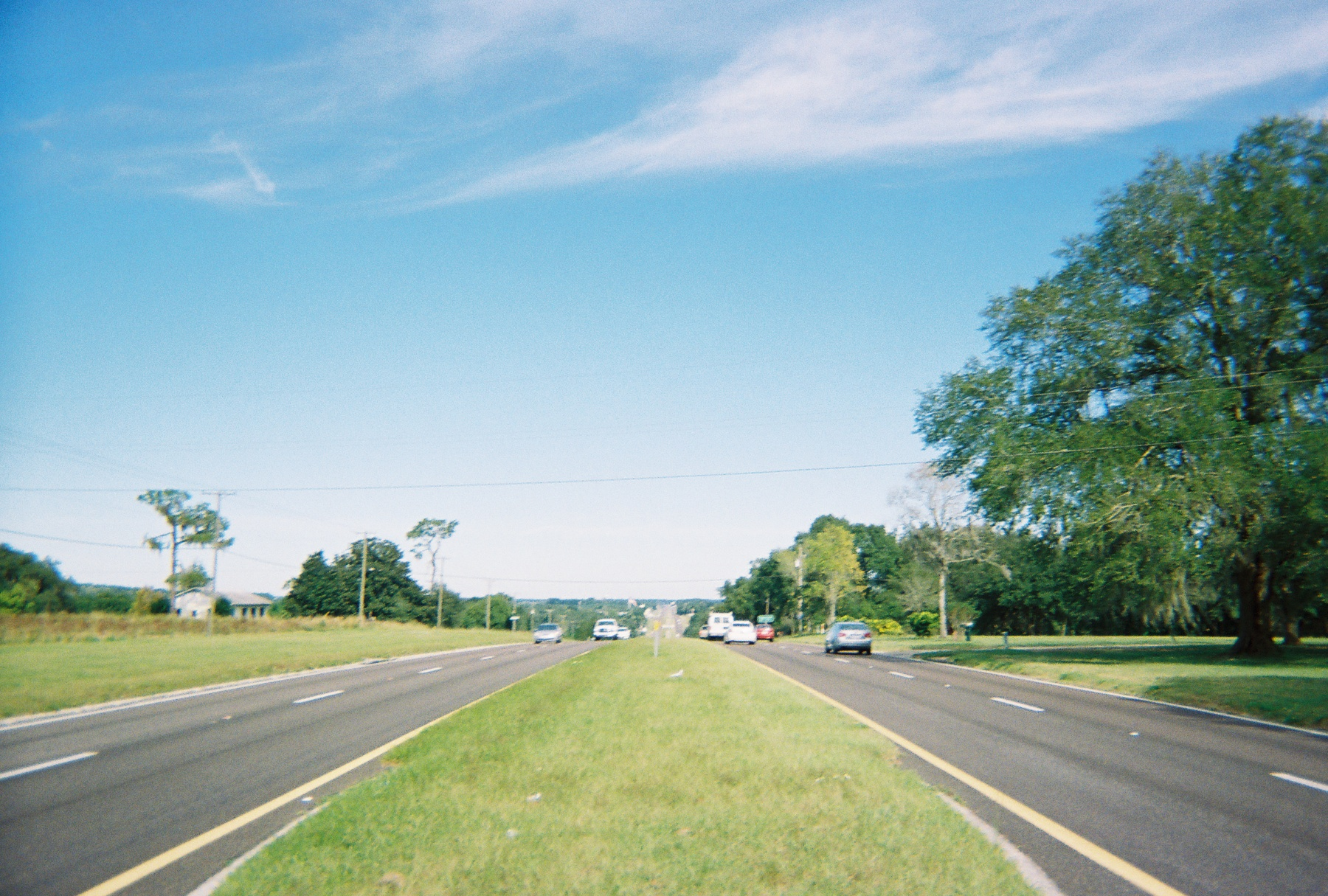
On top of the hills between Dade City and Zephyrhills

Downtown Zephyrhills is where US 301 serves as what would appear to be the eastern terminus of SR 54, even though Fifth Avenue continues east of SR 54. Originally SR 54 extended east of US 301 along Fifth Avenue and then to 12th Street before turning back east again at Eiland Boulevard. In more recent times however, some maps have indicated that it serves as a third hidden route along US 301. Southbound motorists on US 301 have been encouraged to access SR 54 through 6th Street in recent years. After North Avenue, US 301 curves to the northeast as SR 41 leaves Route 301 to the northwest as County Road 41, along Fort King Road. The rest of 301 is known as Gall Boulevard until it moves deep into Dade City. After the curve to the northeast ends the road intersects County Road 54, a county bypass and extension of SR 54 that leads to US 98 (SR 700) on the Pasco-Polk County line. From there, US 301 runs along a series of steep hills as a four-lane divided highway with median openings that lack left-turn lanes until it reaches US 98 and the US 98-301 overlap begins. Immediately after this, the road intersects SR 52 in Clinton Heights (near Dade City). While some of the median openings are still missing left-turn lanes, and is briefly replaced by a center left-turn lane, the road becomes much more level at this point.

In February 2007, US 98-301 was realigned to the former truck route, which is two lanes wide as of this writing. Efforts to widen the road to four lanes has met stiff opposition from both the public and the city. The former truck route and old US 98-301, which is now SR 39 as well as hidden state routes hidden SRs 35–700, split from each other at an at-grade interchange. A local east–west street takes motorists to southbound County Road 35 Alternate. At the intersection of ALT CR 35 itself, the road moves from northeast back to northwest again, and runs along the CSX S-Line, where it encounters the eastern terminus of CR 52 Alt and the Dade City Atlantic Coast Line Railroad Depot.

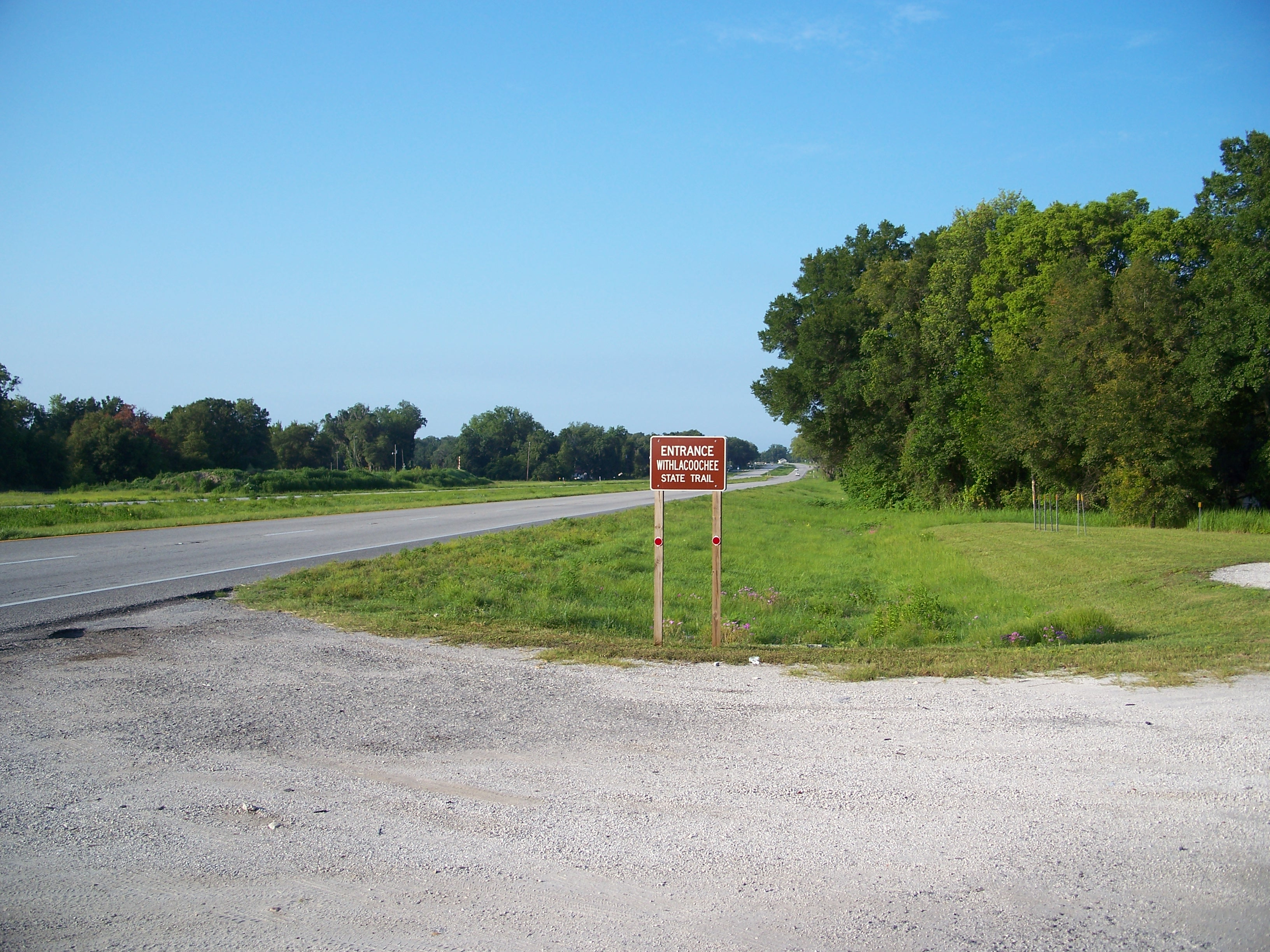
Owensboro Junction Trailhead

US 98 & 301 reunite with the former route, near a former citrus plant. The first intersection after this is eastern County Road 578 and the next one is at the northern border of the former citrus plant that leads to the Pioneer Florida Museum. As with the segment between Zephyrhills and Dade City, the road is a hilly four-lane divided highway with median openings that lack left-turn lanes, but the hills aren't as steep, and the road isn't as straight. After passing by the drive-in movie theater, US 98-301 intersection with Payne Road which was part of the former County Road 35B, There are some trailer parks, a golf course, and small motels in this segment. A sure sign the segment is about to end, is when it passed by the Owensboro Junction Trailhead, of the Withlacoochee State Trail. This was once a former junction between the Atlantic Coast Line and Seaboard Air Line Railroads, until both were merged into the Seaboard Coast Line and the segments that crossed Routes 98 & 301 were abandoned. US 98 leaves US 301 in Trilacoochee, veering to the northwest and taking hidden State Roads 39 and 700 with it. State Road 35 becomes the sole hidden state route as the road narrows down to two lanes before approaching State Road 575 and CR 575 in Lacoochee. It remains a two-lane road even after it crosses the border with Hernando County, Florida and over the Withlacoochee River.

=== Hernando to Marion counties ===
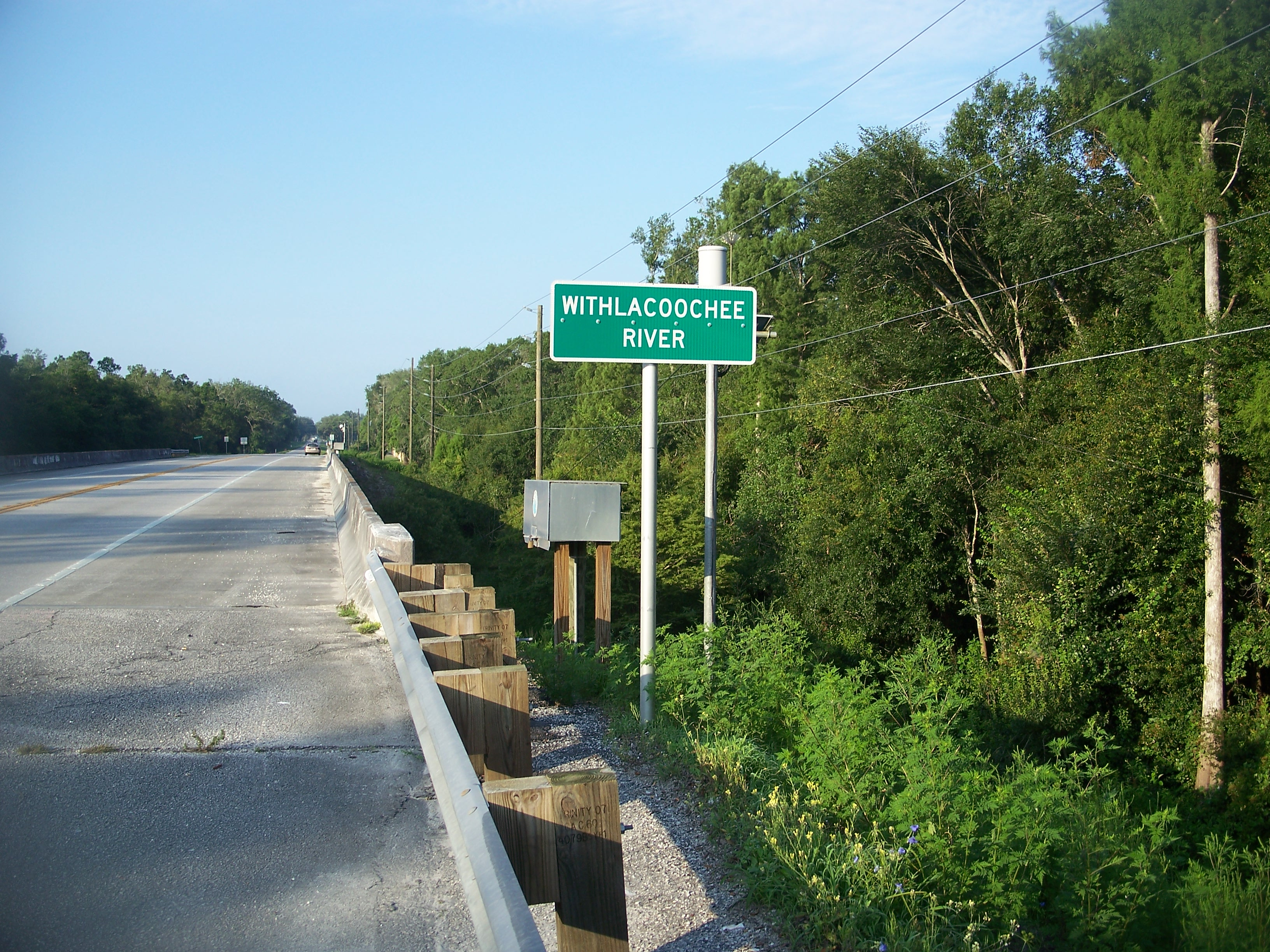
Withlacoochee River, forming the Hernando/Pasco County line

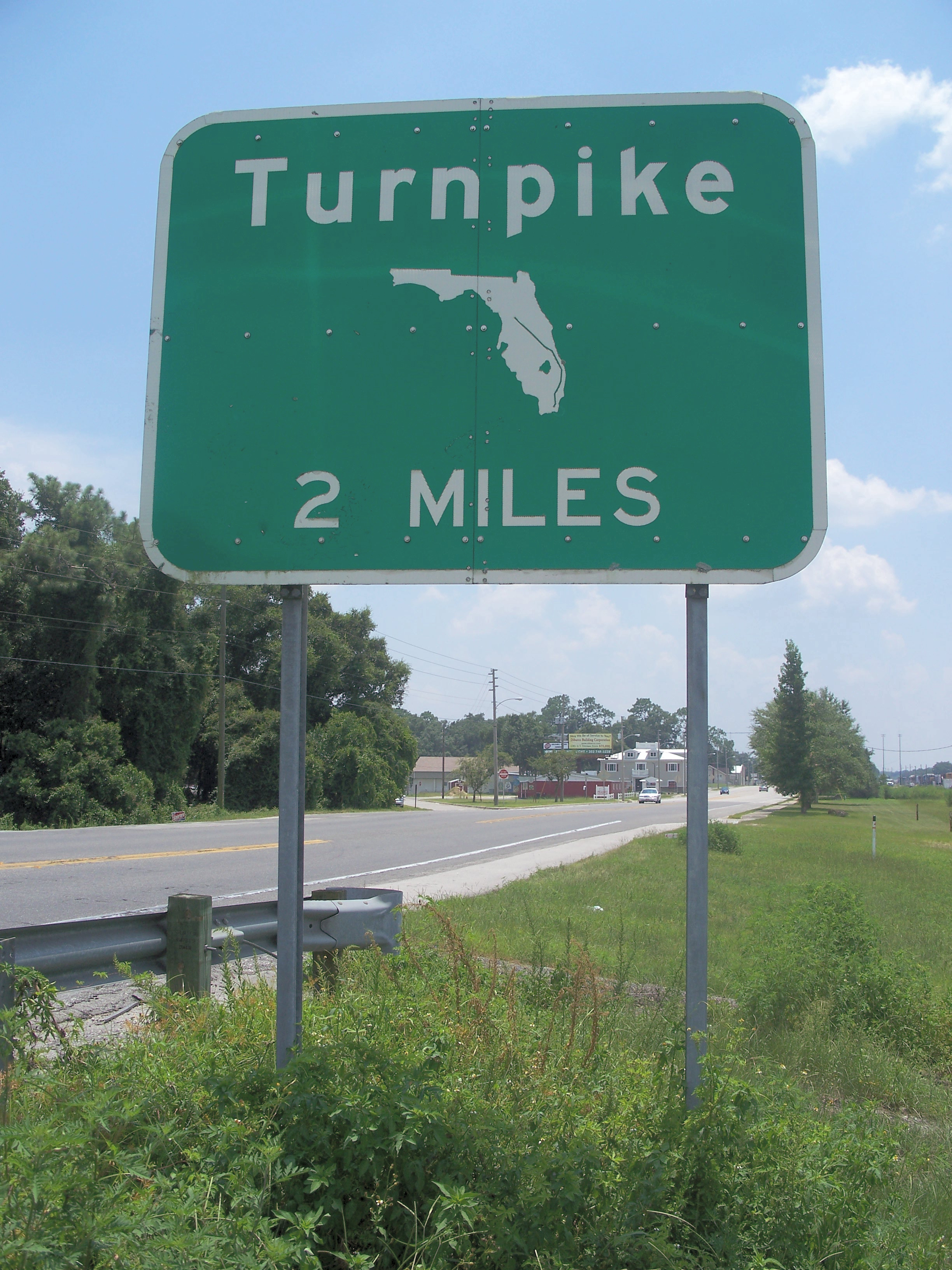
US 301 two miles north of Florida's Turnpike

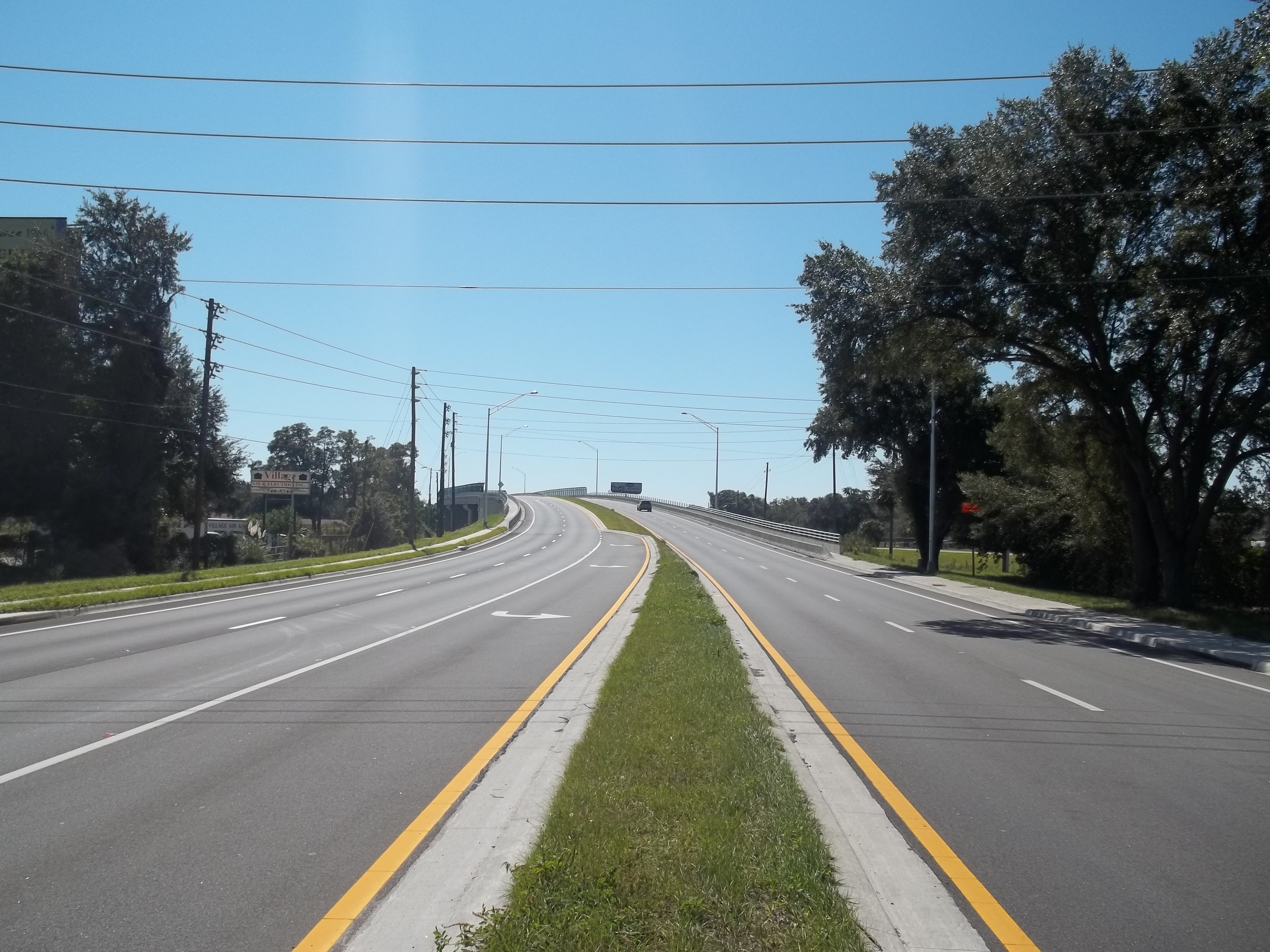
Wildwood, looking south at the bridge over the CSX rail tracks

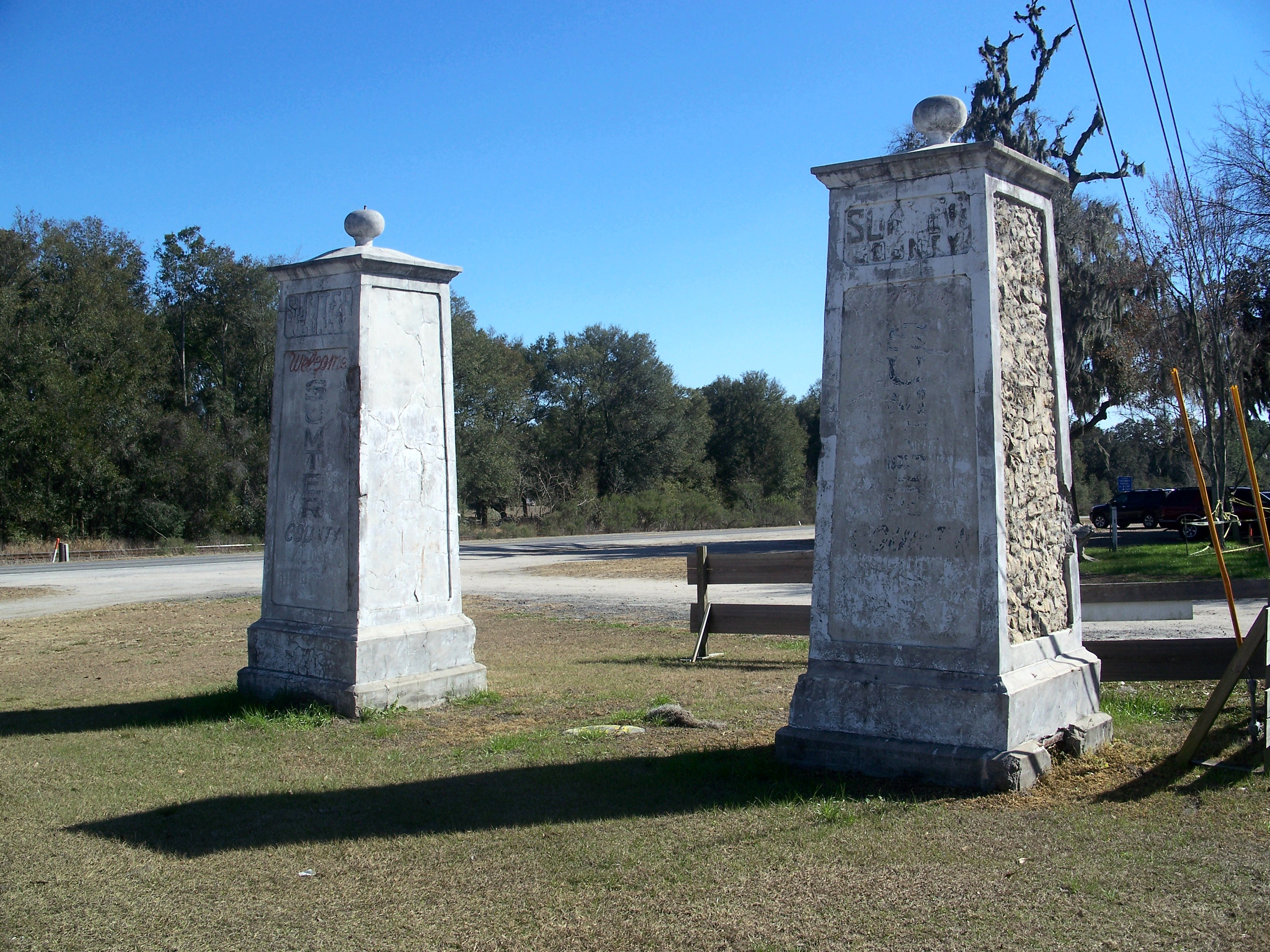
Stone posts that say "Welcome to Sumter County", by US 301 at the Marion-Sumter county line

In Hernando County, US 301 continues its two-lane rural surroundings until it approaches SR 50 in Ridge Manor, which while hardly urban, contains some local businesses, and a large gas station, convenience store and car wash on the northeast corner. North of the Whispering Oaks Country Club, a gated community near SR 50, US 301 passes by random intersections of dirt roads, many of which are part of local deed-restricted communities.

US 301 enters Sumter County by crossing over the Little Withlacoochee River, where it shortly enters the unincorporated community of Croom-a-Coochee, runs parallel to the CSX's S-Line, and intersects with County Road 675. In St. Catherine, 301 intersects with CR 673, which leads to local campgrounds before reaching I-75, and almost instantly CR 478, which leads to Webster and Center Hill.

In Bushnell, US 301 becomes Main Street. The first main intersection there is County Road 476 (Seminole Avenue), a road that runs from northwestern Hernando County to north of Webster. CR 48 shares a hidden concurrency with US 301, that's not so hidden when it turns onto CR 476. Sumter County Road 48 runs north towards West Belt Avenue, taking the DeSoto Trail with it, while US 301 turns east on East Noble Avenue, and crosses CSX's S-Line, where it once shared a brief concurrency with CR 48 until that designation turned south onto Florida Avenue on its way to Lake County. From there, Route 301 shares an even shorter concurrency with County Road 476, until it curves back north.

US 301 passes by the ground of Lake-Sumter Community College's Sumter Campus in Sumterville. Shortly after this, US 301 intersects County Road 470, and both roads share a concurrency. The north end of SR 471 is encountered after this, and then the concurrency with County Road 470 breaks away to head east towards Okahumpka. In Coleman US 301 intersects with an abandoned railroad right-of-way that carried the SAL/Amtrak Silver Meteor until 1988. At this point, the road is briefly named South Commercial Street until it intersects with Warm Springs Avenue (County Road 514) and then heads east along Warm Springs Avenue. The road curves north again at the intersection of County Road 468.

Before US 301 enters Wildwood, signs give advanced warnings of the road's approach to the next to last interchange for Florida's Turnpike. Prior to this interchange, US 301 becomes a four-lane highway, which is sometimes divided. The next major intersection is SR 44, and both lead to I-75. Wildwood has also been referred to as "The Crossroads of Florida" due to this as well as the former Wildwood Amtrak Station, which now serves as a CSX maintenance yard. Until the 2010s US 301 narrowed back down to a two-lane highway with right-of-ways for future expansion on either sides north of the bridge. After entering Marion County, it remains a divided highway as it intersects County Road 42 in Dallas, only to return to the two-lane road south of Wildwood. The stretch along the Marion-Sumter county line serves as the unofficial western boundary of The Villages, the large Central Florida retirement community.

North of Summerfield, the road takes a slight curve to the northwest and then becomes a divided four-lane highway before curving back north again. The road remains no less than four lanes wide throughout the rest of Marion County, although just as in Pasco County, the median is missing left-turn lanes at many of the intersections.

Within Belleview, the road curves more to the west and after the intersection with US 27–441 (SR 25–500) is co-signed with these routes for a few blocks. However SR 35 turns right at the current eastern terminus of CR 484, and US 27-301-441's new secret route becomes SR 25–500. After that the road curves more to the north again. Near the right of way for the formerly proposed Cross Florida Barge Canal, the median for the road widens, but narrows back down to normal again. Before it does, however, it intersects CR 328, where a police station exists between the median. Supports for a bridge that was intended to run over the canal exist behind the police station. To the west of this intersection is the Santos Trailhead of the Cross Florida Greenway.

=== Ocala and points north ===
Before US 27-301-441 enters Ocala, it veers off to the left at an intersection with County Road Old 441 (Southeast Lake Weir Avenue), a former segment of US 441 that eventually leads to Ocala Union Station. The first major intersection after this is 31st Street. Then it crosses under a railroad bridge before reaching the City Limits and the intersections with the northern terminus of CR 475 and crossing SR 464 (17th Street). US 27-301-441 intersects with SR 200 (becoming the new hidden state road until US 301 reaches US 1-23). The highway reaches the heart of Ocala at the intersection with SR 40 (West Silver Springs Boulevard). After this, the road crosses a railroad bridge west of Ocala Union Station. Five blocks later, US 27 leaves the US 301-441 overlap and takes SR 500 with it as they head northwest towards Williston, Perry, Tallahassee, and points north. Before US 301-441 leaves Ocala, it has an intersection with County Road 200A (Northwest 20th Street), which runs east and then north. This road was the former State Road 200A and decommissioned U.S. Route 301 Alternate.

Another county alternate of a state highway that the road intersects with is CR 25A (Northwest Gainesville Road), which runs northwest through towns such as Zuber, Lowell, and Reddick. East of Zuber, the road intersects SR 326, which originally had a short concurrency, but now directly crosses US 301-441. South of the intersection with CR 329 is an interchange with U.S. Route 441 near Sparr, where the US 301-441 concurrency ends. US 441 moves northwest towards Gainesville, while US 301 moves northeast.

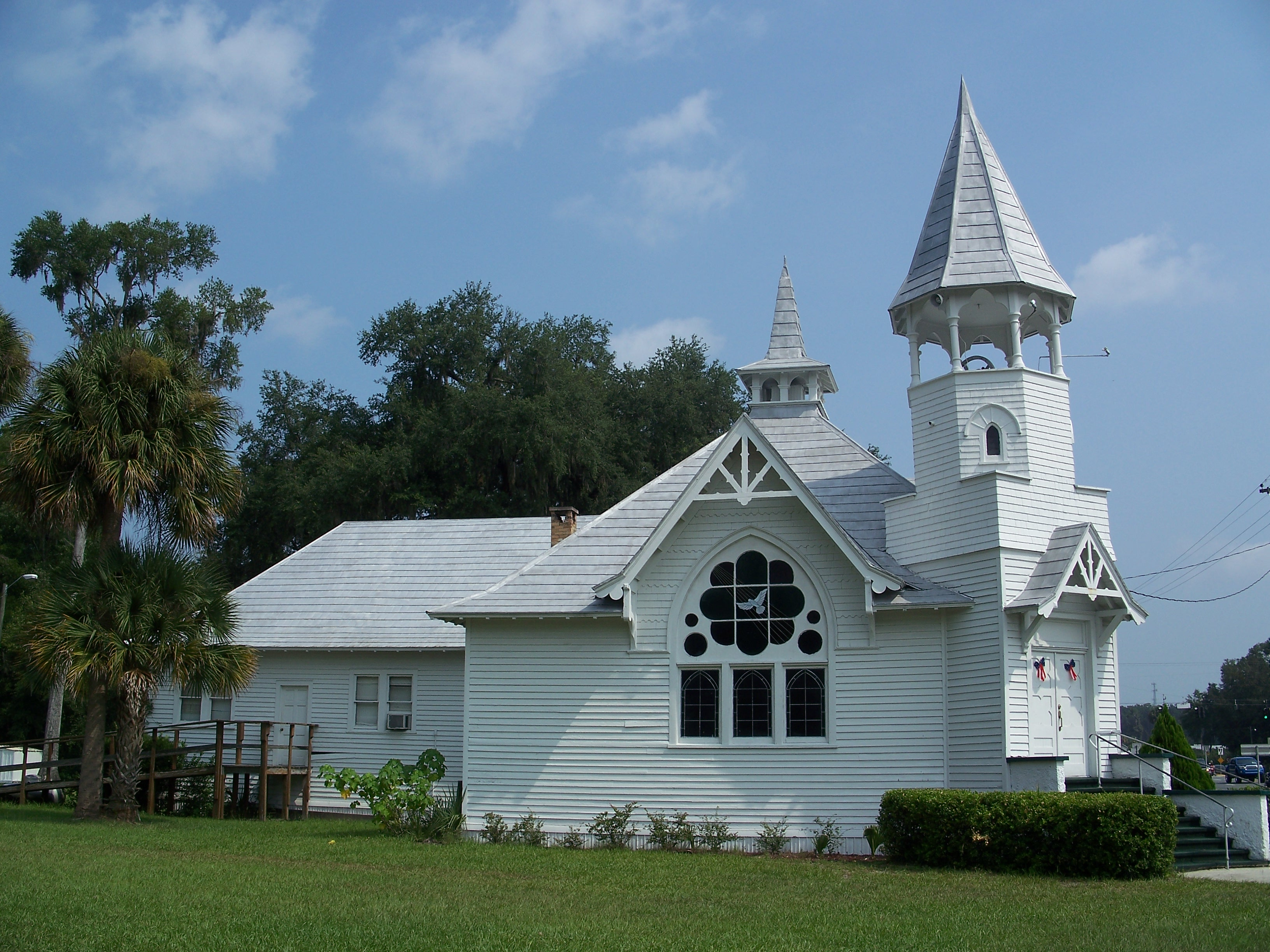
First Baptist Church, at the U.S. 301/CR 318 intersection in Citra

In Citra, US 301 intersects with the north end of CR 200A (Northeast Jacksonville Road), but another short former segment (Northeast 19th Terrace) appears on the opposite side before the road passes by the historic Melton-Shands House and intersects with CR 318. After US 301 crosses the Alachua County Line it runs along a four-lane causeway through marshland before entering Island Grove, where the road intersects with another former section (Southeast 201st Terrace) and CR 325, which leads to Marjorie Kinnan Rawlings Historic State Park. From there, the road makes a slight curve to the right to cross over the railroad line. Both the tracks and the road run along the east coast of Lochloosa Lake in Lochloosa. The interchange with SR 20 in Hawthorne, also includes the side road Southeast 221st Street / Johnson Street, as well as the previously mentioned railroad line in between that side road and US 301. Intersections with CR 1474 in Campville and SR 26 in Orange Heights are at-grade interchanges, and the railroad line breaks away from the road moving straight north. US 301 would head back to the northwest in Shenks, where it would otherwise take drivers straight into Lake Altho and those tracks can be found again, beneath the interchange with SR 24 in Waldo.

Since US 301 is a popular short cut between Northeastern Florida and the Gulf Coast region, a number of towns along the road have been notorious speed traps. The speed limit drops from 65 mph to 30 mph in a matter of a few hundred feet. Many have accused the police in Waldo, Starke, Lawtey, and others of giving tickets simply to raise money. The American Automobile Association has strongly advised motorists to avoid this stretch of the road.

North of Waldo, US 301 crosses Bradford County Line. The first moderate intersection the road encounters is the southern terminus of County Road 221, which northbound traffic can access from a connecting ramp. East of Hampton Lake, it intersects CR 18 between Hampton and Hampton Beach. Upon entering Starke, US 301 gains the name Walnut Street; after it crosses a set of railroad tracks, it crosses over onto Temple Avenue. From there, the road intersects SR 100 (Madison Street), and a block later the unmarked SR 230 (Call Street), where it passes the Old Bradford County Courthouse, and serves as part of the boundary for the Call Street Historic District. The next major intersection in Starke is SR 16 (Brownlee Street).

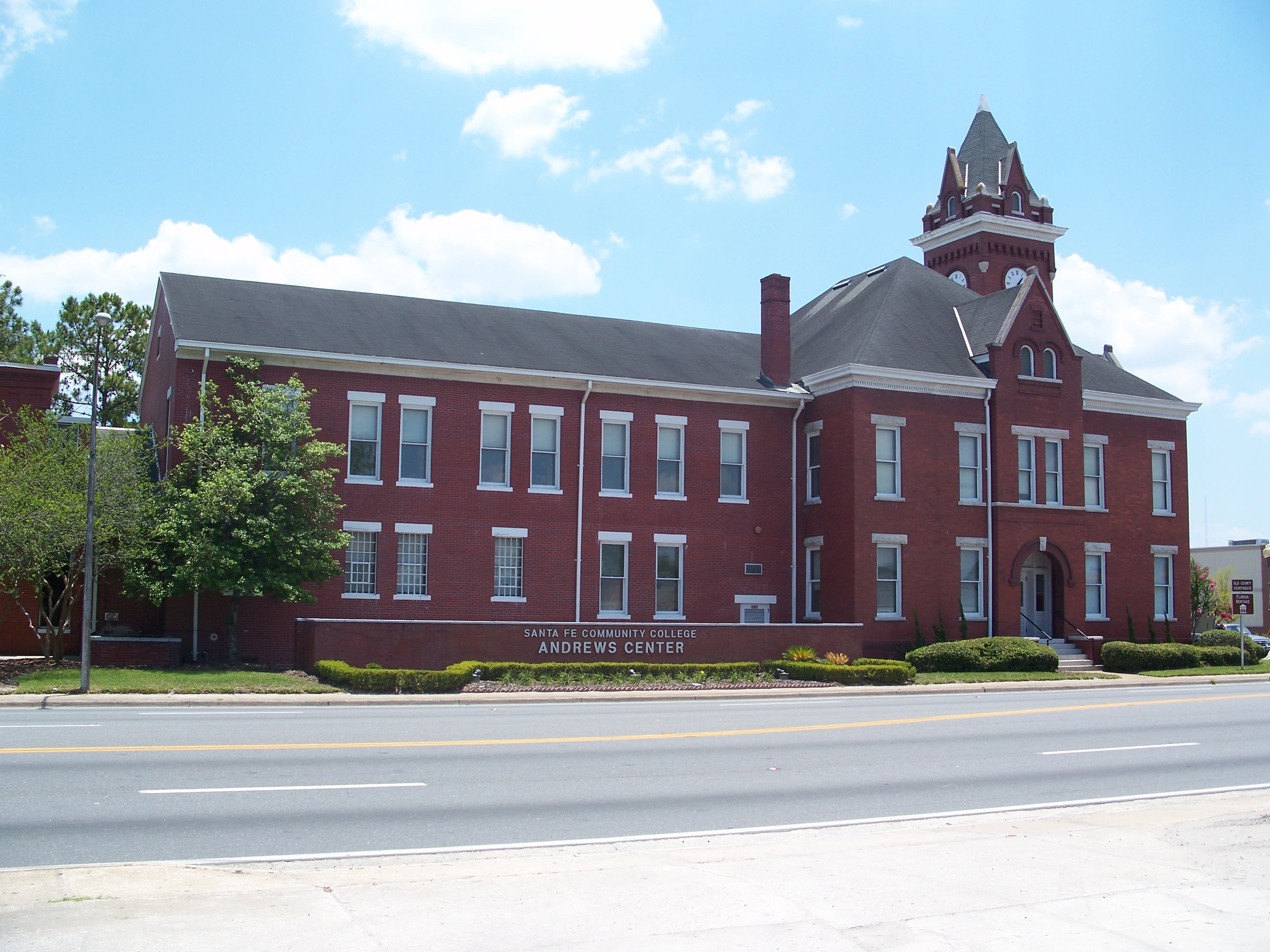
Old Bradford County Courthouse along US 301 in Starke

A Starke Bypass was proposed for construction by the FDOT for the year 2010, and has been completed late summer of 2019 The interchanges that already exist with US 441 near Sparr, SR 20 in Hawthorne, and SR 24 in Waldo could also be used if the state were to upgrade the road as a freeway.

The next town over is Lawtey, which contains intersections with the eastern terminus of County Road 225 and then crosses County Road 125.

=== Metropolitan Jacksonville to Georgia ===
US 301 cuts through the northwest corner of Clay County with only one moderate intersection; County Road 218. After this, the road enters Duval County and the city of Jacksonville. As the road enters Maxville, it shares a brief concurrency with SR 228. After passing through Fiftone the road encounters a large railroad yard on the east side before the partial-cloverleaf interchange with I-10, before entering Baldwin.

In September 2020, the Florida Department of Transportation opened the Baldwin Bypass around the western edge of town.

The existing US 301 turns right at an intersection on the southern end of the new bypass, and then crosses railroad tracks that serve the suspended Amtrak Sunset Limited before making a right turn at a concurrency with U.S. 90 for several blocks. Immediately after another railroad crossing, both US 90 and US 301 narrow down to two lanes at the east end of this concurrency. US 301 remains a two-lane rural highway until it reaches the northern end of the Baldwin Bypass, and then turns right to continue north. The segment of US 301 between Baldwin and Callahan was originally two lanes, and was widened to 4 lanes in 2014. US 301 then crosses into Nassau County, and passes through the small unincorporated towns of Bryceville, and Crawford. In Crawford, the highway crosses Norfolk Southern tracks via a bridge. US 301 then enters Callahan, where it crosses over a railroad bridge and gets the name West First Avenue. US 301 becomes East First Avenue at Booth Street before the intersection with US 1/23. Here, SR A1A/200 continue running along East First Avenue toward Fernandina Beach, while US 301 becomes part of a three route overlap with US 1-23 between Callahan, and Folkston, Georgia.

== History ==
A US 301 shield used in Florida prior to 1993

US 301 first entered Florida in 1949, terminating in Tampa. Initially, US 301 ran from Thonotosassa to Tampa along present-day Harney Road to US 92. It then ran east concurrently with US 92 with both routes terminating at Nebraska Avenue.

In 1952, US 301 was extended south from Tampa to Sarasota. US 301 was then rerouted to run from Harney Road east concurrently with US 92, then south along its current route to Palmetto, Bradenton, and Sarasota. The route from US 92 to Palmetto via Riverview, Wimauma, and Parrish was previously the route of US 41. When US 301 was extended, US 41 was then moved to its current route closer to the coast between Tampa and Palmetto (which was previously designated US 541).

US 301 then continued south from Palmetto to Bradenton concurrently with US 41 over the original Green Bridge over the Manatee River, then south to Sarasota along the present route of 9th Street, 301 Boulevard, 15th Street, and Washington Boulevard. In Sarasota, US 301 initially terminated at Main Street, which carried US 41 from Washington Boulevard to downtown Sarasota at the time. US 301 was extended a half mile south along Washington Boulevard in Sarasota in 1959 when US 41 was rerouted to its current route along the newly built Bayfront Drive along Sarasota Bay.

Also in 1952, US 301 (along with US 441) was realigned to bypass downtown Ocala on an expanded Pine Avenue, which included overpasses over the area's railroad lines. US 301 previously entered Ocala from the south along SW 1st Avenue, then north along SE 1st Avenue and Magnolia Avenue.

In 1954, the current route of US 301 between Thonotosassa and Tampa was built, replacing Harney Road. In 1957, both US 41 and US 301 were rerouted to the newly built Hernando Desoto Bridge over the Manatee River between Bradenton and Palmetto.

From 1956 until 1993, US 301 signs in Florida featured black numbering on a yellow shield. The "color-coding" of U.S. Routes by the Florida Department of Transportation was stopped when the state could no longer use federal funds to replace signs that were not in compliance with the Manual on Uniform Traffic Control Devices (MUTCD) per 23 CFR 655.603. Signs replaced after this time period used the MUTCD standard of black numerals on a white shield surrounded by a rectangular black background.

Around 1985, U.S. 301 was realigned in southern Manatee County between the Sarasota County line and U.S. 41 to its current alignment along a former Atlantic Coast Line Railroad corridor built by the Tampa Southern Railroad. U.S. 301 previously ran to the west along 15th Street and 301 Boulevard.

== Major intersections ==
County	Location	mi	km	Destinations	Notes
Sarasota	Sarasota	0.000	0.000	US 41 (Mound Street / Tamiami Trail / SR 45)	
Sarasota	Sarasota	0.722	1.162	SR 780 east (Fruitville Road) to I-75	
Sarasota–Manatee county line		4.184	6.733	To I-75 / University Parkway (CR 610) – Sarasota-Bradenton International Airport, New College of Florida, USF Sarasota-Manatee	
Manatee		8.244	13.267	SR 70 (53rd Avenue East / Oneco Road) to I-75 – Oneco, Arcadia	
Manatee		10.671	17.173	SR 70 (15th Street East)	
Manatee	Bradenton	12.092	19.460	US 41 south (1st Street / SR 55)	interchange; southbound exit and northbound entrance; north end of SR 683 overlap; south end of US 41 / SR 55 overlap
Manatee	Bradenton	12.596	20.271	SR 64 east (6th Avenue) to I-75 – Zolfo Springs	
Manatee	Bradenton	12.686	20.416	SR 64 west (Manatee Avenue) – Anna Maria Island, Beaches	
Manatee				Hernando Desoto Bridge over the Manatee River	
Manatee	Palmetto	14.48	23.30	US 41 north (SR 55 north) to US 19 north / 10th Street West (SR 43 south) – Manatee Fairgrounds, St. Petersburg	interchange; north end of US 41 / SR 55 overlap; south end of SR 43 overlap
Manatee	Ellenton	16.544	26.625	Ellenton-Gillette Road (CR 683 north)	
Manatee		18.02	29.00	I-75 (SR 93) – Naples, Tampa, St. Petersburg	I-75 exit 224
Manatee	Parrish	24.256	39.036	CR 675 east – Lake Manatee State Recreation Area, Arcadia	
Manatee	Parrish	25.048	40.311	SR 62 east – Wauchula	
Manatee		25.468	40.987	To I-75 / Moccasin Wallow Road (CR 683 west)	
Hillsborough		35.556	57.222	SR 674 (Sun City Center Boulevard) to I-75 – Sun City Center, Wimauma, Convention Center	
Hillsborough		39.520	63.601	CR 672 east – Balm	
Hillsborough		41.036	66.041	CR 672 west (Big Bend Road) to I-75	
Hillsborough	Riverview	45.558	73.318	To I-75 / Gibsonton Drive / Boyette Road	
Hillsborough		49.11	79.03	I-75 (SR 93A) to SR 618 west (Selmon Expressway) / SR 60 east – Ocala, Brandon, Tampa, Naples	I-75 exit 254
Hillsborough		50.510	81.288	SR 676 west (Causeway Boulevard / CR 676 east) – Tampa, Port of Tampa, Brandon Town Center	
Hillsborough		51.04	82.14	SR 618 (Selmon Expressway) to I-75 – Ocala, Naples, Tampa, St. Petersburg	SR 618 exit 13
Hillsborough		52.375	84.289	SR 60 (Adamo Drive) to I-75 / SR 618 (Selmon Expressway) – Brandon, Tampa	
Hillsborough		53.73	86.47	Overpass Road (to Broadway Avenue / CR 574)	interchange
Hillsborough	East Lake-Orient Park	54.681	88.001	SR 574 (Martin Luther King Jr. Boulevard) to I-4 west / I-75 – Mango, Tampa	
Hillsborough	East Lake-Orient Park	55.291	88.982	Elm Fair Boulevard – State Fairgrounds, Amphitheatre	north end of SR 43; south end of SR 41
Hillsborough	East Lake-Orient Park	55.68	89.61	US 92 (SR 600) / I-4 to I-75 – Orlando, Tampa, St. Petersburg	I-4 exit 7
Hillsborough		58.335	93.881	Harney Road	
Hillsborough	Thonotosassa	60.237	96.942	SR 582 west (Fowler Avenue) to I-75 – Temple Terrace, University of South Florida, Busch Gardens	
Hillsborough		62.395	100.415	CR 579 south (Mango Road) – Thonotosassa	
Pasco				SR 56 west – Wesley Chapel	Opened July 2019
Pasco		74.799	120.377	Chancey Road – Dade City	to CR 535, eastern bypass of Zephyrhills
Pasco		75.496	121.499	SR 39 south – Crystal Springs, Plant City	north end of SR 41; south end of SR 39 overlap
Pasco	Zephyrhills	76.668	123.385	SR 54 west (5th Avenue) to I-75 – Land o' Lakes	
Pasco	Zephyrhills	77.472	124.679	To SR 54 west / 6th Street	
Pasco	Zephyrhills	77.822	125.242	CR 41 north (Fort King Road)	
Pasco	Zephyrhills	78.086	125.667	CR 54 (Eiland Boulevard) to I-75 / US 98 south	
Pasco		83.074	133.695	US 98 south (SR 35 / SR 700) – Lakeland	north end of SR 39; south end of US 98 / SR 35 / SR 700 overlap
Pasco	Dade City	83.369	134.169	SR 52 west / CR 52 Alt. east (Clinton Avenue)	
Pasco	Dade City	85.208	137.129	7th Street (SR 35 north / SR 700 north) – Downtown	north end of SR 35 / SR 700 overlap; south end of SR 533. Roundabout
Pasco	Dade City	85.777	138.045	CR 35 Alt. south (Old Lakeland Highway) – Richland	Roundabout
Pasco	Dade City	86.059	138.499	CR 52 west (Meridian Avenue) to I-75 – Downtown	
Pasco	Dade City	86.810	139.707	7th Street (SR 35 south / SR 700 south) – Downtown	north end of SR 533; south end of SR 35 / SR 700 overlap
Pasco	Dade City	86.999	140.011	Lock Street – Spring Lake, Pasco-Hernando Community College	former CR 578 west
Pasco		92.506	148.874	US 98 north (SR 700) to I-75 – Brooksville, Perry	north end of US 98 / SR 700 overlap
Pasco	Trilacoochee	93.184	149.965	SR 575 north / CR 575 west (Trilby Road) – Trilby, Lacoochee	
Hernando	Ridge Manor	96.317	155.007	SR 50 (Cortez Boulevard) to I-75 / US 98 north – Brooksville, Groveland	
Sumter	St. Catherine	103.768	166.998	CR 673 to I-75	
Sumter		104.200	167.694	CR 478 east – Webster	
Sumter	Bushnell	107.211	172.539	CR 48 east / CR 476 west (Seminole Avenue) – Nobleton, Center Hill, Sumter County Fairgrounds	south end of CR 48 overlap
Sumter	Bushnell	107.744	173.397	CR 48 west / CR 475 north (North Main Street) to I-75 – Floral City	north end of CR 48 overlap
Sumter	Bushnell	108.091	173.956	CR 476 east	
Sumter	Sumterville	115.019	185.105	CR 470 west to I-75 – Lake Panasoffkee	south end of CR 470 overlap
Sumter		115.342	185.625	SR 471 south – Webster, Sumter County Fairgrounds	
Sumter		115.575	186.000	CR 470 east – Correctional Facility	north end of CR 470 overlap
Sumter	Wildwood	119.968	193.070	CR 468 east	
Sumter	Wildwood	122.57	197.26	Florida's Turnpike (SR 91) to I-75 north	Turnpike exit 304
Sumter	Wildwood	123.297	198.427	SR 44 to I-75 – Inverness, Leesburg	
Sumter	Wildwood	124.089	199.702	CR 44A (Martin Luther King Jr. Avenue)	
Sumter	Wildwood	124.627	200.568	CR 466A east	
Sumter	Wildwood	125.873	202.573	CR 462 east	south end of CR 462 overlap
Sumter		126.132	202.990	CR 462 west – Camp Wildwood	north end of CR 462 overlap
Sumter	Wildwood	127.634	205.407	CR 472 east – Lake Miona Park	
Sumter	Oxford	128.898	207.441	CR 466 – The Villages	
Marion	Dallas	132.681	213.529	CR 42 – Pedro, The Villages, Weirsdale	
Marion		135.981	218.840	Southeast 132nd Street Road	south bypass of Belleview
Marion	Belleview	138.030	222.138	US 27 south / US 441 south (SR 500)	south end of US 27 / US 441 / SR 500 overlap
Marion	see US 441 (mile 308.734-330.372)				
Marion		159.668	256.961	US 441 north (SR 25) – Gainesville	north end of US 441 / SR 25 overlap
Marion		161.798	260.389	CR 316 – Reddick	
Marion		164.395	264.568	CR 200A south (Northeast Jacksonville Road) – Sparr, Anthony	
Marion	Citra	165.615	266.532	CR 318 – Williston, Orange Springs, Horseshoe Lake Park	
Alachua	Island Grove	168.124	270.569	CR 325 – Cross Creek, Marjorie Kinnan Rawlings State Historic Site	
Alachua	Hawthorne	176.948	284.770	CR 200A north (Southeast 221st Street)	
Alachua	Hawthorne	177.888	286.283	CR 2082 west (Southeast 69th Avenue) – Downtown	
Alachua	Hawthorne	178.30	286.95	SR 20 – Gainesville, Palatka	interchange
Alachua		180.167	289.951	CR 219A north	
Alachua	Campville	183.295	294.985	CR 1474	
Alachua	Orange Heights	187.212	301.289	SR 26 – Gainesville, Melrose	interchange
Alachua	Shenks	190.404	306.426	CR 1469 south / CR 1471 north – Earleton	
Alachua	Waldo	192.798	310.278	To SR 24 / Cole Street	
Alachua	Waldo	193.0	310.6	SR 24 west – Gainesville	interchange; no northbound exit
Alachua		196.087	315.571	CR 225 south	
Bradford		197.284	317.498	CR 221 north	
Bradford	Hampton	198.263	319.073	CR 18 – Brooker	
Bradford		200.367	322.459	CR 221 south – Hampton	
Bradford		201.032	323.530	CR 227 south – Brooker	
Bradford		201.98	325.06	US 301 Alt. north (Starke Bypass / SR 223 north)	Southern terminus of US 301 Alt. and SR 223
Bradford	Starke	203.435	327.397	CR 100A south (Southeast 44th Avenue)	to Lincoln City
Bradford	Starke	204.136	328.525	CR 100A west (Edwards Road) – National Guard Armory	
Bradford	Starke	204.518	329.140	SR 100 (Madison Street) – Lake City, Keystone Heights	
Bradford	Starke	204.570	329.224	SR 230 east (Call Street)	
Bradford	Starke	205.048	329.993	SR 16 (Dr. M.L. King Jr. Boulevard) – State Prison, Camp Blanding, Green Cove Springs	
Bradford	Starke	208.359	335.321	US 301 Alt. south (Starke Bypass / SR 223 south)	Northern terminus of US 301 Alt. and SR 223
Bradford		208.366	335.333	CR 233	
Bradford		209.840	337.705	CR 200A north	
Bradford		210.351	338.527	CR 200B north – Lawtey Correctional Institution	
Bradford	Lawtey	211.776	340.820	CR 225 west (Madison Street) – State Prison	
Bradford	Lawtey	211.865	340.964	CR 225 east / CR 200A south (Lake Street) – Camp Blanding, Lawtey Correctional Institution	
Bradford	Lawtey	212.701	342.309	CR 125	
Clay		219.727	353.616	CR 218 east – Middleburg, Penney Farms	
Duval	Maxville	223.206	359.215	SR 228 east (Normandy Boulevard) – Jacksonville	south end of SR 228 overlap
Duval	Maxville	223.342	359.434	CR 228 west (Maxville Macclenny Highway) – Macclenny	north end of SR 228 overlap
Duval		229.63	369.55	I-10 (SR 8) – Jacksonville, Lake City	
Duval				US 301 Byp. north (Baldwin Bypass / SR 201)	Truck Route of US 301
Duval	Baldwin	230.571	371.068	US 90 west (SR 10)	south end of US 90 / SR 10 overlap
Duval	Baldwin	231.225	372.121	US 90 east (SR 10) – Jacksonville	north end of US 90 / SR 10 overlap
Duval				US 301 Byp. south (Baldwin Bypass / SR 201) – Jacksonville, Starke	Truck Route of US 301
Nassau		236.691	380.917	CR 119 south (Otis Road)	
Nassau	Bryceville	237.724	382.580	CR 119 north	
Nassau	Callahan	251.425	404.629	US 1 south / US 23 south (SR 15) – Jacksonville SR A1A south / SR 200 east to I-95 – Yulee, Fernandina Beach	north end of SR 200 overlap; south end of US 1 / US 23 / SR 15 overlap
Nassau	Callahan	251.642	404.979	Brandies Avenue (CR 108 west)	
Nassau		252.063	405.656	CR 115 north (Old Dixie Highway)	
Nassau	Hilliard	262.309	422.145	CR 108	
Nassau	Boulogne	269.103	433.079	CR 121 south	
Nassau	Boulogne	269.316	433.422	US 1 north / US 23 north / US 301 north / SR 4 north / SR 15 north – Folkston, Nahunta, Waycross	Georgia state line (St. Marys River bridge)
1.000 mi = 1.609 km; 1.000 km = 0.621 mi: Concurrency terminus; Incomplete access

U.S. Route 301
Previous state: Terminus	Florida	Next state: Georgia
