= Dade City station =

Railway station in Dade City, Florida, United States

Dade City, FL
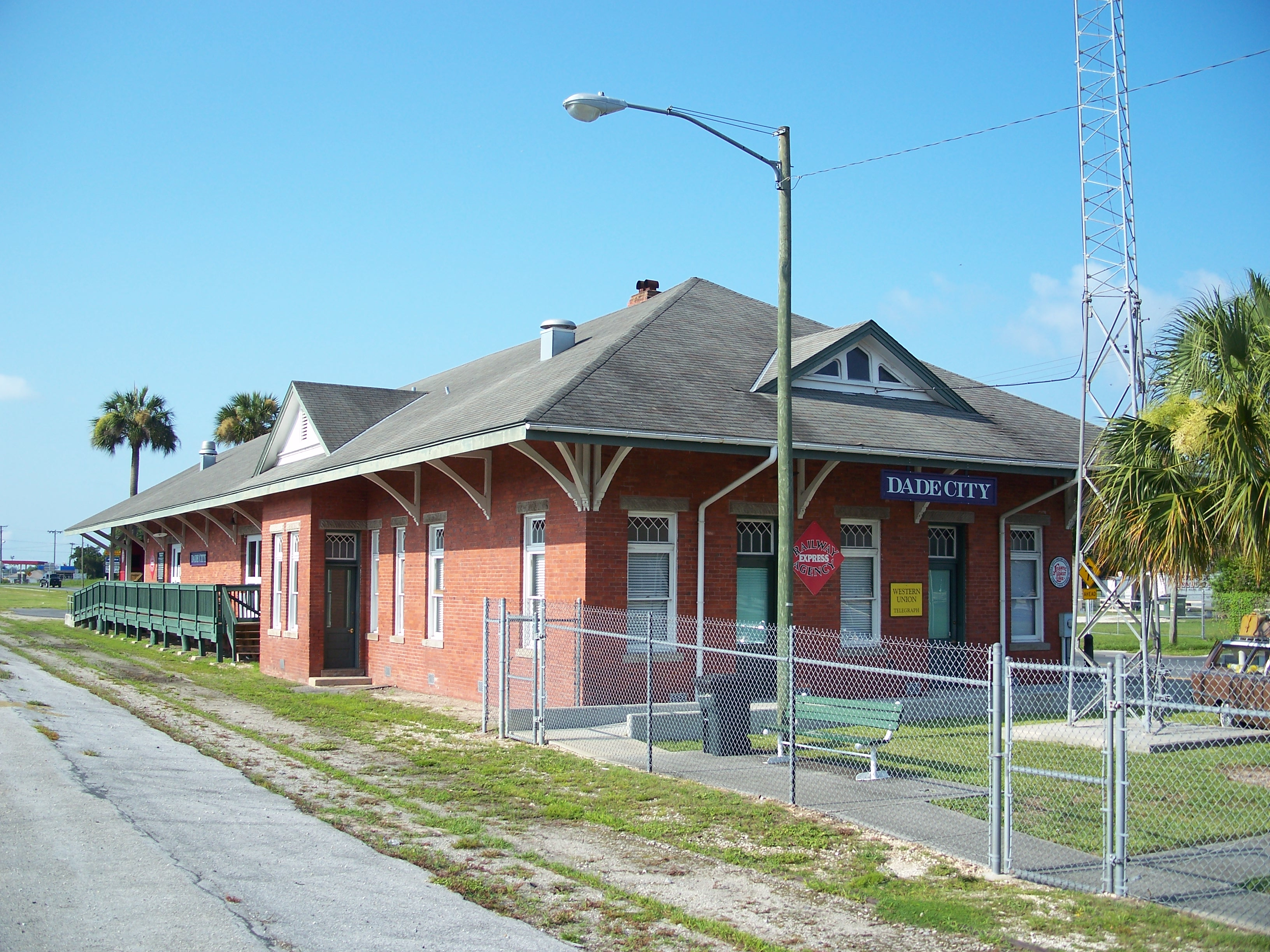
- Platform side view of Dade City station

General information
- Location: 14218 U.S. Highway 98; Dade City, Florida
- Owner: Amtrak
- Lines: Amtrak Thruway service to the Silver Meteor and Silver Star
- Platforms: 1 side platform
- Tracks: 3 (2 active)
- Connections: Pasco County Public Transportation

Other information
- Station code: DDE

History
- Opened: 1912
- Closed: 2004

Former services
Preceding station	Amtrak	Following station
Tampa toward Miami	Palmetto (2002–2004)	Wildwood toward New York
Preceding station	Atlantic Coast Line Railroad	Following station
Triliby toward High Springs	High Springs – Lakeland	Vitis toward Lakeland
- Dade City Atlantic Coast Line Railroad Depot
- U.S. National Register of Historic Places
- Location within Florida Location within the United States
- Location: Dade City, Florida
- Coordinates: 28°21′52″N 82°11′4″W
- Built: 1912
- Architectural style: Masonry Vernacular
- NRHP reference No.: 94000706
- Added to NRHP: July 15, 1994
Location

Dade City station is a railroad station and historic site located in Dade City, Florida, United States. The station is located on CSX's S-Line, which runs along the east side of the building. On July 15, 1994, it was added to the U.S. National Register of Historic Places.

== History ==
Built in 1912 by the Atlantic Coast Line Railroad (now CSX Transportation), it is located on the U.S. 98/301 Bypass, across the street from East Meridian Avenue (SR 52). Until 1957 it served as a station on their High Springs—Lakeland Line from Trilby to Tampa, serving the ACL's Southland en route to Tampa.

In 1971, most passenger service in the United States was transferred to Amtrak, but Dade City still remained without passenger service. Throughout the latter part of the 20th century, Amtrak would move trains off and onto the S-Line. Some of these trains include the Silver Meteor, Silver Star, Floridian, and Palmetto. However, Dade City still remained without service. Finally, in 1990, Amtrak brought passenger service back to Dade City by rerouting the Silver Star over the S-Line through Ocala and Wildwood, FL to Miami. Amtrak later rerouted the Silver Star again to the CSX A-Line through Orlando in 1996, and instead revived the Silver Palm along the S-Line, where it would keep its name, sleepers, and diner until 2002. In 2002, the train would be renamed back to Palmetto. Two years later, the Palmetto was truncated to Savannah, Georgia on November 1, 2004, prompting Amtrak to revive Silver Star service to Tampa along the CSX A-Line shared by the current Silver Meteor, and part of the suspended Sunset Limited, and ending passenger service to Dade City once again. Today, the station operates as a museum, and Amtrak Thruway bus service between Jacksonville and Lakeland still uses the station building.

== Preservation ==
The station was preserved and reopened as a tourist destination with a grand re-opening held on October 23, 2008. Through efforts from the city and local residents, the depot was transformed into the Dade City Heritage and Cultural Museum in 2018, where it now houses artifacts, photographs, documents, and records of historic places and longtime residents of Dade City. The museum consists of a main exhibition space, a model train room, and a Community Archive and Reading Room, where residents can conduct research on Dade City's people and history. The museum is a registered 501(c)3 non-profit and maintains close ties to the city of Dade City.

== Gallery ==
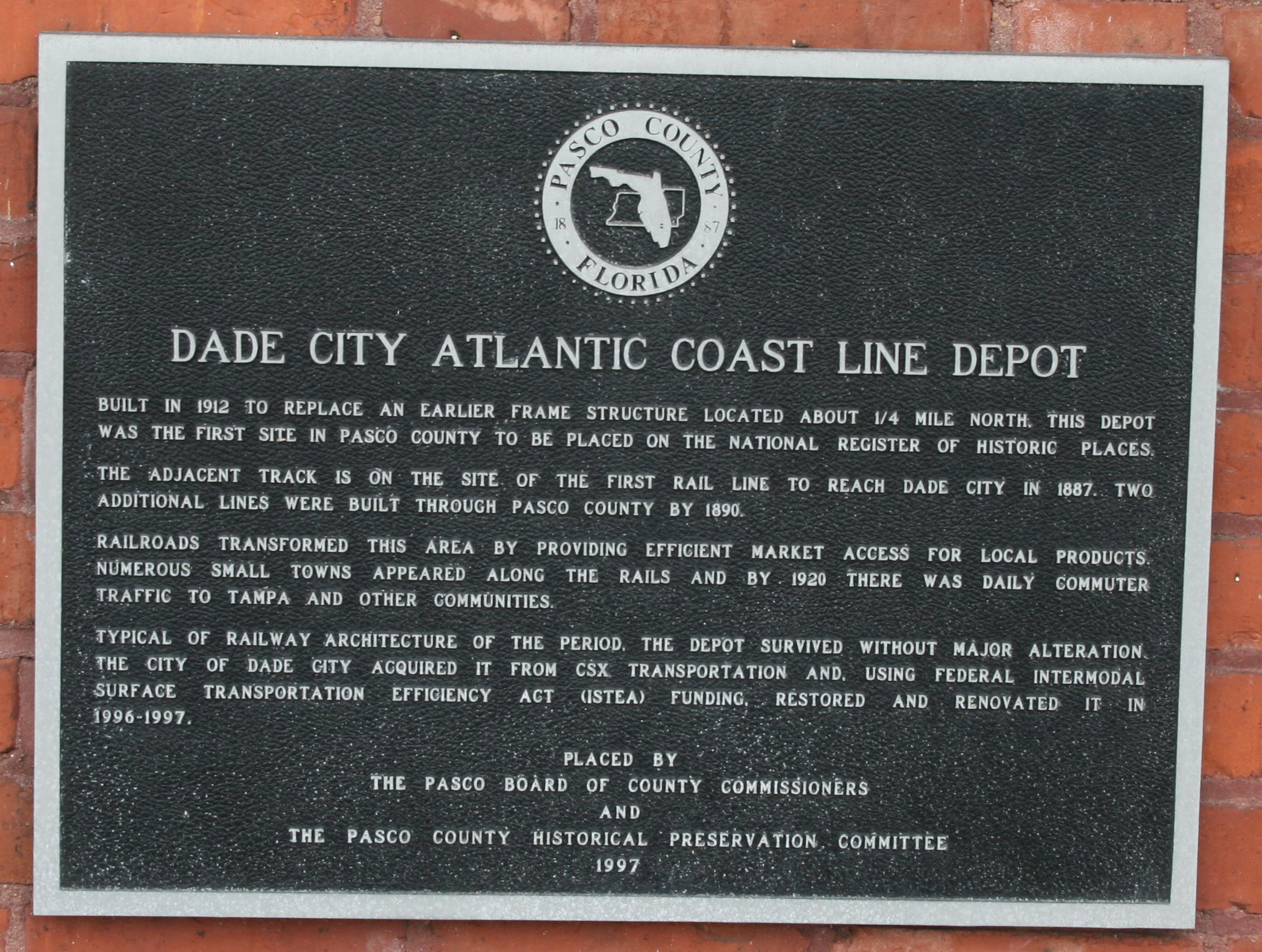
Historical marker on the station exterior.

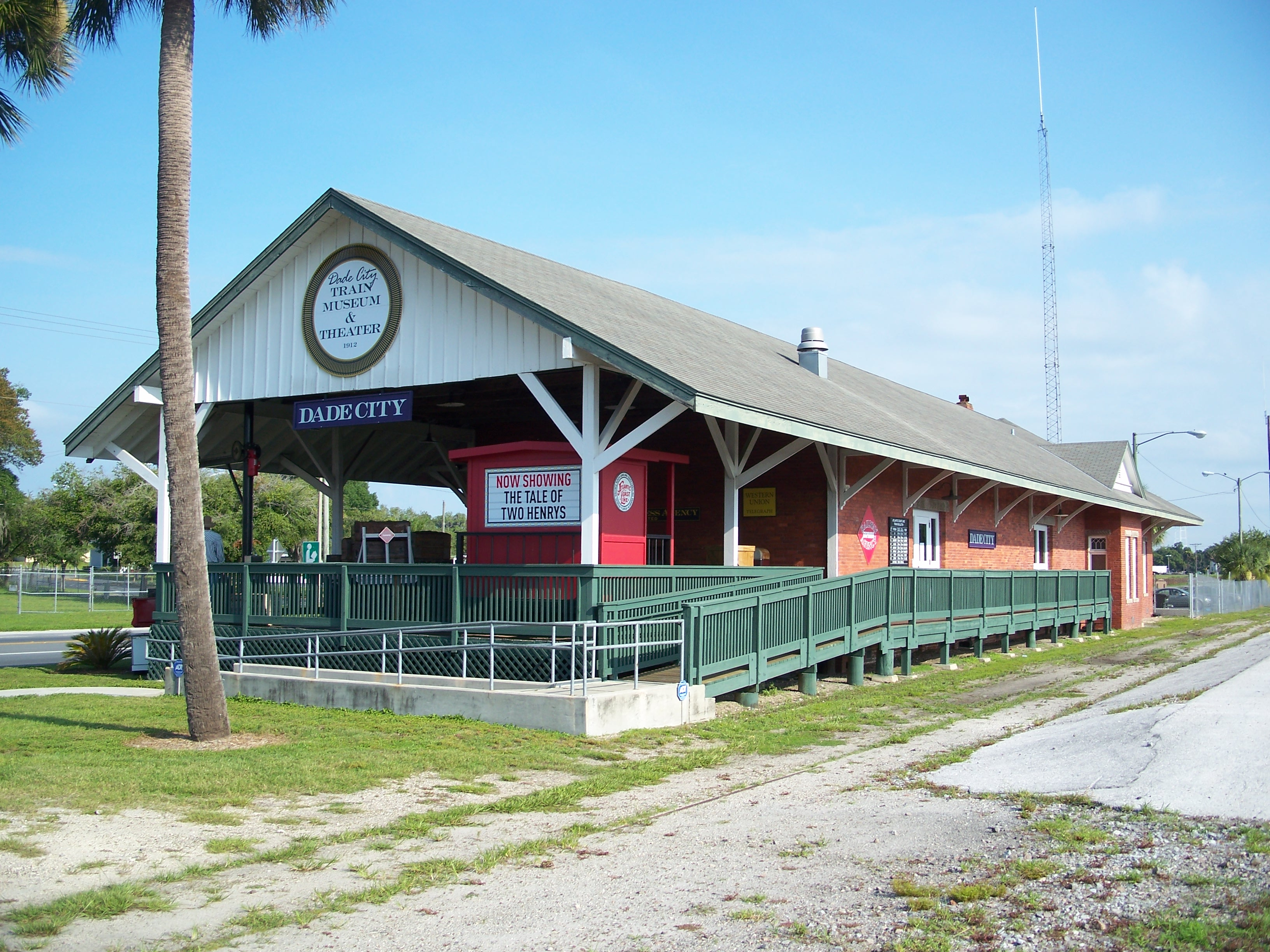
View of the station from the southeast side.
