= List of county roads in Nassau County, Florida =

- County road shields used in Florida

Highway names
- Interstates: Interstate X (I-X)
- US Highways: U.S. Highway X (US X)
- State: State Road X (SR X)
- County: County Road X (CR-X)

System links
- County roads in Florida; County roads in Nassau County

The following is a list of county roads in Nassau County, Florida. All county roads are maintained by the county in which they reside.

== County routes in Nassau County ==
Route	Road Names	From	To	Notes
CR 2		SR 94 at the Charlton County, GA line east of Saint George, GA	CR 121 west of Kent	former SR 2
CR 15A	Mickler Street	US 1 / US 23 / SR 15 in Callahan	CR 108 in Callahan	former SR 15A
CR 105A	Buccaneer Trail, Amelia Island Parkway, Amelia Road, South 14th Street Tarpon Avenue, Dolphin Avenue, Ocean Avenue, East 9th Street, North Fletcher Avenue	SR A1A in Amelia City CR 108 (Sadler Road) SR A1A / SR 200 (Atlantic Avenue)	SR A1A / SR 200 in Fernandina Beach SR A1A / SR 200 (Atlantic Avenue) / North 14th Street Kimberly Street	former SR 105A
CR 105B	Simmons Road	CR 105A (South 14th Street)	SR A1A (South Fletcher Avenue)	
CR 107	Old Nassauville Road, Blackrock Road, Chester Road	Old Nassauville Road and Santa Juana Road SR A1A / SR 200 and Mt. Zion Loop	SR A1A / SR 200 and O'Neil–Scott Road Chester Road	former SR 107
CR 107A	Arbor Lane			
CR 108	Brandies Avenue, St. George Road, River Road, Drury Ferry Road, Indiana Road, Second Street Sadler Road	CR 121 SR A1A / SR 200 (South 8th Street)	US 17 SR A1A (Fletcher Avenue)	former SR 108
CR 115	Old Dixie Highway, Bay Road	US 1 / US 23 / US 301 CR 121	Old Dixie Highway and Dyal Road CR 108	former SR 115
CR 115A	Kings Ferry Road	CR 108	Middle Road	former SR 115A
CR 119	Otis Road	CR 121 US 301 and Motes Road	US 301 CR 121 at the Duval County line south of Bryceville	former SR 119; Brief gap at US 301
CR 121	Brandy Branch Road, Baldwin-St. George Road	CR 121 at the Duval County line west of Baldwin CR 115 west of Hilliard	CR 108 west of Callahan US 1 / US 23 / US 301 / SR 15 south of Folkston, GA	former SR 121
CR 121A	Middle Road	CR 108 and Middle Road	Middle Road and Ephesus Road	former SR 121A
CR 200A	Pages Dairy Road, Chester Road	SR A1A / SR 200	SR A1A / SR 200	former SR 200A
