= Green Bridge (Manatee River) =

Bridge in Florida, United States

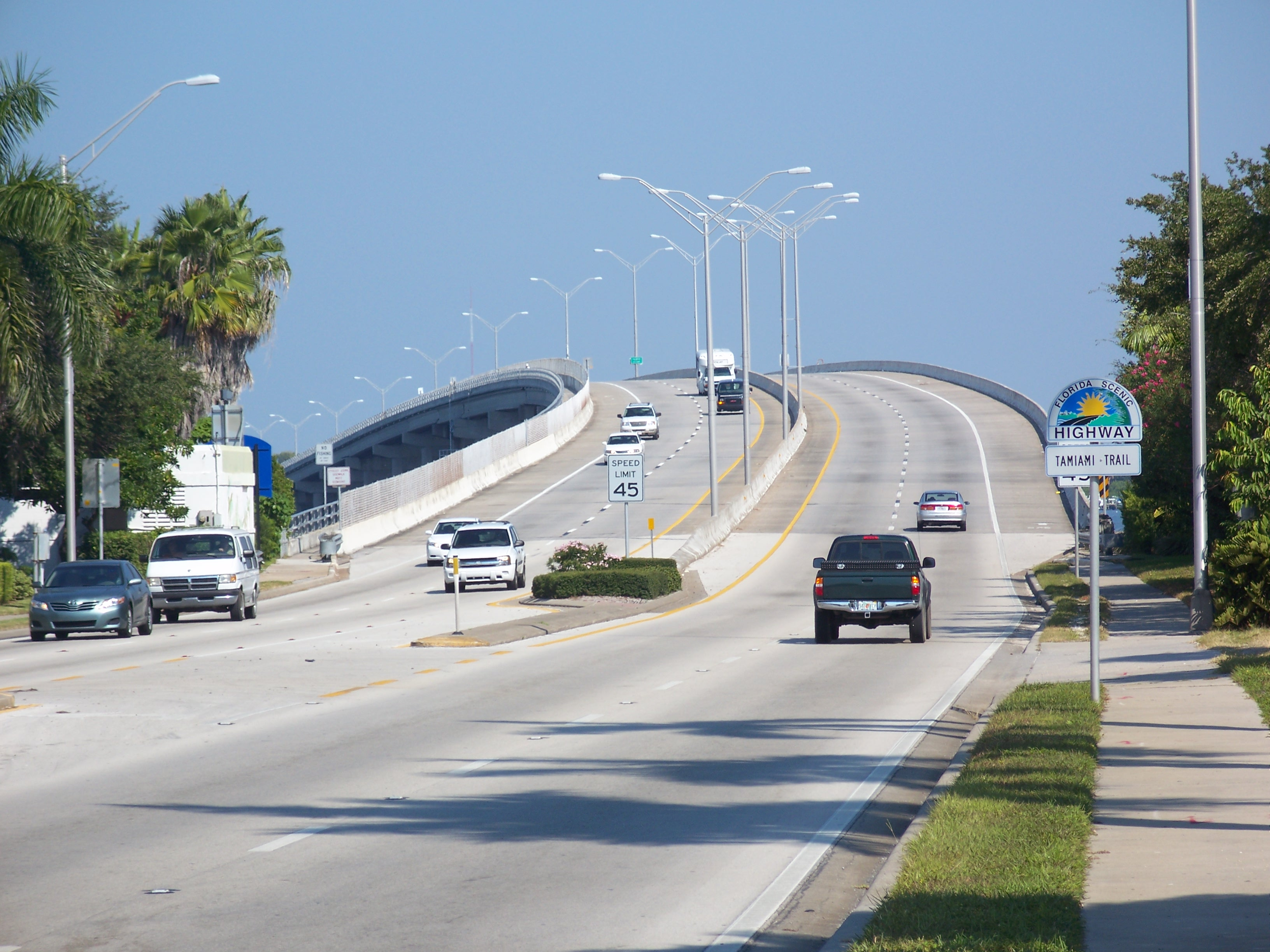
- Coordinates: 27°30′20.29″N 82°34′18.82″W
- Carries: US 41 Bus.
- Crosses: Manatee River
- Locale: Bradenton, Florida; Palmetto, Florida
- Official name: Green Bridge
- Maintained by: Florida Department of Transportation

Characteristics
- Design: Concrete girder bridge
- Clearance above: 40 feet (12 m)

History
- Opened: Original Bridge: 1927; Current Bridge: 1986

Statistics
- Toll: None

Location
- Interactive map of Green Bridge

The Green Bridge is a bridge carrying U.S. Highway 41 Business (US 41 Bus.) over the Manatee River between Palmetto and Bradenton, Florida. Built in 1986, the current Green Bridge is 40 feet (12 m) tall and carries four lanes. The original Green Bridge, which partially still stands as a fishing pier, was built in 1927 and named for Emmet P. Green, a local resident who served on the state road board.

== History ==
The first vehicle bridge built across the Manatee River between Bradenton and Palmetto opened in 1910 and it was named the Davis Bridge. The Davis Bridge was a wooden toll bridge built by C.H. Davis that had one lane and passing spots. The Davis Bridge went from present-day 9th Street East (located within then nearby Manatee) to near where the Atwood Grapefruit Groves were located at west of Ellenton. It was just to the east of the Seaboard Air Line Railroad's former bridge.

A second bridge, known as the Victory Bridge was opened in August 1919 running from current 9th Street West in Bradenton to 8th Avenue in Palmetto (the site of the current Green Bridge). Funding for the bridge came from bond issues by both Bradenton and Palmetto. The Victory Bridge was also a wooden structure and had two lanes. It was named for the United States' recent victory in World War I against the Central Powers. With the Victory Bridge's construction, the municipal government of Manatee attempted to buy Davis Bridge and make it public but the deal however never went through. The rest of the Davis Bridge ended up being dismantled with the exception of its swing span which was sold to county government and reused for the first bridge to Snead Island in 1920.

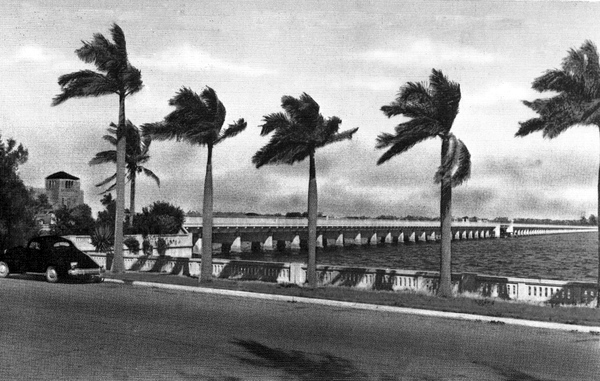
Original Green Bridge over Manatee River

The Victory Bridge was heavily damaged by a hurricane in 1926 and was subsequently deemed unsafe. The following year, the original Green Bridge was built to replace the Victory Bridge. During construction, a ferry operated until the Green Bridge was complete in 1927. The original Green Bridge was a concrete structure with a drawbridge to accommodate vessel traffic.

The Green Bridge would carry the Tamiami Trail (U.S. Route 41), which was completed through Florida in the late 1920s. In the early 1950s, U.S. Route 301 was extended south from Tampa to Sarasota. US 301 would cross the original Green Bridge concurrently with US 41 over the Manatee River.

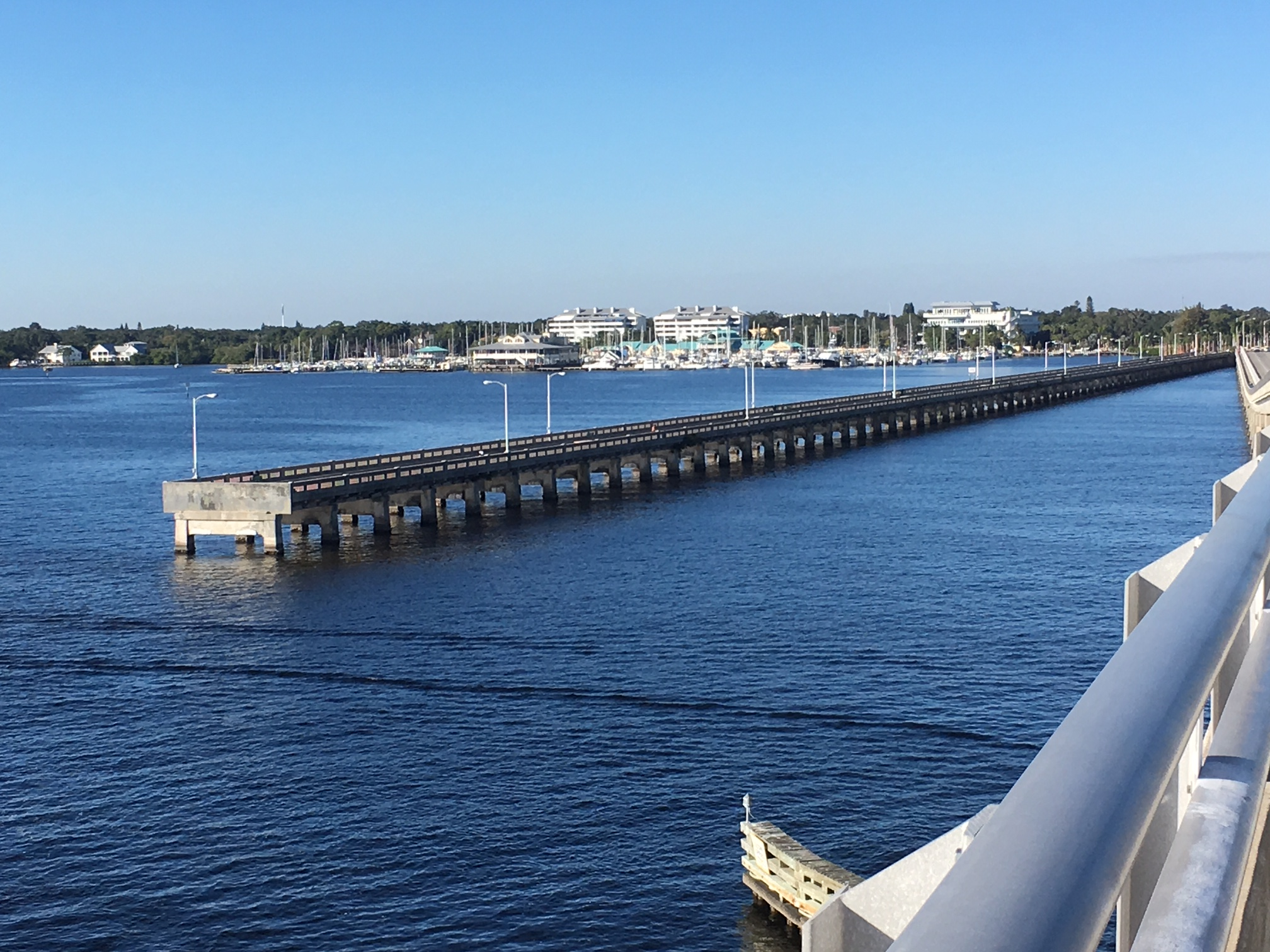
Original Green Bridge in use as a fishing pier

By the mid-1950s, the original Green Bridge was increasingly unable to handle increasing amounts of traffic over the Manatee River. As a result, the Florida Department of Transportation built the Hernando Desoto Bridge a half mile to the east in 1957. After its completion, both US 41 and US 301 were rerouted on to the Desoto Bridge, which was four lanes and was a higher fixed-span bridge. The original Green Bridge remained in service with its route becoming the US 41 Business route.

The original Green Bridge was replaced by the current Green Bridge in 1986. The current bridge is four lanes and is a 40-foot-tall fixed span bridge. It was built on the site of the previous Victory Bridge. Part of the original Green Bridge on the north side of the river has been converted into a fishing pier.
