= Ocala Union Station =

Historic passenger train station in Ocala, Florida

Ocala, FL
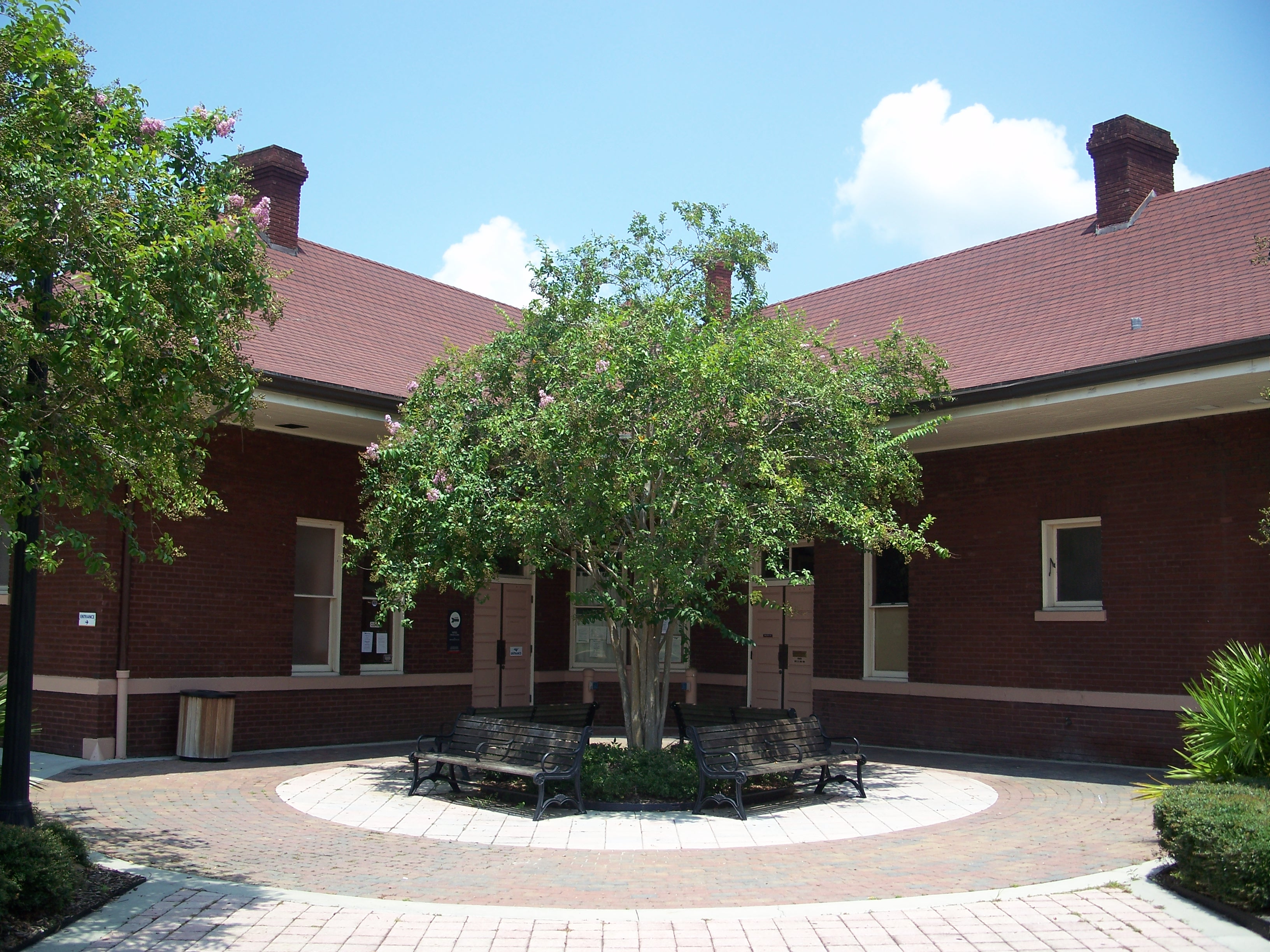
- A frontal view of the Ocala Union Station.

General information
- Location: 531 Northeast First Avenue, Ocala, Florida 34770
- Lines: Amtrak Thruway service to the Silver Meteor and Silver Star

Other information
- Station code: OCA

History
- Opened: 1917
- Closed: 2004

Former services
Preceding station	Amtrak	Following station
Wildwood toward Miami	Floridian	Waldo toward Chicago
Wildwood toward Miami	Palmetto	Waldo toward New York
Preceding station	Atlantic Coast Line Railroad	Following station
Trilby toward St. Petersburg	Ocala District	Gainesville toward Jacksonville
Preceding station	Seaboard Air Line Railroad	Following station
Wildwood toward Tampa or Miami	Main Line	Waldo toward Richmond
- Ocala Union Station
- U.S. National Register of Historic Places
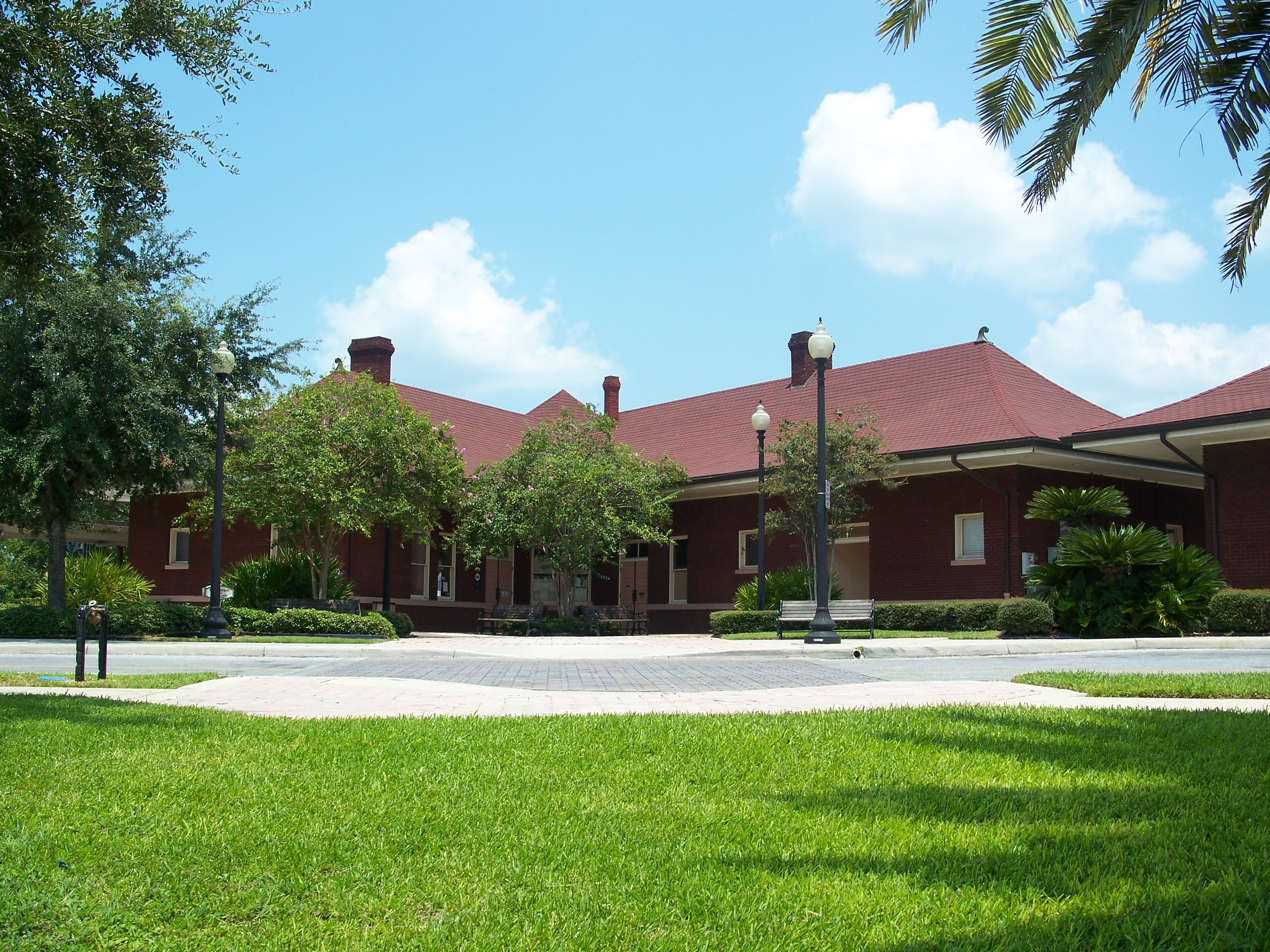

- Location within Florida Location within the United States
- Location: Ocala, Florida
- Coordinates: 29°11′31″N 82°8′9″W
- Architect: A. M. Williamson Walkup
- NRHP reference No.: 97001557
- Added to NRHP: December 22, 1997
Location

The Ocala Union Station (also known as Union Station Plaza) is a bus station and former train station in Ocala, Florida, United States. It is located at 531 Northeast First Avenue, and was built in 1917 by both the Atlantic Coast Line and Seaboard Air Line Railroad. Prior to this, ACL and SAL had separate depots in Ocala. The former ACL station was originally built by the Florida Southern Railroad, while the former SAL station was built by the Florida Transit and Peninsular Railroad. On December 22, 1997, it was added to the U.S. National Register of Historic Places.

== History ==
Ocala Union Station saw many passenger trains through the years, mainly from the Seaboard Air Line. This was due to the fact that the station was located on their mainline, also known as the "S-Line", while ACL's line was a secondary route. Seaboard's trains included the New York-originating Silver Meteor, Silver Star, Sunland, and Palmland. The station's ACL New York-originating trains included the West Coast Champion and Havana Special. Those trains made connections at Jacksonville's Union Station primarily for trains to Mid-Western cities, including the City of Miami, South Wind, Dixie Flagler, Dixie Flyer, Dixie Limited, Flamingo, and Seminole.

In 1971, most passenger service in the United States was transferred to Amtrak, and the Silver Meteor retained its stop in Ocala, running along the former Seaboard, then Seaboard Coast Line tracks. However, the West Coast Champion was discontinued, and passenger service ended for good on the ACL tracks. Throughout the latter part of the 20th century, Amtrak would move trains off and onto the S-Line. Some of these trains include the Silver Meteor, Silver Star, Floridian, and Palmetto. In 1997, the city of Ocala spent 4 millions dollars to renovate the station to its former glory.

Finally, Amtrak revived the Silver Palm along the now CSX-owned S-Line in 1996, where it would keep its name, sleepers, and diner until 2002. In 2002, the train would be renamed back to Palmetto. Two years later, the Palmetto was truncated to Savannah, Georgia on November 1, 2004, prompting Amtrak to revive Silver Star service to Tampa along the CSX A-Line shared by the current Silver Meteor, and part of the suspended Sunset Limited, and finally ending passenger service to Ocala.

Today, the station operates as a bus terminal for Ocala's SunTran, and Amtrak Thruway bus service between Jacksonville and Lakeland. The platform north of the diamond was abandoned after a derailment took out the canopies in 2009. In 2013, fences were installed all around the station platform to prevent people from walking onto the still very active tracks of the Wildwood Subdivision (excluding the abandoned section).

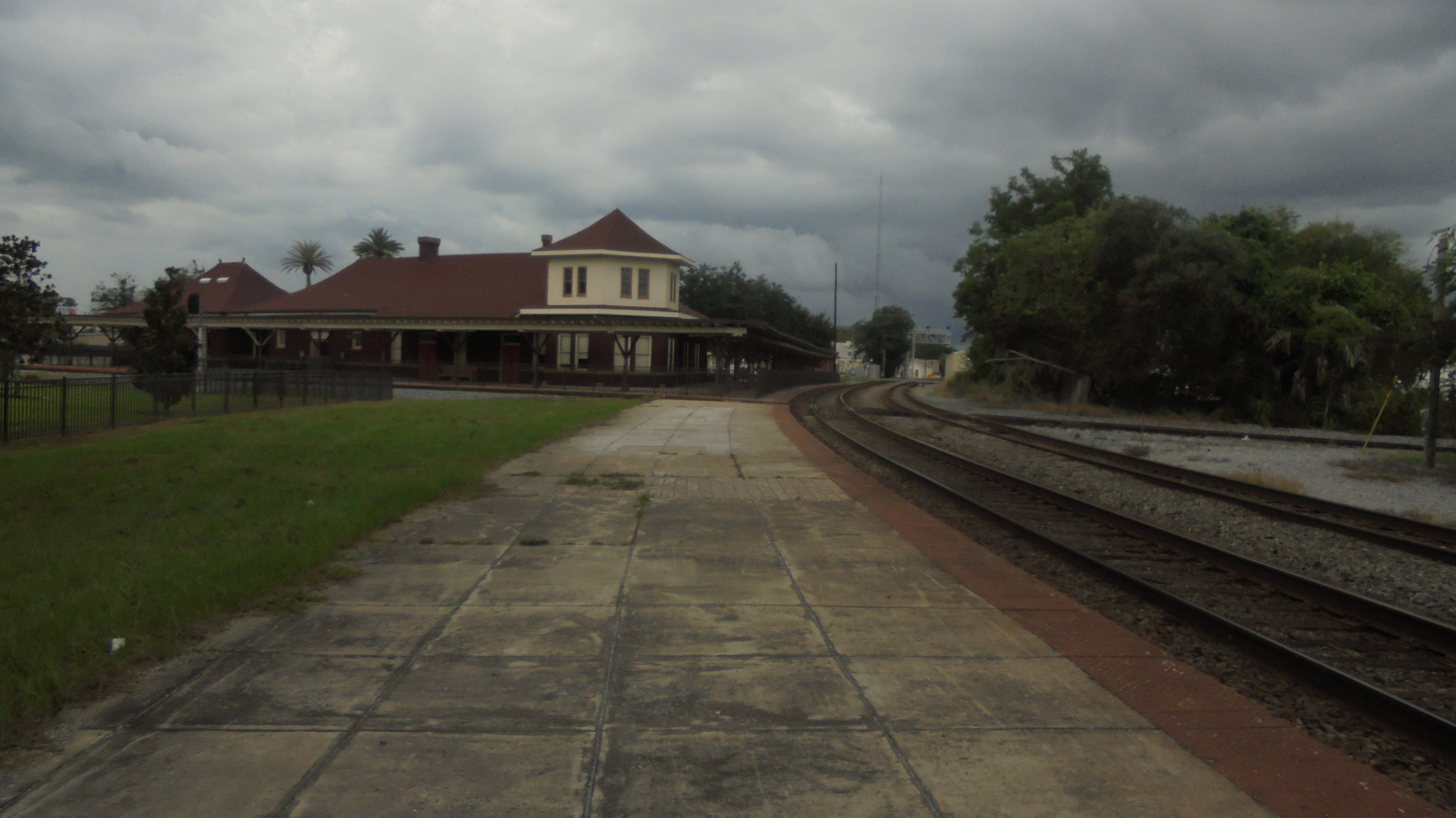
A southbound photo showing the station and the abandoned platform.

CSX leased the former ACL line to the Pinsly Railroad Company in 1988 who established the Florida Northern Railroad. The ACL line on which the FNOR operates used to run from Jacksonville to Trilby, but now only runs between Lowell and Candler. This line has seen sporadic freight service since it was severed at its current terminuses in the 1980s.

Ocala's SunTran bus service began using the station in 1998, and still uses it to this day. The Shuttleliner limo/van service offers several trips daily to Orlando International Airport from the station. In 2013, Greyhound moved out of the station to the Pilot Travel Center at 4032 West Highway 326, two blocks east of Interstate 75.
