= Kent, Florida =

Unincorporated community in Florida, U.S.

- Unincorporated community
- Interactive map of Kent, Florida
- Country: United States
- State: Florida
- County: Nassau County

Kent is an unincorporated community in Nassau County, Florida, United States. It is located on Former State Road 2 near Nassau CR 121, in the southwestern part of the county.

== Geography ==
Kent is located at 30°31′17″N 81°58′00″W (30.5214, -81.9667).
