= Bryceville, Florida =

- Town
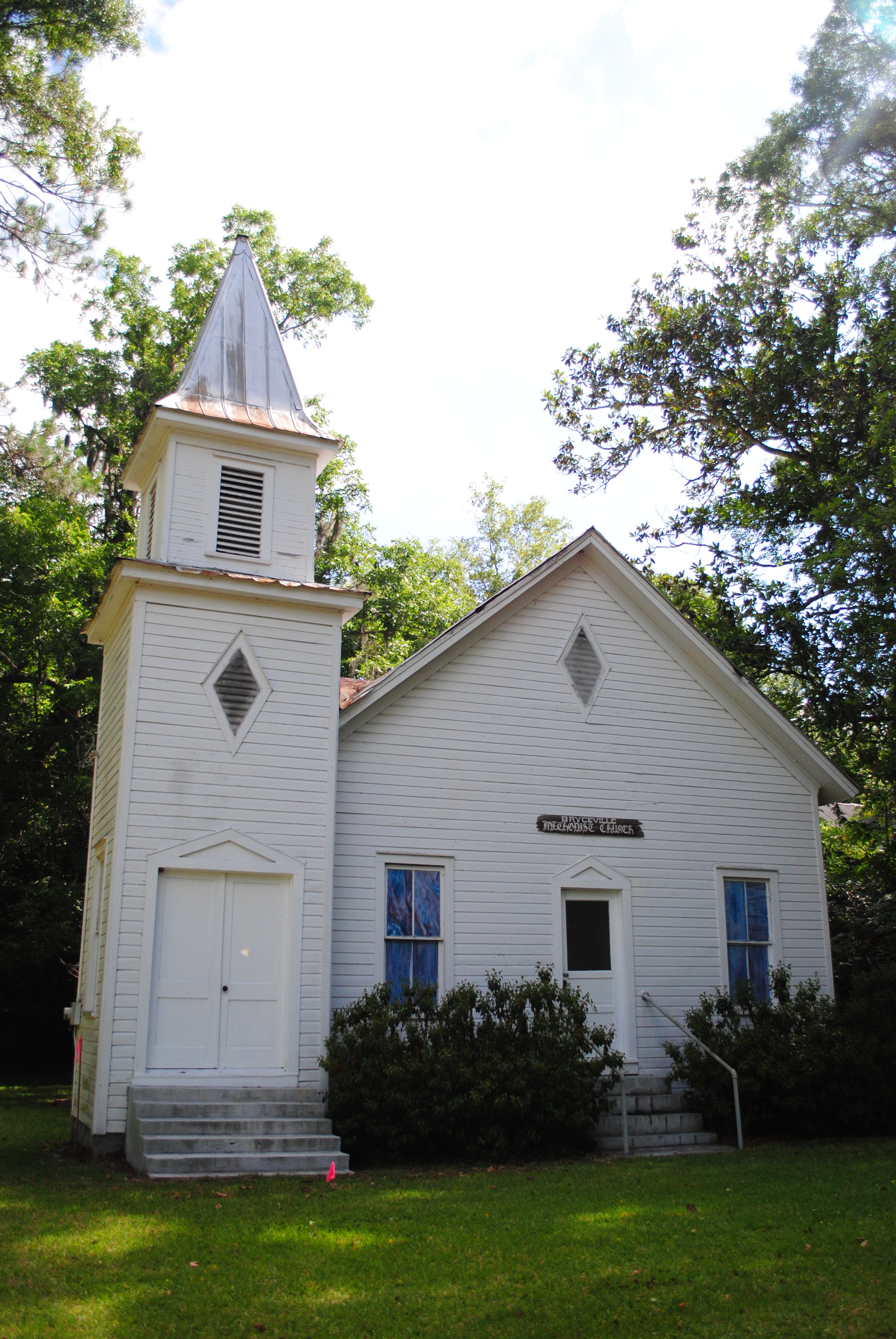
- Bryceville Methodist Church

- Location in Nassau County and the state of Florida
- Coordinates: 30.383997°N 81.938934°W
- Country: United States
- State: Florida
- County: Nassau
- Time zone: UTC-5 (Eastern (EST))
  - Summer (DST): UTC-4 (EDT)
- ZIP code: 32009
- Area code(s): 904, 324
- FIPS code: 12-09700
- GNIS feature ID: 0279841

Bryceville is an unincorporated community in Nassau County, Florida, United States. It is located on US 301, in the southwestern part of the county.

== Arts and culture ==
Nassau County Public Library operates the Bryceville Library.

== Education ==
Nassau County School District operates public schools. Bryceville Elementary School serves grades K-5. It has grade A schools

== Infrastructure ==
Bryceville lies on US 301. CR 119 intersects to the north and travels west, and Otis Road intersects to the south and travels east.

Nassau County Fire Rescue operates Station 60 in Bryceville.
