= Wildwood station =

Bus station in Wildwood, Florida

Wildwood, FL
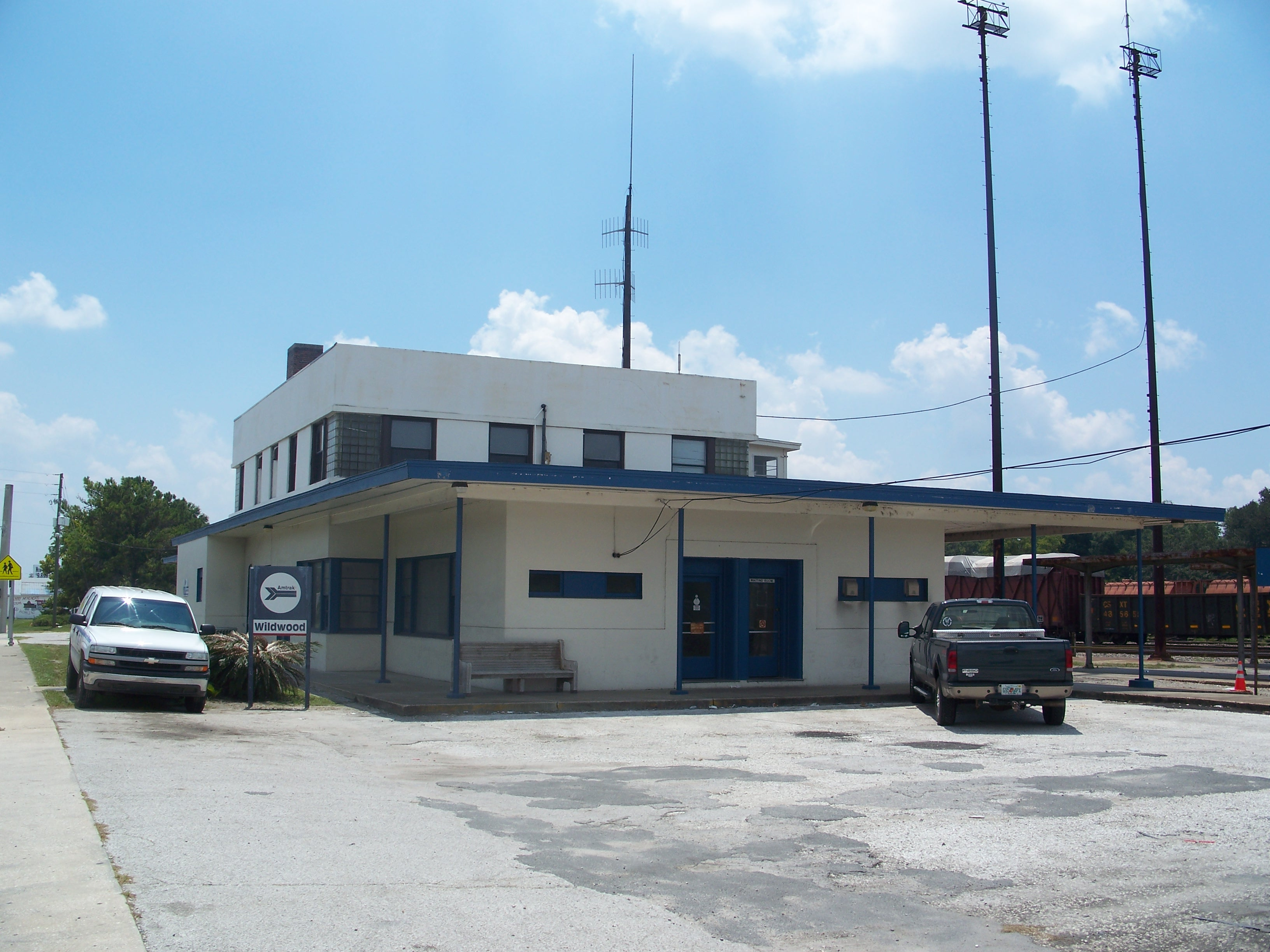

General information
- Location: 601 North Main Street (US 301); Wildwood, Florida 34785
- Coordinates: 28.86553°N 82.03963°W
- Owner: CSX
- Lines: Amtrak Thruway service to the Silver Meteor and Silver Star

History
- Opened: 1947
- Closed: 2004

Former services
Preceding station	Amtrak	Following station
Winter Haven toward Miami	Floridian	Ocala toward Chicago
Dade City toward Miami	Palmetto (2002–2004)	Ocala toward New York
Preceding station	Seaboard Air Line Railroad	Following station
Coleman toward Tampa or Miami	Main Line	Ocala toward Richmond
Terminus	Orlando Subdivision	Leesburg toward Lake Charm
Location

Wildwood station is a bus station, and former train station, in Wildwood, Florida. It serves Amtrak Thruway buses and formerly served trains for Amtrak and other rail companies. The station is located on 601 North Main Street (US 301) in Wildwood, Florida. Along with the northern terminus of Florida's Turnpike, the station gave Wildwood a reason to refer to itself as "The Crossroads of Florida."

== History ==
The station was built in 1947 by the Seaboard Air Line Railroad (SAL) in the art deco architectural style, and is located on what is today CSX's S-Line, which runs along the west side of the building. This segment of the S-Line is officially named the Wildwood Subdivision. The station served SAL's Orange Blossom Special, Silver Meteor, Silver Star, Sunland and Palmland. It was a few miles south of this location at Coleman that the SAL mainlines split: the main sections, or "east coast" sections of the Silver Meteor, Silver Star, Sunland, and Palmland travelled along SAL's mainline to their station in Miami, while the secondary sections, or "west coast" sections of the Silver Meteor, Silver Star, Sunland, and Palmland travelled along SAL's mainline to their station in Tampa. These "west coast" trains also continued in different sections to St. Petersburg with a stop in Clearwater, and Venice with stops in Bradenton and Sarasota.

In 1967, after the merger of Atlantic Coast Line Railroad (ACL) and the SAL into the new Seaboard Coast Line Railroad, the Florida Special, Silver Meteor, Silver Star, and Palmland made stops at the station from 1967 to 1971, while the Sunland was discontinued by SCL in 1968. On May 1, 1971, Amtrak assumed SCL passenger operations, but opted to not continue the Palmland.

In 1971, most passenger service in the United States was transferred to Amtrak, and the Silver Meteor retained its stop in Wildwood. Throughout the latter part of the 20th century, Amtrak would move trains off and onto the S-Line. Some of these trains include the Silver Meteor, Silver Star, Floridian, and Palmetto. Finally, Amtrak revived the Silver Palm along the CSX S-Line in 1996, where it would keep its name, sleepers, and diner until 2002. In 2002, the train would be renamed back to Palmetto. Two years later, the Palmetto was truncated to Savannah, Georgia on November 1, 2004, prompting Amtrak to revive Silver Star service to Tampa along the CSX A-Line shared by the current Silver Meteor, and part of the suspended Sunset Limited, and finally ending passenger service to Wildwood. Today, the station operates as a CSX crew and yard office, and Amtrak's Amtrak Thruway bus service between Jacksonville and Lakeland still uses the station building. The long-abandoned platforms and canopies were demolished in 2013 to make way for a second mainline, which was built over the land they once occupied.

Wildwood is also the western terminus of an abandoned SAL branchline that once ran to Orlando through the cities of Leesburg and Tavares. This branchline is now owned by the Florida Midland Railroad, and is in operation between Orlando and Tavares. The tracks past the wye that allowed access to the branchline from Wildwood used to run as far east as Orange Home along County Road 44A, and served as home for some abandoned freight cars until the first decade of the 21st century. However, CSX later pulled up the track in the early 2010's, and now currently uses the approximately 400 feet of track running past the stem of the wye to turn around locomotives.
