= County Road 610 (Florida) =

Road in Florida, United States

County Road 610
- University Parkway
- CR 610 highlighted in red

Route information
- Maintained by Sarasota County Public Works and Manatee County Public Works
- Length: 7.2 mi (11.6 km)

Major junctions
- West end: US 41 in Sarasota
- US 301 near Sarasota
- East end: I-75 near Lakewood Ranch

Location
- Country: United States
- State: Florida
- Counties: Sarasota, Manatee

Highway system
- County roads in Florida

County Road 610 (CR 610), locally known as University Parkway, is a seven-mile-long (11 km) county route in Sarasota, Sarasota County and Manatee County, Florida. It is a major commuter route from U.S. Highway 41 (US 41) to Interstate 75 (I-75) and it is the primary access road for Sarasota–Bradenton International Airport.

University Parkway from US 301 west to US 41 is fully within and maintained by Sarasota County. East of US 301, the route runs along the Sarasota-Manatee county line. While the route along this segment is predominately in Manatee County, Sarasota and Manatee counties have an interlocal agreement with the road in regards to maintenance due to its proximity to the county line. Manatee County is responsible for the maintenance of the physical roadway on this segment, while Sarasota County is responsible for maintaining traffic signals and landscaping along the corridor.

== Route description ==
University Parkway begins at an intersection with US 41 (Tamiami Trail) on the north side of Sarasota directly across from the John and Mable Ringling Museum of Art. From US 41, University Parkway is a four-lane road and it passes to the south of Sarasota–Bradenton International Airport. Shortly after passing the main entrance to the airport, it turns northeast and crosses the Seminole Gulf Railway before turning back east. It then expands to six lanes and comes to an intersection with US 301.

East of US 301, University Parkway runs east along the Sarasota–Manatee county line. It immediately crosses another branch of the Seminole Gulf Railway and intersects with Lockwood Ridge Road. It passes a number of residential areas and intersects Honore Avenue before coming to an intersection with Cattlemen Road. At Cattlemen Road, it passes the Mall at University Town Center and its surrounding commercial areas before coming to a diverging diamond interchange with I-75.

CR 610 officially terminates at I-75, though University Parkway continues east another six miles (9.7 km) through Lakewood Ranch.

== History ==
The route that would become University Parkway was originally a rural road from US 301 east. At the time, US 301 turned west at University Parkway and continued north to Bradenton along present-day 15th Street (301 Boulevard). US 301 north of University Parkway would not be moved to its current alignment until 1985.

University Parkway was extended east to connect with I-75 by the time the freeway opened through the area in 1981. It was designated as SR 610.

University Parkway was heavily expanded in the early 1990s. At this time, it was widened to a multi-lane divided road from US 301 to I-75. The widening was jointly funded by both Sarasota and Manatee counties. Around the same time, University Parkway was extended west as a four-lane road from US 301 southwest to Desoto Road (CR 778). Desoto Road from there west to US 41 was also widened to four lanes, which then became part of University Parkway linking it to US 41 and Sarasota–Bradenton International Airport. The road between US 301 and Desoto Road was built on the route of a former railroad spur that once linked the two railroad lines in the area (part of the spur is still in place near US 301).

University Parkway was also extended west from I-75 to provide access to the newly-developed Lakewood Ranch by the time the first phase of that community was complete in 1995.

In 2017, University Parkway's interchange with I-75 was converted to a diverging diamond interchange. It was the first diverging diamond interchange in the state of Florida and it is one of the largest diverging diamond interchanges in the country.

== Major intersections ==
County	Location	mi	km	Destinations	Notes
Sarasota	Sarasota	0.0	0.0	US 41 (Tamiami Trail)	
Sarasota–Manatee county line		2.0	3.2	US 301 (Washington Boulevard)	
Sarasota–Manatee county line		3.6	5.8	Lockwood Ridge Road	
Sarasota–Manatee county line		6.2	10.0	Honore Avenue	
Sarasota–Manatee county line		6.7	10.8	Cattlemen Road	
Sarasota–Manatee county line		7.1	11.4	I-75 – Tampa, Naples	Exit 213 on I-75
1.000 mi = 1.609 km; 1.000 km = 0.621 mi
