= Hernando de Soto Bridge (Florida) =

Bridge in Florida, United States

Hernando DeSoto Bridge
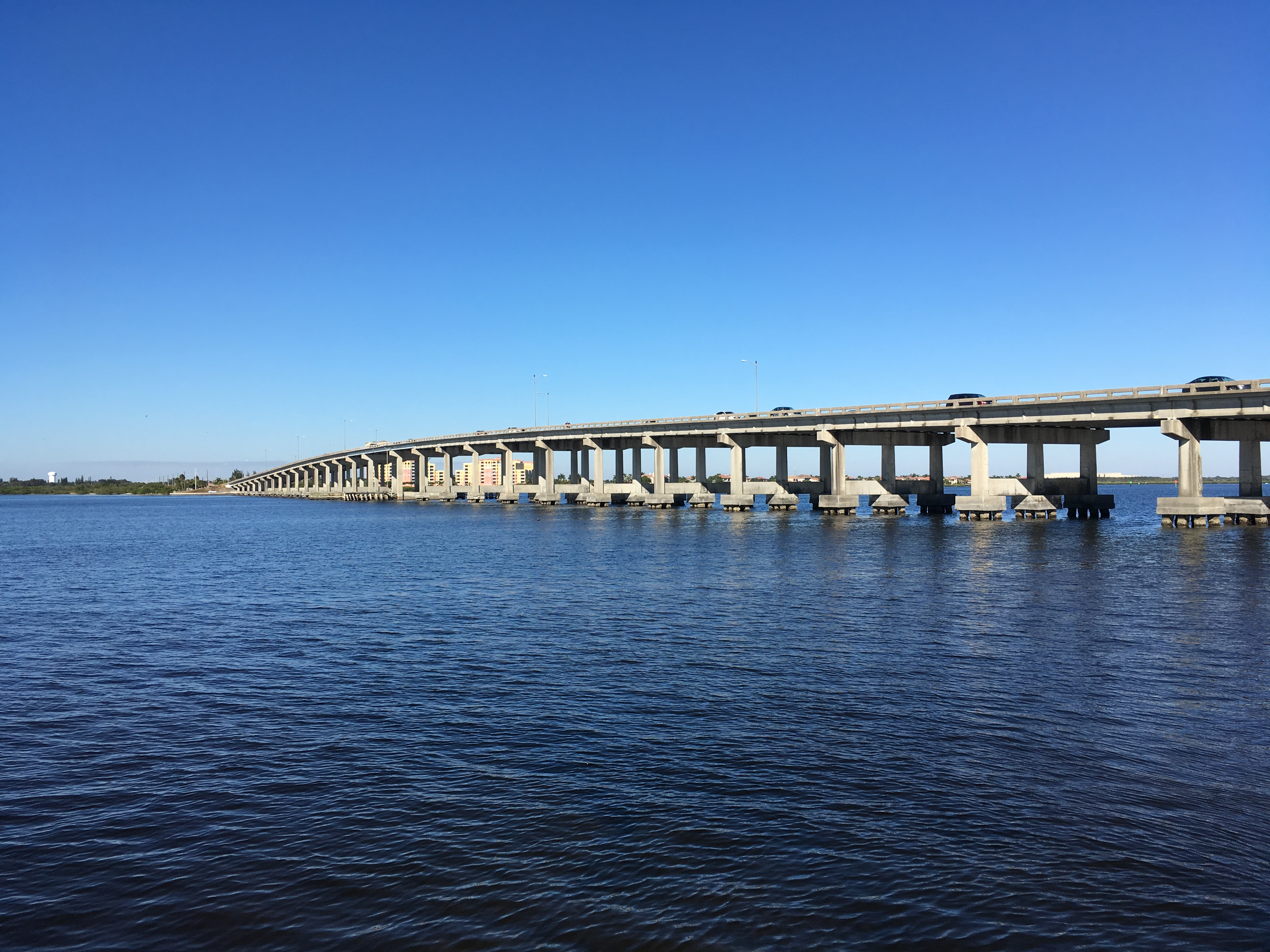
- View of Desoto Bridge from Bradenton Riverwalk
- Coordinates: 27°30′13″N 82°33′47″W
- Carries: 4 lanes of US 41 / US 301
- Crosses: Manatee River
- Locale: Palmetto and Bradenton, Florida
- Official name: Hernando DeSoto Bridge
- Other name: DeSoto Bridge
- Named for: Hernando de Soto
- Owner: FDOT
- Maintained by: FDOT
- ID number: 130053

Characteristics
- Design: Girder
- Material: Concrete, steel
- Total length: 2,334.4 ft (712 m)
- Width: 62 ft (19 m)
- Longest span: 105 ft (32 m)
- No. of spans: 33
- Load limit: 65 short tons (59.0 t)
- Clearance below: 40 ft (12 m)
- No. of lanes: 4

History
- Opened: 1957; 69 years ago

Statistics
- Daily traffic: 66,500 (2018)
- Toll: None

Location
- Interactive map of Hernando DeSoto Bridge

The Hernando Desoto Bridge is a bridge carrying U.S. Highway 41 (US 41) and US 301 over the Manatee River between Palmetto and Bradenton, Florida. The Desoto Bridge is 40 feet (12 m) tall and carries four lanes. It is one of two bridges connecting Bradenton and Palmetto. The other is the Green Bridge located approximately one-half of a mile (0.80 km) downstream.

== History ==
The Desoto Bridge was built in 1957 in an effort to realign US 41 and US 301 through Bradenton and Palmetto. Prior to 1957, those routes crossed the Manatee River a short distance downstream on the original Green Bridge (part of which has become a fishing pier after the Green Bridge was replaced in 1986).

== Future ==
Florida Department of Transportation (FDOT) is evaluating several options on replacing the bridge to increase its traffic capacity. More than one-third of vehicles crossing the bridge is pass-through traffic, drivers who do not have the cities of Bradenton or Palmetto as a point of origin or destination.
