= SunTran (Ocala) =

Bus transportation operator in Ocala, Florida

Ocala SunTran
- Headquarters: 2100 NE 30th Avenue
- Locale: Ocala, Florida
- Service area: Marion County, Florida
- Service type: bus service
- Routes: 6
- Fuel type: Diesel
- Operator: RATP Dev
- Website: SunTran.org

The Ocala SunTran is the public transportation agency that serves Marion County, Florida. Service operates Monday through Saturday.

== Route list ==
Number	Name	Route
1	Green	Downtown Transfer Station - NE 5th Street - Watula - 2nd Street - 19th Avenue - 3rd Street - 25th Avenue - E Silver Springs - Walmart at Silver Springs (back Silver Springs - NE 55th Avenue - 35th Street - 36th Avenue - 14th Street - 25th Avenue - 7th Street - 28th Avenue - 3rd Street - ... - DTS)
2	Blue	DTS - N Magnolia - Bonnie Heath - NW 10th Street - 22nd Ct - 14th Street - Martin Luther King Jr. - SW 16th Avenue - 12th Street - 17th Street - 9th Avenue - 20th Street - 12th Avenue - 17th Street - SE 17th Street - Maricamp - Health Department - 24th Street - 36th Avenue - 17th Street - 30th Avenue - 18th Street - 32nd Avenue - 24th Street - Maricamp Road - 17th Street - S Magnolia - SE 3rd Avenue - Watula - DTS)
3	Purple	DTS - N Magnolia/NE 1st Avenue - NW 3rd Street - N Pine - NW 2nd Street - 7th Avenue - 4th Street - 23rd Avenue - W Silver Springs - SW 27th Avenue - 5th Street - 27th Avenue - W Silver Springs - SW 33rd Avenue - 31st Avenue - College of Central Florida Ocala Campus - SW College - Paddock Mall (back SW 32nd Avenue - 34th Street - 27th Avenue - 10th Street - 23rd Avenue - NW 23rd Avenue - ... - DTS)
4	Orange	DTS - N Magnolia/NE 1st Avenue - SW 10th Street (back 10th Street - S Pine - 17th Street - 1st Avenue) - 16th Avenue - 12th Street - Easy - 27th Avenue - 42nd Street - 43rd Street - Market Street at Heath Brook (back College - 27th Avenue - Easy - ... - DTS)
5	Red	Health Department - Maricamp - Bahia - Pine - Spring - Emerald - Maricamp - Oak - Lake Weir High School (back Oak Track - Emerald - Maricamp - Oak - Silver - Bahia - Silver - Midway - Maricamp - HD)
6	Yellow	DTS - N Magnolia - Old US Highway 301 - NW 1st Avenue - 28th Street - 14th Avenue - 35th Street - 55th Avenue - E Silver Springs - Walmart at Silver Springs - E Silver Springs - NE 36th Terrace - 8th Pl - 36th Avenue - 35th Street - Jacksonville - 8th Road - 8th Avenue - 9th Street - Watula - DTS
7	Silver	serving outskirts
9	Brown	Lake Weir High School - SE 108th Terrance Rd - Ocala Rd - SE 100 Ave - SE Sunset Harbor Rd - SE 105th Ave - SE Hwy 42 - US 441 - Summerfield Walmart
