= Lawtey Correctional Institution =

Prison in Bradford County, Florida

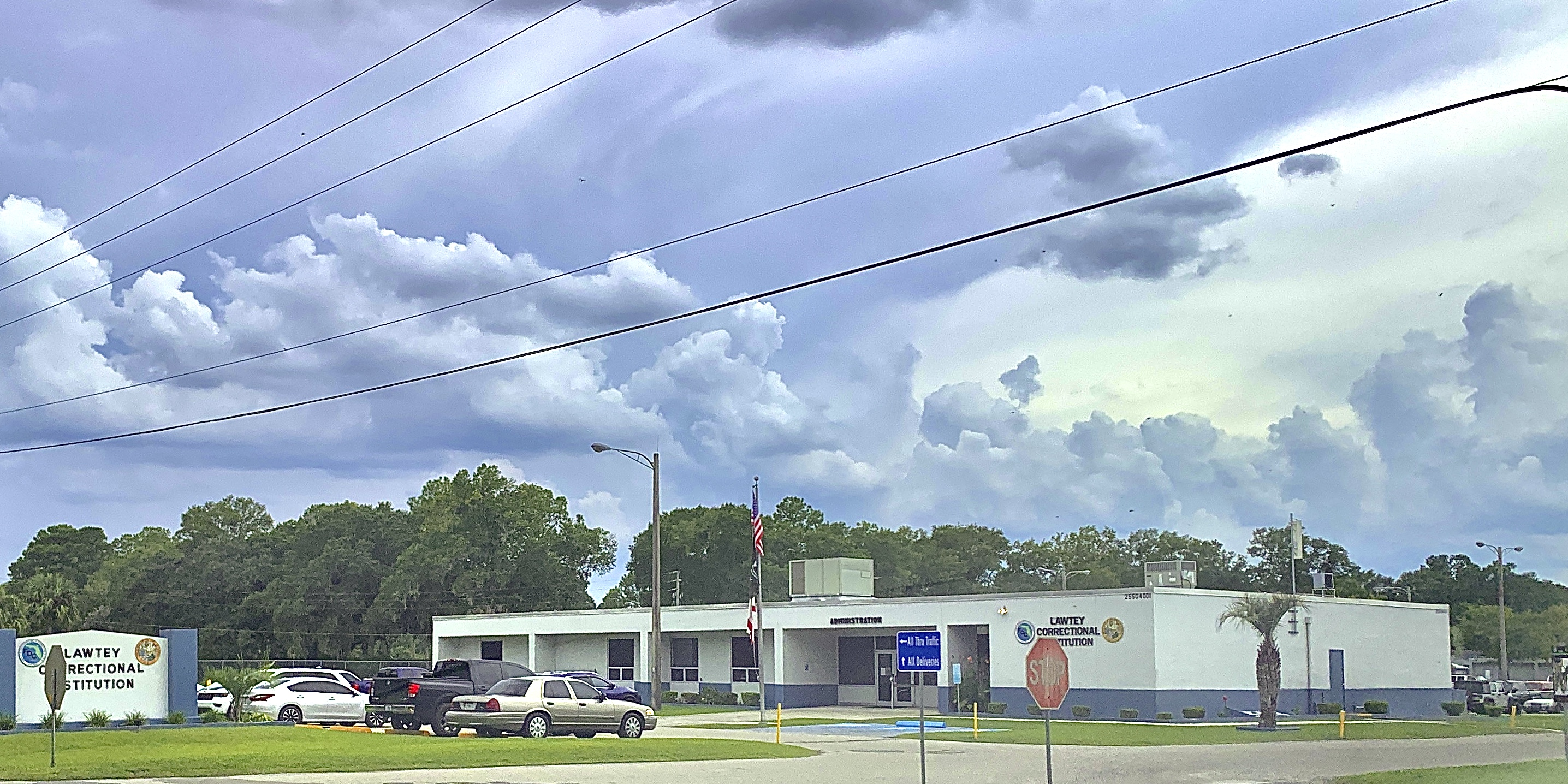
- LAWCI in 2020
- Interactive map of Lawtey Correctional Institution
- Location: 22298 Northeast County Road 200B Lawtey, Florida
- Status: Operational
- Security class: Minimum and medium
- Capacity: 832
- Population: 795 (November 2023)
- Opened: 1973
- Managed by: Florida Department of Corrections
- Warden: Clayton Smith

Lawtey Correctional Institution (LAWCI) is a state prison for men located in Lawtey, Florida, owned and operated by the Florida Department of Corrections. The facility was established in 1973 as a Community Vocational Center Housing for work release inmates. In 1977 it switched to being a major institution housing adult male inmates. As of 2023, the facility has a capacity for 832 inmates at minimum and medium security levels.

== Faith-based system ==
In 2004, Lawtey Correctional Institution was converted into a male Faith- and Character-Based Institution (FCBI), making faith and personal development central parts of its programming. The system is voluntary and open to inmates of any faith, and it includes religious services, character education, and other rehabilitative activities intended to support responsible behavior and reintegration.
