= Florida Central and Western Railroad =

Historic railroad in Florida

Overview
- Locale: North Central Florida and the Florida Panhandle
- Dates of operation: 1837–1900

Technical
- Track gauge: 4 ft 8 1/2 in (1,435 mm) standard gauge

The Florida Central and Western Railroad was a rail line built in the late 1800s that ran from Jacksonville west across North Central Florida and the part Florida Panhandle through Lake City and Tallahassee before coming to an end at Chattahoochee. The line was later part of the Seaboard Air Line Railroad network from 1903 to 1967, and was primarily their Tallahassee Subdivision. The full line is still in service today and is now part of the Florida Gulf and Atlantic Railroad.

== History ==
=== Construction and early years ===
From Jacksonville west to Lake City, the Florida Central and Western Railroad was first built by the Florida, Atlantic and Gulf Central Railroad (not to be confused with the Florida Gulf and Atlantic Railroad, the current operator of the line). The Florida, Atlantic and Gulf Central Railroad (FA&GC) was chartered on January 24, 1851 by Abel Seymour Baldwin (the namesake of Baldwin, Florida) and construction began at Lake City in 1857. During the Civil War, the railroad figured in the Battle of Olustee when Union Brigadier General Truman Seymour led troops west toward Lake City along the line, destroying the junction at Baldwin, and then engaging Confederate troops near Olustee Station. The tracks and junction were rebuilt after the war, but the railroad defaulted on its payments to the Florida Internal Improvement Fund.

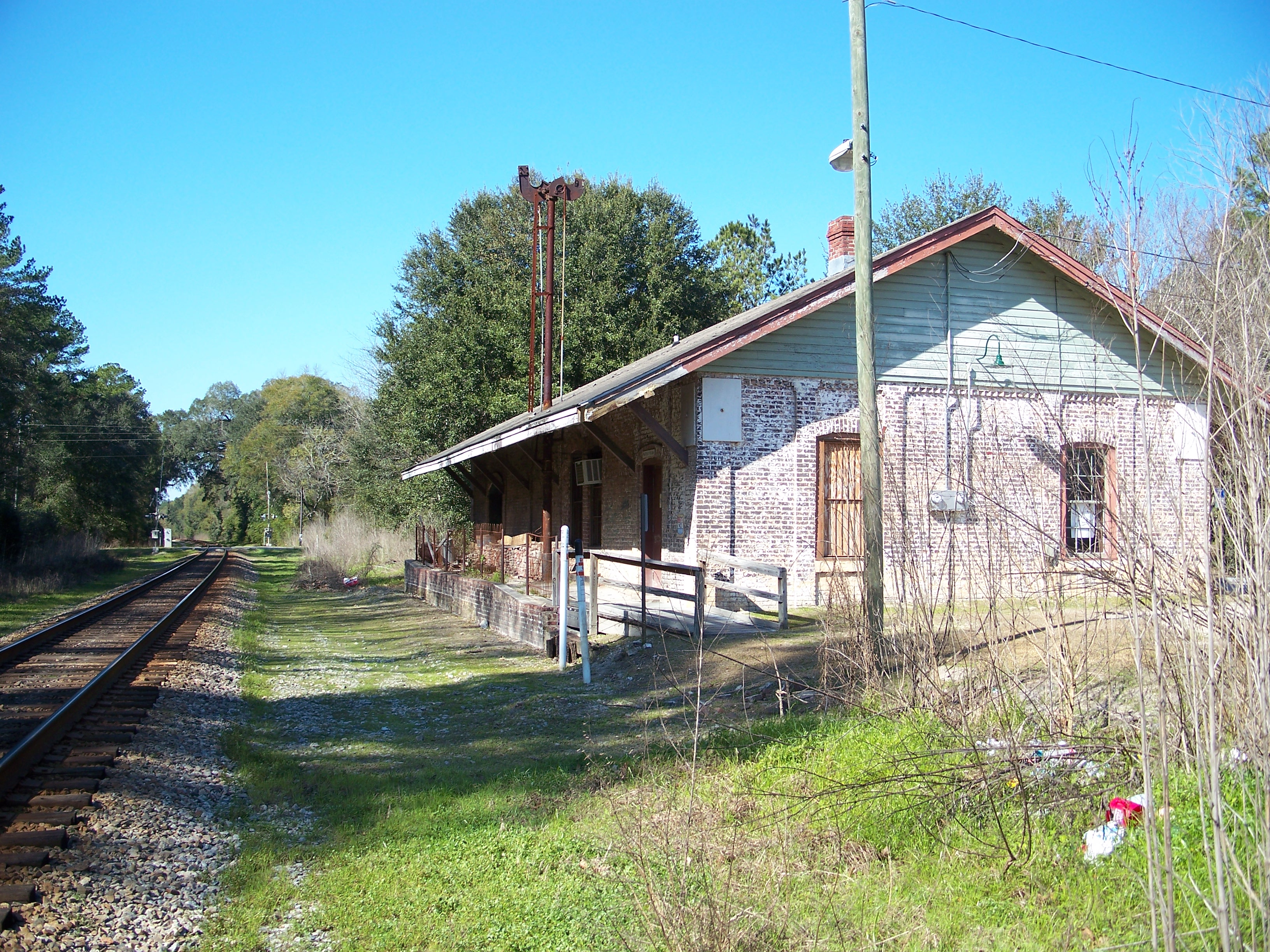
Depot in Lloyd built by the Pensacola and Georgia Railroad. The depot remained in service until 1966, and it still stands today.

From Lake City to Tallahassee, the Florida Central and Western was built by the Pensacola and Georgia Railroad (P&G). The Pensacola and Georgia Railroad was chartered in January 1853, and was to be built east from Pensacola, Florida, but instead started at Tallahassee and was built east. It reached Lake City, Florida in 1860 where it connected to the Florida, Atlantic and Gulf Central. The P&G also built a short branch from Drifton north to Monticello. In 1855, the P&G also took over the Tallahassee Railroad, which ran south from Tallahassee to the port at St. Marks, Florida on the Gulf of Mexico. The P&G then built from Tallahassee west to four miles (6 km) short of Quincy, stopping in 1863 in the middle of the American Civil War.

George W. Swepson, a notorious scalawag, purchased both the P&G and the FA&GC in 1868. After renaming the FA&GC the Florida Central Railroad, set his carpetbagger protégé, Milton S. Littlefield, a former Union general known as the "Prince of Carpetbaggers", loose in Tallahassee to buy, cheat, and otherwise defraud Florida legislators in order to obtain a new charter for a railroad that Littlefield promised would be extended west from Quincy to Pensacola.

Backed by $6 million in capitalization, the P&G was reorganized as the Jacksonville, Pensacola and Mobile Railroad in June 1869 with Littlefield as president. The original charter did not consolidate the Florida Central Railroad into the JP&M; this did not occur until the Florida legislature amended the charter in 1870. Littlefield and Swepson then launched a major swindle, personally enriching themselves from the sales of company bonds to unwitting investors. Due to the embezzling of such funds, the company was unable to extend the line to Pensacola, reaching only an additional 20 miles to Chattahoochee instead. By 1879, the U.S. Supreme Court had a lien placed on the railroad's assets.

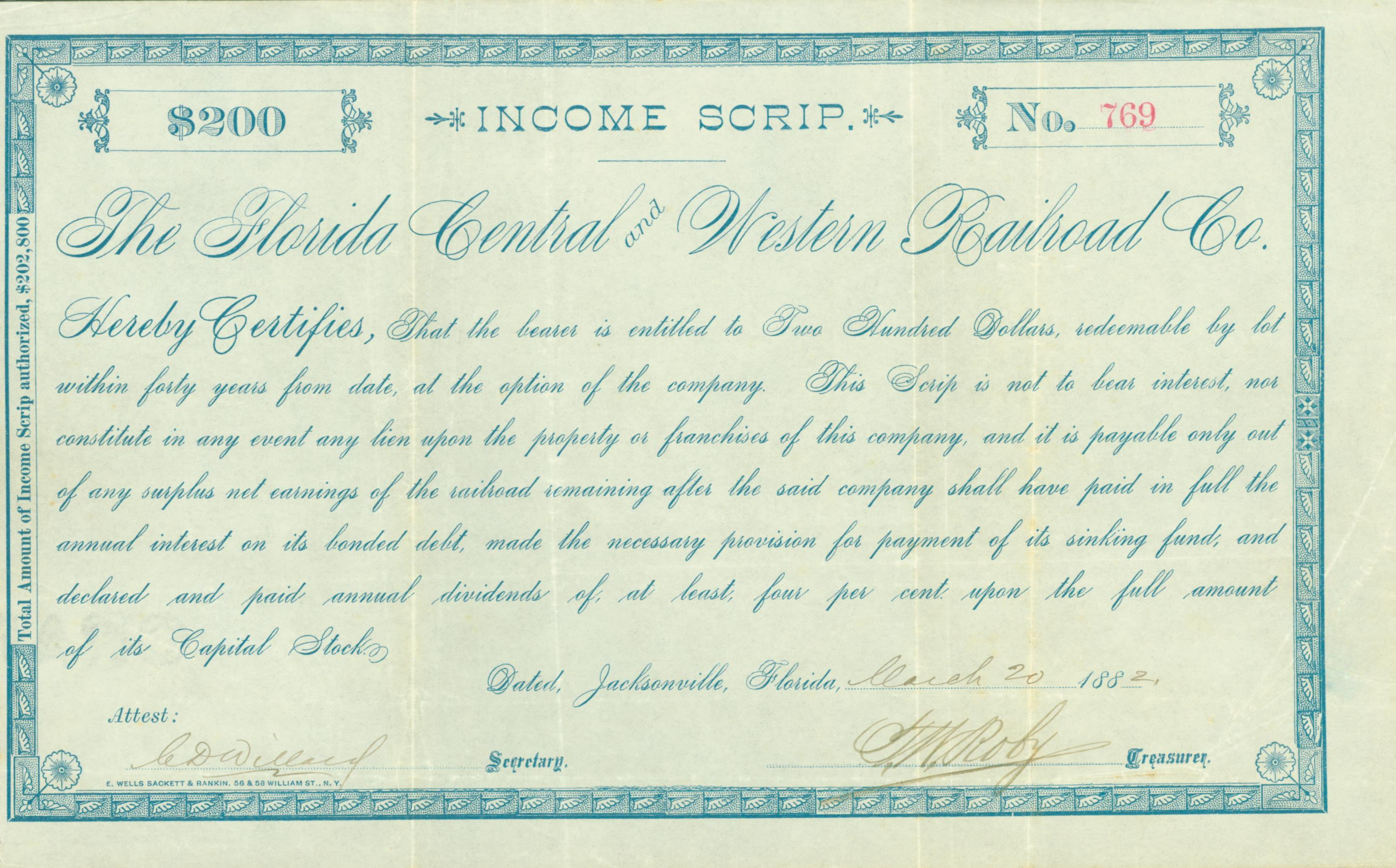
Income Script of the Florida Central and Western Railroad Company, issued 20 March 1882

In 1882, the JP&M and the Florida Central were both acquired by Sir Edward Reed, and were renamed together as the Florida Central and Western Railroad. Two years later, Reed brought the Florida Central and Western and several other Florida railroads he had purchased under the umbrella of what was named the Florida Railway and Navigation Company, which was renamed the Florida Central and Peninsular Railroad (FC&P) in 1888. In 1900, a year after purchasing the majority of FC&P stock, the newly organized Seaboard Air Line Railway leased the FC&P and, in 1903, acquired it outright.

=== Seaboard Air Line ownership ===
Tallahassee Subdivision

Overview
- Status: Still operating under successor company
- Owner: Seaboard Air Line Railroad
- Termini: Baldwin, Florida; Chattahoochee, Florida

Technical
- Line length: 189.4 mi (304.8 km)
- Electrification: No
- Signalling: Centralized traffic control east of Tallahassee

The line would become an important route for the Seaboard Air Line. The easternmost 17 miles of the line from Jacksonville to Baldwin became part if the Seaboard's main line. The rest of the line from Baldwin to Chattahoochee became the Seaboard's Tallahassee Subdivision. The branch to Monticello became the Monticello Subdivision, while track from Tallahassee to St. Marks became the Wakulla Subdivision.

The Tallahassee Subdivision was notably used by the Seaboard Air Line for passenger service from Jacksonville to New Orleans, which was operated jointly with the Louisville and Nashville Railroad. This daily passenger service was known as the New Orleans-Florida Express and the New Orleans-Florida Limited before being renamed the Gulf Wind in 1949.

In addition to passenger service, the line also carried two daily Red Ball freight trains and a local freight train six days a week round-trip from Baldwin to Tallahassee in the 1950s. A through freight train also ran from Tallahassee to Chattahoochee daily at the time. The line was busy enough in the 1950s to warrant the installation of Centralized traffic control along the Tallahassee Subdivision from Baldwin to a point just west of Tallahassee.

=== Later years ===
In 1967, the Seaboard Air Line merged with their long-time rival, the Atlantic Coast Line Railroad (ACL). The Tallahassee Subdivision crossed or connected with ACL branch lines in Jacksonville, Mattox, Live Oak, Drifton, and Chattahoochee. After the merger was complete, the company was named the Seaboard Coast Line Railroad (SCL). In 1980, the Seaboard Coast Line's parent company merged with the Chessie System, creating the CSX Corporation. The CSX Corporation initially operated the Chessie and Seaboard Systems separately until 1986, when they were merged into CSX Transportation.

The Gulf Wind continued to operate on the Tallahassee Subdivision under the Seaboard Coast Line until 1971, when passenger service was taken over by Amtrak. This left the line without passenger service until 1993, when Amtrak extended the Sunset Limited to Miami via Jacksonville. The Sunset Limited ran the line until late 2005 due to damage as a result of Hurricane Katrina further west. The Sunset Limited has terminated in New Orleans ever since.

== Current operations ==
The Florida Gulf and Atlantic Railroad took over operation of the former Florida Central and Western Railroad on June 1, 2019, after its parent company, RailUSA, acquired the line from CSX Transportation. As part of the deal, the Florida Gulf and Atlantic also took over the former Pensacola and Atlantic Railroad west to Pensacola, and track from Tallahassee north to Attapulgus, Georgia.

== Historic stations ==
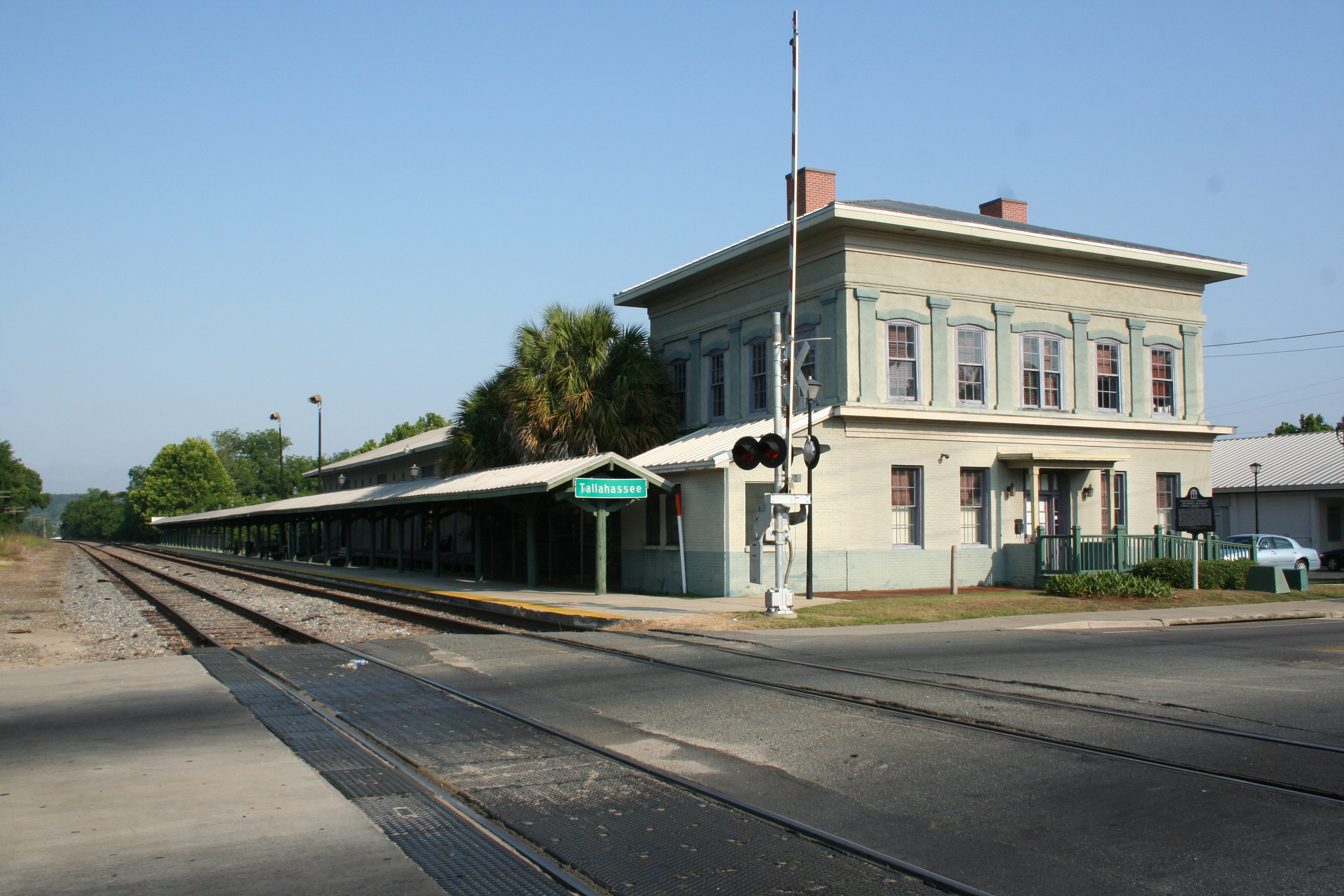
Tallahassee station

Milepost	City/Location	Station	Connections and notes
SP 635.4	Jacksonville	Jacksonville	junction with: Fernandina and Jacksonville Railroad (FC&P/SAL); East Florida Railway (ACL); Jacksonville, Tampa and Key West Railway (ACL); Atlantic, Valdosta and Western Railway (GSF/SOU); Florida East Coast Railway Main Line
	Jacksonville	West Jacksonville	
SP 641.6	Jacksonville	Marietta	
SP 652.5	Baldwin	Baldwin	junction with Florida Railroad (FC&P/SAL)
SP 656.3		Mattox	junction with Jacksonville and Southwestern Railroad (ACL)
SP 661.4	Macclenny	Macclenny	known as Darbyville prior to 1890
SP 663.8	Glen St. Mary	Glen St. Mary	
		Drake	
		Taliaferros Junction	
SP 670.7	Sanderson	Sanderson	
		Woodstock	
		Mann's Spur	
SP 680.6	Olustee	Olustee	
SP 685.1		Mount Carrie	
SP 690.7	Watertown	Watertown	
SP 693.1	Lake City	Lake City	junction with: Live Oak, Tampa and Charlotte Harbor Railroad Lake City Branch (ACL); Georgia Southern and Florida Railway (SOU)
		Ogden	
		McKinley	
SP 704.5	Wellborn	Wellborn	
SP 709.9	Houston	Houston	
SP 715.3	Live Oak	Live Oak	junction with: Live Oak and Rowland's Bluff Railroad (ACL); Live Oak, Tampa and Charlotte Harbor Railroad (ACL)
SP 721.5		Dickert	
	Falmouth	Falmouth	
SP 728.7	Ellaville	Ellaville	
SP 736.3	Lee	Lee	
		West Farm	
SP 743.7	Madison	Madison	
		Champaign	
SP 757.4	Greenville	Greenville	
SP 764.9	Aucilla	Aucilla	
SP 772.3	Drifton	Drifton	junction with: Monticello Branch; Perry Cutoff (ACL)
SPB 776.5	Monticello	Monticello	located on Monticello Branch
		Braswell	
SP 781.2	Lloyd	Lloyd	
	Capitola	Capitola	
SP 787.8	Chaires	Chaires	
SP 799.3	Tallahassee	Tallahassee	junction with: Tallahassee Railroad (SAL); Georgia Florida and Alabama Railroad (SAL)
		Ocklocknee	
		Lawrence	
SP 811.4	Midway	Midway	
SP 823.3	Quincy	Quincy	
SP 828.7	Gretna	Gretna	
SP 832.0	Mount Pleasant	Mount Pleasant	
		Jamieson	
	Chattahoochee	Chattahoochee	
SP 841.9	Chattahoochee	River Junction	junction with: Pensacola and Atlantic Railroad (L&N); Apalachicola Northern Railroad; Chattahoochee and East Pass Railroad (SF&W/ACL)
