= Florida Limited =

Florida Limited was the name of several trains:

- the Seaboard Florida Limited, which operated New York—Tampa 1901-1930 and was later renamed the Palmland
- the New Orleans-Florida Limited, which operated New Orleans—Jacksonville 1924–1949, heavyweight predecessor of the Gulf Wind
- unofficially, a through coach interchanged between the Capitol Limited and the Silver Star 1984-1986
