= Drifton, Florida =

Unincorporated community in Florida, U.S.

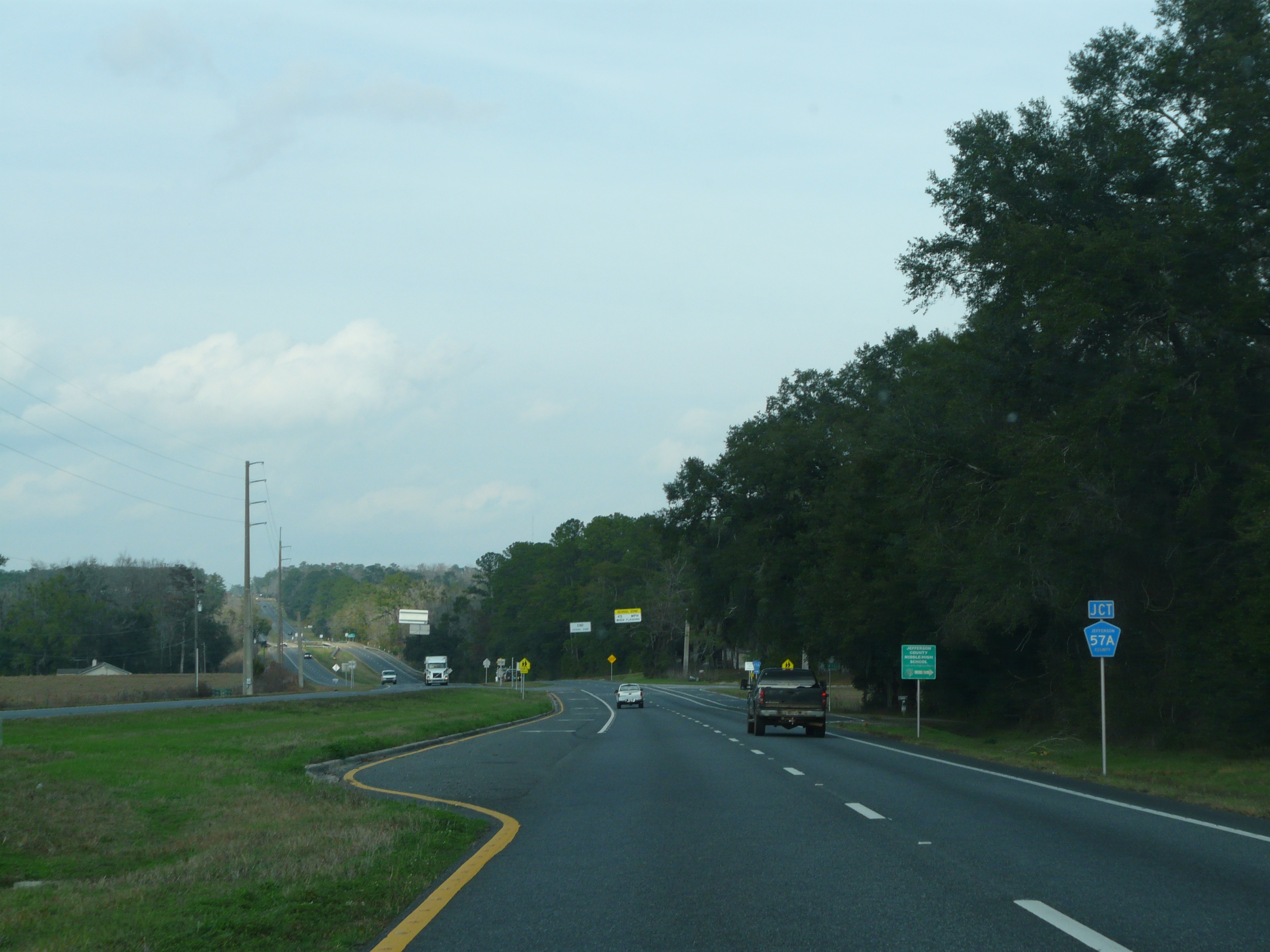
Northbound U.S. Route 19 in Drifton

Drifton is an unincorporated community in Jefferson County, Florida, United States. It is located near the intersection of US 19 and County Road 158.

Drifton was formerly the site where the ACL's Southland route crossed at grade the route of SAL's Gulf Wind. East of that crossing was an SAL spur leading to the City of Monticello. The ACL route has long been abandoned, and the former SAL route was acquired from CSX by the Florida Gulf & Atlantic Railroad on June 1, 2019. The SAL Monticello Spur was also abandoned, however a former segment of the right-of-way has been replaced by the Monticello Bike Trail.

== Geography ==
Drifton is located at 30°29′44″N 83°52′46″W.

== Education ==
Jefferson County Schools operates public schools, including Jefferson County Middle / High School.

== Notable person ==
William H. Hay, a major general in the United States Army who commanded the 28th Division in World War I, was born in Drifton.
