= Florida Gulf and Atlantic Railroad =

Shortline railroad in the Florida Panhandle

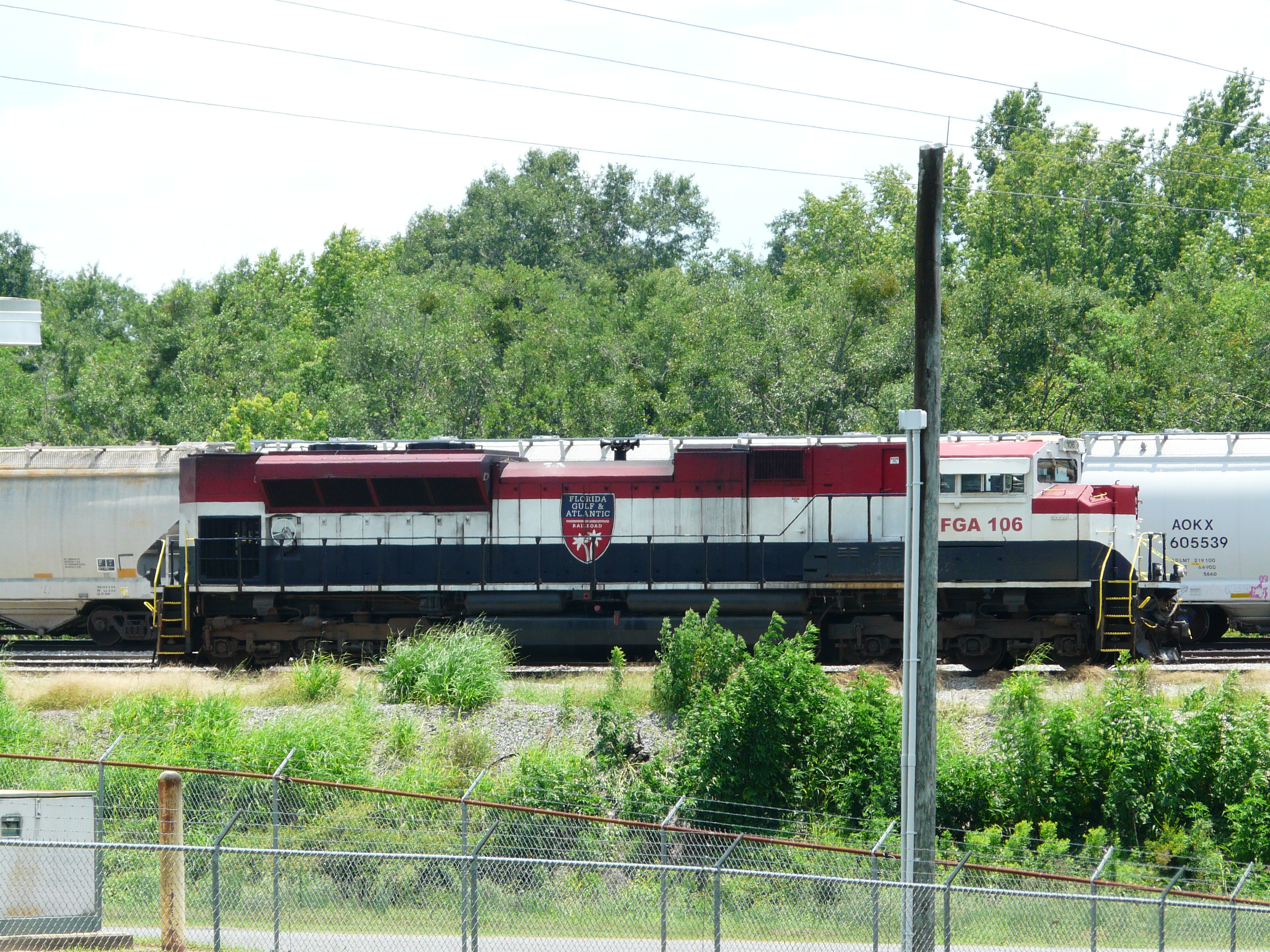
- An FG&A EMD SD70M-2 locomotive at a rail yard in Tallahassee, Florida

Overview
- Headquarters: Tallahassee, Florida
- Reporting mark: FGA
- Locale: Florida Panhandle
- Dates of operation: 2019–present
- Predecessor: Louisville & Nashville Railroad; Seaboard Air Line Railroad; CSX Transportation

Technical
- Track gauge: 4 ft 8 1/2 in (1,435 mm) standard gauge
- Length: 430 miles

Other
- Website: railusa.com/railroads/florida-gulf-atlantic-railroad/

The Florida Gulf and Atlantic Railroad (reporting mark FGA) is a shortline railroad owned and operated by the Pinsly Railroad Company in the Florida Panhandle. The line consists of 430 miles (692 km) of track: a main line from Baldwin, Florida (just west of Jacksonville), through Tallahassee to Pensacola, as well as a branch from Tallahassee north to Attapulgus, Georgia.

The FG&A began operation on June 1, 2019, after Pinsly (originally called RailUSA) acquired the line from CSX Transportation. The FG&A connects with CSX at Baldwin, Pensacola, and Attapulgus; with the AN Railway at Chattahoochee; and with the Bay Line Railroad at Cottondale.

The Jacksonville-Pensacola line was the route of the Gulf Wind streamliner from 1949 to 1971. After two decades of freight-only service, passenger service resumed in 1993 when the route of Amtrak's Sunset Limited was extended beyond New Orleans to Orlando. Amtrak service was suspended in 2005 due to damage to track and trestles by Hurricane Katrina, and only resumed east of New Orleans when Amtrak's new Mardi Gras Service began between New Orleans and Mobile in August 2025.

== Lines and history ==
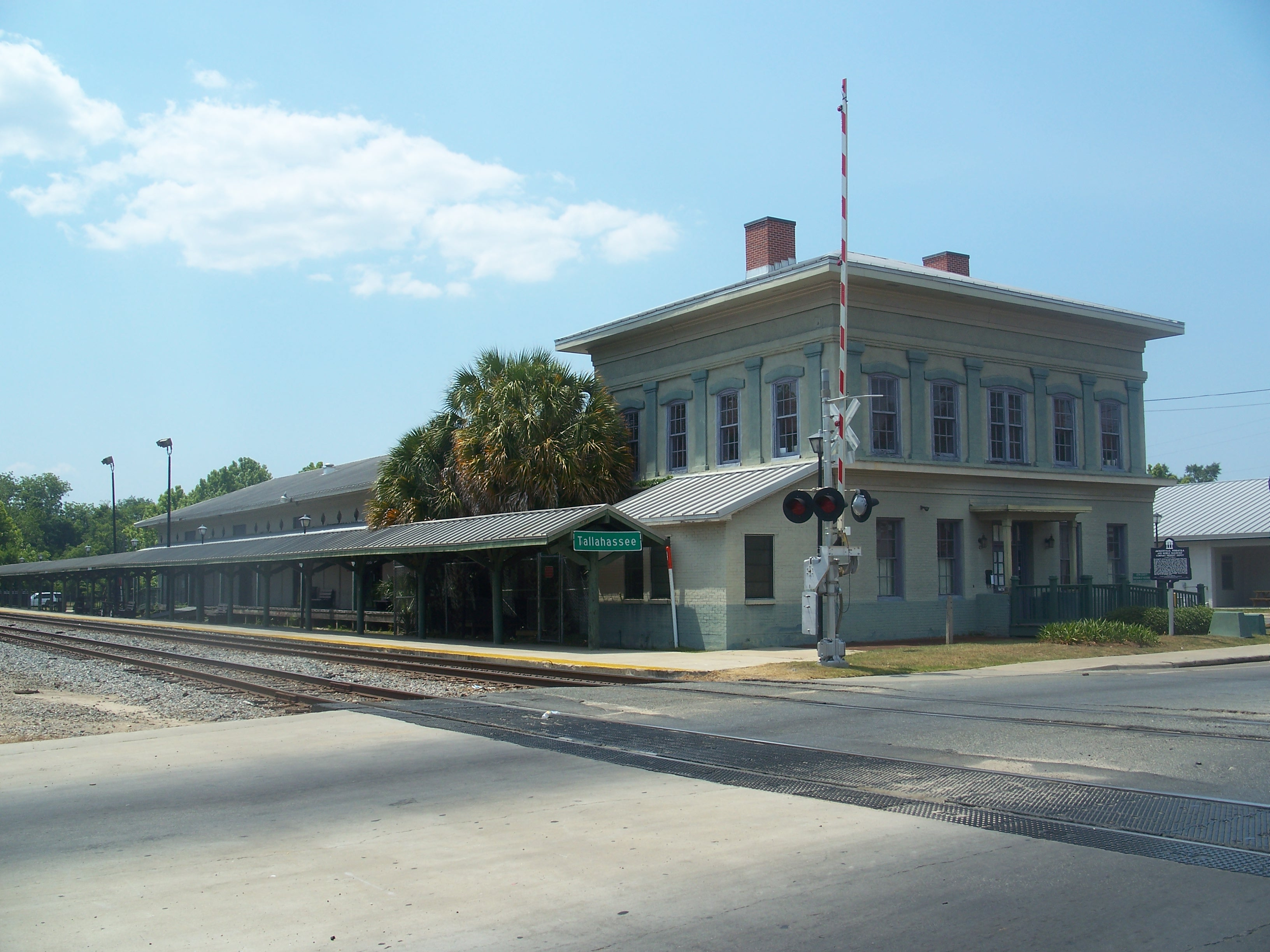
Tallahassee station. The station was used by the Sunset Limited prior to 2005.

The 373 miles of the Florida Gulf & Atlantic Railroad comprise the main line between Baldwin and Pensacola. The main line is known as the Tallahassee Subdivision east of the Chattahoochee River and the P&A Subdivision west of the river. The Florida Gulf & Atlantic Railroad's Bainbridge Subdivision runs as a branch line between Tallahassee north to Attapulgus, Georgia. The system connects with CSX Transportation at each end of the main line in Baldwin and Pensacola, and at the northern end of the Bainbridge Subdivision in Attapulgus. CSX has trackage rights on the FG&A, but plans to use them only if their lines to the north are impassable.

=== Tallahassee Subdivision ===
The Tallahassee Subdivision of the main line was first built as the Florida, Atlantic and Gulf Central Railroad from Lake City to Jacksonville in 1857. The Pensacola and Georgia Railroad built the line between Quincy and Lake City which was completed by 1863. The line was then extended west to Chattahoochee to connect with the newly built Pensacola and Atlantic Railroad.

In 1882, the lines were acquired by Sir Edward Reed, and were renamed together as the Florida Central and Western Railroad. Two years later, Reed brought the Florida Central and Western and several other Florida railroads he had purchased under the umbrella of what was named the Florida Railway and Navigation Company, which, in 1888, was renamed the Florida Central and Peninsular Railroad (FC&P). In 1900, a year after purchasing the majority of FC&P stock, the newly organized Seaboard Air Line Railway (a predecessor of CSX Transportation) leased the FC&P and, in 1903, acquired it outright. CSX previously operated this segment as their Tallahassee Subdivision. The line has a centralized traffic control signal system between Tallahassee and Baldwin.

=== P&A Subdivision ===
The P&A Subdivision of the main line runs west from Chattahoochee to Pensacola, Florida. This segment of the main line was originally built in 1881-1883 by the Louisville and Nashville Railroad, operating it as a subsidiary, the Pensacola and Atlantic Railroad. William D. Chipley and Frederick R. De Funiak (General Manager of the L&N), both of whom are commemorated in the names of towns later built along the P&A line (Chipley and DeFuniak Springs), were among the founding officers of the P&A. The line was merged into the L&N in 1891. In 1982, the L&N was merged into the Seaboard Coast Line Railroad, which in 1986 became part of CSX Transportation, operating this segment as its P&A Subdivision (a reference to the Pensacola and Atlantic Railroad).

=== Bainbridge Subdivision ===
The Bainbridge Subdivision runs from the FG&A main line in Tallahassee north to Attapulgus, Georgia, where it connects to CSX's Bainbridge Subdivision, which continues north to Bainbridge, Georgia. The Bainbridge Subdivision was first built in 1901 by the Georgia Pine Railway. The line was only intended to be a shortline for logging, but since it provided an additional rail route from Georgia into Florida, traffic increased. As a result, the line was renamed the Georgia, Florida and Alabama Railway by the end of 1901. The GF&A Railway bought the Carrabelle, Tallahassee and Georgia Railroad in 1906, which ran from Tallahassee south to Carrabelle.

The Georgia, Florida and Alabama Railway, which extended from Richland, Georgia, to Carrabelle, Florida, at its greatest extent, became part of the Seaboard Air Line Railroad in 1927. The Seaboard lines, after various other mergers, became part of CSX Transportation in 1986.

The line's milepost numbers begin in Tallahassee at 52 and increase from there. This is due to the fact that the numbering still reflects the line's full length to Carrabelle, which was mile 0 before the track between there and Tallahassee was abandoned.
