= Green B. Tillman =

State legislator in Florida

Green B. Tillman was a state legislator in Florida. A Republican, he represented Jefferson County, Florida in the Florida House of Representatives in 1877.

He was African-American. He testified he lived in Aucilla (noted as "Ancilia") in Jefferson County.

== See also ==
- Augustus Tilghman, represented Jefferson County, Florida 1875
- African American officeholders from the end of the Civil War until before 1900
