= Madison station (Florida) =

Madison, FL
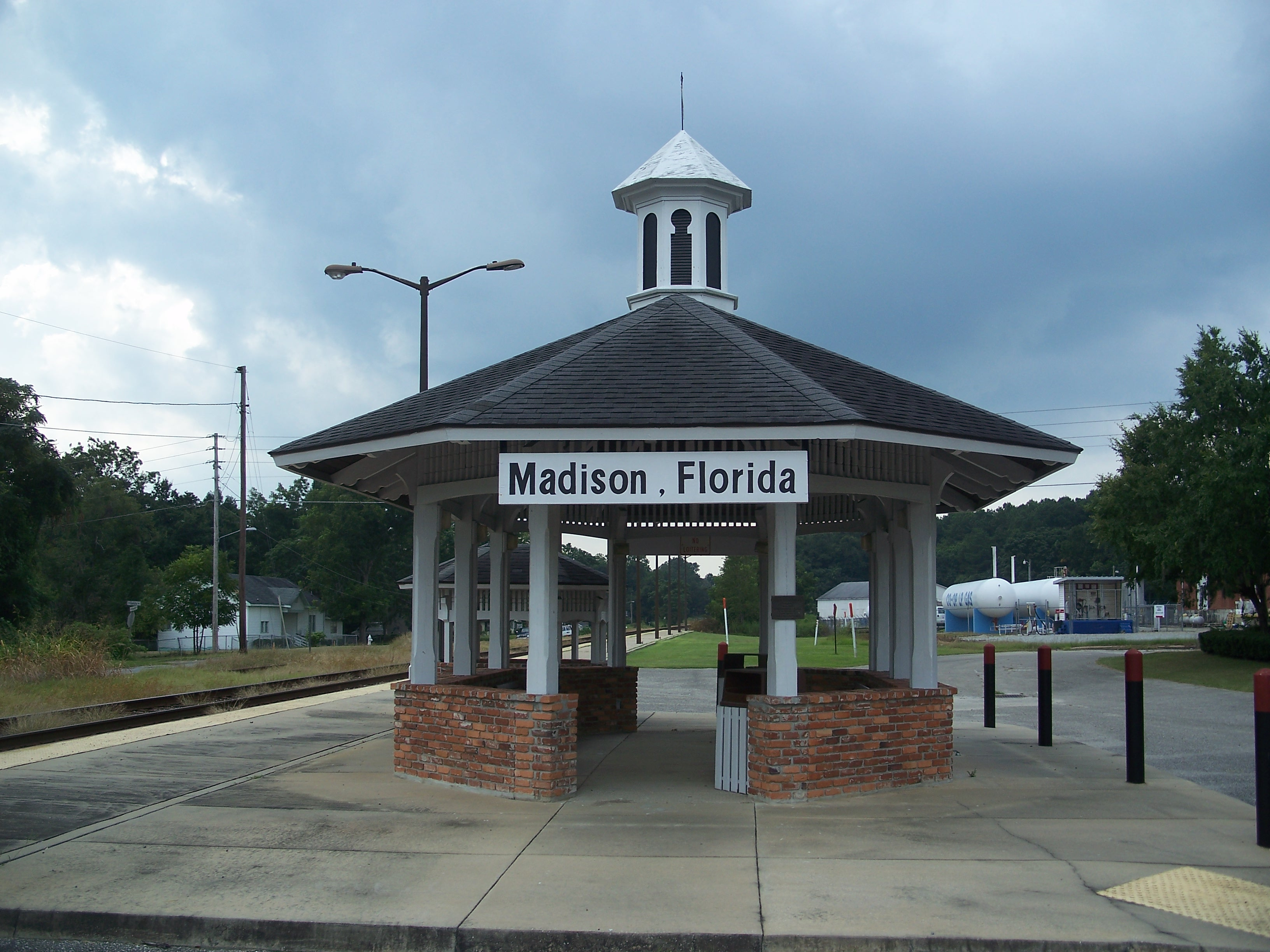

General information
- Location: 1000 South Range Street; Madison, Florida
- Coordinates: 30.459273°N 83.413546°W

Other information
- Status: Closed
- Station code: MDO

History
- Opened: March 31, 1993
- Closed: August 28, 2005 (service suspended)

Former services
Preceding station	Amtrak	Following station
Tallahassee toward Los Angeles	Sunset Limited (1993–2005)	Lake City toward Orlando or Miami
Preceding station	Seaboard Air Line Railroad	Following station
Greenville toward River Junction	Tallahassee Subdivision	West Farm toward Jacksonville
Location

Madison station is a former train station in Madison, Florida. It was served by Amtrak's Sunset Limited, the national railroad passenger system. Service has been suspended since Hurricane Katrina struck the Gulf Coast in 2005. Madison station is unique in that its waiting area consists of gazebos.
