= Dennis-Coxetter House =

Historic house in Florida, United States

- U.S. National Register of Historic Places
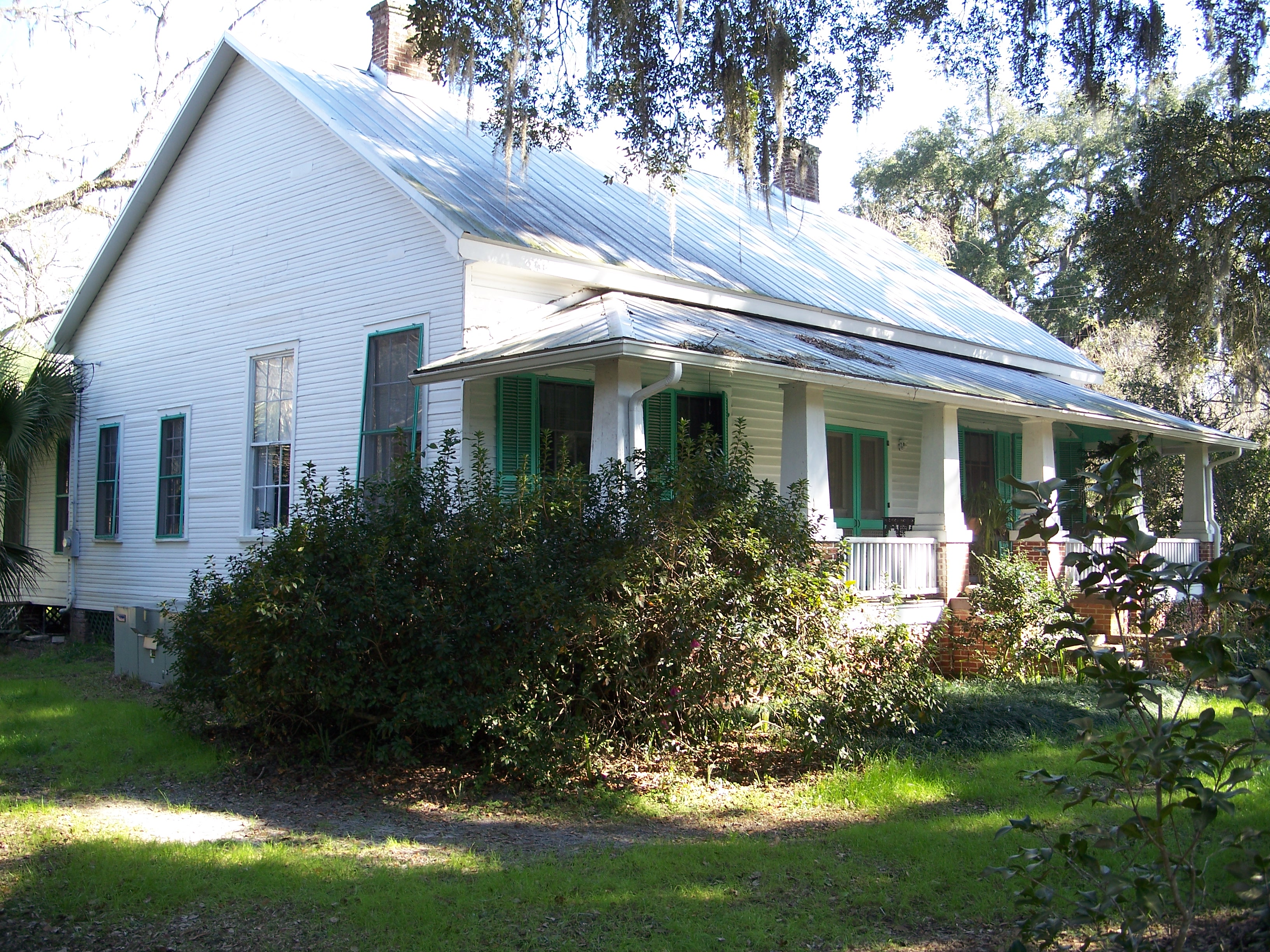

- Location within Florida Location within the United States
- Location: Jct. of SR 158 and 59, Lloyd, Florida
- Coordinates: 30°28′41″N 84°1′23″W
- Area: 1.6 acres (0.65 ha)
- Built: c. 1859
- Architect: Frame Vernacular
- NRHP reference No.: 88002025
- Added to NRHP: October 20, 1988

The Dennis-Coxetter House is a historic house located at the junction of Bond Street and State Road 59 in Lloyd, Florida. It was added to the National Register of Historic Places on October 20, 1988.

The house is one of the earliest buildings of the agricultural village of Lloyd, founded in 1859. It was a summer residence of a leading plantation family of Leon County and Jefferson County.

== Gallery ==
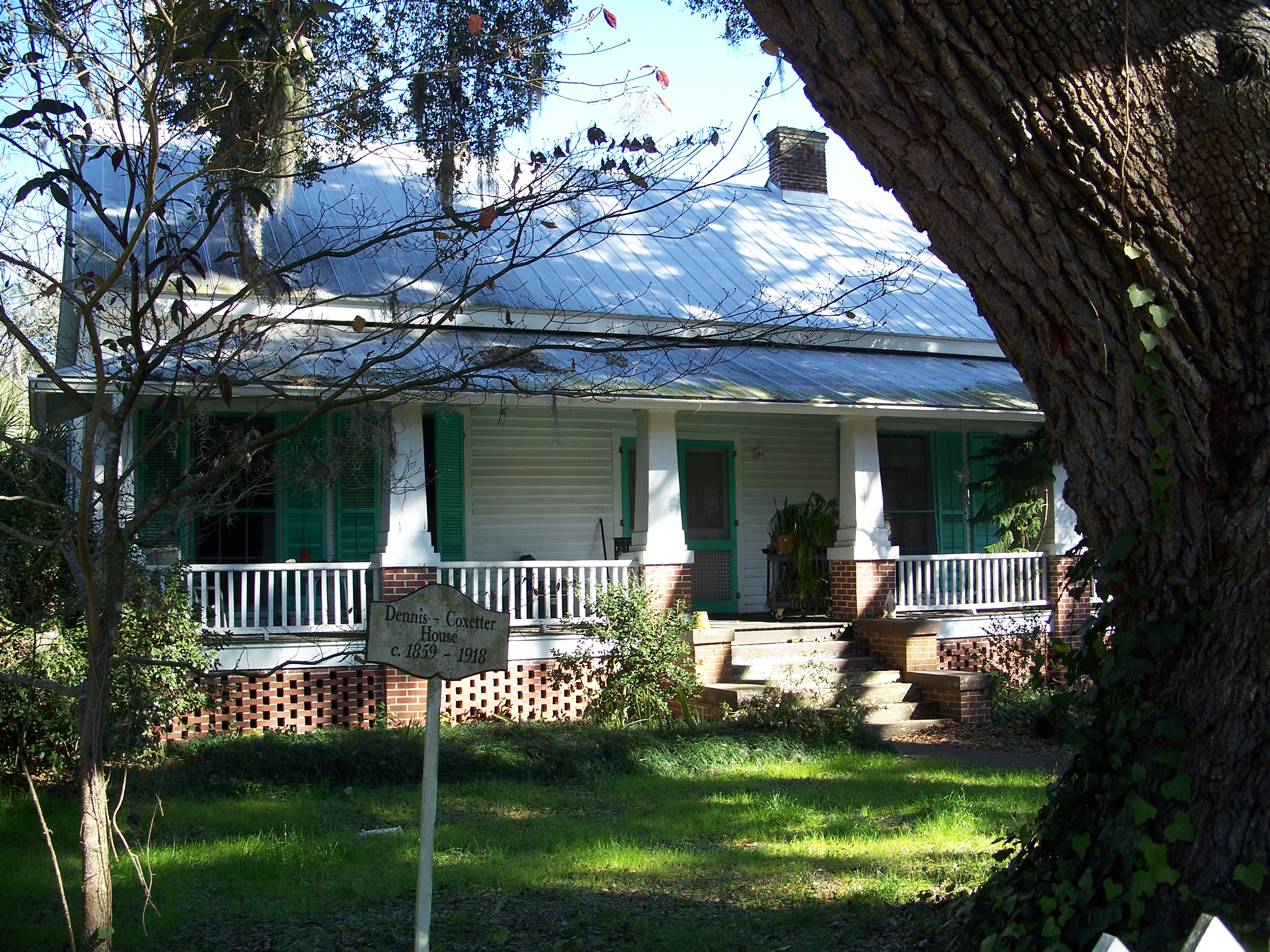

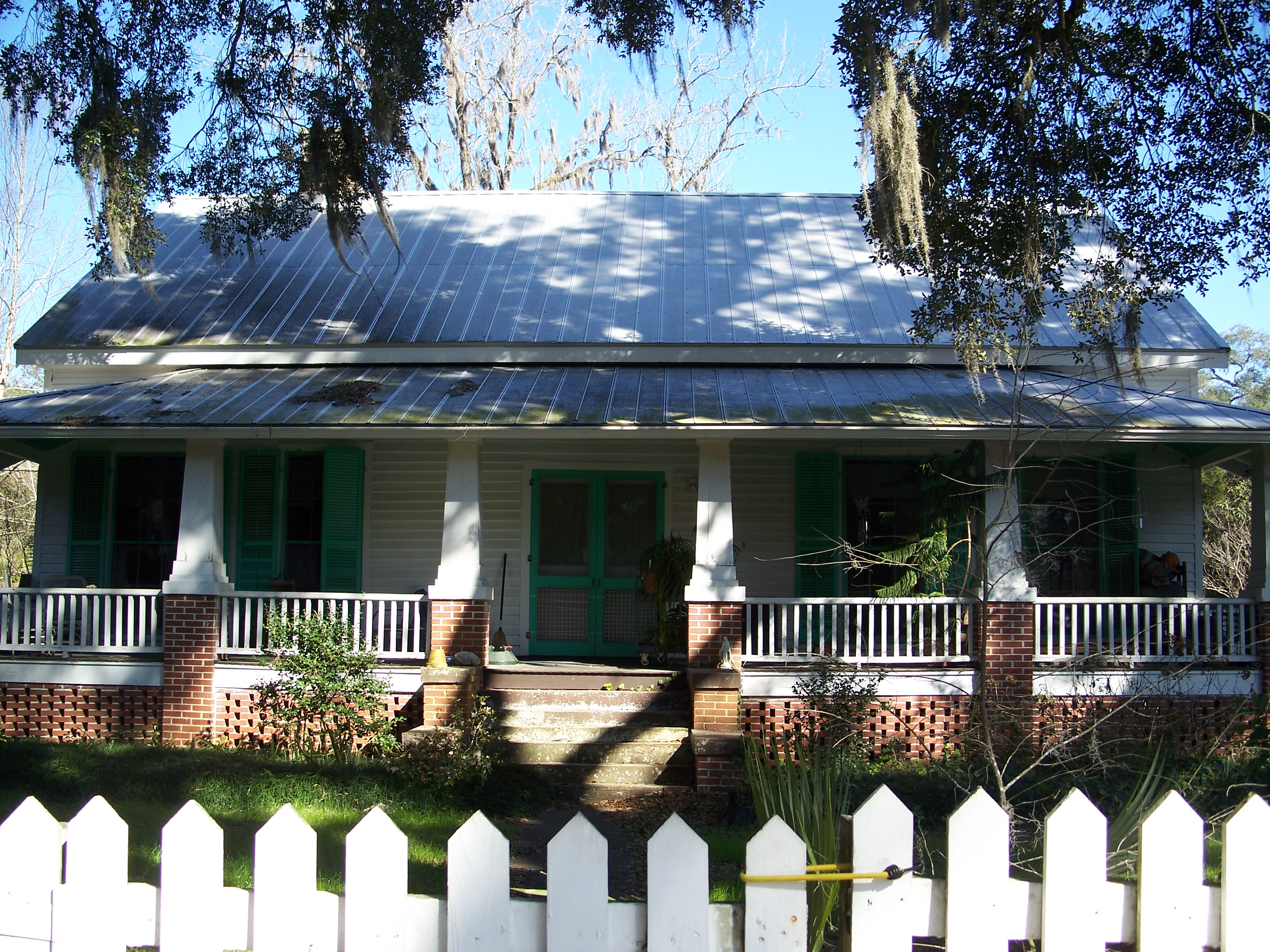

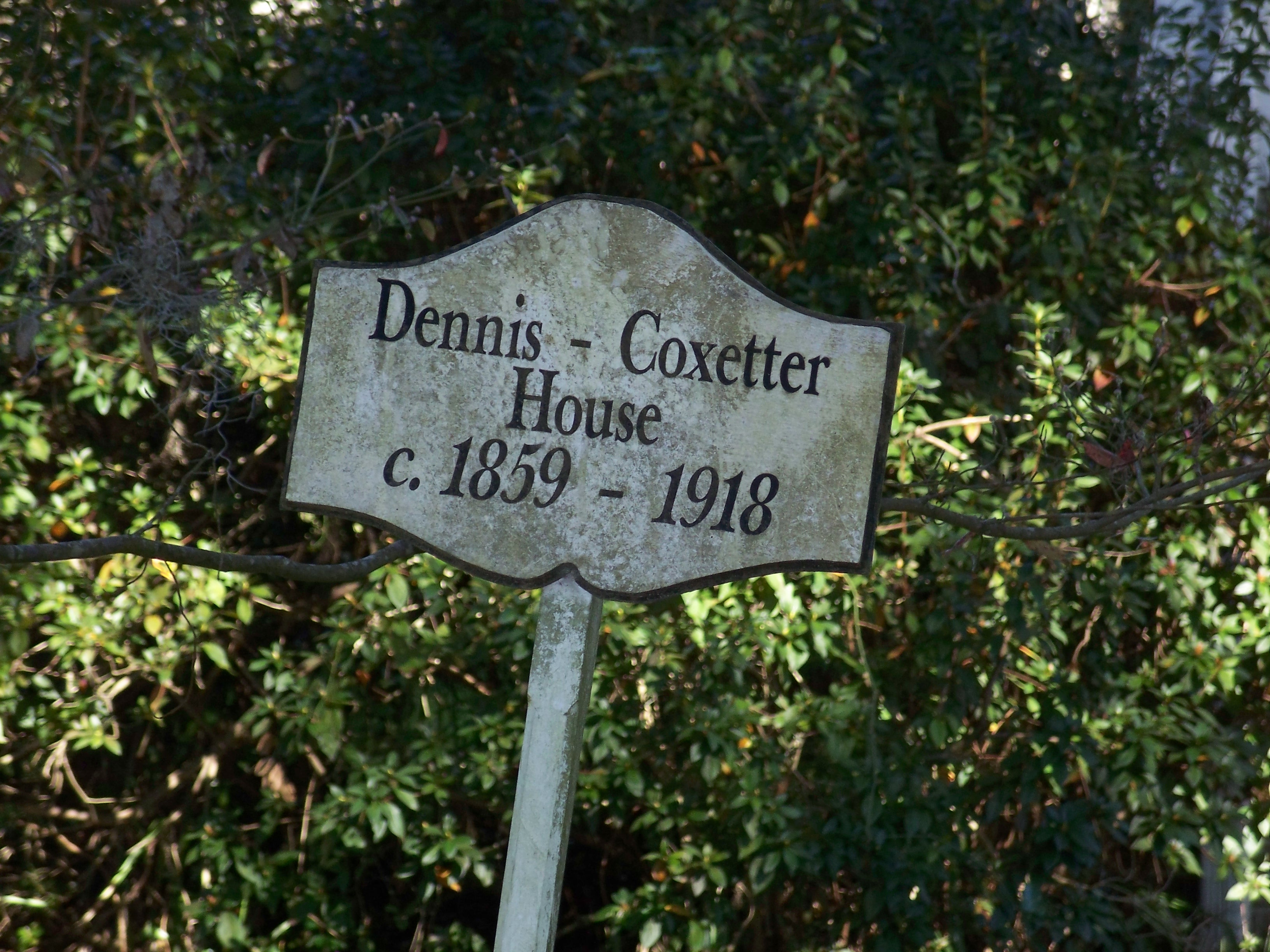
