= Lake City station (Florida) =

Lake City, FL
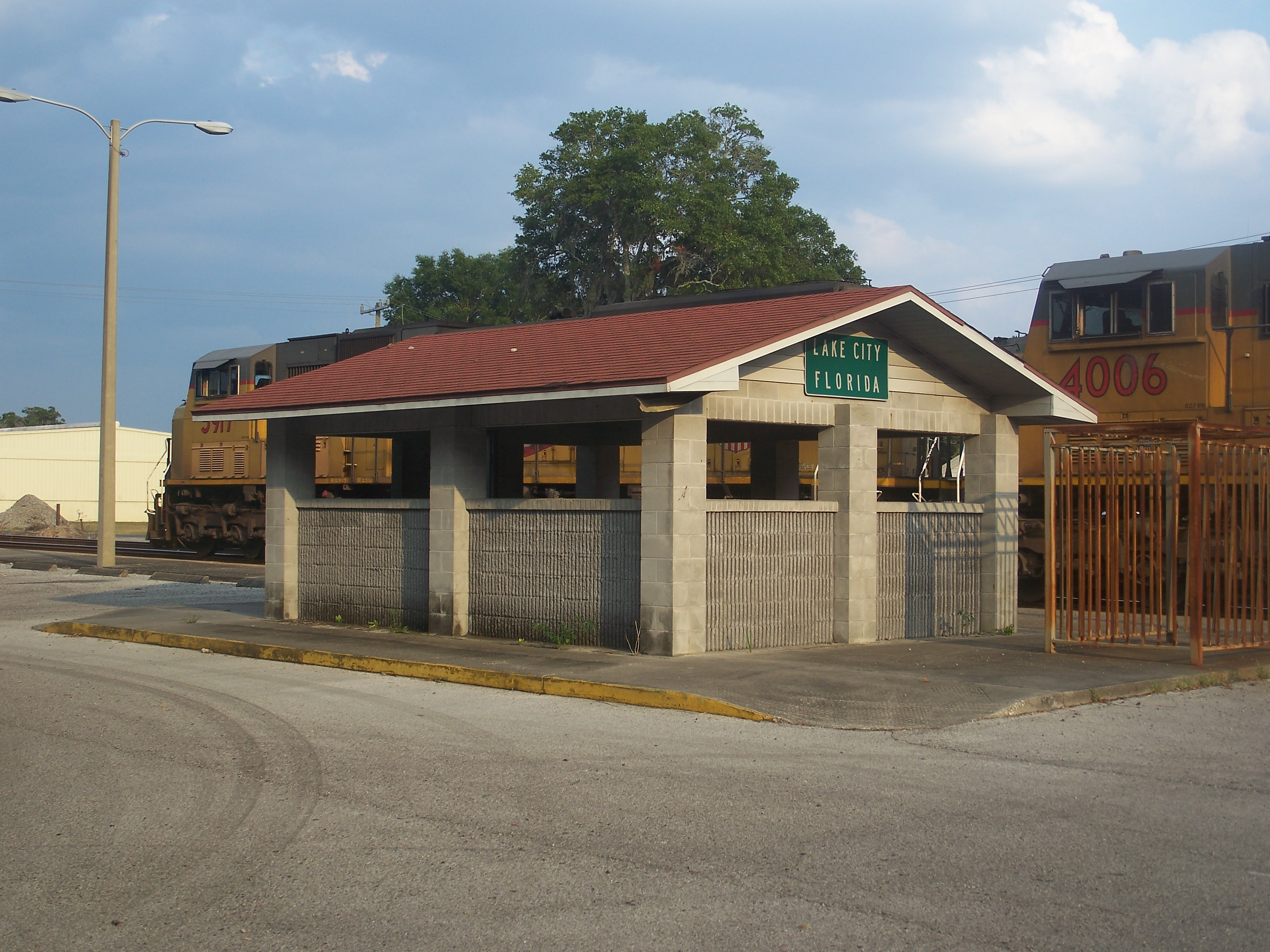

General information
- Location: 1209-1201 NW Kimberly Drive; Lake City, Florida; United States
- Coordinates: 30.197091°N 82.651633°W
- Line: CSXT

Other information
- Status: Closed
- Station code: LEC

History
- Opened: March 31, 1993
- Closed: August 28, 2005 (service suspended)

Former services
Preceding station	Amtrak	Following station
Madison toward Los Angeles	Sunset Limited (1993–2005)	Jacksonville toward Orlando or Miami
Preceding station	Seaboard Air Line Railroad	Following station
Ogden toward River Junction	Tallahassee Subdivision	Watertown toward Jacksonville
Preceding station	Southern Railway	Following station
Winfield toward Valdosta	Valdosta – Palatka	Watertown Junction toward Palatka
Location

Lake City station is a former train station in Lake City, Florida. It was formerly served by Amtrak, the national railroad passenger system. Service was suspended after Hurricane Katrina struck the Gulf Coast in 2005. Lake City station is located 1,000 feet (300 m) east of a CSX Transportation freight depot.
