= Tallahassee station =

Historic train station in Florida

Tallahassee, FL
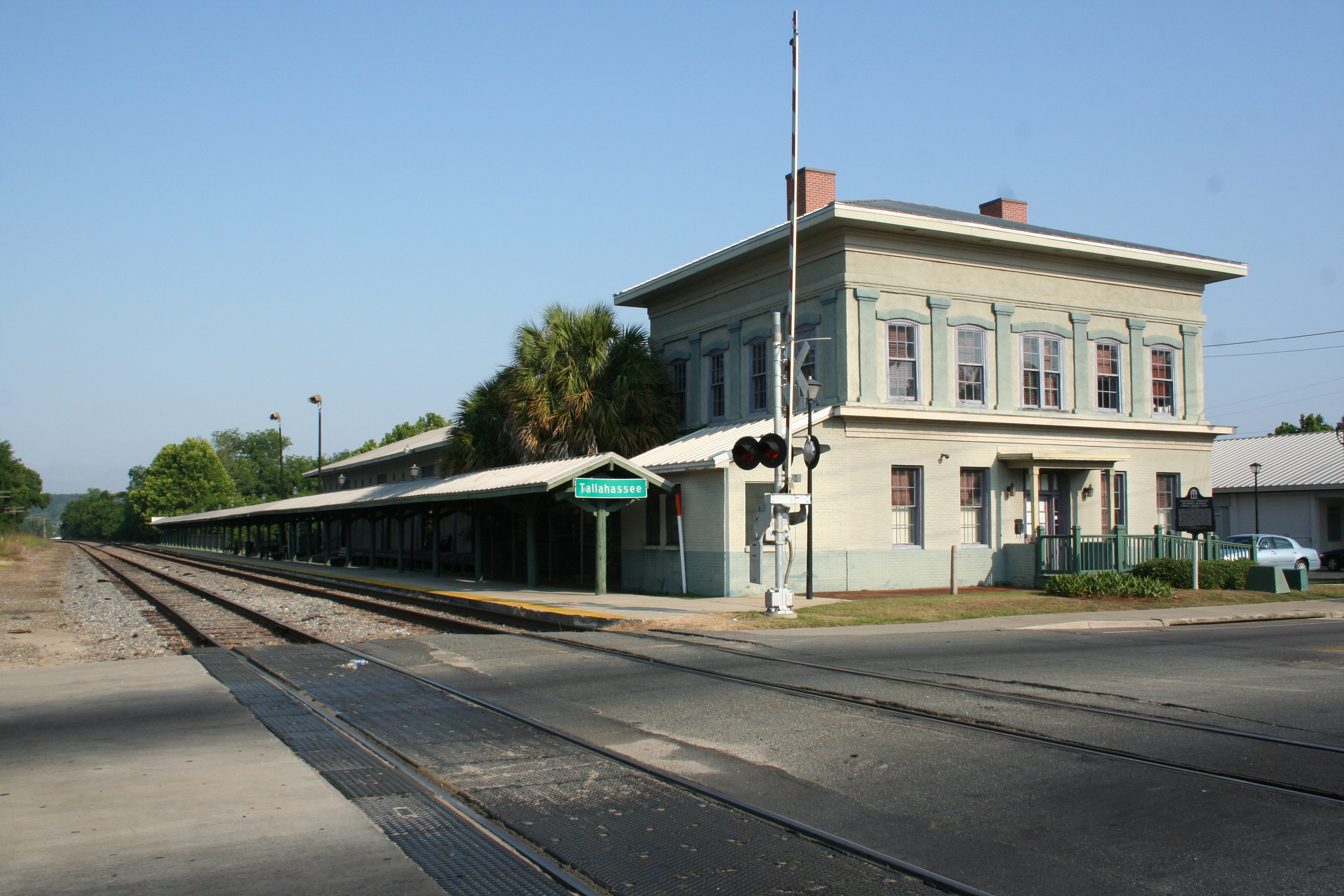
- Southeast view

General information
- Location: 940 Railroad Ave, Tallahassee, Florida

Construction
- Parking: Yes

Other information
- Status: Closed
- Station code: TLH

History
- Opened: 1858; March 31, 1993
- Closed: August 28, 2005 (service suspended)
- Rebuilt: 1885

Former services
Preceding station	Amtrak	Following station
Chipley toward Los Angeles	Sunset Limited (1993–2005)	Madison toward Orlando or Miami
Preceding station	Seaboard Air Line Railroad	Following station
Ocklocknee toward River Junction	Tallahassee Subdivision	Chaires toward Jacksonville
Havana toward Columbus	Columbus-St Marks	Woodville toward St. Marks
- Jacksonville, Pensacola and Mobile Railroad Company Freight Depot
- U.S. National Register of Historic Places
- Location: Tallahassee, Florida, USA
- Coordinates: 30.4337°N 84.2903°W
- Built: 1858
- NRHP reference No.: 97001589
- Added to NRHP: December 30, 1997
Location

Tallahassee station, also known as the Jacksonville, Pensacola and Mobile Railroad Company Freight Depot, is a historic train station in Tallahassee, Florida. It was built in 1858 and was served by various railways until 2005, when Amtrak suspended service due to Hurricane Katrina. It was added to the National Register of Historic Places in 1997.

== History ==
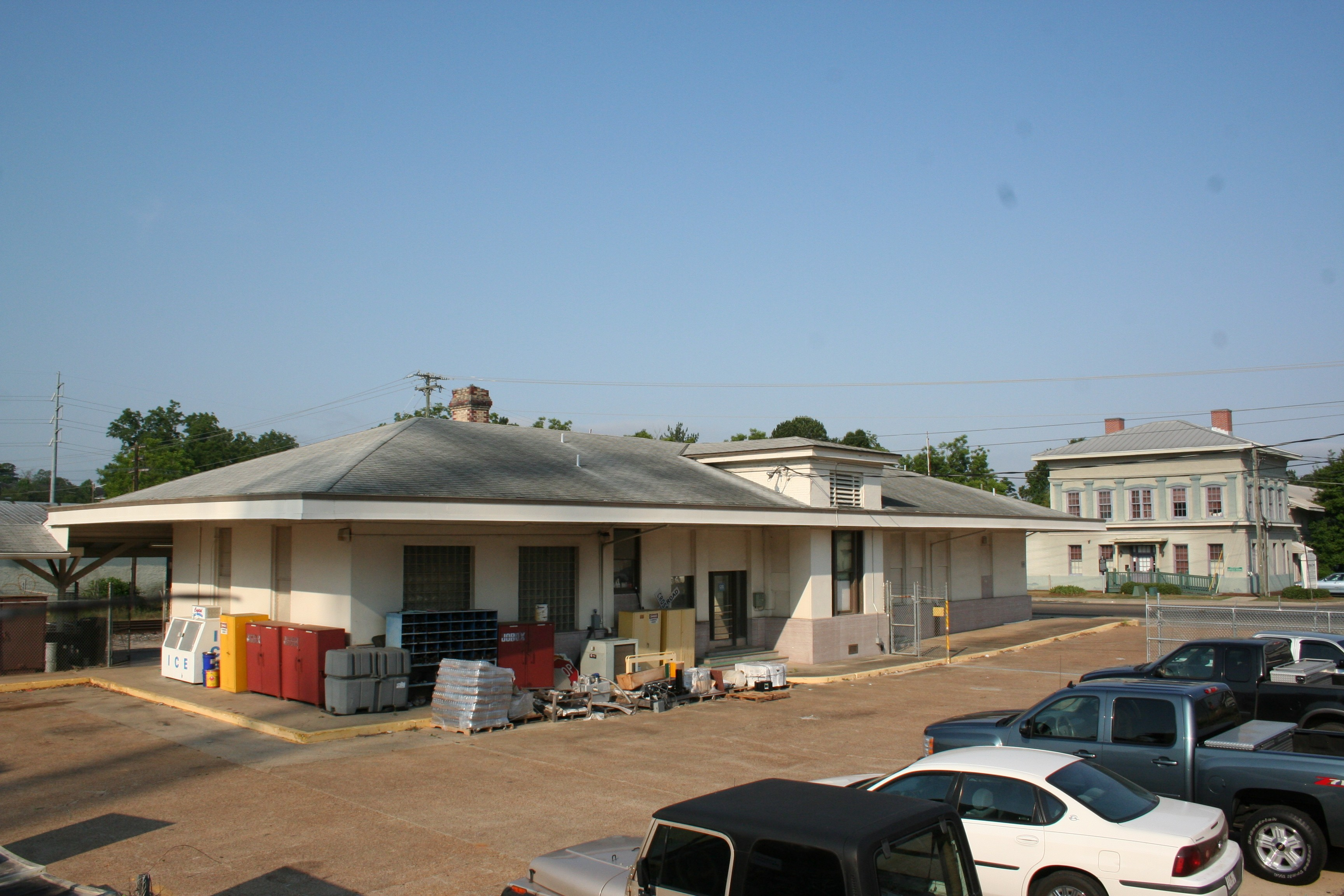
1905 Seaboard passenger station (now CSX Tallahassee operations), with old depot in background

The station is one of the oldest railroad buildings in Florida and is one of only three surviving railroad depots in the state built prior to the start of the American Civil War. It was originally built in 1858 by the Pensacola and Georgia Railroad, which provided freight and passenger service east to Lake City (where there was connecting service to Jacksonville via the Florida, Atlantic and Gulf Central Railroad), west to Quincy, and north to Georgia via the railroad's Live Oak branch. In 1869, during Reconstruction, the newly formed Jacksonville, Pensacola and Mobile Railroad (JP&M) took over freight and passenger service to the depot and extended service further west to Chattahoochee, where the Louisville and Nashville Railroad eventually provided connecting service to Pensacola.

In 1882, Sir Edward Reed purchased the JP&M as well as the Lake City to Jacksonville Florida Central Railroad, both of which he combined into the Florida Central and Western Railroad. Two years later, Reed merged the Florida Central and Western into the Florida Railway and Navigation Company, which added a second story to the depot in 1885. The Florida Railway and Navigation Company reorganized as the Florida Central and Peninsular Railroad (FC&P) in 1888. In 1900, a year after purchasing the majority of FC&P stock, the newly organized Seaboard Air Line Railway (now CSX Transportation) leased the FC&P and, in 1903, acquired it outright.

In 1905, the Seaboard built a new passenger station across the street and east of the depot. This station remained the site of passenger service to Tallahassee until 1971 when, for the first time in 113 years, passenger service to Tallahassee ceased when Amtrak took over nationwide passenger rail service and discontinued the Gulf Wind, the New Orleans to Jacksonville train that had been serving the station at the time.

Passenger service to Tallahassee resumed in 1993 when Amtrak extended its Sunset Limited service east to Jacksonville from its former terminus in New Orleans. The 1905 passenger station had since been converted to use for the freight-related operations of CSX, the successor to Seaboard, and Amtrak began using the old depot as its Tallahassee passenger station.

However, passenger service was suspended in 2005 after Hurricane Katrina caused significant damage to tracks west of Mobile, Alabama. Although the tracks were repaired in 2006, since then managerial and political obstacles have thus far precluded restoration of passenger service to the depot. However, in 2016 Amtrak said the "Sunset Limited" has been proposed to return in the near future. It nevertheless remains actively signed as an Amtrak station.

On December 30, 1997, the depot was added to the U.S. National Register of Historic Places.

== Gallery ==
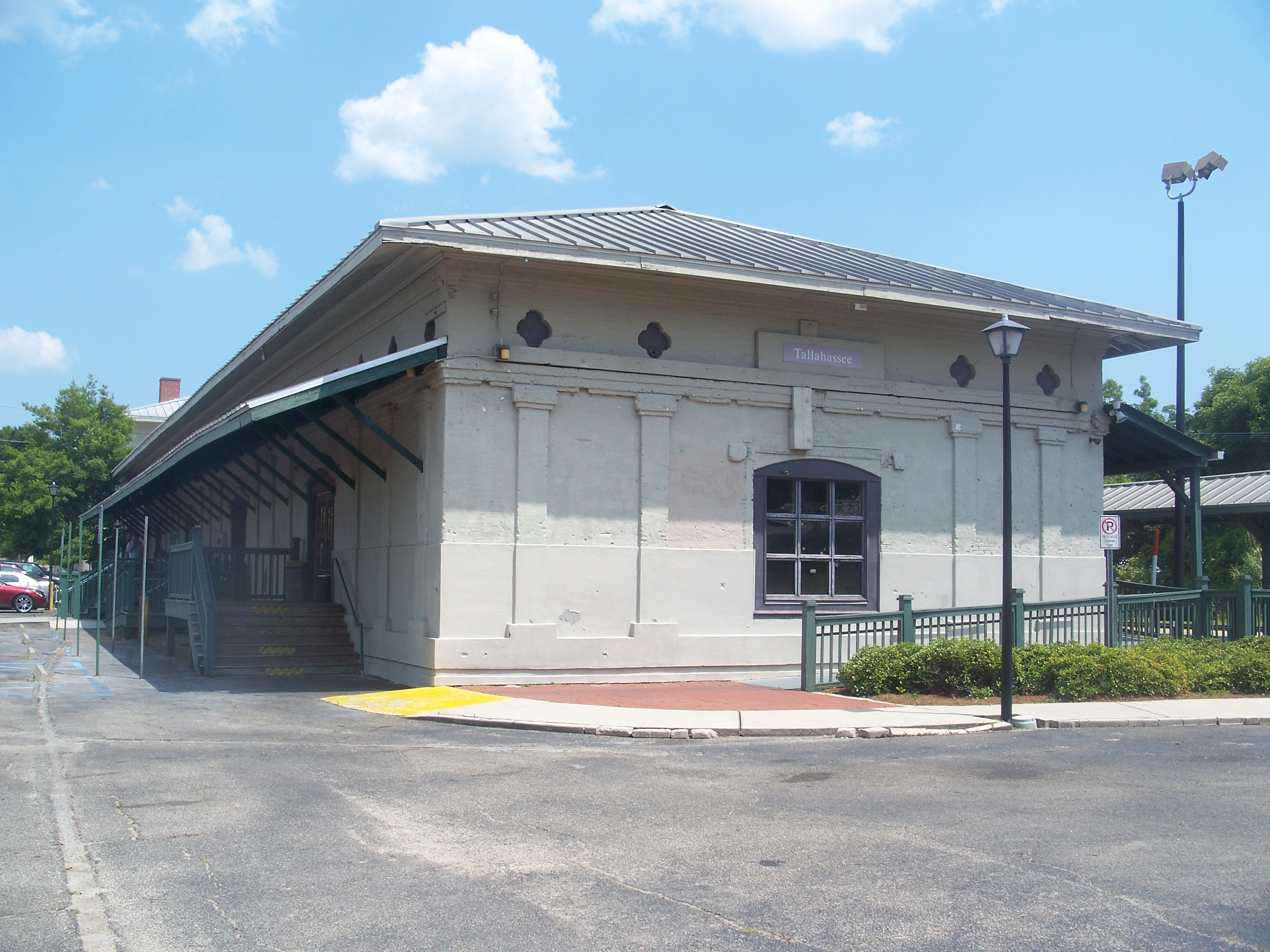
View of west side of depot

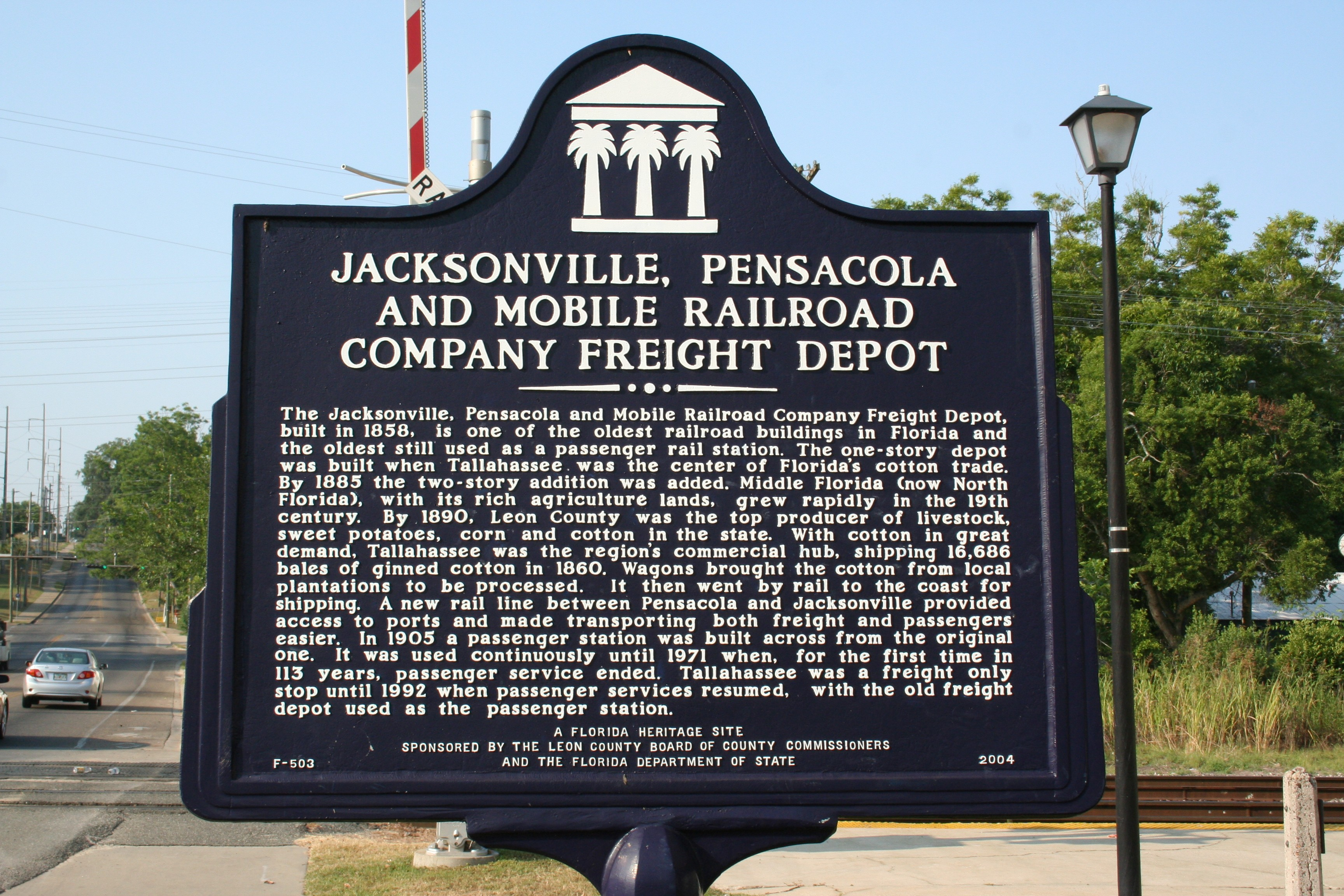
Historical marker at depot

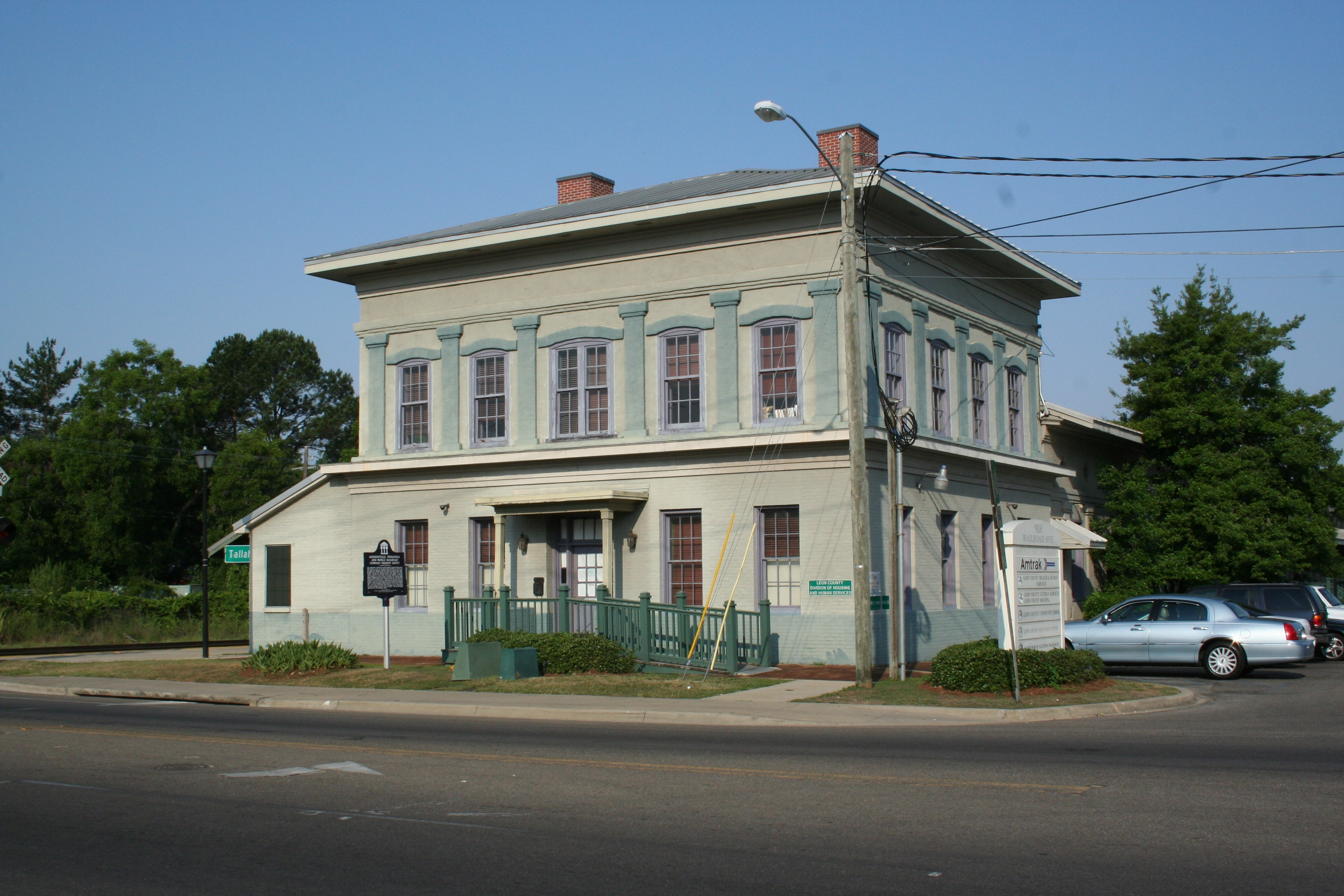
Northeast view of depot

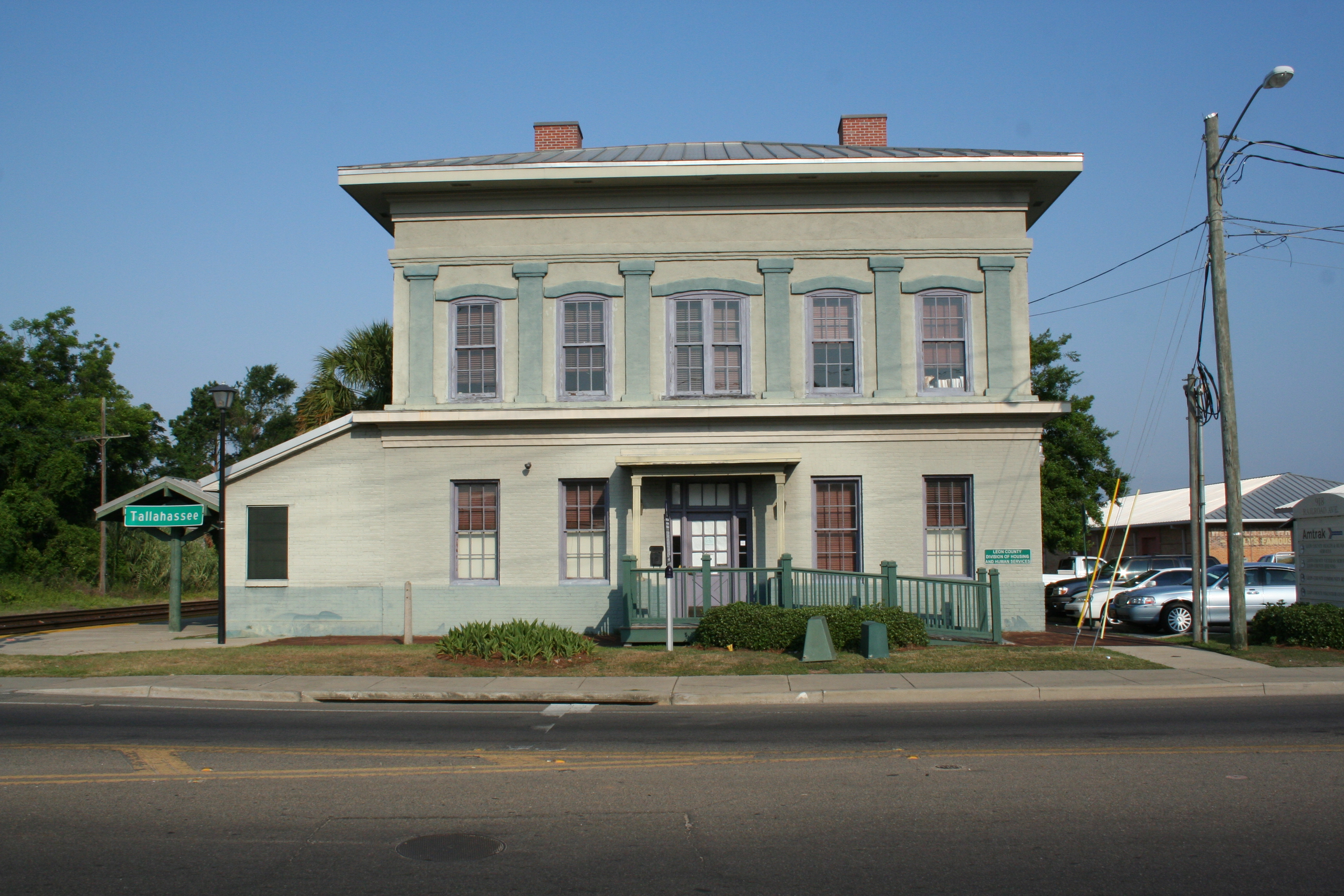
View of west side of depot

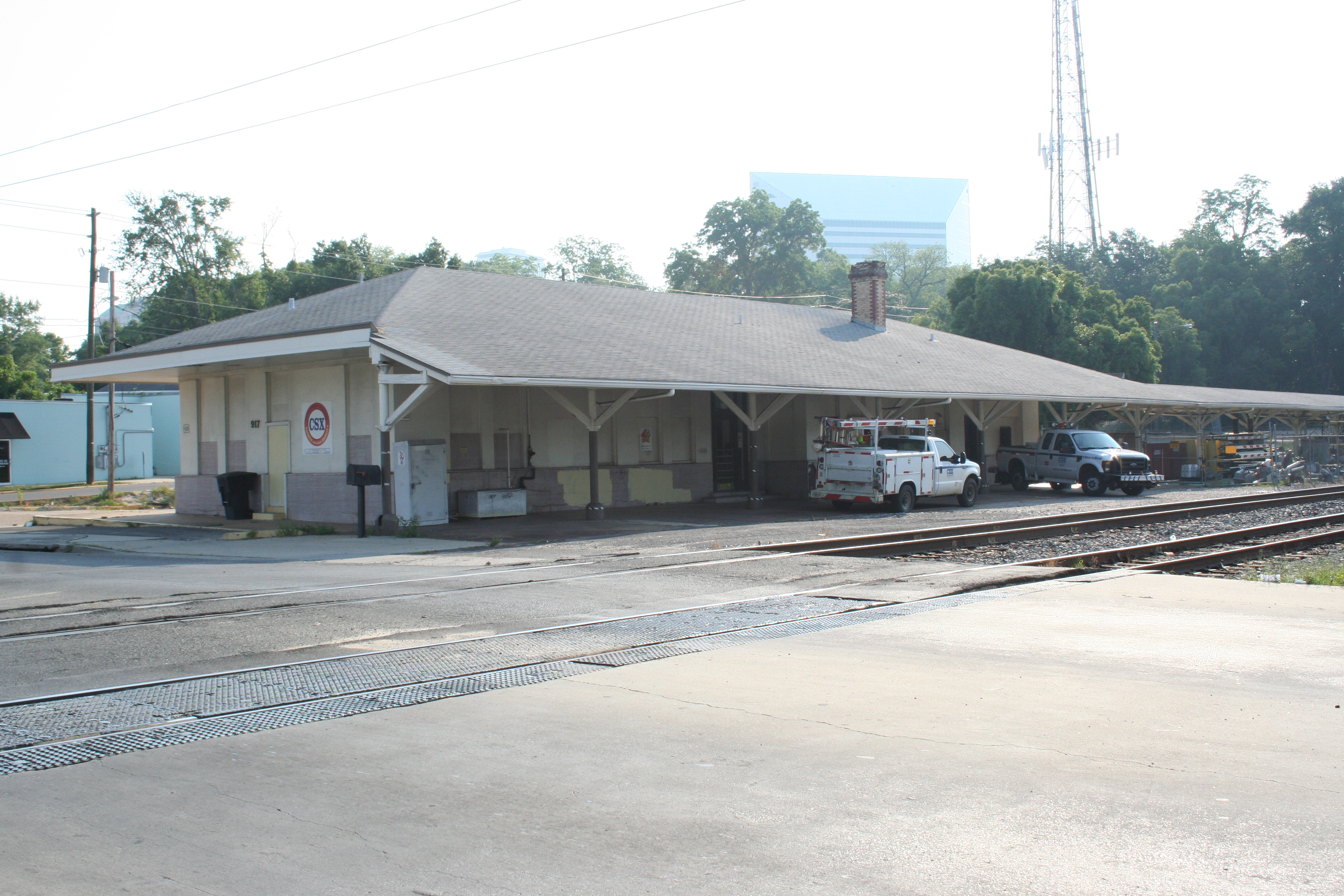
1905 Seaboard station adjacent to depot

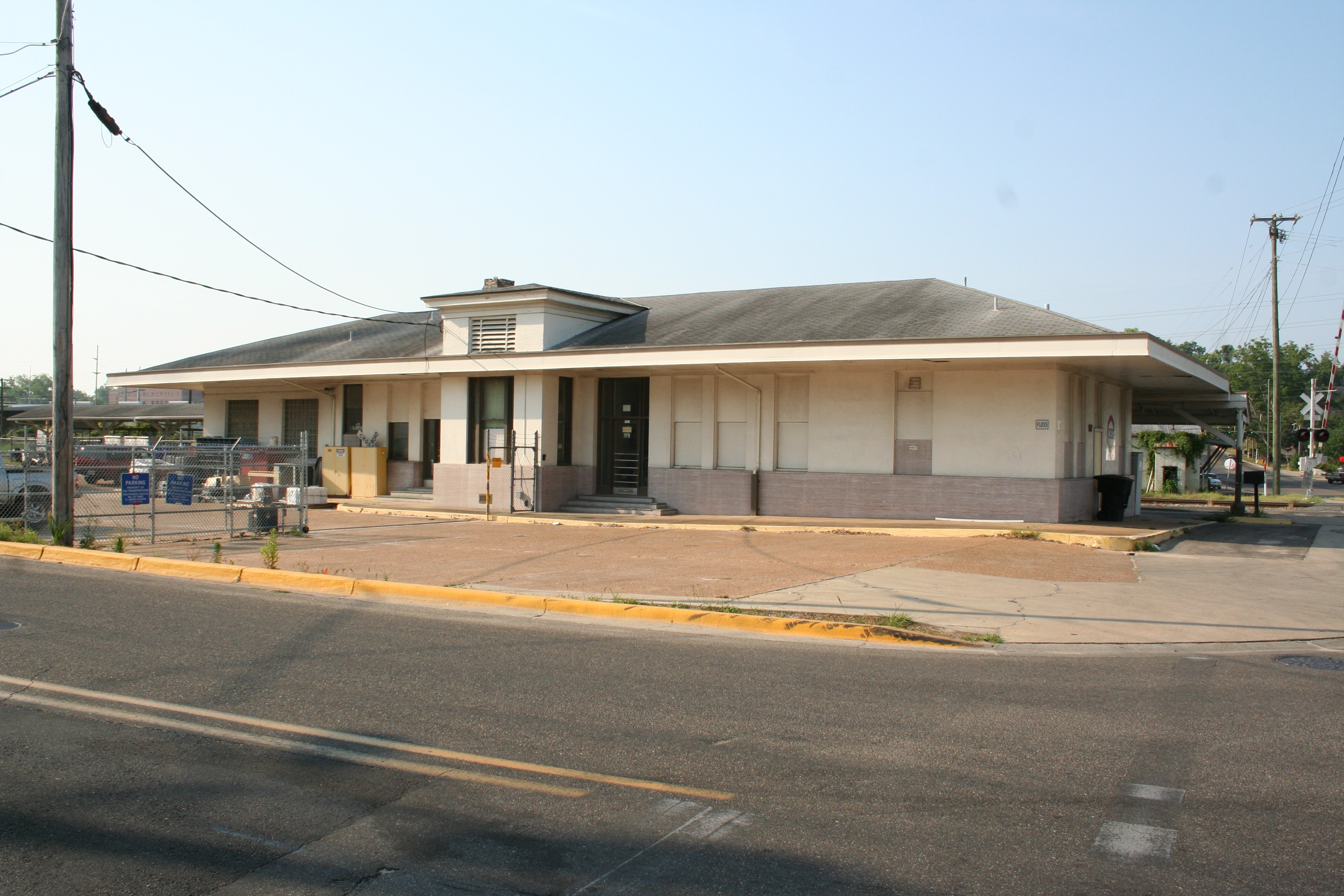
1905 Seaboard station adjacent to depot

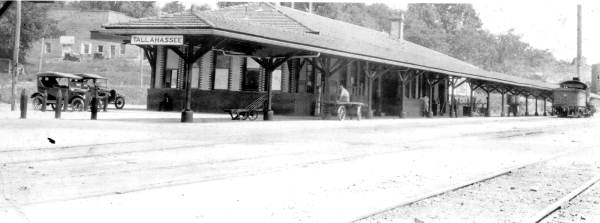
1905 Seaboard station in 1922

== See also ==
- Lloyd Railroad Depot
- Old Gainesville Depot
