= St. Clement's Chapel =

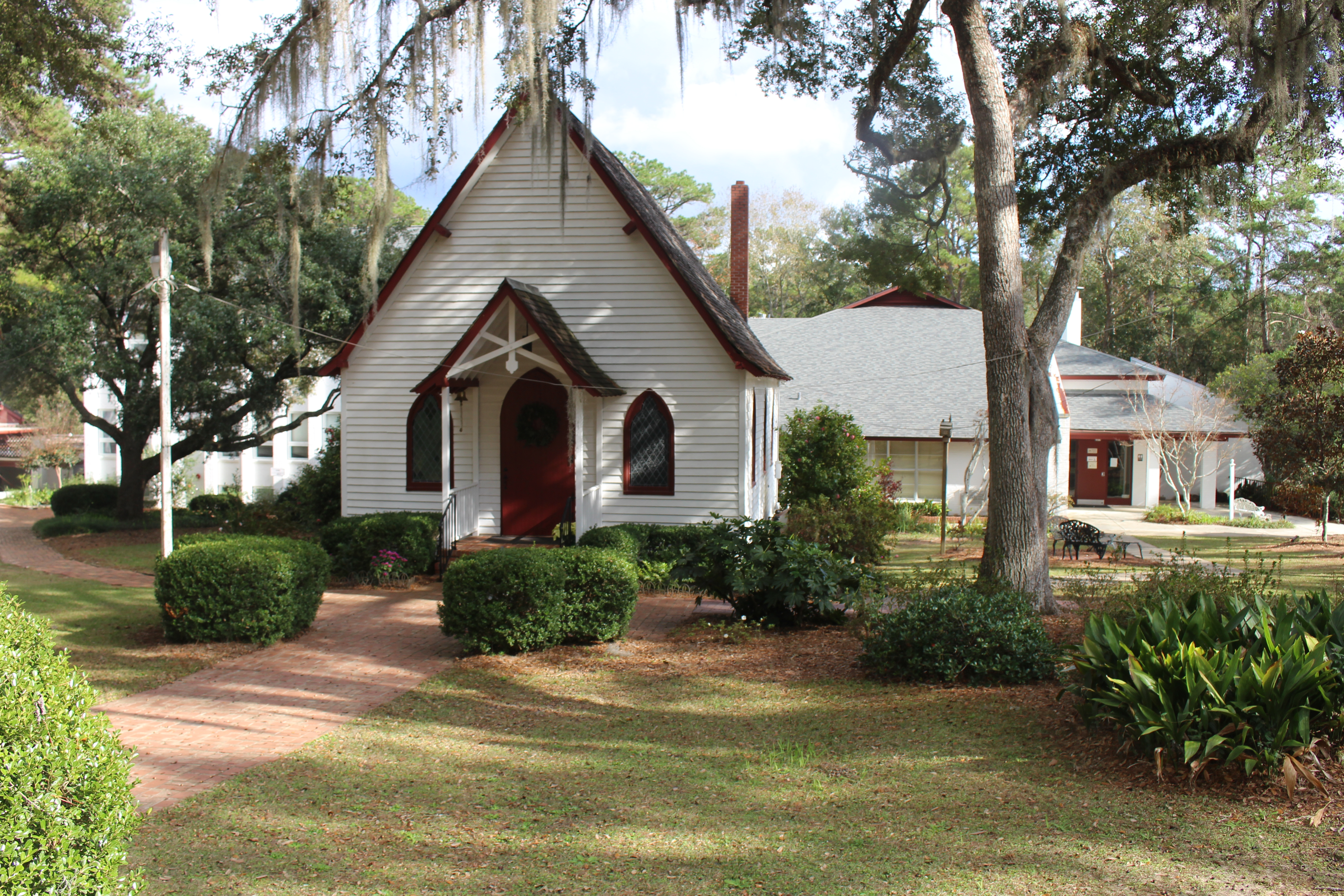
- St. Clement's Chapel at Episcopal Church of the Advent
- Interactive map of the St. Clement's Chapel area

General information
- Architectural style: Carpenter Gothic
- Location: 815 Piedmont Drive, Tallahassee, Florida, United States
- Coordinates: 30.489085°N 84.266016°W
- Construction started: 1890
- Completed: 1890
- Cost: $3,500.00

Technical details
- Structural system: One story wooden frame building

Design and construction
- Architect: William Betton of Tallahassee

St. Clement's Chapel, also known as St. Clement's Chapel of the Church of the Advent, is a historic Carpenter Gothic style Episcopal church building located at 815 Piedmont Drive in Tallahassee, Leon County, Florida. It was designed and built in 1890 by William Betton as St. Clement's Episcopal Church, 15 miles (24 km) to the east in Lloyd in Jefferson County, and was named for the church of the same name in Manhattan, New York. Dedicated by Bishop Edwin Gardner Weed of the Episcopal Diocese of Florida in 1895, it was a small but active congregation in Lloyd, until dwindling membership and the need for extensive repairs forced its deactivation in November 1958. In June 1959, it was given to the fledgling Church of the Advent in Tallahassee and was moved to its present location that summer and renovated. It was rededicated on Advent Sunday, November 29, 1959. The Church of the Advent used the building as its main place of worship until 1996, when it was replaced by an adjacent, more modern, and larger building. St. Clement's Chapel is still used for the 8:00 A.M. Sunday services as well as for weddings and other events. Unlike many Carpenter Gothic style Episcopal churches in Florida, St. Clement's Chapel has all of its original furnishings.
