= Gainesville station (Florida) =

- Old Gainesville Depot
- U.S. National Register of Historic Places
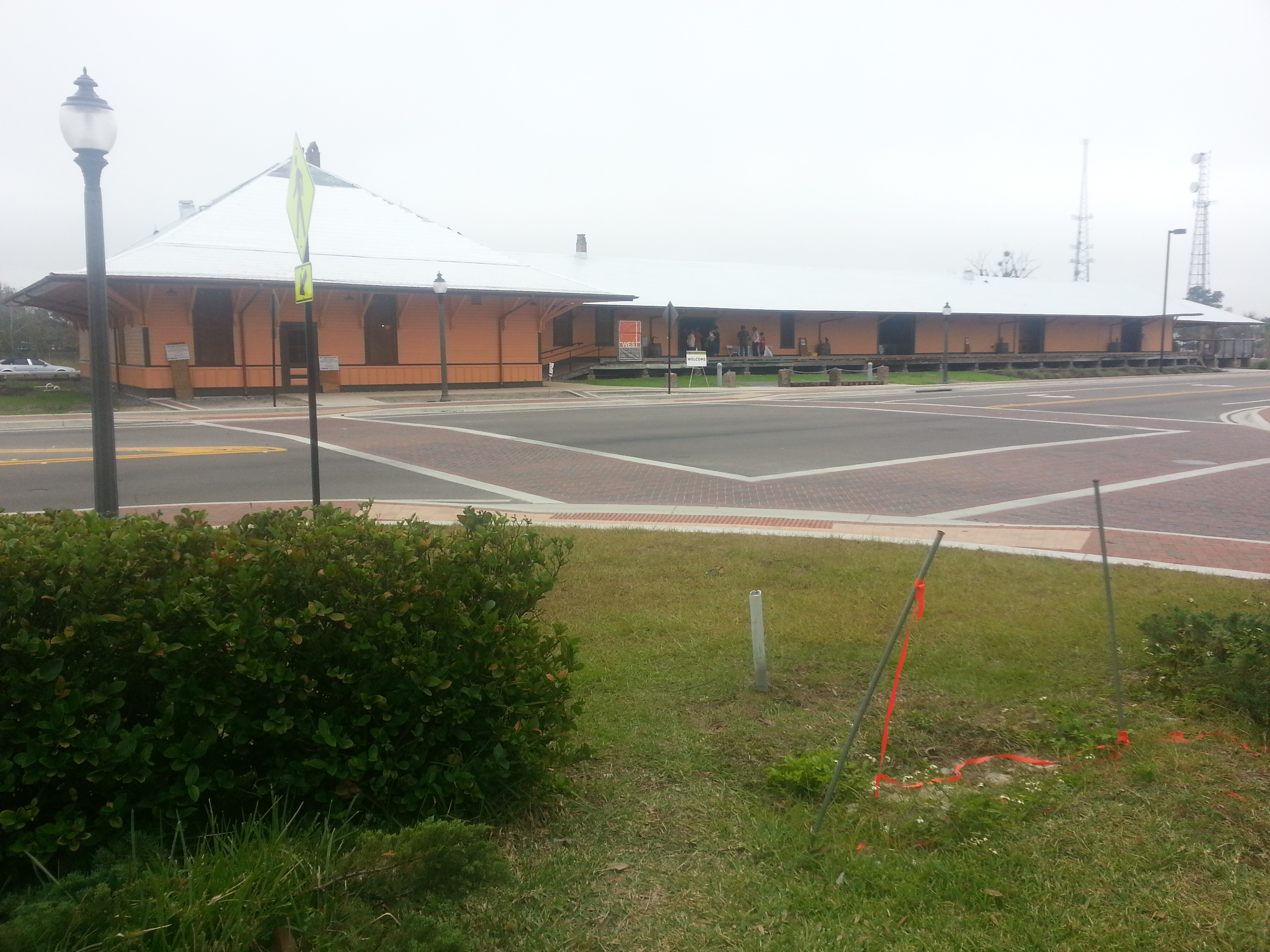
- Gainesville SAL Depot restored in 1910 color scheme. The 1910 passenger depot is on the left. The 1860 freight house is on the right.

- Location within Florida Location within the United States
- Location: Gainesville, Florida
- Coordinates: 29°38′42.7″N 82°19′22.8″W
- Built: 1860; 1910
- NRHP reference No.: 96001369
- Added to NRHP: November 22, 1996

The Old Gainesville Depot (also known as the Seaboard Air Line Depot or Baird Warehouse) is a historic site at 203 Southeast Depot Avenue in Gainesville, Florida. It is located along the Gainesville-Hawthorne Trail State Park.

The station was added to the U.S. National Register of Historic Places on November 22, 1996.

== History ==
=== Early history ===
Part of the Depot was built around 1860 to serve the Florida Railroad, which reached Gainesville from Fernandina in 1859. It is one of only three surviving railroad depots in the state built prior to the start of the American Civil War. The depot was situated with tracks on both sides.

=== Remodeling ===
Between 1892 and 1897, the depot was remodeled to provide two passenger waiting rooms, with one for whites and one for blacks. A new passenger depot with segregated waiting rooms was built in 1910, and the old depot was moved and attached as a freight house to the passenger depot.

=== Discontinuation ===
Between 1932 and 1938, the Seaboard Air Line ceased running its passenger trains through the station, including a line that ran from Waldo to Tampa via the Gainesville station.

Depot operations were moved to a new building where East University Avenue crossed the rail line in January, 1948. By this point, Florida Motor Tours, and later, Greyhound Bus, were providing Jacksonville - Tampa replacement bus service at the station. After the railroad opened the new depot, the old depot building was used by Baird Hardware, Gator Ice and Voyles Appliance store.

=== Acquisition and restoration ===
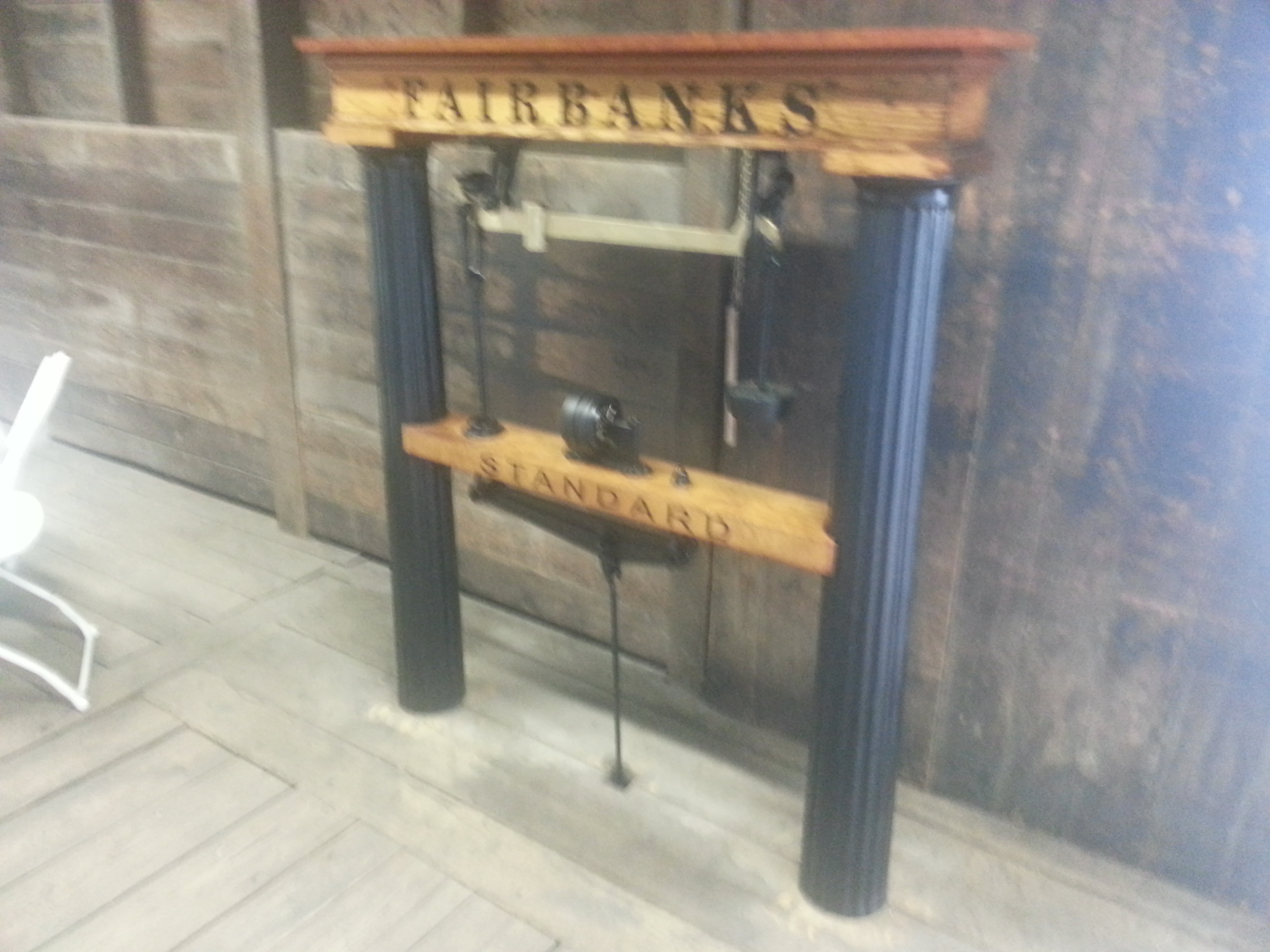
Restored freight scale

The City of Gainesville acquired the depot building in 1999.

The depot has been restored, and painted in the same colors, and with the same style metal roof shingles, used in 1910. The freight scale in the depot has also been restored. The restored depot is part of the Depot Park developed by the City of Gainesville which opened in August 2016.

== See also ==
- Lloyd Railroad Depot
- Tallahassee station

Preceding station	Seaboard Air Line Railroad	Following station
Kanapaha toward Tampa	Brooksville Subdivision	Nedra toward Waldo
