= Lloyd, Florida =

- Census-designated place
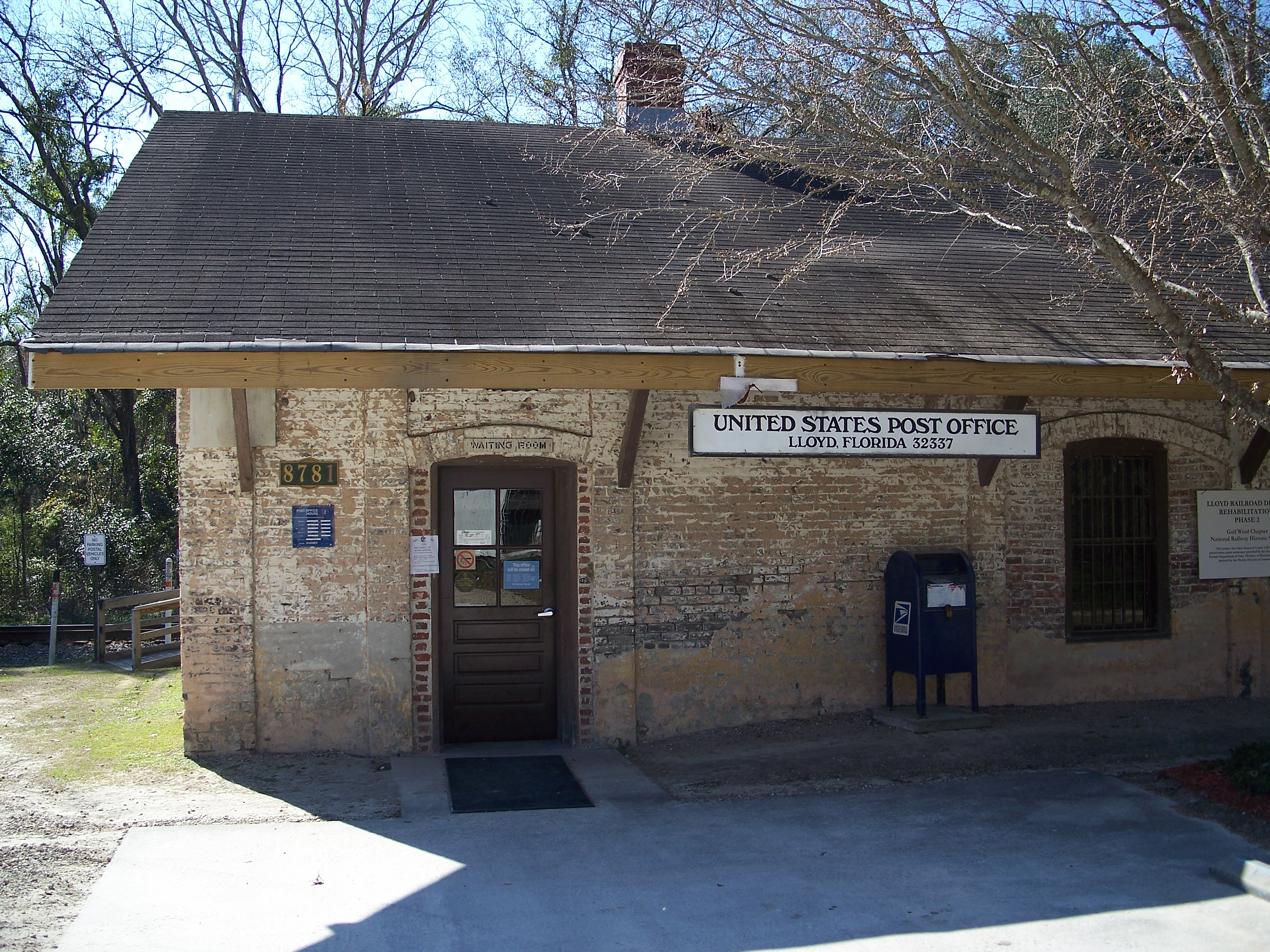
- Old Lloyd Railroad Depot, now the area's post office

- Location within Florida Location within the United States
- Coordinates: 30°28′56″N 84°01′28″W
- Country: United States
- State: Florida
- County: Jefferson

Area
  - Total: 1.52 sq mi (3.93 km^{2})
  - Land: 1.51 sq mi (3.92 km^{2})
  - Water: 0 sq mi (0.00 km^{2})
- Elevation: 89 ft (27 m)

Population (2020)
  - Total: 187
  - Density: 123.4/sq mi (47.65/km^{2})
- Time zone: UTC-5 (Eastern (EST))
  - Summer (DST): UTC-4 (EDT)
- ZIP code: 32337
- Area code: 850
- FIPS code: 12-40950
- GNIS feature ID: 2628526

Lloyd is a small unincorporated community and census-designated place (CDP) in Jefferson County, Florida, United States. As of the 2020 census, the population was 187, down from 215 at the 2010 census. It is part of the Tallahassee metropolitan area.

== Geography ==
Lloyd is in western Jefferson County, bordered on its western side by Leon County. Interstate 10 forms the northern edge of the community and provides access from Exit 217. I-10 leads east 90 miles (140 km) to Lake City and west 17 miles (27 km) to Tallahassee, the state capital.

According to the U.S. Census Bureau, the Lloyd CDP has a total area of 1.51 square miles (3.92 km^{2}), of which 0.3 acres (1,271 m^{2}), or 0.03%, are water.

== Demographics ==
Historical population
Census	Pop.	Note	%±
2010	215		—
2020	187		−13.0%
U.S. Decennial Census; 1990 2000

Lloyd was first listed as a census designated place in the 2010 U.S. census.

=== 2020 census ===
Lloyd CDP, Florida – Racial and ethnic composition Note: the US Census treats Hispanic/Latino as an ethnic category. This table excludes Latinos from the racial categories and assigns them to a separate category. Hispanics/Latinos may be of any race.
Race / Ethnicity (NH = Non-Hispanic)	Pop 2010	Pop 2020	% 2010	% 2020
White alone (NH)	91	77	42.33%	41.18%
Black or African American alone (NH)	112	101	52.09%	54.01%
Native American or Alaska Native alone (NH)	1	0	0.47%	0.00%
Asian alone (NH)	0	0	0.00%	0.00%
Pacific Islander alone (NH)	0	0	0.00%	0.00%
Some Other Race alone (NH)	0	1	0.00%	0.53%
Mixed Race/Multi-Racial (NH)	4	0	1.86%	0.00%
Hispanic or Latino (any race)	7	8	3.26%	4.28%
Total	215	187	100.00%	100.00%

== Historic places ==
- Lloyd Railroad Depot is now the post office.
- St. Clement's Chapel was built in Lloyd in 1890 as St. Clement's Episcopal Church. It was closed in 1958 and the building moved to Tallahassee.

== Education ==
Jefferson County Schools operates public schools, including Jefferson County Middle / High School.

== Notable person ==
Writer and novelist Mary Edwards Bryan was born in Lloyd circa 1838.
