= Aucilla, Florida =

- Census-designated place
- Location within Florida Location within the United States
- Coordinates: 30°28′45″N 83°45′17″W
- Country: United States
- State: Florida
- County: Jefferson

Area
  - Total: 2.00 sq mi (5.19 km^{2})
  - Land: 2.00 sq mi (5.19 km^{2})
  - Water: 0 sq mi (0.00 km^{2})
- Elevation: 75 ft (23 m)

Population (2020)
  - Total: 103
  - Density: 51.4/sq mi (19.84/km^{2})
- Time zone: UTC-5 (Eastern (EST))
  - Summer (DST): UTC-4 (EDT)
- ZIP code: 32344
- Area code: 850
- FIPS code: 12-02575
- GNIS feature ID: 2628518

Aucilla is an unincorporated community and census-designated place (CDP) in Jefferson County, Florida, United States, located near the intersection of county roads 158 and 257. As of the 2020 census, the population was 103, up from 100 at the 2010 census. It is part of the Tallahassee metropolitan area.

== Geography ==
Aucilla is located in eastern Jefferson County 1.5 miles (2.4 km) south of U.S. Route 90 and 1.8 miles (2.9 km) north of Interstate 10 at that highway's Exit 233. Aucilla is 9 miles (14 km) southeast of Monticello, the Jefferson county seat, via US-90, and 34 miles (55 km) east of Tallahassee, the state capital, via I-10.

According to the U.S. Census Bureau, the Aucilla CDP has an area of 2.0 square miles (5.2 km^{2}), all of it recorded as land.

== Education ==
Jefferson County Schools operates public schools, including Jefferson County Middle / High School.

== Demographics ==
Historical population
Census	Pop.	Note	%±
2010	100		—
2020	103		3.0%
U.S. Decennial Census; 1990 2000

Aucilla was first listed as a census designated place in the 2010 U.S. census.

=== 2020 census ===
Aucilla CDP, Florida – Racial and ethnic composition Note: the US Census treats Hispanic/Latino as an ethnic category. This table excludes Latinos from the racial categories and assigns them to a separate category. Hispanics/Latinos may be of any race.
Race / Ethnicity (NH = Non-Hispanic)	Pop 2010	Pop 2020	% 2010	% 2020
White alone (NH)	58	58	58.00%	56.31%
Black or African American alone (NH)	38	32	38.00%	31.07%
Native American or Alaska Native alone (NH)	1	0	1.00%	0.00%
Asian alone (NH)	0	1	0.00%	0.97%
Pacific Islander alone (NH)	0	0	0.00%	0.00%
Some Other Race alone (NH)	0	1	0.00%	0.97%
Mixed Race/Multi-Racial (NH)	3	9	3.00%	8.74%
Hispanic or Latino (any race)	0	2	0.00%	1.94%
Total	100	103	100.00%	100.00%
