= Gulf Wind =

Railroad service between Florida and Louisiana

Overview
- Service type: Inter-city rail
- Status: Discontinued
- Locale: United States Gulf Coast
- Predecessor: New Orleans-Florida Express
- First service: July 31, 1949
- Last service: April 30, 1971
- Former operators: Louisville and Nashville Railroad/Seaboard Air Line Railroad; Seaboard Coast Line Railroad (1967-1971)

Route
- Termini: Jacksonville, Florida; New Orleans, Louisiana
- Service frequency: Daily
- Train numbers: 38 (SAL), 98 (L&N) eastbound, 39 (SAL), 99 (L&N) westbound

On-board services
- Seating arrangements: Reclining seat coach
- Sleeping arrangements: sections, and double bedrooms
- Catering facilities: dining cars

Technical
- Track gauge: 4 ft 8 1/2 in (1,435 mm)

The Gulf Wind was a streamlined passenger train inaugurated on July 31, 1949, as a joint operation by the Louisville and Nashville Railroad and the Seaboard Air Line Railroad (Seaboard Coast Line after merger with the Atlantic Coast Line on July 1, 1967). The Gulf Wind replaced the heavyweight New Orleans - Florida Express on this routing. The Gulf Wind was a limited stops train and offered amenities such as dining cars and Pullman service. The train left Jacksonville in late afternoon, arriving in New Orleans the next morning, and likewise in the other direction.

Prior to the establishment of the Gulf Wind the New Orleans-Florida Express had a counterpart train, the New Orleans-Florida Limited, which left Jacksonville in the morning. For much of the twentieth century, one or two other passenger trains, numbered but unnamed, also plied this route daily; these were much-slower local trains, stopping at each small town along the route, and were labeled simply as "passenger, mail, and express" in timetables. The Express, contrary to its name, made stops at small towns; while the Gulf Wind made fewer stops, mainly in larger towns and cities.

== Route ==
The train's 617-mile route ran from Jacksonville, Florida via Tallahassee, Chattahoochee, Pensacola, Flomaton, Mobile, and Biloxi to New Orleans. Locomotives were changed at Chattahoochee, where the SAL rails met those of the L&N.

With a schedule designed for passengers changing to or from the Seaboard's Silver Meteor at Jacksonville, the Gulf Wind originally departed both endpoints at 5 p.m. daily for the overnight run across the Florida Panhandle and along the Gulf Coast, arriving in the morning at the other end of the line. The name was likely inspired by the success of another train carried partly over L&N rails, the Chicago-Miami South Wind.

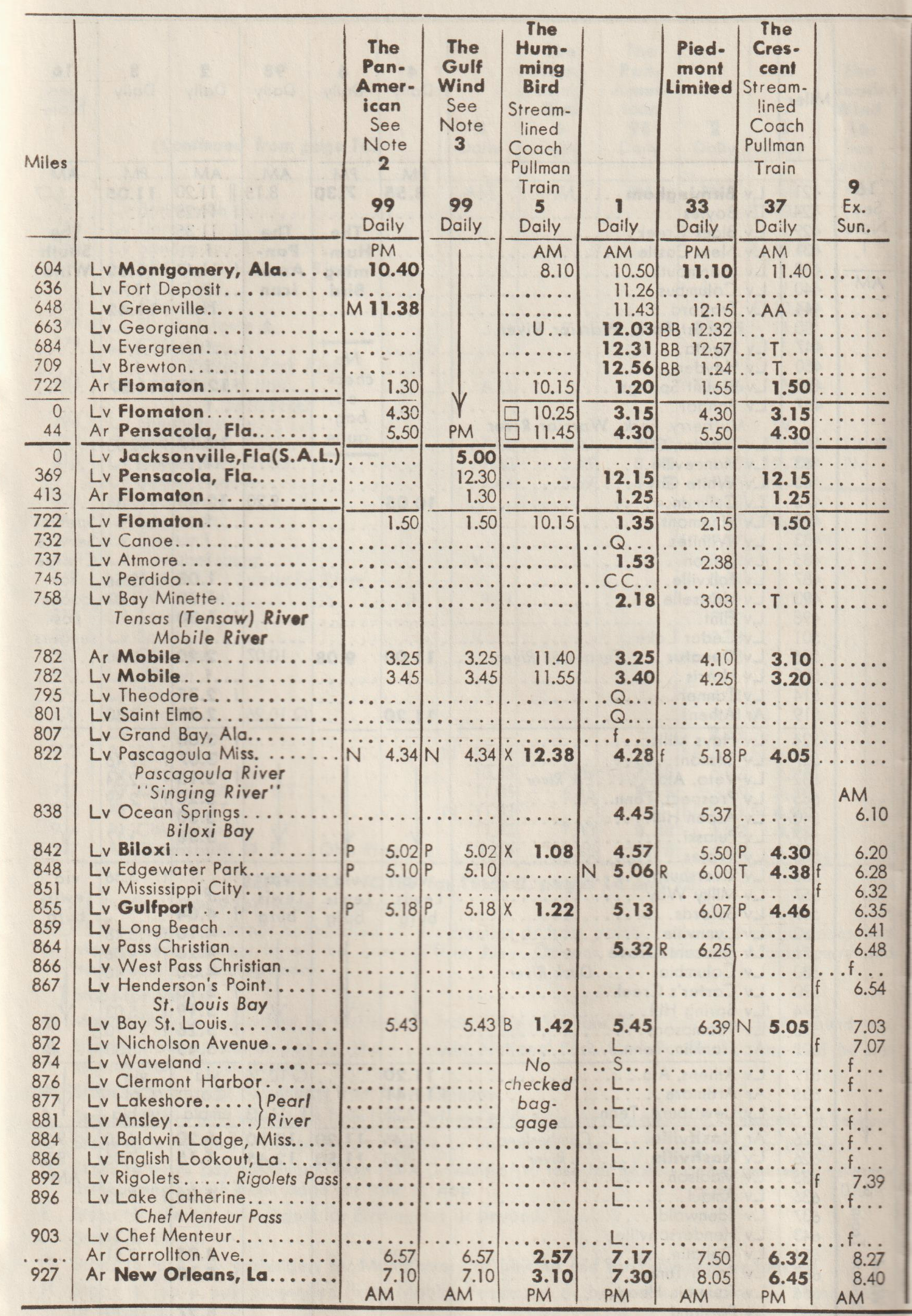
Louisville & Nashville 1954 timetable, showing Gulf Wind running in tandem with the Pan-American, as one of five trains traveling daily west from Mobile to New Orleans

Heading westbound, the Gulf Wind joined onto Louisville & Nashville's Pan-American at Flomaton, Alabama. On the eastbound trip, the Gulf Wind ran from New Orleans to Flomaton along with the Southern Railway's Piedmont Limited, and at Flomaton departed as its own train. After the Southern Railway discontinued the Piedmont Limited, the Pan-American carried the Gulf Wind in both directions from New Orleans to Flomaton.

== Equipment ==
The consist of the Gulf Wind included baggage cars, coaches, and Pullman sleepers with a mix of rooms and traditional open sections, as well as an L&N diner between New Orleans and Mobile, and an SAL diner between Chattahoochee and Jacksonville. By 1955, modern roomettes were added to the consist. A round-ended observation car was also a regular part of the Gulf Wind consist.

In December 1967, the first winter season of the merged Seaboard Coast Line Railroad, the train was the last, along with the company's Silver Star, to have open section sleepers, along with roomettes and other rooms. By the December 1968 schedule, the L&N and the SCL had dropped sleepers from the Gulf Wind altogether.

== History ==
Passenger service existed on this route from its construction in 1882 by the Pensacola and Atlantic Railroad, at times with three or four daily trains in each direction. In 1949, the L&N and the SAL had a local train that arrived at its destinations in the early evening. This local train had no diner or lounge; besides coaches, it carried just baggage and mail cars. (The local train's predecessor, the New Orleans-Florida Express, had a dining car and sleeping cars.) The local was eliminated in 1966. In the train's final year, from December 1970 to April 1971, the Gulf Wind ran only three days a week.

The last run of the Gulf Wind occurred on April 30, 1971. Amtrak, which took over nearly all passenger train operations in the United States on the following day, elected not to continue running the Gulf Wind, which despite good equipment and service was not a profitable train at that point in time.

The western portion of the Gulf Wind route from Mobile to New Orleans was briefly served by Amtrak's Gulf Coast Limited from 1984 to 1985, and again from 1996 to 1997.

The Gulf Wind route had no scheduled passenger train service between Jacksonville and Flomaton until the revived and extended tri-weekly Sunset Limited was inaugurated by Amtrak in 1993. The service was again suspended in 2005 when Hurricane Katrina did extensive damage to the Gulf Coast. Passenger service had not resumed as of 2016. In 2016 and 2017, Gulf Coast regional officials agitated for restoration of daily train service between New Orleans and Florida.

== See also ==
- Pensacola and Atlantic Railroad - predecessor of the L&N

Other trains using all or part of the Gulf Wind route:

- Gulf Coast Limited - Amtrak train from New Orleans to Mobile, 1984-85 and 1996-97
- Gulf Breeze (train) - Amtrak train from New Orleans to Mobile and Birmingham, 1989-1995
- Sunset Limited - Amtrak extended service of existing train from New Orleans to Sanford, Florida, 1993-2005
- Mardi Gras Service - Amtrak train from New Orleans to Mobile, two round trips daily, begun in August 2025
