= Hacienda (disambiguation) =

A hacienda is an estate in Spain and the former Spanish Empire.

Hacienda, La Hacienda or The Hacienda may also refer to the following:

== Places ==
=== Communities ===
- Hacienda, Sonoma County, California
- Hacienda Business Park, Pleasanton, California
- Hacienda Village, a defunct town in Broward County, Florida
- Hacienda Village, Fort Wayne, Indiana
- La Hacienda Historic District, Phoenix, Arizona, listed on the NRHP in Arizona

=== Buildings ===
- Hacienda (Las Vegas), a demolished hotel and casino on the Las Vegas Strip, in Nevada
- Hacienda Hotel, New Port Richey, Florida
- Hacienda Hotel and Casino (Boulder City), now Hoover Dam Lodge, near Boulder City, Nevada
- The Haçienda, a nightclub in Manchester, England
- The Hacienda (Milpitas Ranchhouse), a hotel in Monterey, California
- La Hacienda (Buffalo Creek, Colorado), listed on the NRHP in Colorado
- Hacienda, a bus rapid transit station on Mexibús Line I in Zumpango, Mexico

== Arts and entertainment ==
- Hacienda (album), by Jeff Lorber Fusion, 2013
- Hacienda, a 1988 memoir by Lisa St Aubin de Terán
- Hacienda, a 2005 board game by Wolfgang Kramer

== Other uses ==
- Hacienda Beer Company, in Wisconsin, U.S.

== See also ==
- Hacienda Brothers, American alternative country band
- Hacienda Na Xamena, a luxury hotel in Ibiza
- Ministry of Finance (Spain) (Ministerio de Hacienda)
