= Patton Village, Texas =

- City
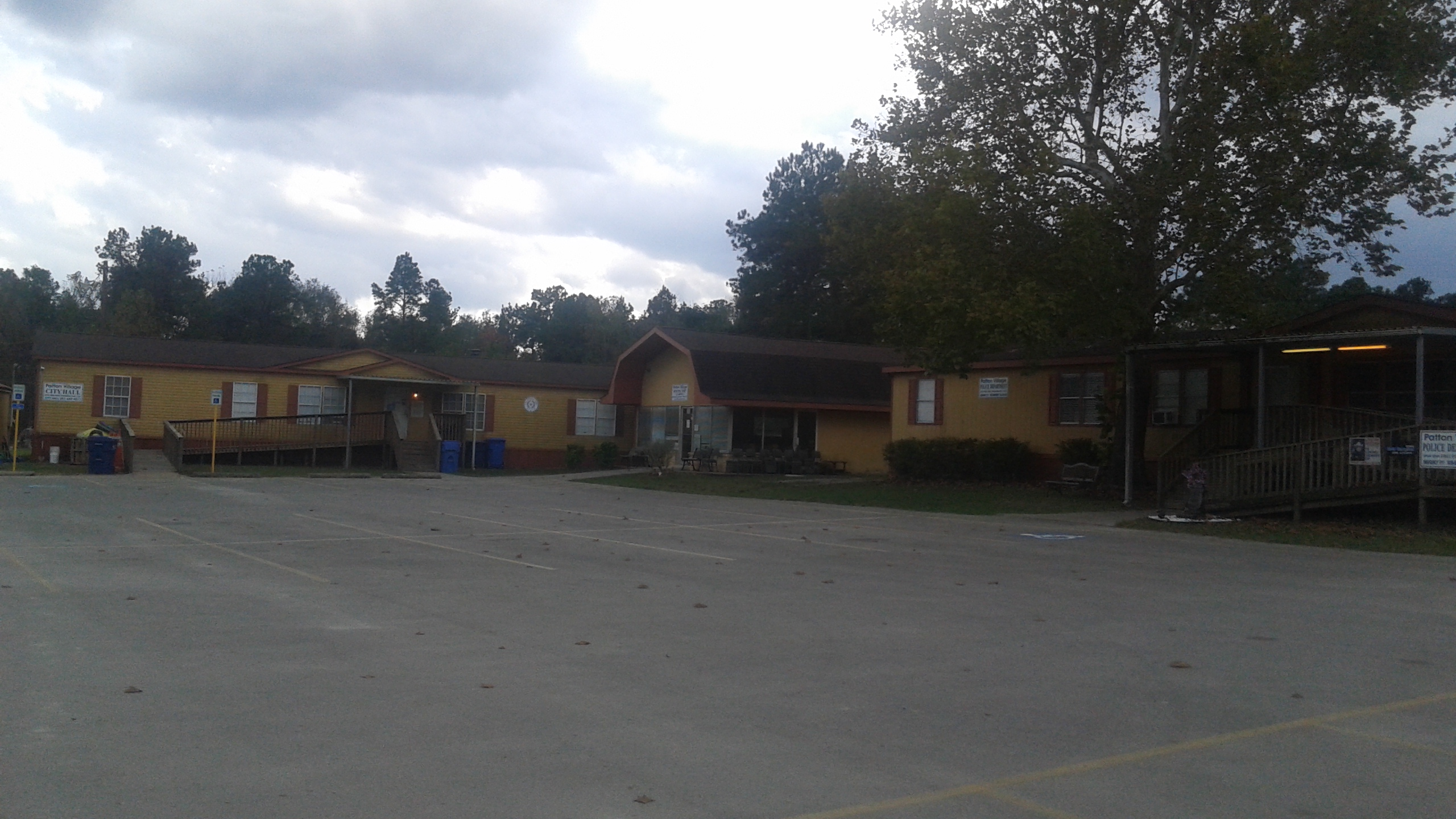
- City offices for Patton Village

- Location of Patton Village, Texas
- Coordinates: 30°11′47″N 95°10′32″W
- Country: United States
- State: Texas
- County: Montgomery
- Incorporated: 1966

Government
  - Type: Type A General Law
  - Mayor: Scott Anderson
  - City Council: Dyane Anderson; Garry Hershman (Mayor Pro Tem); Billy Crittenden; David Gilliam; Barbara Earhart

Area
  - Total: 2.41 sq mi (6.24 km^{2})
  - Land: 2.27 sq mi (5.88 km^{2})
  - Water: 0.14 sq mi (0.35 km^{2})
- Elevation: 89 ft (27 m)

Population (2020)
  - Total: 1,647
  - Density: 949.4/sq mi (366.58/km^{2})
- Time zone: UTC-6 (Central (CST))
  - Summer (DST): UTC-5 (CDT)
- FIPS code: 48-56156
- GNIS feature ID: 1388598
- Website: www.pattonvillage.us

Patton Village is a city in Montgomery County, Texas, United States. The population was 1,647 at the 2020 census. It is located in Greater Houston.

== History ==
A man named H. L. Patton founded the community. Patton Village was developed, beginning in the 1960s. Patton remained in control of Patton Village during its development and its incorporation as a municipality in 1966.

By 1970, Patton Village reported that it had 667 people. The population steadily increased over the following three decades. Patton Village became a bedroom community for Houston. In the late 1970s, H. L. Patton lost control of the development, due to age. Bruce Nichols of The Dallas Morning News said that "Several people familiar with the town said troubles began in Patton Village after founding father H.L. Patton [...] lost control."

In 1985, the city instituted a small property tax. In 1986, after most residents refused to pay the tax, the city repealed it. In 1988, Robert "Bob" Devaney, the mayor of Patton Village, said "Property values are zero. Nobody wants to buy here." H. L. Patton died at age 100 in February 1989.

In 1989, Bruce Nichols of The Dallas Morning News said that the community "may be the most squabble-prone small town in Texas. Council meetings regularly become shouting matches. Officials frequently resign or are impeached." Nichols pointed to the firing and rehiring of police chief Bruce Nichols and to a town judge, who later was forced to leave his post, who pleaded no contest to clearing a woman's speeding ticket in exchange for solicited sex. In 1988 state prosecutors indicted 76-year-old Floyd Duval, the municipal court judge, for official oppression after soliciting sex from a 21-year-old woman from Splendora as compensation for a traffic ticket fine. Three weeks before Thursday May 26, 1988, the Texas Commission on Judicial Conduct suspended Duval's license. On May 24, 1988, 36-year-old Lynn Coleman, a lawyer from New Caney and a former Montgomery County assistant attorney, replaced Duval as the municipal court judge. In 1988, a former mayor of Patton Village had been charged with killing his wife and her male companion.

In 2008, Pamela Munoz became the mayor of Patton Village after the previous mayor died. On Tuesday October 4, 2011, federal investigators raided Munoz's offices at city hall. A search warrant from Montgomery County said that she had used $1,500 municipal funds to rent large dumpsters that were used at her and her mother's houses. Munoz said that the dumpsters had been placed around the city for municipal purposes, and that the investigators were motivated by racism.

On Friday February 24, 2012, Munoz, city secretary Georgia Simons, municipal court clerk Patricia Edmondson, and four municipal police officers were indicted for criminal charges. After a six-month investigation, the Montgomery County District Attorney's office accused them of using police cars, which had been purchased with federal grant money, as collateral to get loans which they used for personal purposes. Due to the arrests, Patton Village city hall closed early that day. After the arrests, the remaining municipal government called for a special session. When city residents found that they were not permitted to address the meeting, many residents walked out before the meeting ended. On Friday, May 10, 2013, Munoz was sentenced to five years in prison.

=== "Speed trap" history ===
At one point Patton Village had established a "speed trap" along what is now Interstate 69/U.S. Highway 59, the main route between Lufkin and Splendora. It became the main source of revenue for the community. The stretch was annexed by the city in 1971. Originally the town was on a two lane road that Steve Weller of the Fort Lauderdale Sun Sentinel said was a "road going nowhere". Therefore, Patton Village did not have much through traffic. The leaders annexed the stretch of US 59, around 1 mile (1.6 km) west of the highway, so it could have through traffic which it could generate revenues from. At one point Patton Village used unmarked police cars with radar equipment in order to catch cars speeding. Bruce Nichols of The Dallas Morning News said in 1988 that the community "is probably best known for its reputation as a speed trap, which Patton Village leaders say they're trying to overcome." When the "speed trap" was active, there were 1,100 citations issued by Patton Village authorities per month.

H. L. Patton had criticized the Patton Village for relying on the speed trap. E. A. Ramsey, the municipal judge, agreed with Patton, saying that the stretch of highway in which the speed trap was located was not in the corporate limits of Patton Village. In December 1981 the Patton Village municipal court refused to prosecute motorists who had been ticketed in that speed trap. This caused severe financial issues in the community; the city did not provide W-2 forms for its municipal employees by the designated deadlines. At one point H. L. Patton had sued the city, accusing then current police chief C. B. "Bud" Watson, former town police chief Johnny Naquin, and former police officer Collier Wright of maliciously and willfully confiscating six of Patton's vehicles; the municipal government had been using those six. On the week of February 6, 1982, H. L. Patton had won his suit, and the jury awarded him $12,700 in actual damages and $30,000 in exemplary damages. H. L. Patton announced that he would be willing to forfeit the winnings from the lawsuit pay to rescue the Patton Village municipality from the shortfall.

In 1987, a newly passed law limited speeding ticket charges from small towns to $20. According to Texas House of Representatives member Keith Valigura, a Republican of Conroe, said that Patton Village police decided to do roadside inspections with every speeding driver so that the police department could bill drivers for other violations.

The newly elected mayor, 66-year-old Robert Devaney, announced on Tuesday May 17, 1988 that he was going to shut down the municipal court that had processed speeding tickets. Ninety percent of Patton Village's revenues had originated from the "speed traps" processed by the court and enforced by the then 20-member Patton Village Police Department. The department had continued to maintain a speed trap along U.S. Route 59. Devaney criticized the community for relying on "speed trap" revenues and said that his community may give amnesty to drivers with speeding tickets and that it may be able to reduce the police budget since it no longer uses the speed trap. Devaney also requested for an audit and an investigation. Devaney and the Patton Village city council members closed the Patton Village marshal's office; that agency served warrants. Devaney said that after the audit was completed, the marshal's office would reopen with fewer staff members.

In 1989, Valigura promoted House Bill 243, which would force municipalities with fewer than 5,000 residents each to only have traffic ticket revenues account for 30% of each municipality budget. Patton Village was in District 16, Valigura's district. In response to the proposed bill, Judy Lennon, the Patton Village mayor, lobbied in an attempt to have the bill blocked. On Wednesday May 10, 1989, the Texas House passed the bill with no opposition. Weller said that " jealous citizens of nearby Humble, Conroe and Cut and Shoot" had pressured Texas state legislators into passing the bill. In response, the police chief, David Broussard, engaged in a hunger strike, supposedly only drinking "...coffee, water and an occasional beer...", for 12 days beginning on May 24, 1989. Broussard hoped to cajole Governor of Texas Bill Clements into vetoing the bill. Lloyd Oliver, the city attorney of Patton Village, threatened to legally challenge Valigura's bill in court and said that it "discriminates against towns under 5,000 population." Ultimately Clements signed the bill into law. The pre-Valigura law 1989 Patton Village budget had a projection of $297,700 in total revenues, with 79%, $236,000, to originate from the municipal court issuing citations. Valigura's law took effect on September 1.

Since then, the Patton Village authorities have tried to remake the community's image. As of June 1989, police officer vehicles had rooftop lights, and police officers no longer hide in underbrush. From January–October 2016, the city handed out 3,404 tickets and citations, totaling $525,000.

== Geography ==
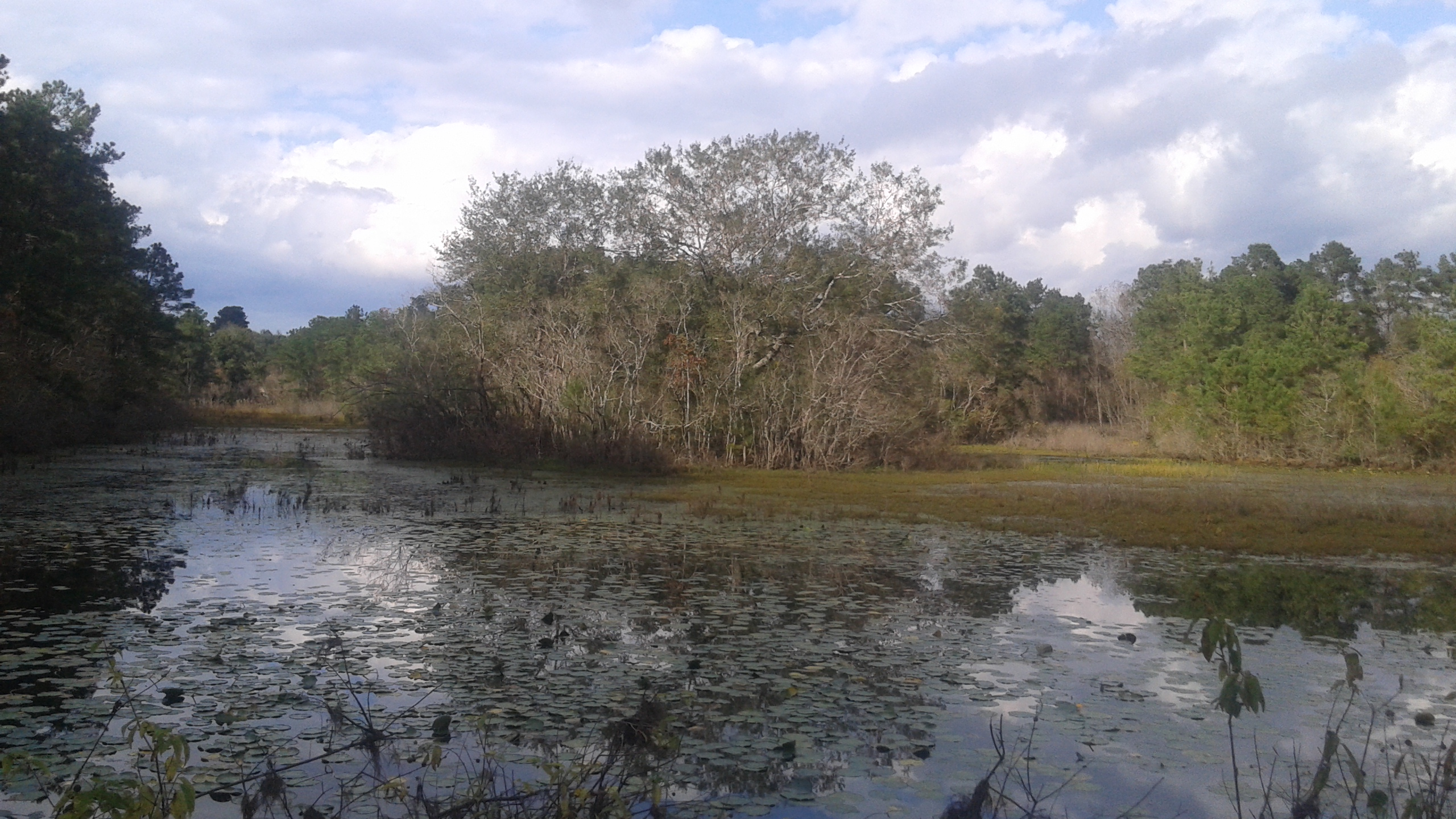
Peach Creek Lake, located in Patton Village.

Patton Village is located at 30°11′47″N 95°10′32″W (30.196414, −95.175422).

According to the United States Census Bureau, the city has a total area of 2.0 square miles (5.2 km^{2}), of which 1.9 square miles (4.9 km^{2}) is land and 0.1 square miles (0.26 km^{2}) (6.83%) is water.

Patton Village is in southeastern Montgomery County, 20 miles (32 km) southeast of Conroe and about 32 miles (51 km) northeast of Downtown Houston. The town is within the Piney Woods region.

== Government and infrastructure ==
As an incorporated city with a population of less than 5000, Patton Village is designated as a general law city under the Constitution of Texas. It is governed at the local level by an elected mayor and five council members.

In the Texas Senate, Patton Village is part of District 4, represented by Republican Brandon Creighton. In the Texas House of Representatives, Patton Village is almost entirely within District 18, represented by Republican Janis Holt. A small section of the city is in District 3, represented by Republican Cecil Bell Jr.

In the United States Senate, Republicans John Cornyn and Ted Cruz represent the entire state of Texas. In the United States House of Representatives, Patton Village is part of District 2, represented by Republican Dan Crenshaw.

Interstate 69/U.S. 59 passes through the far western portion of Patton Village. It connects Patton Village to Houston along its southwest route.

There is no post office within the city limits of Patton Village. The nearest post office is located in Splendora.

== Demographics ==
Historical population
Census	Pop.	Note	%±
1970	667		—
1980	1,050		57.4%
1990	1,155		10.0%
2000	1,391		20.4%
2010	1,557		11.9%
2020	1,647		5.8%
U.S. Decennial Census

=== 2020 census ===
As of the 2020 census, Patton Village had a population of 1,647. The median age was 32.7 years. 31.6% of residents were under the age of 18 and 9.3% of residents were 65 years of age or older. For every 100 females there were 99.6 males, and for every 100 females age 18 and over there were 98.9 males age 18 and over.

98.4% of residents lived in urban areas, while 1.6% lived in rural areas.

There were 523 households in Patton Village, of which 47.0% had children under the age of 18 living in them. Of all households, 54.5% were married-couple households, 16.6% were households with a male householder and no spouse or partner present, and 21.6% were households with a female householder and no spouse or partner present. About 19.5% of all households were made up of individuals and 7.9% had someone living alone who was 65 years of age or older.

There were 596 housing units, of which 12.2% were vacant. The homeowner vacancy rate was 2.2% and the rental vacancy rate was 8.6%.

Racial composition as of the 2020 census
Race	Number	Percent
White	1,018	61.8%
Black or African American	11	0.7%
American Indian and Alaska Native	29	1.8%
Asian	2	0.1%
Native Hawaiian and Other Pacific Islander	0	0.0%
Some other race	328	19.9%
Two or more races	259	15.7%
Hispanic or Latino (of any race)	647	39.3%

=== 2010 census ===
As of the 2010 United States census, there were 1,557 people, 513 households, and 385 families residing in the city. The racial makeup of the city was 83.8% White, 1.0% African American, 1.3% Native American, 0.4% Asian, 0.1% Native Hawaiian & Other Pacific Islander, 11.4% from other races, and 2.0% from two or more races. Hispanic or Latino of any race were 20.7% of the population.

There were 513 households, out of which 37.6% had children under the age of 18 living with them, 51.3% were married couples living together, 14.6% had a female householder with no husband present, and 25.0% were non-families. 20.9% of all households were made up of individuals. The average household size was 3.04 and the average family size was 3.49.

In the city, the population was spread out, with 31.4% under the age of 18, 10.5% from 18 to 24, 28.1% from 25 to 44, 22.8% from 45 to 64, and 7.2% who were 65 years of age or older. The median age was 30.6 years. For every 100 females, there were 97.3 males. For every 100 females age 18 and over, there were 97.4 males.

=== 2015 American Community Survey ===
As of the 2015 American Community Survey, The median income for a household in the city was $40,625, and the median income for a family was $43,158. Males had a median income of $26,571 versus $23,173 for females. The per capita income for the city was $14,786. About 32.3% of families and 32.0% of the population were below the poverty line, including 40.2% of those under age 18 and 15.1% of those age 65 or over.

== Education ==
Patton Village residents are zoned to schools in the Splendora Independent School District. The secondary schools in the district are Splendora Junior High School and Splendora High School.

The Texas Legislature designates Splendora ISD (and therefore Splendora) as a part of Lone Star College (originally the North Harris Montgomery Community College District).

== See also ==
- Speed traps:
  - Coleman, Florida, American Automobile Association (AAA) named it the nation's biggest speed trap city in 1966
  - Hacienda Village, Florida, a former village that was disincorporated in 1984 for their excessive abuse of speed traps and corrupt government
  - Hampton, Florida a town that was almost disincorporated in 2014, in part due to "speed trap" behavior
  - Lawtey, Florida, a city previously known as a speed trap by the American Automobile Association (AAA) before August 2018
  - Ludowici, Georgia, another Deep South municipality that was notorious for speed traps and merchant fraud in the 1950s and 1960s
  - New Rome, Ohio, a former village that was disincorporated in 2004 for speed traps and corrupt government
  - Waldo, Florida, much like Lawtey, it was also a Florida city previously known as a speed trap by the American Automobile Association (AAA) before August 2018
