= Coleman, Florida =

- City
- City of Coleman
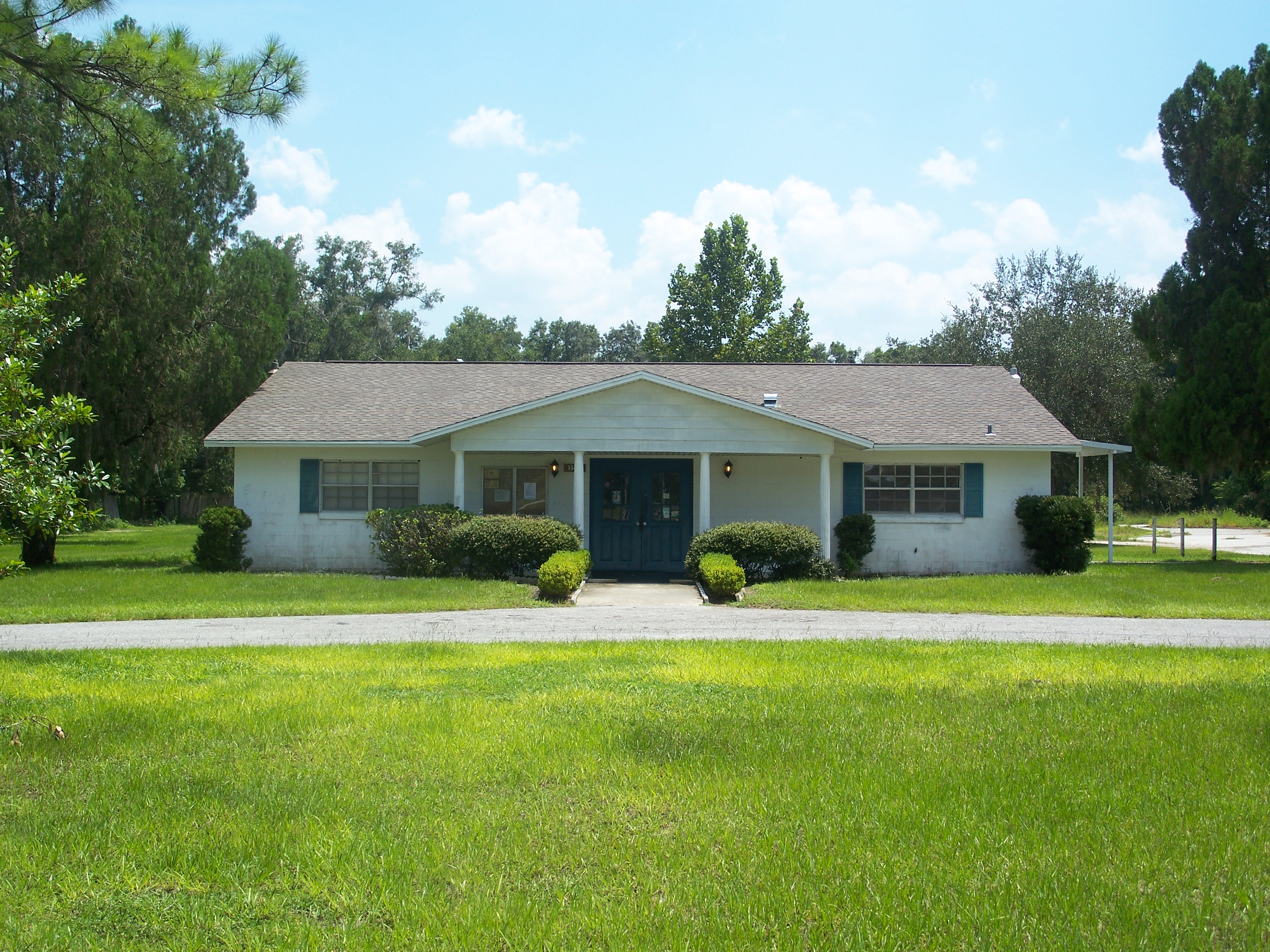
- Coleman City Hall
- Motto(s): “Holding on to the Values of the Past while Moving Progressively into the Future”, "Cabbage Capital of the World"
- Location in Sumter County and the state of Florida
- Coordinates: 28°48′10″N 82°04′15″W
- Country: United States
- State: Florida
- County: Sumter
- Settled (Fort McClure): June 8, 1840
- Settled (Warm Springs): 1853
- Incorporated (Town of Coleman): 1882
- Incorporated (City of Coleman): June 20, 1908
- Reincorporated (City of Coleman): 1925

Government
  - Type: Mayor-Council
  - Mayor: Milton Hill
  - Council President: Charles Felton
  - Councilmembers: Mary Stone, Sonia Shearer, Ke’Marein Williams, and Council Vice President James Sears
  - City Attorney: Brenda H. Smith

Area
  - Total: 2.24 sq mi (5.80 km^{2})
  - Land: 2.24 sq mi (5.80 km^{2})
  - Water: 0 sq mi (0.00 km^{2})
- Elevation: 59 ft (18 m)

Population (2020)
  - Total: 642
  - Density: 286.8/sq mi (110.74/km^{2})
- Time zone: UTC-5 (Eastern (EST))
  - Summer (DST): UTC-4 (EDT)
- ZIP code: 33521
- Area code: 352
- FIPS code: 12-13400
- GNIS feature ID: 2404096
- Website: www.cityofcolemanfl.com

Coleman is a city in Sumter County, Florida, United States. The population was 642 at the 2020 census.

== History ==
=== Second Seminole War ===
On June 8, 1840, Colonel W. J. Worth, Colonel Bennet Riley, and the Second Infantry and Eighth Infantry divisions transferred to Fort McClure to search the Lake Panasoffkee area for Seminole warriors. Three days later, the troops discovered an empty village.

=== Modern town ===
By 1853, the "Fort McClure" community was renamed "Warm Springs".

In 1882, it was officially incorporated as a municipality and renamed the "Town of Coleman" after Dr. B.F. Coleman.

The main industries were citrus, cotton, and cattle, but they also grew celery, cauliflower, cucumbers, lettuce, romaine lettuce, tomatoes, and onions. According to Broward Mill, the past president of the Sumter County Historical Society, Coleman became known for its cabbage production in the early part of the 20th century and by 1923, was called the "cabbage capital of the world".

On June 20, 1908, the "City of Coleman" was incorporated as a municipality. However, it was officially reincorporated and chartered in 1925.

In 1926, the West Palm Beach branch of the Seaboard Air Line began operations in Coleman.

In 1966, the American Automobile Association (AAA) named Coleman the nation's biggest speed trap after the city's only police officer, Chief Ernest H. Barry, began lurking behind a billboard to catch speeding motorists. Barry arrested 369 motorists in just 5 months, all of them from out of town. In response, Governor W. Haydon Burns wrote a letter to Mayor J. F. Crawford, urging them to treat tourists as guests, after which Barry was fired.

In 1992, Southwest Florida Water Management District (SWFWMD) officials approved the purchase of 8.762 acres (3.546 ha) on the northeastern shores of Lake Panasoffkee near Coleman for the purchase of environmental preservation. SWFWMD officials sought to preserve over 300 species and neighboring Lake Panasoffkee. Although some residents applauded the move, others, such as Sumter County Commissioner Jim Allen, felt that the agency would prevent public use of the land.

== Geography ==
According to the United States Census Bureau, the city has a total area of 1.5 square miles (3.9 km^{2}), all land.

The city is in the South Central Florida Ridge section as defined by the United States Department of Agriculture. Most of Coleman's soils are sandy and moderately well drained or somewhat poorly drained. Topsoils are acidic, but subsoils may be alkaline with frequent presence of limestone boulders. A somewhat poorly drained, mildly alkaline, sandy clay loam lies southeast of the built-up area.

=== Climate ===
The climate in this area is characterized by hot, humid summers and generally mild winters. According to the Köppen climate classification, the City of Coleman has a humid subtropical climate zone (Cfa).

== Demographics ==
Historical population
| Census | Pop. | Note | %± |
|---|---|---|---|
| 1910 | 387 | | — |
| 1920 | 640 | | 65.4% |
| 1930 | 786 | | 22.8% |
| 1940 | 764 | | −2.8% |
| 1950 | 849 | | 11.1% |
| 1960 | 921 | | 8.5% |
| 1970 | 614 | | −33.3% |
| 1980 | 1,022 | | 66.4% |
| 1990 | 857 | | −16.1% |
| 2000 | 647 | | −24.5% |
| 2010 | 703 | | 8.7% |
| 2020 | 642 | | −8.7% |
U.S. Decennial Census

=== 2010 and 2020 census ===
Coleman racial composition (Hispanics excluded from racial categories) (NH = Non-Hispanic)
| Race | Pop 2010 | Pop 2020 | % 2010 | % 2020 |
|---|---|---|---|---|
| White (NH) | 396 | 341 | 56.33% | 53.12% |
| Black or African American (NH) | 263 | 213 | 37.41% | 33.18% |
| Native American or Alaska Native (NH) | 6 | 3 | 0.85% | 0.47% |
| Asian (NH) | 4 | 10 | 0.57% | 1.56% |
| Pacific Islander or Native Hawaiian (NH) | 0 | 0 | 0.00% | 0.00% |
| Some other race (NH) | 0 | 2 | 0.00% | 0.31% |
| Two or more races/Multiracial (NH) | 1 | 31 | 0.14% | 4.83% |
| Hispanic or Latino (any race) | 33 | 42 | 4.69% | 6.54% |
| Total | 703 | 642 | | |

As of the 2020 United States census, there were 642 people, 299 households, and 175 families residing in the city.

As of the 2010 United States census, there were 703 people, 261 households, and 144 families residing in the city.

=== 2000 census ===
As of the census of 2000, 647 people, 257 households, and 178 families resided in the city. The population density was 445.0 inhabitants per square mile (171.8/km^{2}). The 301 housing units averaged 207.0 units per square mile (79.9 units/km^{2}). The racial makeup of the city was 60.74% White, 36.17% African American, 0.15% Asian, 0.15% Pacific Islander, 2.16% from other races, and 0.62% from two or more races. Hispanics or Latinos of any race were 2.78% of the population.

Of the 257 households in 2000, 28.4% had children under the age of 18 living with them, 42.4% were married couples living together, 19.8% had a female householder with no husband present, and 30.4% were not families. About 24.9% of all households were made up of individuals, and 13.2% had someone living alone who was 65 years of age or older. The average household size was 2.52 and the average family size was 2.99.

In 2000, in the city, the population was distributed as 26.4% under the age of 18, 5.6% from 18 to 24, 29.1% from 25 to 44, 20.1% from 45 to 64, and 18.9% who were 65 years of age or older. The median age was 40 years. For every 100 females, there were 91.4 males. For every 100 females age 18 and over, there were 89.6 males.

In 2000, the median income for a household in the city was $25,500, and for a family was $27,679. Males had a median income of $27,109 versus $16,429 for females. The per capita income for the city was $12,186. About 19.9% of families and 22.7% of the population were below the poverty line, including 31.3% of those under age 18 and 16.7% of those age 65 or over.

== See also ==
- Speed traps:
  - Hacienda Village, Florida, a former village that was disincorporated in 1984 for their excessive abuse of speed traps and corrupt government
  - Hampton, Florida a town that was almost disincorporated in 2014, in part due to "speed trap" behavior
  - Lawtey, Florida, a city previously known as a speed trap by the American Automobile Association (AAA) before August 2018
  - Ludowici, Georgia, another Deep South municipality that was notorious for speed traps and merchant fraud in the 1950s and 1960s
  - New Rome, Ohio, a former village that was disincorporated in 2004 for speed traps and corrupt government
  - Patton Village, Texas, a city known for its speed trap and government corruption
  - Waldo, Florida, much like Lawtey, it was also a Florida city previously known as a speed trap by the American Automobile Association (AAA) before August 2018
