= Hampton, Florida =

- City
- City of Hampton
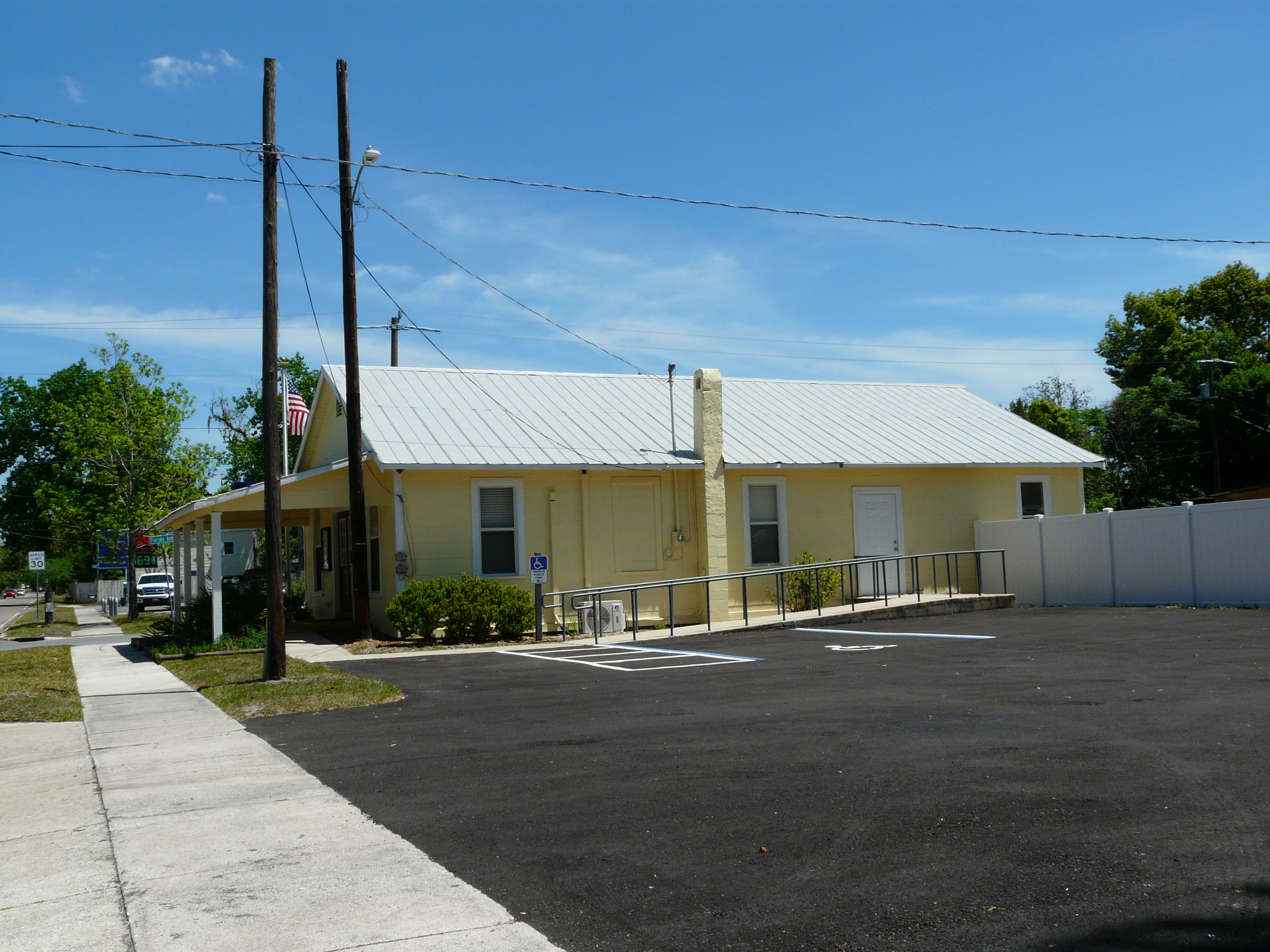
- Hampton City Hall

- Seal

- Location in Bradford County and the state of Florida
- Coordinates: 29°51′51″N 82°08′17″W
- Country: United States
- State: Florida
- County: Bradford
- Settled (Crossroads): 1859
- Incorporated (Town of Crossroads): 1870
- Incorporated (Town of Hampton): 1882
- Reincorporated (Town of Hampton): 1893
- Reincorporated (Town of Hampton): 1911
- Incorporated (City of Hampton): 1925

Government
  - Type: Mayor-Council
  - Mayor: Dale Wiseman
  - Council Chair: William “Bill” Goodge
  - Council Members: Albert Ransom Jr., Lillian Sams, Dorothy "Dot" Shealey, and Vice-Chair; Douglas Williamson
  - City Clerk and City Administrator: Mary Lou Hildreth
  - City Attorney: Will Sexton

Area
  - Total: 1.05 sq mi (2.73 km^{2})
  - Land: 1.05 sq mi (2.73 km^{2})
  - Water: 0 sq mi (0.00 km^{2})
- Elevation: 144 ft (44 m)

Population (2020)
  - Total: 432
  - Density: 410.0/sq mi (158.32/km^{2})
- Time zone: UTC−5 (Eastern (EST))
  - Summer (DST): UTC−4 (EDT)
- ZIP Code: 32044
- Area code: 352
- FIPS code: 12-28575
- GNIS feature ID: 2403791
- Website: hamptonfl.com

Hampton is a city in Bradford County, Florida, United States. It is located in North Florida. The population was 432 at the 2020 census.

== History ==
=== Early history ===
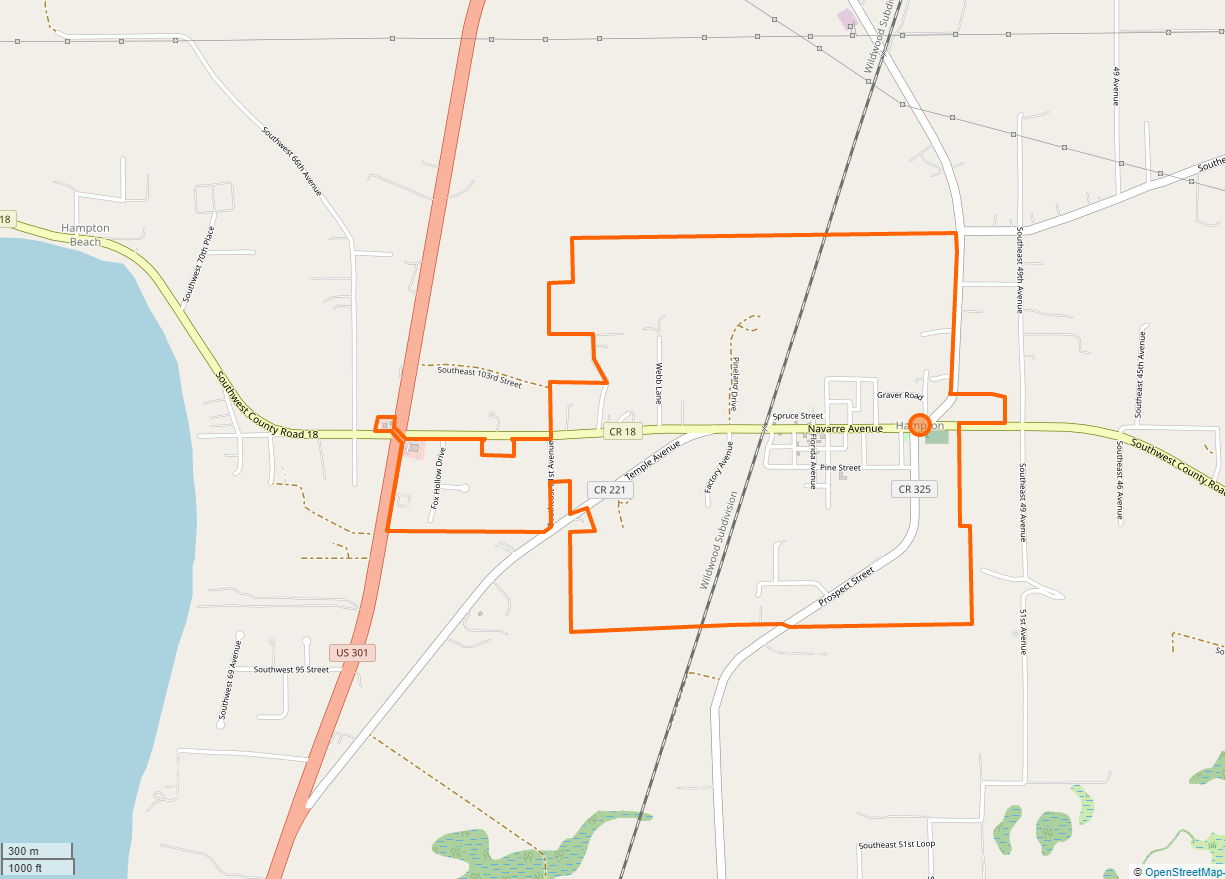
Map of Hampton, showing narrow neck of land in the west, annexed in the 1990s, which connects to the former speed trap

In 1859, Hampton was first settled as a community called "Crossroads", and was officially incorporated as the "Town of Crossroads" in 1870, but later renamed the "Town of Hampton" in 1882. It had to be reincorporated as a municipality twice for allowing its municipal charter to lapse in 1893 and 1911. In 1925, when it became known as the "City of Hampton". At the time, it was at the junction of the Georgia Southern and Florida Railway and the Seaboard Air Line Railroad with stations for both.

In the mid-1990s, Hampton annexed a short stretch of U.S. Highway 301 west of the city in order to obtain revenue from traffic tickets issued to motorists driving on that highway. At the peak of this time, before its police department was dismantled, it had 1 officer per 25 residents.

=== 2013–2014 controversies ===
In November 2013, the city's mayor Barry Layne Moore was arrested for selling oxycodone.

On February 10, 2014, auditors from the Florida Joint Legislative Auditing Committee presented 31 violations of state law, city charter and federal tax requirements to state legislators. The city made $211,328 ticketing people driving its 1,260 feet (380 m) of U.S. Highway 301 during 2012, giving the city an unenviable reputation as a "speed trap". The committee asked State Attorney Bill Cervone to investigate any potential criminal activity and a number of state representatives and senators pursued the dissolution of Hampton. In the wake of the controversy, many city officials resigned. State legislators visited Hampton on March 28, 2014, to see if the issues had been solved. They agreed to let Hampton stay incorporated, because the city retracted the annexation of U.S. Highway 301 and decommissioned its police force. Hampton also accounted for budget shortfalls, and reformed its city council proceedings. In May 2022, the justification for the speed trap was deemed invalid from its inception by Reason magazine, which reported that "Many speed-trap towns defend their aggressive traffic enforcement on ostensible public safety grounds. But Hampton could not even make that sort of claim, since the highway was a mile away."

== Geography ==
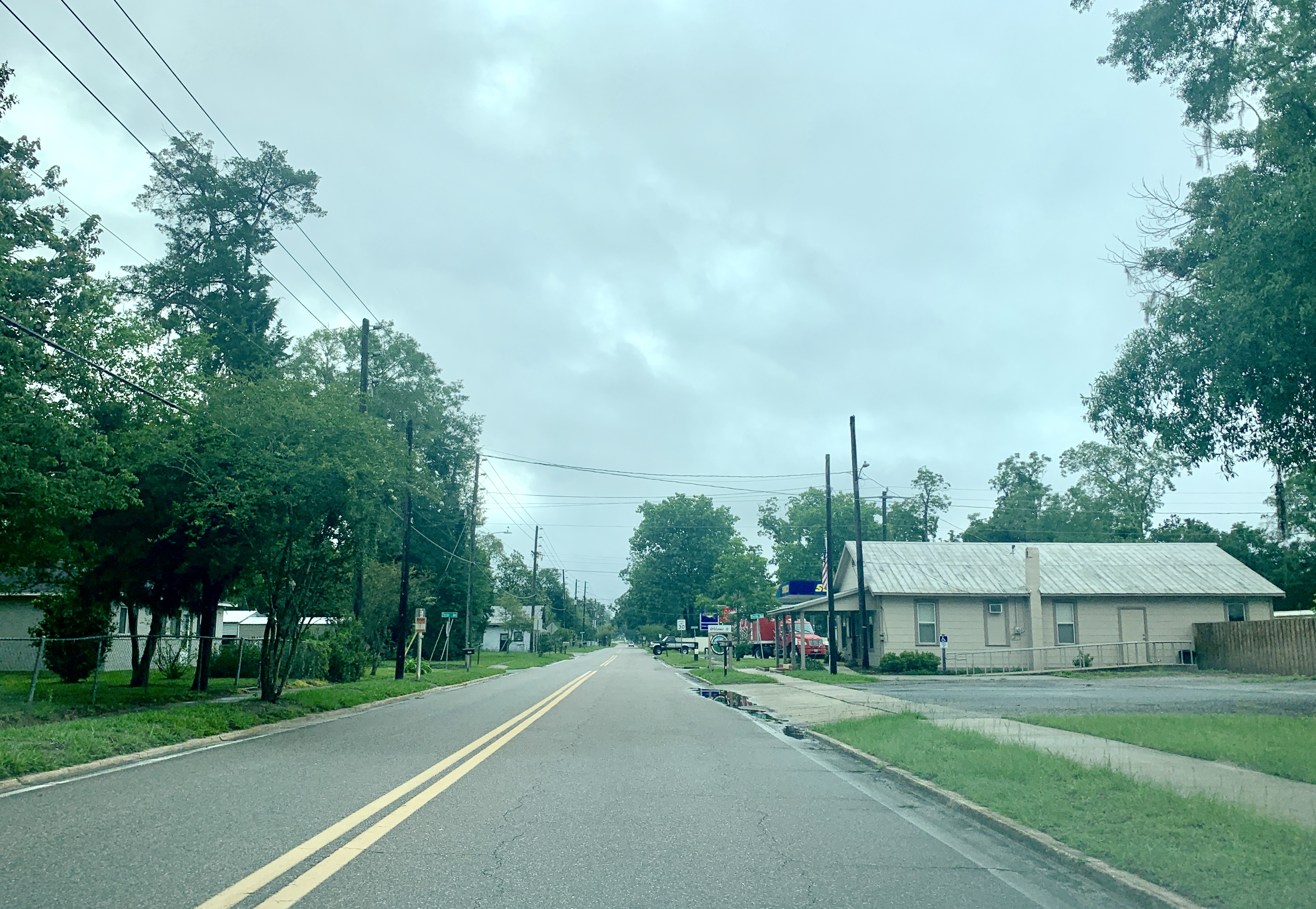
A street view of Hampton's main street, Navarre Avenue

According to the United States Census Bureau, the city has a total area of 1.12 square miles (2.9 km^{2}), all land.

=== Climate ===
The climate in this area is characterized by hot, humid summers and generally mild winters. According to the Köppen climate classification, the City of Hampton has a humid subtropical climate zone (Cfa).

== Demographics ==
Historical population
| Census | Pop. | Note | %± |
|---|---|---|---|
| 1900 | 198 | | — |
| 1910 | 265 | | 33.8% |
| 1920 | 286 | | 7.9% |
| 1930 | 311 | | 8.7% |
| 1940 | 478 | | 53.7% |
| 1950 | 386 | | −19.2% |
| 1960 | 340 | | −11.9% |
| 1970 | 386 | | 13.5% |
| 1980 | 466 | | 20.7% |
| 1990 | 296 | | −36.5% |
| 2000 | 431 | | 45.6% |
| 2010 | 500 | | 16.0% |
| 2020 | 432 | | −13.6% |
U.S. Decennial Census

=== 2010 and 2020 census ===
Hampton racial composition (Hispanics excluded from racial categories) (NH = Non-Hispanic)
| Race | Pop 2010 | Pop 2020 | % 2010 | % 2020 |
|---|---|---|---|---|
| White (NH) | 434 | 380 | 86.80% | 87.96% |
| Black or African American (NH) | 45 | 25 | 9.00% | 5.79% |
| Native American or Alaska Native (NH) | 0 | 0 | 0.00% | 0.00% |
| Asian (NH) | 0 | 1 | 0.00% | 0.23% |
| Pacific Islander or Native Hawaiian (NH) | 0 | 0 | 0.00% | 0.00% |
| Some other race (NH) | 3 | 2 | 0.60% | 0.46% |
| Two or more races/multiracial (NH) | 9 | 8 | 1.80% | 1.85% |
| Hispanic or Latino (any race) | 9 | 16 | 1.80% | 3.70% |
| Total | 500 | 432 | | |

As of the 2020 United States census, there were 432 people, 220 households, and 128 families residing in the city.

As of the 2010 United States census, there were 500 people, 182 households, and 118 families residing in the city.

=== 2000 census ===
As of the census of 2000, there were 431 people, 160 households, and 110 families residing in the city. The population density was 417.0 inhabitants per square mile (161.0/km^{2}). There were 190 housing units at an average density of 183.8 units per square mile (71.0 units/km^{2}). The racial makeup of the city was 87.01% White, 11.14% African American, 0.23% Native American, and 1.62% from two or more races. Hispanic or Latino people of any race were 1.16% of the population.

In 2000, there were 160 households, out of which 37.5% had children under the age of 18 living with them, 48.8% were married couples living together, 15.6% had a female householder with no husband present, and 31.3% were non-families. 27.5% of all households were made up of individuals, and 16.3% had someone living alone who was 65 years of age or older. The average household size was 2.54 and the average family size was 3.07.

In 2000, in the city, the population was spread out, with 26.9% under the age of 18, 10.9% from 18 to 24, 26.0% from 25 to 44, 19.7% from 45 to 64, and 16.5% who were 65 years of age or older. The median age was 37 years. For every 100 females, there were 98.6 males. For every 100 females age 18 and over, there were 93.3 males.

In 2000, the median income for a household in the city was $24,091, and the median income for a family was $29,375. Males had a median income of $23,250 versus $20,000 for females. The per capita income for the city was $14,620. About 20.4% of families and 26.6% of the population were below the poverty line, including 32.8% of those under age 18 and 38.3% of those age 65 or over.

== Education ==
Bradford County School District is the area school district.

Hampton Elementary School is the only public school located within the city limits.

== See also ==
- Speed traps:
  - Coleman, Florida, the American Automobile Association (AAA) named it the nation's biggest speed trap city in 1966
  - Hacienda Village, Florida, a former village that was disincorporated in 1984 for their excessive abuse of speed traps and corrupt government
  - Lawtey, Florida, a city previously known as a speed trap by the American Automobile Association (AAA) before August 2018
  - Ludowici, Georgia, another Deep South municipality that was notorious for speed traps and merchant fraud in the 1950s and 1960s
  - New Rome, Ohio, a former village that was disincorporated in 2004 for speed traps and corrupt government
  - Patton Village, Texas, a city known for its speed trap and government corruption
  - Waldo, Florida, much like Lawtey, it was also a Florida city previously known as a speed trap by the American Automobile Association (AAA) before August 2018
