= 1888 Florida gubernatorial election =

- November 6, 1888
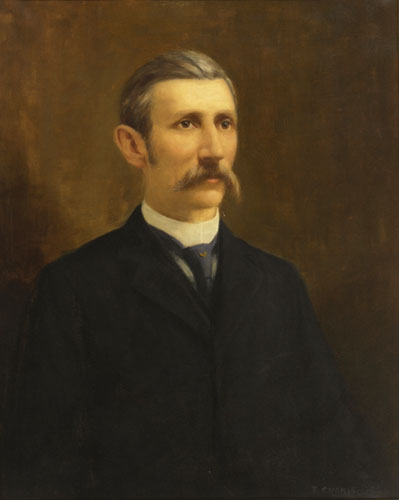

Nominee	Francis P. Fleming	V. J. Shipman
Party	Democratic	Republican
Popular vote	40,195	26,385
Percentage	60.37%	39.63%

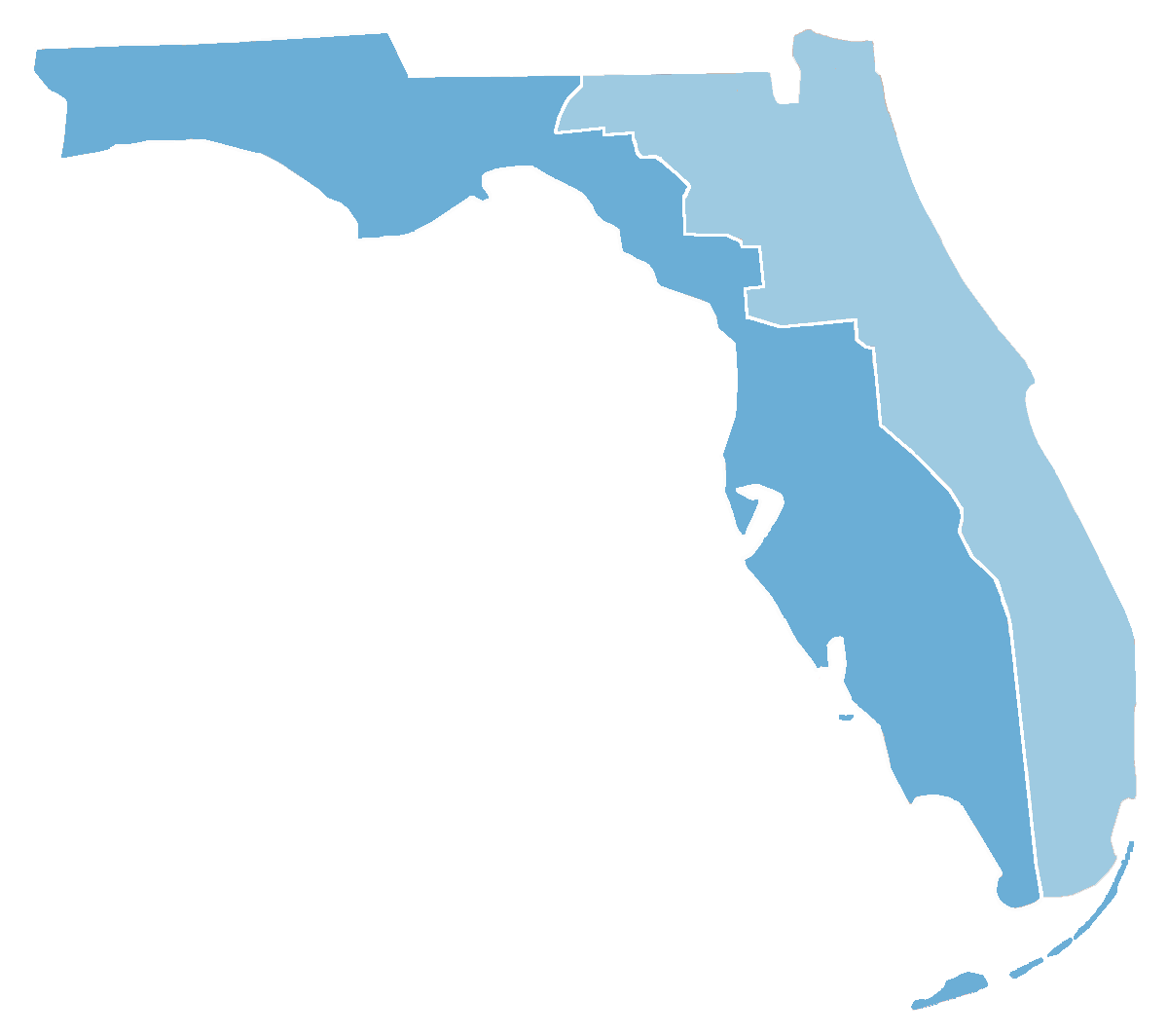
Fleming
50–60%
60–70%
70–80%
80–90%
>90%
Shipman
50–60%
60–70%
Governor before election
Edward A. Perry
Democratic
Elected Governor
Francis P. Fleming
Democratic

The 1888 Florida gubernatorial election was held on November 6, 1888. Democratic nominee Francis P. Fleming defeated Republican nominee V. J. Shipman with 60.37% of the vote.

Republican candidate Volney Job Shipman was a Union Army officer who mustered out due to injury and settled in Iowa before moving to Florida for health considerations. He established the town of Lawtey, Florida and was involved in agricultural pursuits. His fortunes declined due to a great freeze.

== General election ==
=== Candidates ===
- Francis P. Fleming, Democratic
- V. J. Shipman, Republican

=== Results ===
1888 Florida gubernatorial election
Party	Candidate	Votes	%	±%
Democratic	Francis P. Fleming	40,195	60.37%	
Republican	V. J. Shipman	26,385	39.63%	
Majority		13,810		
Turnout				
Democratic hold		Swing		

==== Results by County ====
County	Francis P. Fleming Democratic		V. J. Shipman Republican		Total votes
County	#	%	#	%	Total votes
Alachua	2,043	59.44%	1,394	40.56%	3,826
Baker	376	71.08%	153	28.92%	529
Bradford	1,005	73.79%	357	26.21%	1,362
Brevard	485	67.74%	231	32.26%	716
Calhoun	288	75.59%	93	24.41%	381
Citrus	542	84.03%	103	15.97%	645
Clay	569	54.55%	474	45.45%	1,043
Columbia	1,046	51.55%	983	48.45%	2,029
Dade	99	70.21%	42	29.79%	141
Duval	1,412	34.52%	2,678	65.48%	4,090
Escambia	1,967	54.79%	1,623	45.21%	3,590
Franklin	356	52.20%	326	47.80%	682
Gadsden	1,494	86.26%	238	13.74%	1,732
Hamilton	740	67.40%	358	32.60%	1,098
Hernando	401	64.16%	224	35.84%	625
Hillsborough	1,763	74.39%	607	25.61%	2,370
Holmes	544	94.61%	31	5.39%	575
Jackson	1,868	62.43%	1,124	37.57%	2,992
Jefferson	1,203	50.57%	1,176	49.43%	2,379
Lafayette	561	94.44%	33	5.56%	594
Lake	1,343	60.06%	893	39.94%	2,236
Lee	257	81.85%	57	18.15%	314
Leon	1,318	87.69%	185	12.31%	1,503
Levy	661	59.39%	452	40.61%	1,113
Liberty	158	66.39%	80	33.61%	238
Madison	724	80.18%	179	19.82%	903
Manatee	430	71.91%	168	28.09%	598
Marion	1,924	51.31%	1,826	48.69%	3,750
Monroe	1,128	49.34%	1,158	50.66%	2,286
Nassau	966	51.49%	910	48.51%	1,876
Orange	1,883	55.22%	1,527	44.78%	3,410
Osceola	430	64.95%	232	35.05%	662
Pasco	615	87.23%	90	12.77%	705
Polk	1,326	78.98%	353	21.02%	1,679
Putnam	1,176	46.93%	1,330	53.07%	2,506
Santa Rosa	828	66.67%	414	33.33%	1,242
St. Johns	1,050	50.77%	1,018	49.23%	2,068
Sumter	793	72.49%	301	27.51%	1,094
Suwannee	996	55.86%	787	44.14%	1,783
Taylor	322	88.46%	42	11.54%	364
Volusia	1,025	47.52%	1,132	52.48%	2,157
Wakulla	312	60.12%	207	39.88%	519
Walton	520	52.95%	462	47.05%	982
Washington	617	73.02%	228	26.98%	568
Totals	40,255	60.32%	26,485	39.68%	66,740

Counties that flipped from Republican to Democratic

- Alachua
- Hamilton
- Jefferson
- Leon
- Madison
- Marion
- Nassau
- Washington

Counties that flipped from Democratic to Republican

- Monroe
- Putnam
- Volusia
