= New Rome, Ohio =

- Unincorporated community
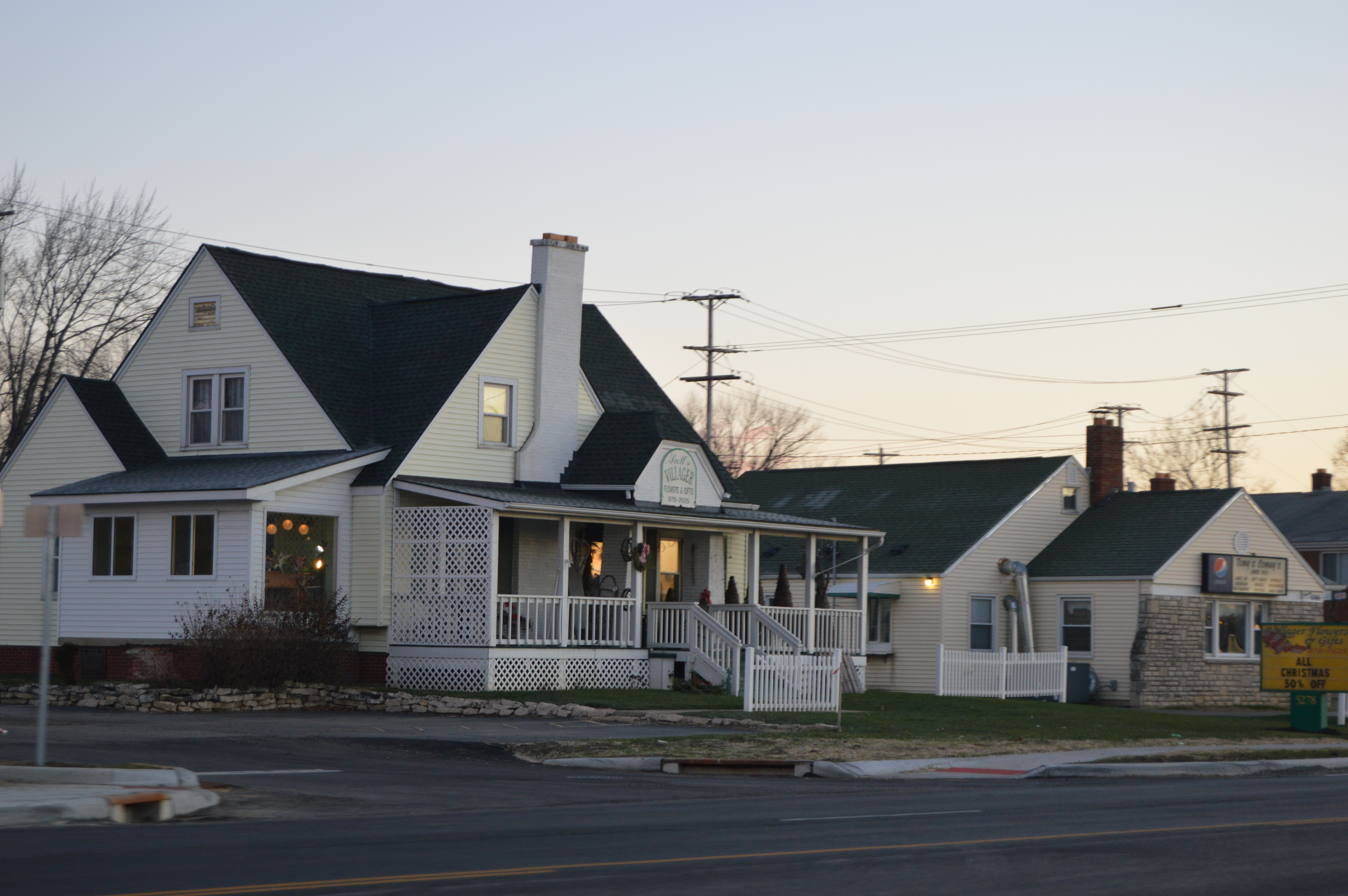
- Broad Street businesses

- Location within the state of Ohio New Rome, Ohio (the United States)
- Coordinates: 39°57′06″N 83°08′32″W
- Country: United States
- State: Ohio
- County: Franklin
- Township: Prairie

Area
  - Total: 0.017 sq mi (0.044 km^{2})
  - Land: 0.017 sq mi (0.044 km^{2})
  - Water: 0 sq mi (0 km^{2}) 0%
- Elevation: 925 ft (282 m)

Population (2000)
  - Total: 60
  - Density: 3,530/sq mi (1,363/km^{2})
- Time zone: UTC-5 (Eastern)
  - Summer (DST): UTC-4 (EDT)
- FIPS code: 39-55426
- GNIS feature ID: 1049010

New Rome is an unincorporated community in eastern Prairie Township, Franklin County, Ohio, United States, located on the west side of the Columbus, Ohio metropolitan area. It was incorporated as a village in 1947 and dissolved in 2004. It encompassed an area roughly defined by Norton Rd., Green St., Lawrence Ave., and an unnamed alley paralleling Broad St. to the north. However, the (now gone) village hall was just outside the north boundary of the village proper, on the other side of Maple St. from the Prairie Township hall. The population was 60 at the 2000 census.

New Rome achieved infamy due to its traffic court and speed trap, which received national media attention, and the internal corruption of its local government. In 2004, the village was ordered legally dissolved by a Franklin County Court of Common Pleas judge, and its residents, land and assets were made part of Prairie Township.

== History ==
=== New Rome speed trap ===
New Rome police had systematically taken advantage of a speed limit transition from 45 to 35 mph (72 to 56 km/h) along the busy thoroughfare of West Broad Street (US 40) to pull over thousands of motorists, raising nearly $400,000 gross annually mainly from speeding tickets. These were supplemented by vehicle citations, including trivial offenses such as dusty taillights and improperly tinted windows. Nearly all of this money was funneled back into the police force, which almost exclusively dealt with traffic violations and so essentially existed to fund itself. The 60-resident village had as many as 15 policemen (all part-time), with the Village Council wanting more.

Many local business owners complained that customers were being driven away by the village's reputation, and there were many reports of arbitrary and even abusive conduct at the hands of the New Rome police, who even ventured into surrounding jurisdictions to arrest people over unpaid traffic tickets. According to Reason magazine, "Anger toward the tiny village and its police force led to a dedicated website for haters (newromesucks.com); an unflattering 2003 Car and Driver profile ("a chickenshit town, a little police state"); and frequent protests outside the double-wide trailer that functioned as the village hall, court, and police station."

The Ohio Department of Transportation eventually decided that New Rome's lower speed limit and sign placement, along with a traffic signal the village had installed were inconsistent with state law guidelines. The New Rome police force was suspended by the village in 2003 when its chief resigned, shortly after the village's mayor's court was abolished by the state, and so the speed trap came to an end.

=== Theft and misuse of funds and equipment ===
New Rome also had longstanding problems with internal corruption. Several past New Rome officials, including a past clerk, were caught stealing thousands of dollars in public funds; others, including a past mayor, resigned after misuse of village credit cards came to light. Approximately $120,000 was stolen from New Rome over the course of a decade, according to the Ohio State Auditor, who also concluded that the village's poor accounting practices made continuing theft likely. Mayor's court records were also reported to have been destroyed and falsified. A federal grant to the village in 1996 to fight purportedly rising burglaries, vandalism, and gang activity was instead used for traffic enforcement. In 2003, the New Rome police had their access to a State Highway Patrol driver identification database revoked because of misuse against the political rival of a council member.

=== Election misconduct ===
New Rome last held elections for the village council in 1979, and did not hold elections for mayor from 1995 to 2002. During that period, the incumbents simply reappointed themselves, taking the line that with so few residents, there were not enough people interested in running.

In 2002, after the state-certified election of a new reformist mayor, Jamie Mueller, the council refused to recognize him and claimed that the old mayor (to whom most of the Council were related) was still in office. The controversy soon broadened into a question of who was even legally on the Council, as none of the council appointments had been registered with the state as required by law. The Franklin County prosecutor eventually invalidated the appointments of all but one member, because they were not legally appointed, but village positions continued to be claimed by those without the legal right to do so.

=== Dissolution ===
After further investigation of New Rome's history of misconduct, Attorney General Jim Petro, on the recommendation of State Auditor Betty Montgomery, concluded that it should be dissolved, though its residents had voted against dissolution in 2003. At the Attorney General's urging, the Ohio General Assembly passed a law later that year primarily targeted at New Rome. It allowed the state to seek dissolution of a village that had fewer than 150 people if the State Auditor found it provided few or no public services and had a pattern of wrongdoing or incompetence. On December 1, 2003, Petro filed suit for New Rome's dissolution in the Franklin County Court of Common Pleas. The complaint cited New Rome for violating state election requirements 23 times since 1988, failing to file a tax budget and failing to provide at least two municipal services.

The village officials did not contest these allegations, but instead challenged the dissolution statute as contrary to the home rule provisions of the Ohio Constitution. Judge David Cain upheld the constitutionality of the statute and granted summary judgment to the State of Ohio on July 30, 2004. In his decision, Cain held that as a result of town officials' malfeasance and nonfeasance, New Rome had effectively dissolved itself. "When the electorate allows key offices to go vacant for unreasonable amounts of time and allows other conditions ... to cause ruin and decay," Cain wrote, "it can easily be inferred that this small group of local citizens has abandoned any right it had to operate a local government unit. The corporate powers have already been surrendered. The body is already dead. The statute merely provides for a decent burial." Judge Cain granted the order to formally dissolve New Rome on August 9, 2004, and also ordered the clearing of all unpaid traffic tickets and all drivers licenses suspended by the village. No appeal was filed by the September 9 deadline, and on that date New Rome was irrevocably absorbed into Prairie Township.

The town's dissolution became the subject of a 2018 short film, The Fall of New Rome.

== Geography ==
According to the United States Census Bureau, the village had a total area of 0.0 mi^{2} (0.01 km^{2}), all land.

== Demographics ==
As of the census of 2000, there were 60 people, 27 households, and 14 families residing in the village. The population density was 1,993.4/mi^{2} (772.2/km^{2}). There were 27 housing units at an average density of 897.0/mi^{2} (347.5/km^{2}). The racial makeup of the village was 98.33% White, and 1.67% Asian. Hispanic or Latino of any race were 5.00% of the population.

There were 27 households, out of which 29.6% had children under the age of 18 living with them, 29.6% were married couples living together, 18.5% had a female householder with no husband present, and 48.1% were non-families. 40.7% of all households were made up of individuals, none of which had someone living alone who was 65 years of age or older. The average household size was 2.22 and the average family size was 3.00.

In the village the population was spread out, with 30.0% under the age of 18, 3.3% from 18 to 24, 38.3% from 25 to 44, 23.3% from 45 to 64, and 5.0% who were 65 years of age or older. The median age was 34 years. For every 100 females, there were 93.5 males. For every 100 females age 18 and over, there were 90.9 males.

The median income for a household in the village was $19,583, and the median income for a family was $17,500. Males had a median income of $27,917 versus $11,500 for females. The per capita income for the village was $12,983. About 18.8% of families and 18.5% of the population were below the poverty line, including 23.1% of those under the age of 18 and none of those ages 65 and older.

== Education ==
The area is in the South-Western City School District.

== See also ==
- Speed traps:
  - Coleman, Florida, the American Automobile Association (AAA) named it the nation's biggest speed trap city in 1966
  - Hacienda Village, Florida, a former village that was disincorporated in 1984 for their excessive abuse of speed traps and corrupt government
  - Hampton, Florida, a town that was almost disincorporated in 2014, in part due to "speed trap" behavior
  - Lawtey, Florida, a city previously known as a speed trap by the American Automobile Association (AAA) before August 2018
  - Ludowici, Georgia, another Deep South municipality that was notorious for speed traps and merchant fraud in the 1950s and 1960s
  - Patton Village, Texas, a city known for its speed trap and government corruption
  - Waldo, Florida, much like Lawtey, it was also a Florida city previously known as a speed trap by the American Automobile Association (AAA) before August 2018

== Bibliography ==
- (Archive.org Wayback) Anti-Corruption Measure: If New Rome Won't Reform, There Might Be Another Way to Dissolve a Village, Columbus Dispatch editorial in support of then-pending Ohio state law introduced to dissolve New Rome, February 11, 2003.
- (Archive.org Wayback) Speeding-Ticket Happy New Rome Puts the Brakes on Dissolution, Kelly Lecker. Toledo Blade, February 5, 2003.
- (Archive.org Wayback) New Rome's Use of Data Under Review, Steve Stephens. Columbus Dispatch, January 23, 2003.
- (Archive.org Wayback) Intimidation? New Rome Police Visit School Of Councilman's Grandchildren, NBC4 (Columbus, OH affiliate) website, posted January 9, 2003.
- (Archive.org Wayback) Erase New Rome, Petro says, Steve Stephens. Columbus Dispatch, May 9, 2002.
- (Archive.org Wayback) Protestors to March on New Rome, Steve Stephens. Columbus Dispatch, March 15, 2002.
- (Archive.org Wayback) Dissolve Village, Auditor Suggests, Steve Stephens. Columbus Dispatch, February 8, 2002.
- (Archive.org Wayback) New Mayor Walks Out of Meeting Amid Chaos, Kirk D. Richards. Columbus Dispatch, January 27, 2002. ("All council members were appointed to office by other council members. None of the appointments were registered with the Franklin County Board of Elections, as required by state law.")
- (Archive.org Wayback) Ex-mayor Yields in New Rome, Steve Stephens and Kirk D. Richards. Columbus Dispatch, January 25, 2002.
- (Archive.org Wayback) New Rome Can't Reject New Mayor, Prosecutor Says: Village Officials May Be Serving Illegally, Kirk D. Richards and Steve Stephens. Columbus Dispatch, January 24, 2002.
- (Archive.org Wayback) New Rome Making It Up As It Goes Along, Steve Stephens. Columbus Dispatch, January 23, 2002.
- (Archive.org Wayback) New Rome still having problems with theft, Steve Stephens & Kirk D. Richards. Columbus Dispatch, January 20, 2002.
- "Town Without Pity", by Steve Spence, April 2003 Car and Driver magazine
- "Merchants May Punch Town Ticket," USA Today, Jan. 29, 2003.
