= Lawtey, Florida =

- City
- City of Lawtey
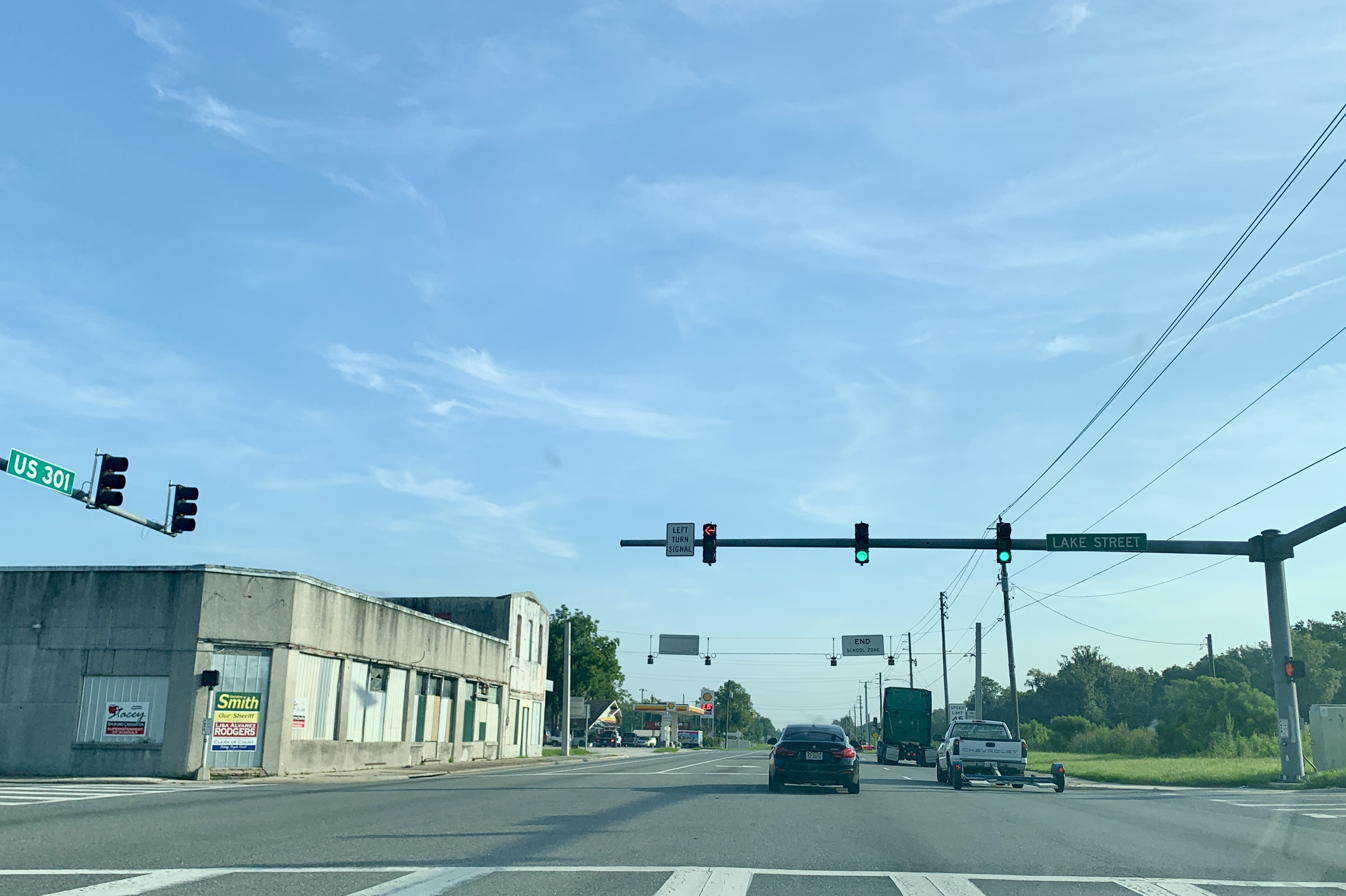
- Lawtey, Florida along US 301, August 2020

- Seal
- Mottoes: "Small Town Living at it's [sic] Best", "Integrity, Service, Reliable"
- Location in Bradford County and the state of Florida
- Coordinates: 30°02′54″N 82°04′21″W
- Country: United States
- State: Florida
- County: Bradford
- Settled: c. Mid-1800s—1877
- Incorporated: 1905

Government
  - Type: Mayor-Council
  - Mayor: Jimmie L. Scott
  - Vice Mayor: Debra Jordan-Norman
  - Councilors: Virginia Warner, Joshua Bell, and Amy Blom
  - City Clerk: Lisa Harley
  - City Attorney: Dan Sikes

Area
  - Total: 1.51 sq mi (3.92 km^{2})
  - Land: 1.51 sq mi (3.92 km^{2})
  - Water: 0 sq mi (0.00 km^{2})
- Elevation: 157 ft (48 m)

Population (2020)
  - Total: 636
  - Density: 420.4/sq mi (162.32/km^{2})
- Time zone: UTC-5 (EST)
  - Summer (DST): UTC-4 (EDT)
- ZIP code: 32058
- Area code(s): 904, 324
- FIPS code: 12-39700
- GNIS feature ID: 2404898
- Website: www.cityoflawtey.org

Lawtey is a city in Bradford County, Florida, United States. The population was 636 at the 2020 US Census, down from 730 at the 2010 US Census.

The City of Lawtey has received national attention and earned the dubious distinction of being one of only two official speed traps designated by the American Automobile Association (AAA), (the other being Waldo a few miles to the south). However, the label was removed by AAA in August 2018 after reforms by police chief Shane Bennett.

== Geography ==
The City of Lawtey is located in northern Bradford County 7 miles (11 km) north of the county seat, Starke, by U.S. Route 301. To the north it is 18 miles (29 km) to Interstate 10 at the town of Baldwin.

According to the United States Census Bureau, the city has a total area of 1.4 square miles (3.7 km^{2}), all land.

=== Climate ===
The climate in this area is characterized by hot, humid summers and generally mild winters. According to the Köppen climate classification, the City of Lawtey has a humid subtropical climate zone (Cfa).

== Demographics ==
Historical population
Census	Pop.	Note	%±
1910	492		—
1920	372		−24.4%
1930	554		48.9%
1940	427		−22.9%
1950	576		34.9%
1960	623		8.2%
1970	636		2.1%
1980	692		8.8%
1990	676		−2.3%
2000	656		−3.0%
2010	730		11.3%
2020	636		−12.9%
U.S. Decennial Census

=== 2010 and 2020 census ===
Lawtey racial composition (Hispanics excluded from racial categories) (NH = Non-Hispanic)
Race	Pop 2010	Pop 2020	% 2010	% 2020
White (NH)	432	375	59.18%	58.96%
Black or African American (NH)	262	198	35.89%	31.13%
Native American or Alaska Native (NH)	3	0	0.41%	0.00%
Asian (NH)	3	3	0.41%	0.47%
Pacific Islander or Native Hawaiian (NH)	5	0	0.68%	0.00%
Some other race (NH)	1	3	0.14%	0.47%
Two or more races/Multiracial (NH)	9	42	1.23%	6.60%
Hispanic or Latino (any race)	15	15	2.05%	2.36%
Total	730	636		

As of the 2020 United States census, there were 636 people, 296 households, and 219 families residing in the city.

As of the 2010 United States census, there were 730 people, 365 households, and 249 families residing in the city.

=== 2000 census ===
As of the census of 2000, there were 656 people, 259 households, and 182 families residing in the city. The population density was 476.8 inhabitants per square mile (184.1/km^{2}). There were 295 housing units at an average density of 214.4 per square mile (82.8/km^{2}). The racial makeup of the city was 64.79% White, 32.16% African American, 1.22% Native American, 0.46% from other races, and 1.37% from two or more races. Hispanic or Latino of any race were 1.68% of the population.

In 2000, there were 259 households, out of which 34.0% had children under the age of 18 living with them, 46.7% were married couples living together, 16.2% had a female householder with no husband present, and 29.7% were non-families. 26.3% of all households were made up of individuals, and 11.2% had someone living alone who was 65 years of age or older. The average household size was 2.53 and the average family size was 3.04.

In 2000, in the city, the population was spread out, with 27.0% under the age of 18, 8.4% from 18 to 24, 28.7% from 25 to 44, 21.0% from 45 to 64, and 14.9% who were 65 years of age or older. The median age was 36 years. For every 100 females, there were 100.0 males. For every 100 females age 18 and over, there were 95.5 males.

In 2000, the median income for a household in the city was $23,875, and the median income for a family was $27,375. The per capita income for the city was $14,122. About 21.2% of families and 22.8% of the population were below the poverty line, including 26.0% of those under age 18 and 20.9% of those age 65 or over.

== Notable people ==
- Volney Job Shipman, Union Army officer and Republican gubernatorial candidate (1888 Florida gubernatorial election)

== See also ==
- Speed traps:
  - Coleman, Florida, the American Automobile Association (AAA) named it the nation's biggest speed trap city in 1966
  - Hacienda Village, Florida, a former village that was disincorporated in 1984 for their excessive abuse of speed traps and corrupt government
  - Hampton, Florida a town that was almost disincorporated in 2014, in part due to "speed trap" behavior
  - Ludowici, Georgia, another Deep South municipality that was notorious for speed traps and merchant fraud in the 1950s and 1960s
  - New Rome, Ohio, a former village that was disincorporated in 2004 for speed traps and corrupt government
  - Patton Village, Texas, a city known for its speed trap and government corruption
  - Waldo, Florida, much like Lawtey, it was also a Florida city previously known as a speed trap by the American Automobile Association (AAA) before August 2018
