= William B. Sawyer =

William B. Sawyer (November 23, 1886 – 1950) was a doctor who founded Miami's first hospital for African Americans and established a hotel in what was then Colored Town (now Overtown). He was a protégé of W. E. B. Du Bois. His daughter, Gwen Cherry, was the first African American woman in the Florida Legislature.

He was born in Waldo, Florida. He studied at Atlanta University and Meharry Medical College in Nashville.

His son William B.Sawyer Jr. continued operating the Mary Elizabeth Hotel.
