= T. K. Godbey =

T.K. Godbey
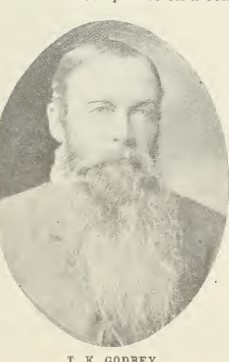
- Born: February 16, 1858
- Died: January 15, 1940 (aged 81)
- Occupation: agriculturist

Thomas Kelly Godbey (February 16, 1858 – January 15, 1940) was an American agriculturist.

== Early life ==
Thomas Kelly Godbey was born on February 16, 1858, to Josiah and Sena Godbey in Cooper, Missouri.

On March 13, 1879, he married Sally "Sarah" Brooks. The couple moved to Waldo, Florida, in 1882. There, he started his farm with twenty acres. He kept adding to it until he had over one thousand acres.

== Career ==
With the land purchased, T. K. Godbey started the Waldo Nurseries in 1889. He worked on different plants and projects, developing new types of produce that he packed and shipped by rail throughout the United States. He had found there were seven flowing wells on the property he had that he used to water his produce. In 1899, Godbey started growing bulbs and cut flowers for the market.

Godbey also grew fruit in the Waldo Nurseries that were adapted for the Florida climate including, pineapple, strawberries, and specializing in peaches. By 1899, he had created a new variety, the Waldo peach, as a cross between the Peento and the Honey peaches. By 1902, he was regarded by H. Harold Hume as a key player in the peach industry.

In 1910 he was growing paper whites and Chinese paper lilys, and in 1911 he added gladiolus. By rotating the bulbs, he could get two crops in one field: two of bulbs and two of cut flowers. By 1924, Godbey grew over 1,000,000 Gladiolius on the acres he had, and the president of the Florida State Horticultural Society asked him to document his work in gladiolas over the years.

Godbey grew a large number of different vegetables in his nurseries in Waldo. He grew lettuce, onions, parsley, pepper plants, corn, spinach, tomatoes, beets, egg plants, Chinese velvet beans, cabbage, and Japanese sugar cane and shipped them throughout the United States.

One of Godbey's biggest sellers was his sweet potatoes. In his own words:

"I am absolutely the pioneer in the sweet potato business, being the first producer of the plants on a commercial scale and for many years, the only commercial grower of the different varieties of sweet potato plants. I am not a jobber of plants and seeds; I am a grower and producer, raising from my own lands the products I have to sell, and catering, especially and directly to the consuming public."

His best-known and best-selling was Godbey's early sweet potato. It was grown from the seedling of the triumph sweet potato and was extremely popular at the time. He had these, the Triumph, vine cuttings of Nancy Hall sweet potatoes, and what was at the time spelled Porto Rico sweet potatoes.
