= Waldo, Florida =

- City
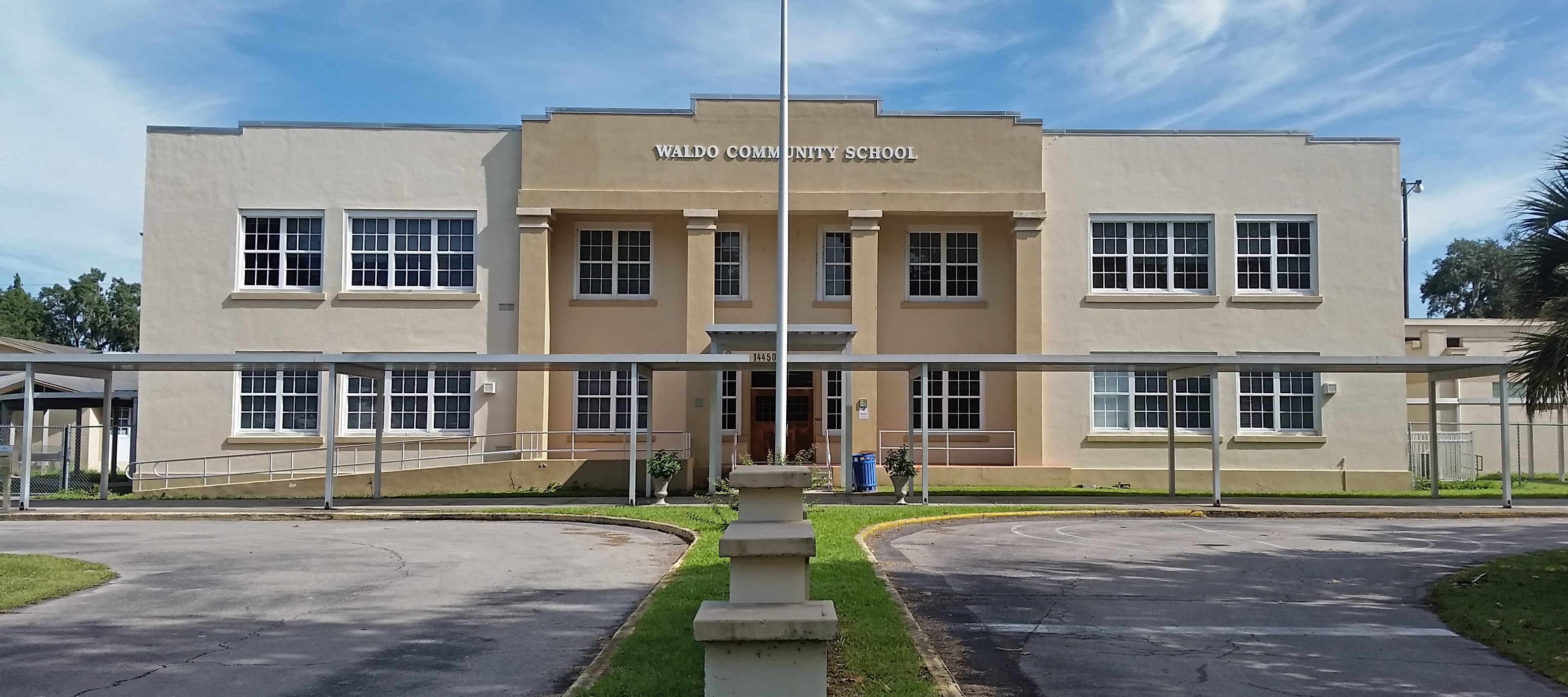
- Waldo City Square

- Seal Logo
- Motto: Rich in Heritage, A Vision for the Future
- Location in Alachua County and the state of Florida
- Coordinates: 29°47′33″N 82°09′59″W
- Country: United States
- State: Florida
- County: Alachua
- Settled (Bellamy Station): c. 1800s-1820s
- Established (Waldo): 1859
- Incorporated (City of Waldo): 1907

Government
  - Type: Council-Manager
  - Mayor: Louie Davis
  - Council Chair: Carolyn Wade
  - Councilmembers: Monique Taylor, Shannon Boal, Glen Johnson, and Rick Pisano
  - City Manager and City Clerk: Kim A. Worley
  - City Attorney: William E. Sexton

Area
  - Total: 2.33 sq mi (6.03 km^{2})
  - Land: 2.17 sq mi (5.63 km^{2})
  - Water: 0.15 sq mi (0.40 km^{2})
- Elevation: 148 ft (45 m)

Population (2020)
  - Total: 846
  - Density: 389.1/sq mi (150.22/km^{2})
- Time zone: UTC-5 (Eastern (EST))
  - Summer (DST): UTC-4 (EDT)
- ZIP code: 32694
- Area code: 352
- FIPS code: 12-74925
- GNIS feature ID: 2405660
- Website: waldo-fl.com

Waldo is a city in Alachua County, Florida, United States. It is part of the Gainesville, Florida Metropolitan Statistical Area. As of 2020 census, the population was 846, down from 1,015 at the 2010 census.

== History ==
William Sparkman, the "father of Waldo", was the first non-indigenous, English-speaking settler in the early 1800s, who in the 1820s, made it easier for more settlers to reside in Waldo when he built Bellamy Road, which connected St. Augustine to Pensacola. Bellamy Road was the first major U.S. federal highway in early territorial Florida and was constructed in the 1820s through the 1830s passing through Waldo from around Lake Santa Fe to the east and on towards the Santa Fe River in the west, where it passed over the river on a natural land bridge at modern O'Leno State Park. During this time, the community was known as "Bellamy Station".

In 1853, the Florida Legislature chartered the Florida Railroad to build a line from Fernandina Beach to Tampa, with a branch running to Cedar Key. U.S. Senator David Levy Yulee, president and chief stockholder of the Florida Railroad, made the decision to build the Cedar Key branch first. The section up to Gainesville was completed by 1859, with the intersection of Bellamy Road and the Florida Railroad named Waldo Station, after Senator Yulee's friend, Benjamin Waldo, a doctor and politician. And that same year, the Bellamy Station community was renamed "Waldo". In 1876, the railroad branch from Waldo to Ocala was completed.

The City of Waldo was incorporated as a municipality in 1907.

== Geography ==
According to the United States Census Bureau, the city has a total area of 2.2 square miles (5.6 km^{2}), of which 0.015 square miles (0.04 km^{2}), or 0.74%, is water.

Lake Alto is a freshwater lake east of Waldo.

=== Climate ===
The climate in this area is characterized by hot, humid summers and generally mild winters. According to the Köppen climate classification, the City of Waldo has a humid subtropical climate zone (Cfa).

== Demographics ==
Historical population
Census	Pop.	Note	%±
1910	540		—
1920	571		5.7%
1930	703		23.1%
1940	567		−19.3%
1950	647		14.1%
1960	735		13.6%
1970	800		8.8%
1980	993		24.1%
1990	1,017		2.4%
2000	821		−19.3%
2010	1,015		23.6%
2020	846		−16.7%
U.S. Decennial Census

=== 2010 and 2020 census ===
Waldo racial composition (Hispanics excluded from racial categories) (NH = Non-Hispanic)
Race	Pop 2010	Pop 2020	% 2010	% 2020
White (NH)	695	539	68.47%	63.71%
Black or African American (NH)	262	161	25.81%	19.03%
Native American or Alaska Native (NH)	2	11	0.20%	1.30%
Asian (NH)	3	10	0.30%	1.18%
Pacific Islander or Native Hawaiian (NH)	0	0	0.00%	0.00%
Some other race (NH)	5	4	0.49%	0.47%
Two or more races/Multiracial (NH)	16	68	1.58%	8.04%
Hispanic or Latino (any race)	32	53	3.15%	6.26%
Total	1,015	846		

As of the 2020 United States census, there were 846 people, 538 households, and 154 families residing in the city.

As of the 2010 United States census, there were 1,015 people, 348 households, and 196 families residing in the city.

Of the 348 households in 2010, 245 or 59.3% were families, and 128 or 31.0% had children under the age of 18 living with them. 144 households were headed by married couples living together which made up 34.9%, 79 households or 19.1% had a female householder with no husband present, while 22 or 5.3% had a male householder with no wife present. Non-family households made up 40.7% or 168 households. The average household size was 2.45 while the average family size was 3.10.

In 2010, the city, the population was spread out, with 24.1% under age 18, 9.1% from 18 to 24, 24.4% from 25 to 44, 26.9% from 45 to 64, and 15.5% aged 65 and over. The median age was 38.4 years. 51.3% of the population was female while 48.7% of the population was male.

For the period 2007–2011, the estimated median annual income for a household in the city was $28,167, and the median income for a family was $36,375. Male full-time workers had a median income of $33,021 versus $30,597 for females. The per capita income for the city was $15,693. About 30.3% of families and 34.7% of the population were below the poverty line, including 42.2% of those under age 18 and 14.4% of those age 65 or over.

=== 2000 census ===
As of the census of 2000, there were 821 people, 347 households, and 207 families residing in the city. The population density was 184.3/km^{2} (477/mi^{2}). There were 407 housing units at an average density of 91.4 units/km^{2} (237 units/mi^{2}). The racial makeup of the city was 76.61% White, 15.23% African American, 0.49% Native American, 0.49% Asian, 0.73% from other races, and 6.46% from two or more races. Hispanic or Latino of any race were 2.07% of the population.

In 2000, there were 347 households out of which 27.4% had children under the age of 18 living with them, 40.3% were married couples living together, 16.7% had a female householder with no husband present, and 40.1% were non-families. 33.1% of all households were made up of individuals and 14.1% had someone living alone who was 65 years of age or older. The average household size was 2.37 and the average family size was 3.05.

In 2000, in the city, the population was spread out with 26.1% under the age of 18, 8.3% from 18 to 24, 27.3% from 25 to 44, 22.8% from 45 to 64, and 15.6% who were 65 years of age or older. The median age was 37 years. For every 100 females there were 91.4 males. For every 100 females age 18 and over, there were 84.5 males.

In 2000, the median income for a household in the city was $24,028, and the median income for a family was $34,643. Males had a median income of $25,083 versus $20,956 for females. The per capita income for the city was $15,397. About 13.6% of families and 16.7% of the population were below the poverty line, including 23.0% of those under age 18 and 14.2% of those age 65 or over.

== Arts and culture ==
The Alachua County Library District operates a branch library in the city.

== Education ==
Waldo is served by the School Board of Alachua County. Upon closure of Waldo Community School in 2016, elementary students are now zoned for Chester Shell Elementary in Hawthorne. Students in sixth through twelfth grade attend Hawthorne Middle/High School in nearby Hawthorne.

== Notable people ==
- T. K. Godbey, agriculturist.
- Lawrence B. McGill, actor.
- Vince Sanders, radio journalist.
- William B. Sawyer, physician.
- Gertrude Shipman, actress.

== Speed trap designation ==
In August 1995, the American Automobile Association (AAA) declared Waldo, and the neighboring city of Lawtey, as "speed traps" and urged motorists to choose alternate routes instead of driving through the two cities. On September 2, 2014, the Florida Department of Law Enforcement began an investigation of Waldo's ticketing following allegations of ticketing quotas, with one police chief having been suspended for a two-week period. On October 1, 2014, the City Council voted 4–1 to disband the city's police department. The former chief of the disbanded Waldo Police Department was cleared of any wrongdoing after an investigation by the Florida Criminal Justice Standards & Training Commission (CJSTC). In a letter to the Waldo City Manager, the CJSTC wrote, "The decision is based upon the finding that insufficient grounds exist under the guidelines of Chapter 943.1395, Florida Statutes, to pursue any disciplinary action by the commission." This event led to then-Florida Governor Rick Scott to sign a bill (SB 264) which better defined the ban on ticket quotas. Waldo is somewhat unique in that unlike most other speed trap towns, "...the speed trap in Waldo, Florida, was brought down not by outside pressure but from the inside", as reported in May 2022 by Reason magazine.

In August 2018, the AAA officially lifted the designation of "speed trap" for the city of Waldo.

== See also ==
- Speed traps:
  - Coleman, Florida, the American Automobile Association (AAA) named it the nation's biggest speed trap city in 1966
  - Hacienda Village, Florida, a former village that was disincorporated in 1984 for their excessive abuse of speed traps and corrupt government
  - Hampton, Florida, a town that was almost disincorporated in 2014, in part due to "speed trap" behavior
  - Lawtey, Florida, a city previously known as a speed trap by the American Automobile Association (AAA) before August 2018
  - Ludowici, Georgia, another Deep South municipality that was notorious for speed traps and merchant fraud in the 1950s and 1960s
  - New Rome, Ohio, a former village that was disincorporated in 2004 for speed traps and corrupt government
  - Patton Village, Texas, a city known for its speed trap and government corruption

== Notes ==
- Turner, Gregg. (2003). A Short History of Florida Railroads. Charleston, South Carolina: Arcadia Publishing. ISBN 0-7385-2421-2
- Watkins, Caroline (April 1975). "Some Early Railroads in Alachua County". The Florida Historical Quarterly. 53 (4). Florida Historical Society: 450–59.
