= Hacienda Na Xamena =

Luxury hotel in Ibiza, Spain

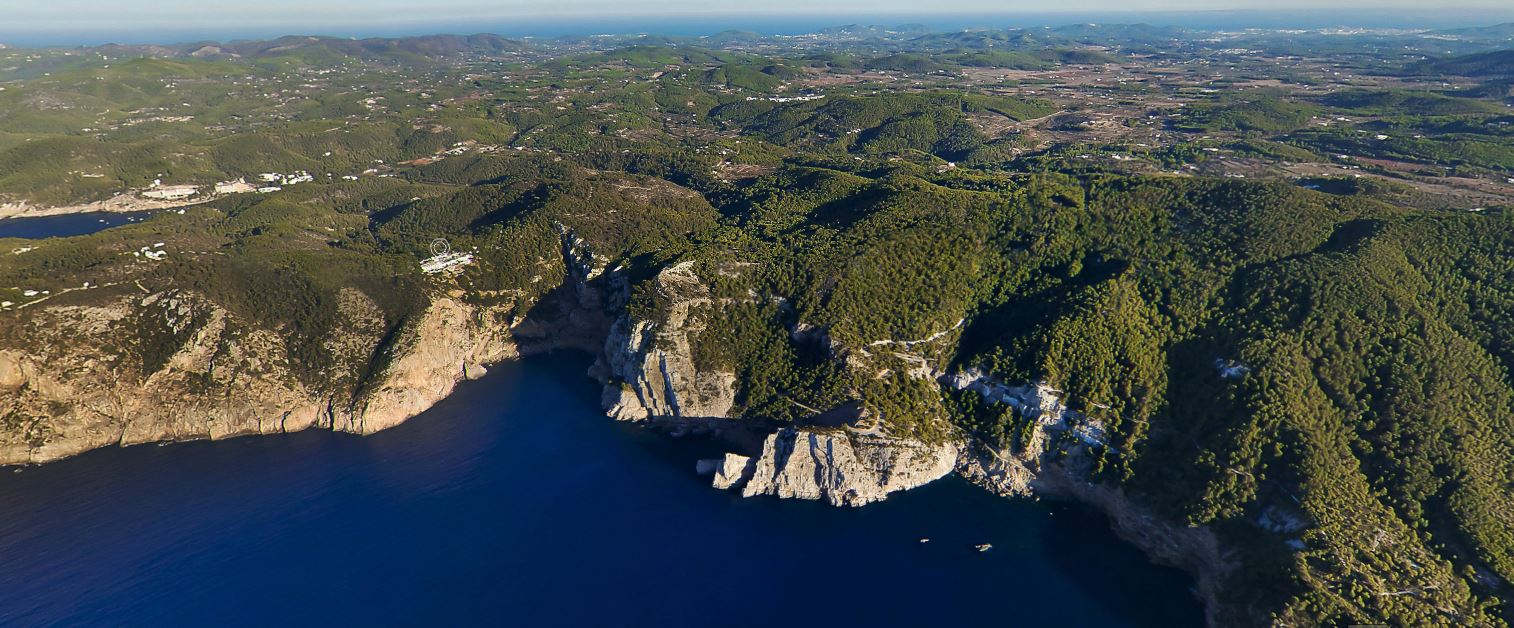
- The cliffs of the North of Ibiza and the Hacienda Na Xamena hotel

- Location within Ibiza

General information
- Location: Sant Miquel de Balansat, Ibiza, Balearic Islands, Spain., Na Xamena s/n, San Miguel, 07815, Ibiza, Balearic Islands
- Coordinates: 39°4′44.83″N 1°25′13.26″E
- Opening: 1971
- Owner: Alvar Lipszyc

Technical details
- Floor count: 6

Design and construction
- Architect: Daniel Lipszyc

Other information
- Number of rooms: 77
- Number of restaurants: 1 (Eden Restaurant)
- Parking: Yes

Website
- https://www.haciendanaxamena-ibiza.com/

Hacienda Na Xamena is a luxury hotel in Ibiza, in the Balearic Islands of Spain. It is located in the Northern part of the island, on the Na Xamena cliff at the Es Amunts natural park, elevated 180 meters above sea level. It was the first five-star hotel in Ibiza.

== History and overview ==
Belgian architect Daniel Lipszyc and his wife Ninie regularly visited Ibiza since 1954 and by the 1960-s he decided to build a hotel which would reflect his experience with the island. He bought 150 hectares of land at the Na Xamena cliff and started construction in 1969. At that time there were no road, water or electricity at the place.

A whitewashed property of eclectic style opened its doors in 1971 with 54 rooms available. In 1981 the Hacienda Na Xamena became a member of Relais & Châteaux luxury hotel chain and appeared in the Michelin Guide. In 1988 the Hacienda became the first hotel in Ibiza to receive a five-star rating. It was the only five-star hotel until 2008.

In 1995 Lipszyc handed the hotel over to his son Alvar and his wife Sabine. They built The Posidonia spa, named after a local seaweed, with a series of Jacuzzis and established a traditional ibicenco fruit and vegetable garden.

The hotel's clients included Cristiano Ronaldo, members of the Saudi royal family, actress Goldie Hawn and actors Peter Sellers and David Niven, musician Cristóbal Halffter and former French President François Mitterrand. Four films were shot in Na Xamena, including The Return of the Pink Panther.

In 2021 the Hacienda Na Xamena hotel awarded Daniel Lipszyc Prize to celebrate 50-th anniversary of its construction.

== Cultural references ==
The hotel has been mentioned in the novels of Muriel Cerf (1986's Dramma Per Musica and 1988's Doux oiseaux de Galilée) and Burkhard Driest’s Der rote Regen (2003).
