= Hacienda, Sonoma County, California =

Hacienda
- Unincorporated community
- Location within California Location within the United States
- Coordinates: 38°30′41″N 122°55′40″W
- Country: United States
- State: California
- County: Sonoma
- Time zone: UTC-8 (Pacific (PST))
  - Summer (DST): PDT
- Area code: 707

Hacienda (also Cosmo) is a community in Sonoma County, California, United States. It is located west of Santa Rosa on the Russian River. First settled in 1871, it was served by the Northwestern Pacific Railroad from 1876 to 1935.

Hacienda was a popular river resort from the 1920s through the 1950s, with river frontage, campgrounds, and a golf course designed by Alistair MacKenzie. Today, the site is a private community.
