= Hacienda Beer Company =

Microbrewery in Wisconsin

External image
- Exterior photo of Hacienda's Milwaukee taproom with 2022 branding, via Mike Simon

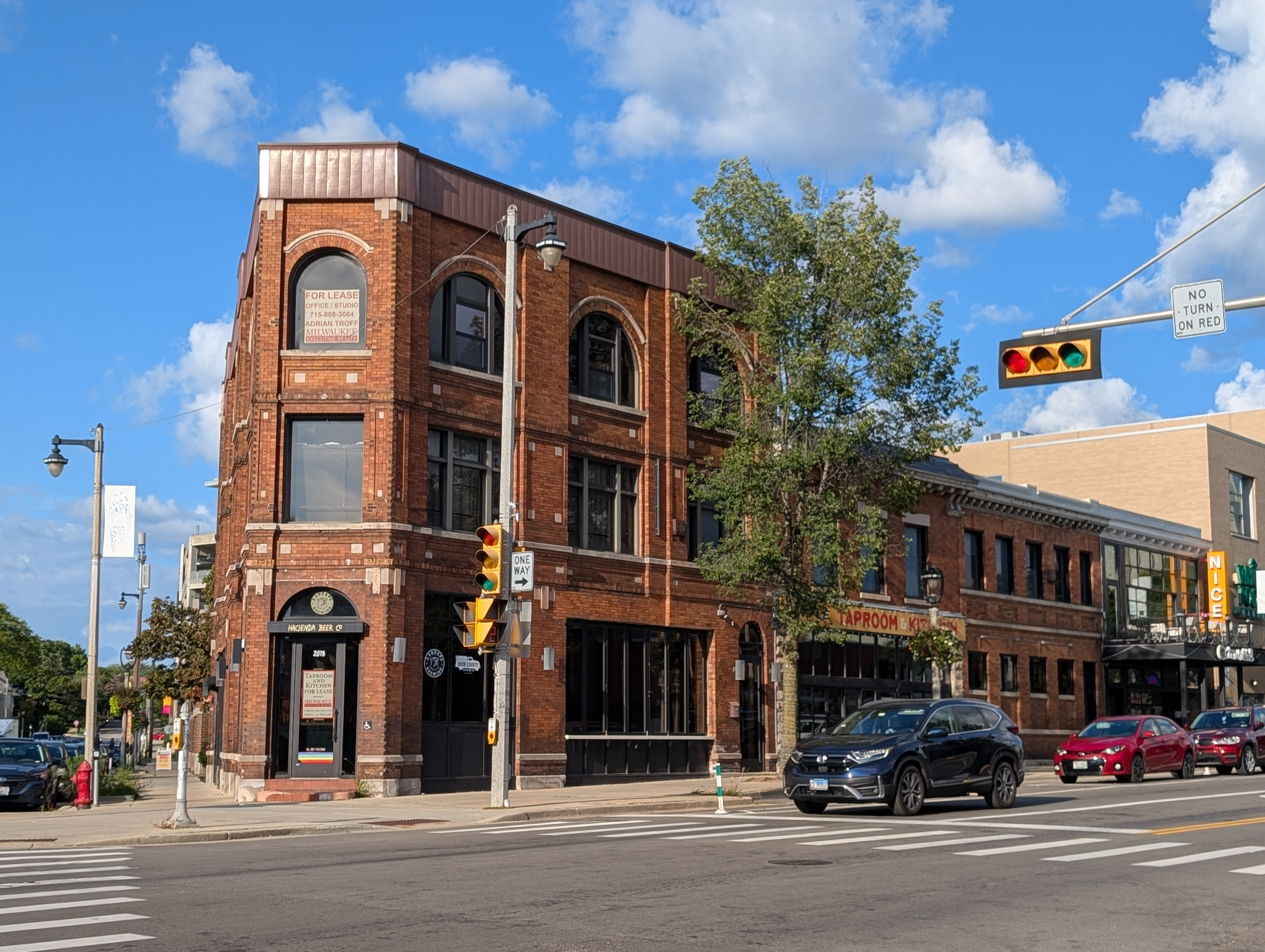
Exterior photo of the shuttered Hacienda Beer Company taproom, 2025

Hacienda Beer Company is a microbrewery in the U.S. state of Wisconsin. It is strongly associated with the Door County Brewing Company, from which Hacienda was created in 2018. (Note: Hacienda has been described as being "spun off" from the Door County Brewing Company, or as that company's "experimental arm.") Hacienda serves its beer in a joint taproom with Door County Brewing in Bailey's Harbor.

== History ==
Hacienda originated in the family-run Door County Brewing Company. John and Angie McMahon founded the company in 2012 as a way of luring their sons Danny and Ben back to their Door County, Wisconsin, roots. In 2017, Danny, Ben, and three other Door County Brewing employees founded Hacienda, giving an intentional branding for experimental and non-conventional beers—what a local Door County magazine called "bolder flavors". According to a later Hacienda general manager:

Hacienda was their attempt at doing more experimental stuff [like US] East Coast hazy IPAs, milkshake stuff, juicy IPAs ... things that are really popular out there. Door County was doing ... more straightforward stuff.

Hacienda launched in February 2018 after waiting for the equipment needed to finalize a new 15-barrel brewery and taproom in Baileys Harbor.

In November 2018, Hacienda announced that had signed a lease with Milwaukee developer Josh Jeffers to open a taproom of their own on the city's Upper East Side. The space was gutted inside in preparation for the new operators. (Note: Hacienda was the first brewery to open a Milwaukee taproom unconnected from beer-producing facilities. They were permitted to do so under a Wisconsin law allowing breweries to operate up to two taprooms: one at their production facility, and another at a single remote location within the state.) Beer for the new location was brewed in Door County Brewing's 15-barrel facility.

The Milwaukee taproom opened in June 2019. It was part of a wave of new openings that reinvigorated the surrounding area and cemented a shift in its patronage from college students to young well-heeled professionals. In November of the same year, the brewery added two lines of roasted coffee for sale, and overhauled their food menu.

=== Post-pandemic ===
In 2021, the McMahons departed Door County Brewing and Hacienda. By 2022, Angie and Joe Sorge of Sidework Hospitality, the new operational managers of Hacienda, announced a brand "re-introduction" with the goal of making it less intimidating to casual visitors. Changes included a new exterior sign to highlight the taproom's kitchen offerings, another menu shake-up under new executive chef Ashley Turner, and the addition of hard seltzers. In 2023, Hacienda won the Wisconsin IPA Fest with a beer called Back to the Flow, a hazy IPA.

At the beginning of 2024, Sheboygan's 3 Sheeps Brewing began contract brewing and packaging all of Hacienda's products. By the middle of the year, Hacienda's Milwaukee taproom brought in 3 Sheeps to supplement Hacienda's meager customer base. The space, renamed "Triple Taproom & Kitchen", featured Hacienda and Door County Brewing on one side of the bar and 3 Sheeps on the other. The taps were separated by a wall. Chef Ashley Turner departed during these changes. The changes led to improved business, but not enough to sustain it. Hacienda closed the Milwaukee taproom in August 2025, becoming one of seven closures among nearby bars and restaurants in a short time period. A shared Bailey's Harbor taproom with Door County Brewing remained open, and that facility began brewing and canning Hacienda beers by at least November 2025.

== Milwaukee taproom details ==
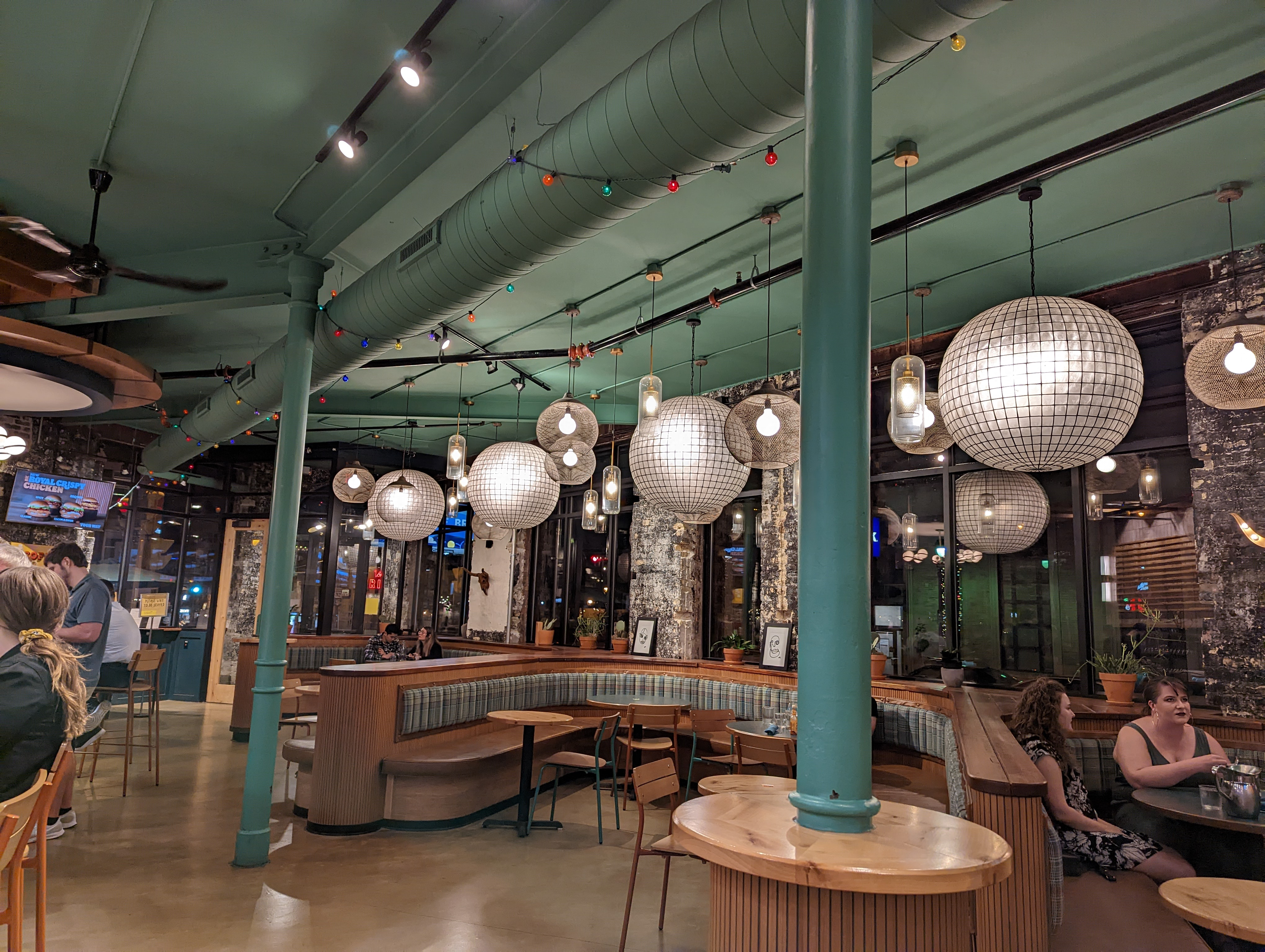
Interior of Hacienda's Milwaukee taproom (2022)

External image
- Publicity stills of Hacienda's Milwaukee taproom

Hacienda's 4,500-square-foot (420 m^{2}), 125 seat Milwaukee taproom was located in a 1913 building at 2018 E. North Ave. The interior was designed by Milwaukee-based 360 Degrees. They aimed to create "a blend of casual, whimsical, yet hardworking, sophisticated and timeless qualities."

Primary colors in the new taproom included blue, green, and orange. The builders left cream city brick walls deliberately exposed while large hanging orbs lit the space. Seats on the Prospect Ave. side of the building were upholstered with Madras fabric. The way to the bathrooms was marked by a highly visible neon sign reading "flush vibes".

The space occupied by Hacienda was originally constructed as separate buildings in the 1910s and 1920s, but over time their internal rooms merged. The building hosted a variety of businesses over the decades prior to Hacienda's occupancy: a hardware store, appliance store, bank, shoe store, florist, a Mexican restaurant, and a number of bars.

== Beer ==
Hacienda focuses on juicy IPAs, pale ales, and sour beers. At its opening, it served around twelve beers, including:

- Everything Eventually, a New England–style pale ale and its best-selling beer
- Does Anyone Work Around Here?, an unfiltered lager
- There is No Other Way, a gin-barrel aged farmhouse ale

== See also ==
- List of breweries in Wisconsin
