= Hacienda Village =

Coordinates: 26°05′07″N 80°12′04″W

Hacienda Village (founded 1949) is a defunct town located in central Broward County, Florida in the United States. It possessed both a police and fire department as well as various other municipal agencies, yet still relied heavily on Broward County for many services. It was disincorporated in 1984 (allegedly having its charter revoked after the HVPD cited an influential state representative for a traffic infraction) and was subsequently absorbed into the nearby town of Davie, Florida.

The community had a reputation as a speed trap. Steve Weller of the Fort Lauderdale Sun Sentinel stated that while Patton Village, Texas, an area known as a "speed trap," had reduced its monthly citation count from 1,100 to 400, "They tell me that, on a really cranky day, Hacienda Village speed trappers could issue that many tickets before lunch." The Mayor of Hacienda Village, "Red" Crise, originally from New Jersey, appointed himself the Police Chief, Fire Chief and Judge Magistrate. Crise presided over some 18 police officers as well as nightly traffic court. He apparently gloried in his reputation as a difficult person, once saying "If you're a redheaded man, you're either a sissy or a son of a bitch. I'm not a sissy."

Hacienda Village was composed of 14 mobile homes and three junkyards with a population that varied between 150 and 200. The small town sat at the intersection of State Road 7 and State Road 84, two major roads in South Florida over which they had jurisdiction. Residents were not taxed, as the town always had a healthy surplus of funds from traffic fines, a large percentage coming from tourists who knew nothing about the town's reputation. The fines were a result of some fancy and obscure speed limit postings which were heavily enforced by highly efficient police officers. A second tactic was enforcement of the law prohibiting turns that crossed double yellow lines, which caught many unwary motorists as they turned into one of the three bars and truck stop along the road.

In August 1970 the town stopped writing tickets on the two state roads while awaiting a ruling on their jurisdiction. In October 1970 the Florida State Attorney General ordered the town to stop writing tickets on the State Roads since all state roads come under the jurisdiction of the state. The Florida Highway Patrol (FHP) is the only law enforcement agency authorized to write tickets and investigate accidents on state roads.

As with Andytown, it was crippled by the construction of the interstate system, for the Interstate 595 spur, along the State Road 84 corridor, removed most of its revenue, rerouting traffic from SR 84 to I-595. I-595 runs from the Hollywood/Fort Lauderdale International Airport at US 1 to the junction of I-75, where it veers west towards Andytown and Naples.

== See also ==
- Speed traps:
  - Coleman, Florida, the American Automobile Association (AAA) named it the nation's biggest speed trap city in 1966
  - Hampton, Florida a town that was almost disincorporated in 2014, in part due to "speed trap" behavior
  - Lawtey, Florida, a city previously known as a speed trap by the American Automobile Association (AAA) before August 2018
  - Ludowici, Georgia, another Deep South municipality that was notorious for speed traps and merchant fraud in the 1950s and 1960s
  - New Rome, Ohio, a former village that was disincorporated in 2004 for speed traps and corrupt government
  - Patton Village, Texas, a city known for its speed trap and government corruption
  - Waldo, Florida, much like Lawtey, it was also a Florida city previously known as a speed trap by the American Automobile Association (AAA) before August 2018
