= Keith Valigura =

American politician (1957–2021)

Member of the Texas House of Representatives from the 16th district
- In office January 8, 1985 – January 8, 1991
- Preceded by: Rodney Tow
- Succeeded by: Bob Rabuck

Personal details
- Born: November 6, 1957 College Station, Texas, U.S.
- Died: January 12, 2021 (aged 63) Conroe, Texas, U.S.
- Party: Republican

Keith Wayne Valigura (November 6, 1957 – January 12, 2021) was an American politician who served in the Texas House of Representatives from the 16th district from 1985 to 1991.

Valigura was born in College Station, Texas, and graduated from Conroe High School in Conroe, Texas. He graduated from Sam Houston State University and went to Texas A&M University. Valigura graduate from South Texas College of Law Houston and practiced law in Montgomery County, Texas. He died on January 12, 2021, in Conroe, Texas, at the age of 63.
