= Gainesville, Florida =

- City
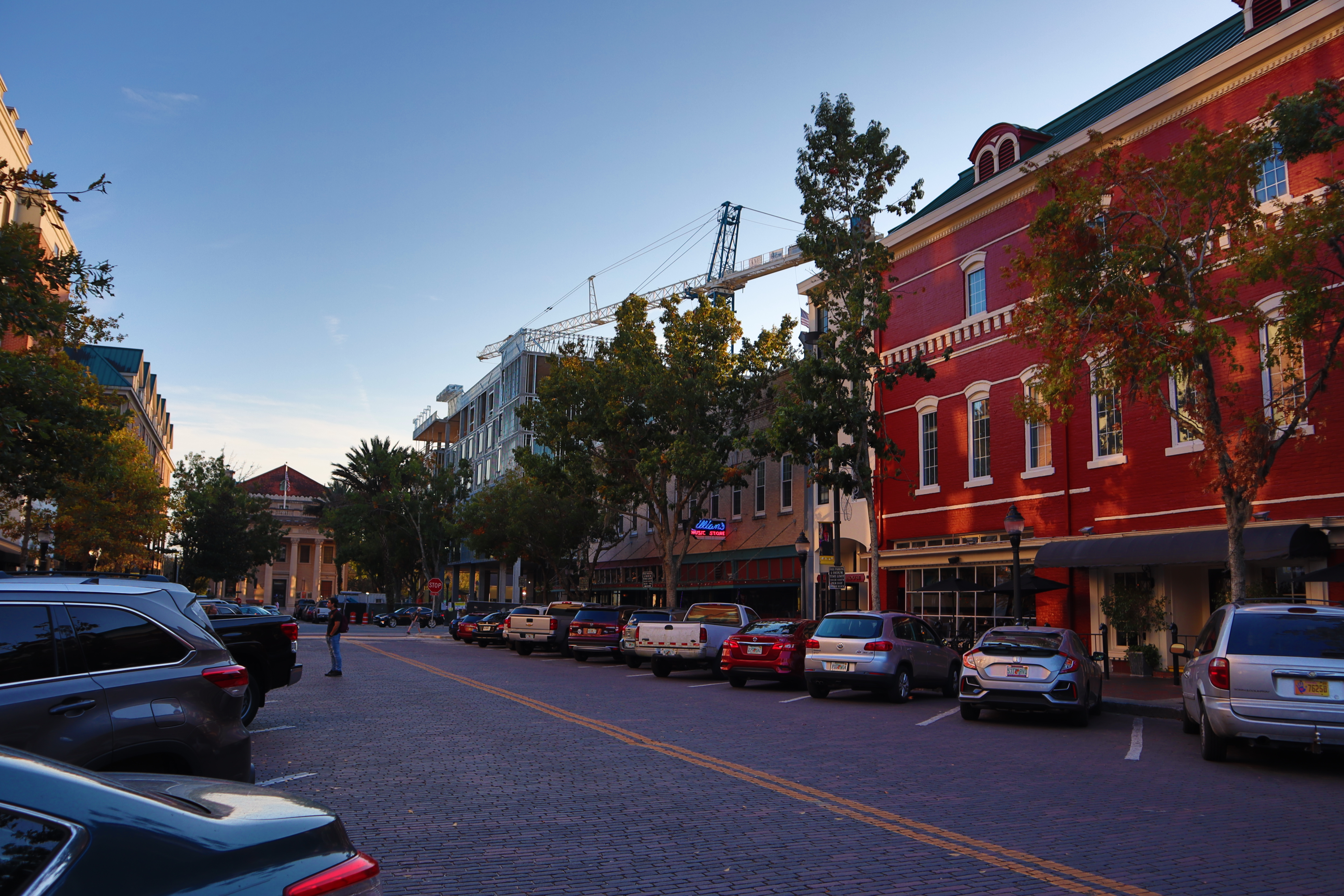
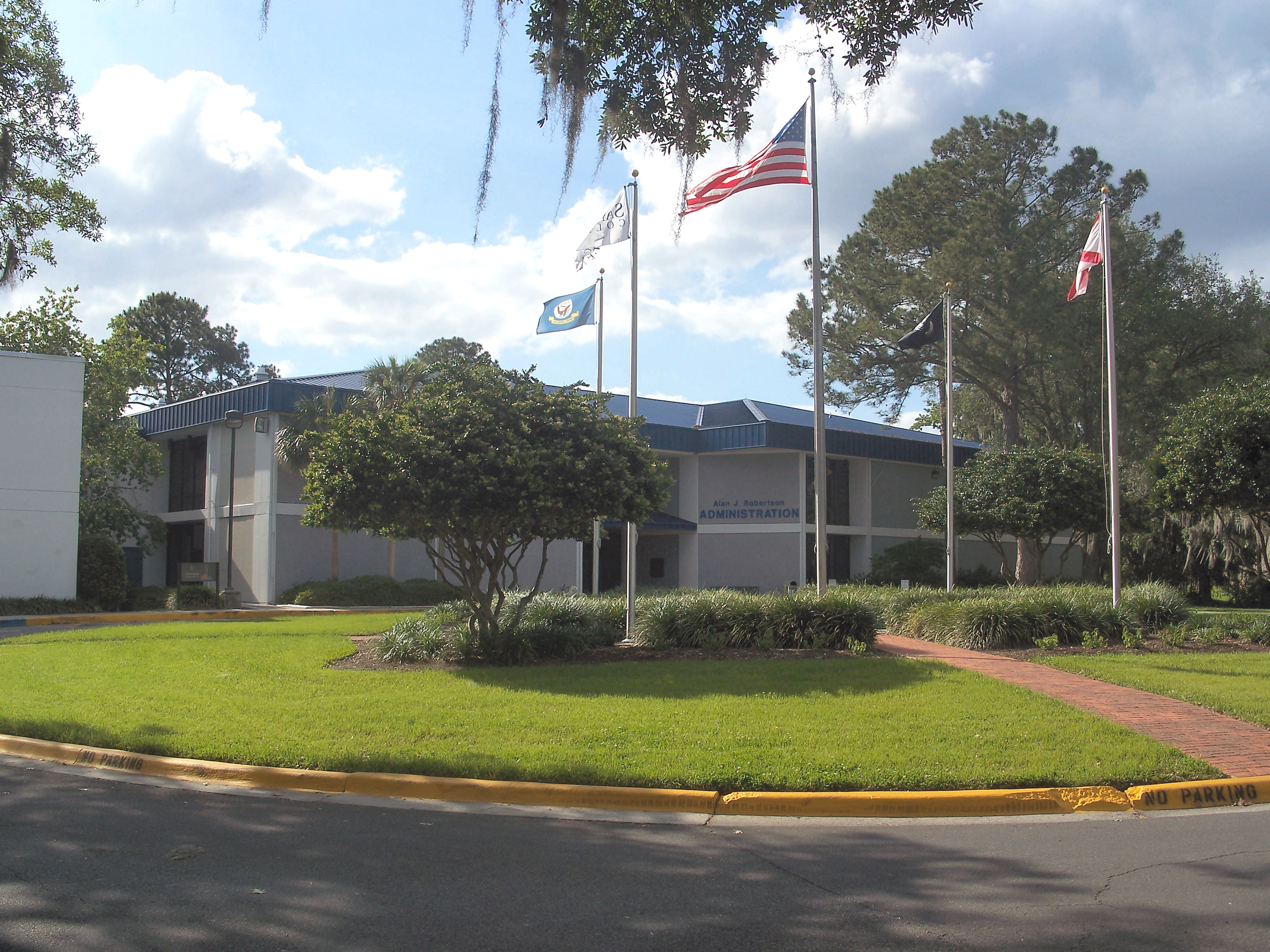
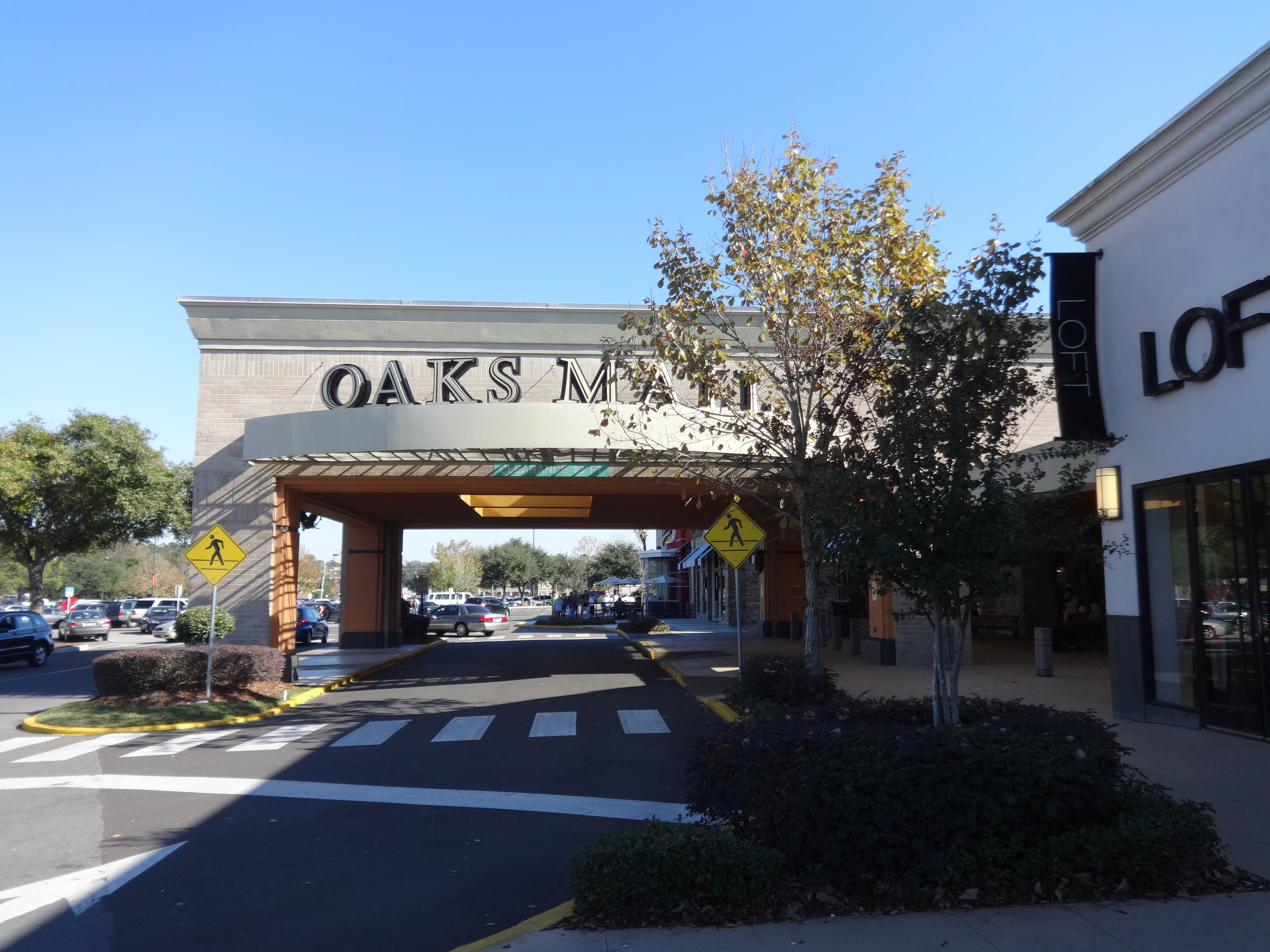
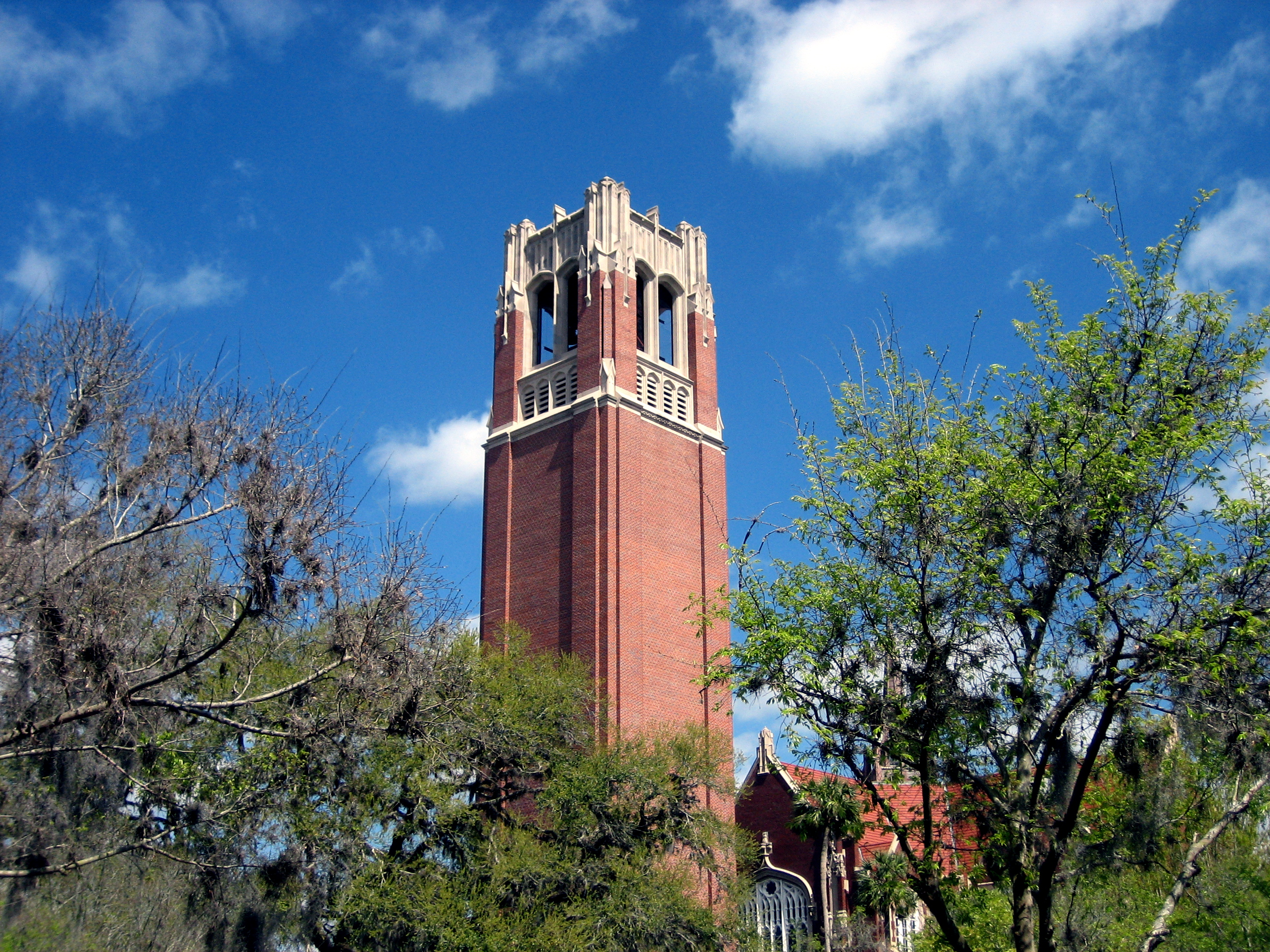
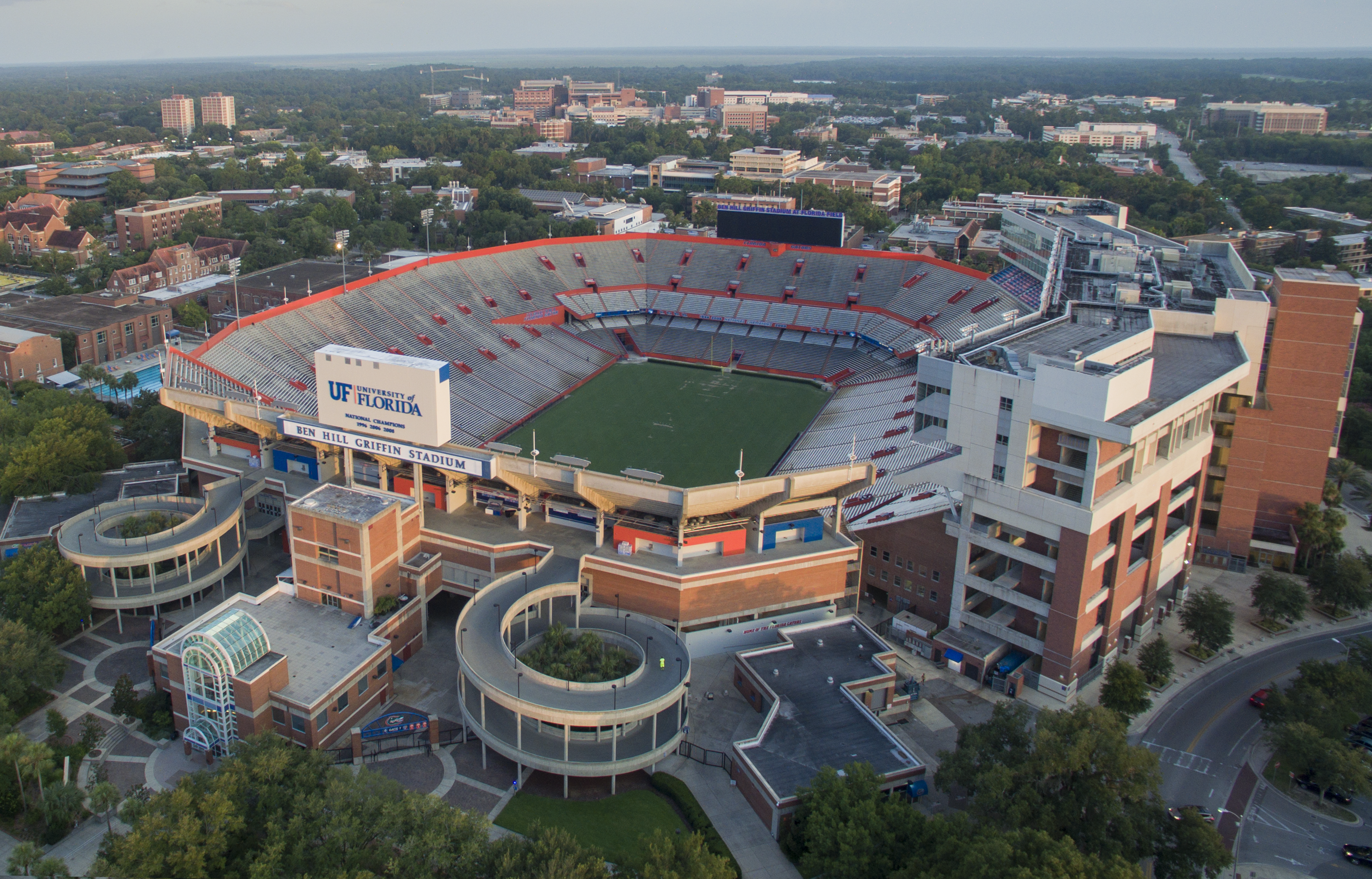
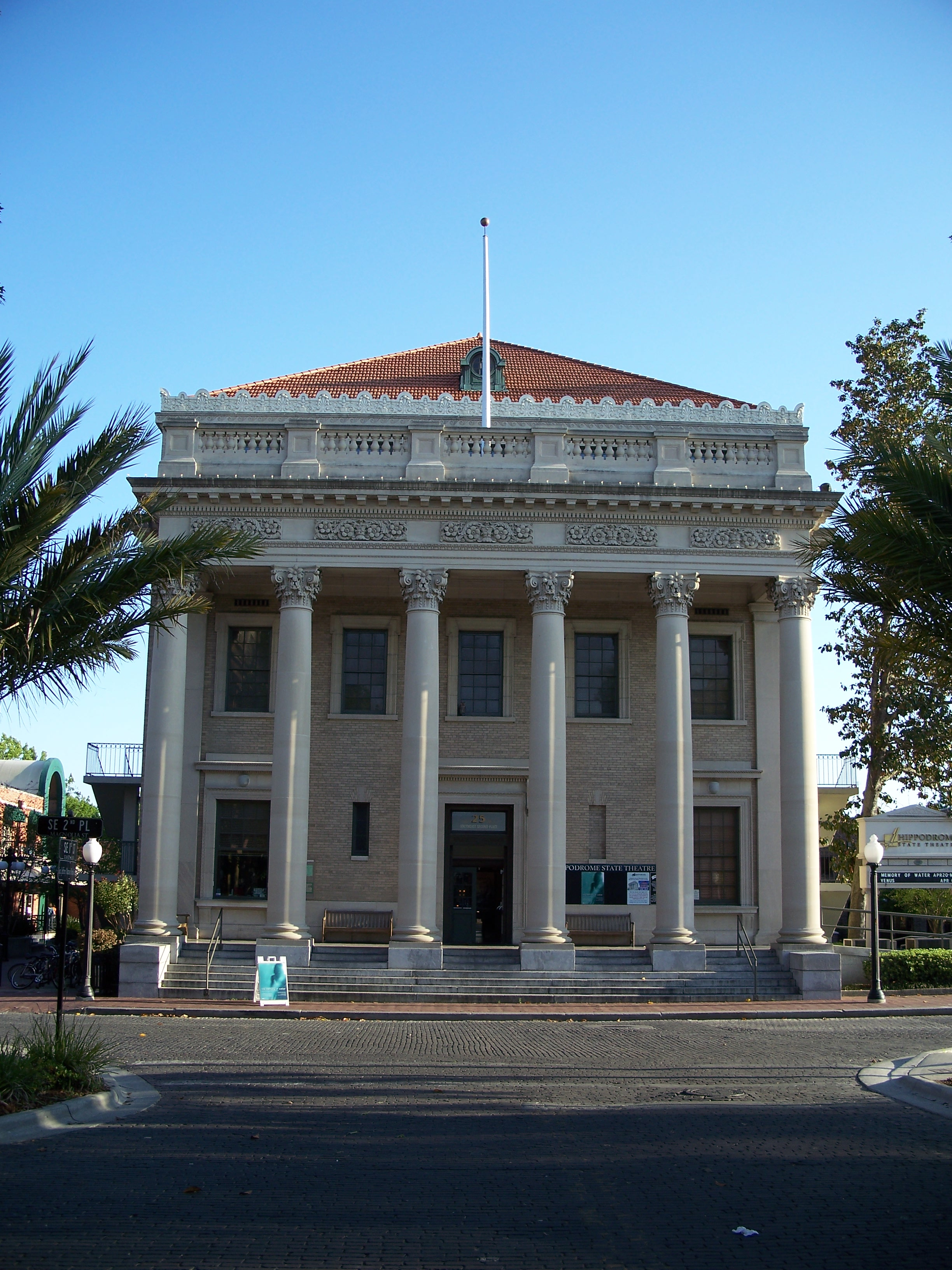
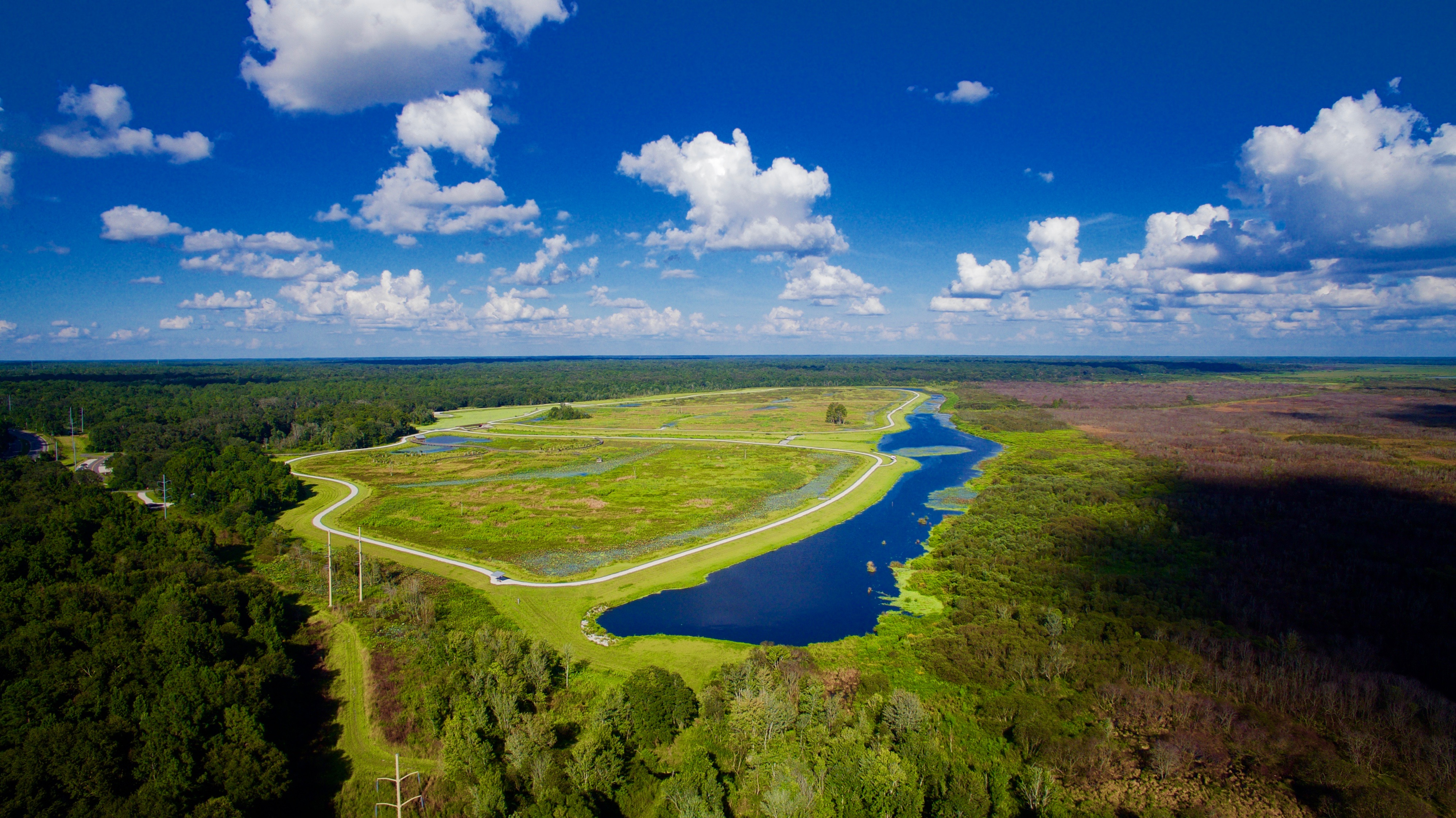
- Downtown at sunset Santa Fe College The Oaks Mall University of Florida Ben Hill Griffin Stadium Hippodrome State Theatre Sweetwater Wetlands Park at Payne's Prairie
- Motto: "Citizen centered. People empowered."
- Interactive map of Gainesville, Florida
- Location within Florida Location within the United States
- Coordinates: 29°39′7″N 82°19′30″W
- Country: United States
- State: Florida
- County: Alachua
- Settled: 1854
- Incorporated: April 14, 1869

Government
  - Type: Commission-Manager
  - Mayor: Harvey Ward
  - City Commission: List: • Reina Saco (Commissioner: at-large A); • Cynthia Chestnut (Mayor Pro Tem: at-large B); • Desmon Duncan-Walker (Commissioner: District 1); • Ed Book (Commissioner: District 2); • Casey Willits (Commissioner: District 3); • Bryan Eastman (Commissioner: District 4)
  - City Manager: Andrew Persons
  - City Clerk: Kristen J. Bryant
  - City Attorney: Daniel M. Nee

Area
  - City: 64.54 sq mi (167.15 km^{2})
  - Land: 63.36 sq mi (164.11 km^{2})
  - Water: 1.17 sq mi (3.04 km^{2}) 1.74%
- Elevation: 171 ft (52 m)

Population (2020)
  - City: 141,085
  - Estimate (2022): 145,214
  - Rank: 194th
  - Density: 2,227/sq mi (859.7/km^{2})
  - Urban: 213,748 (US: 182nd)
  - Urban density: 2,437.3/sq mi (941.0/km^{2})
  - Metro: 359,780 (US: 157th)
  - CSA: 400,814 (US: 99th)
- Time zone: UTC−5 (EST)
  - Summer (DST): UTC−4 (EDT)
- ZIP codes: 32601–32614, 32627, 32635, 32641, 32653
- Area code: 352
- FIPS code: 12-25175
- GNIS feature ID: 2403676
- Website: gainesvillefl.gov

Gainesville is a city in and the county seat of Alachua County, Florida, United States. It is the most populous city in North Central Florida with a population of 141,085 at the 2020 census, while the Gainesville metropolitan area has an estimated 360,000 residents. Gainesville is home to the University of Florida, the third-largest public university campus by enrollment in the United States as of the 2023–2024 academic year. The university is represented by the Florida Gators sports teams in NCAA competitions.

== History ==
There is archeological evidence, from about 12,000 years ago, of the presence of Paleo-Indians in the Gainesville area, although it is not known if there were any permanent settlements. A Deptford culture campsite existed in Gainesville and was estimated to have been used between 500 BCE and 100 CE. The Deptford people moved south into Paynes Prairie and Orange Lake during the first century and evolved into the Cades Pond culture. The Deptford people who remained in the Gainesville area were displaced by migrants from southern Georgia sometime in the seventh century. These migrants evolved into the Alachua culture and they built their burial mound on top of the Deptford culture campsite. When Europeans made first contact in the area, the Potano lived in the area. They were descendants of the Alachua culture people. European contact diminished the numbers of native peoples (through disease, enslavement, war) and Spanish colonists began cattle ranching in the Paynes Prairie area in the 18th century. The Spanish ceded Florida to the US in 1821.

Gainesville was established in 1854 and named after Edmund P. Gaines. The town of Gainesville was incorporated in 1869 and chartered as a city in 1907. The University of the State of Florida was moved from Lake City to Gainesville in 1906 and its name was simplified to University of Florida in 1909.

== Geography ==
According to the United States Census Bureau, the city has an area of 62.4 square miles (161.6 km^{2}), of which 61.3 square miles (158.8 km^{2}) is land and 1.1 square miles (2.8 km^{2}) is water. The total area is 1.74% water.

Gainesville's tree canopy is both dense and species rich, including broadleaf evergreens, conifers, and deciduous species; the city has been recognized by the National Arbor Day Foundation every year since 1982 as a "Tree City, USA". A 2016 ecological assessment indicates Gainesville's urban tree canopy covers 47 percent of its land area.

Gainesville is surrounded by rural areas, including the 21,000-acre (8,500 ha) wilderness of Paynes Prairie on its southern edge. The area is dominated by the University of Florida, which in 2008 was the third-largest university by enrollment in the US, and as of 2021 was the fourth-largest.

=== Cityscape ===
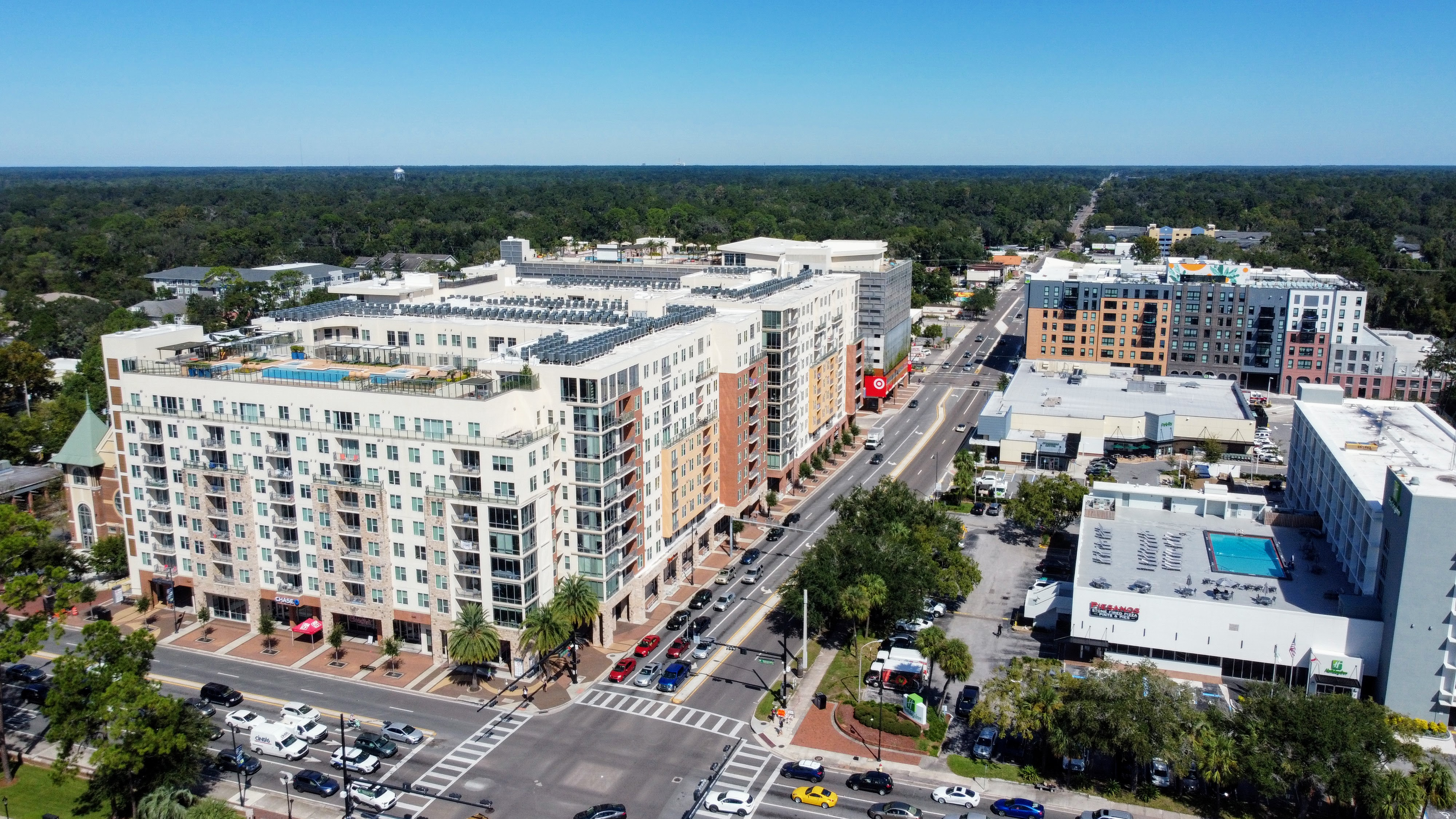
Mixed-use student housing (left side) along US 441, viewed from near the main entrance to the University of Florida (bottom left)

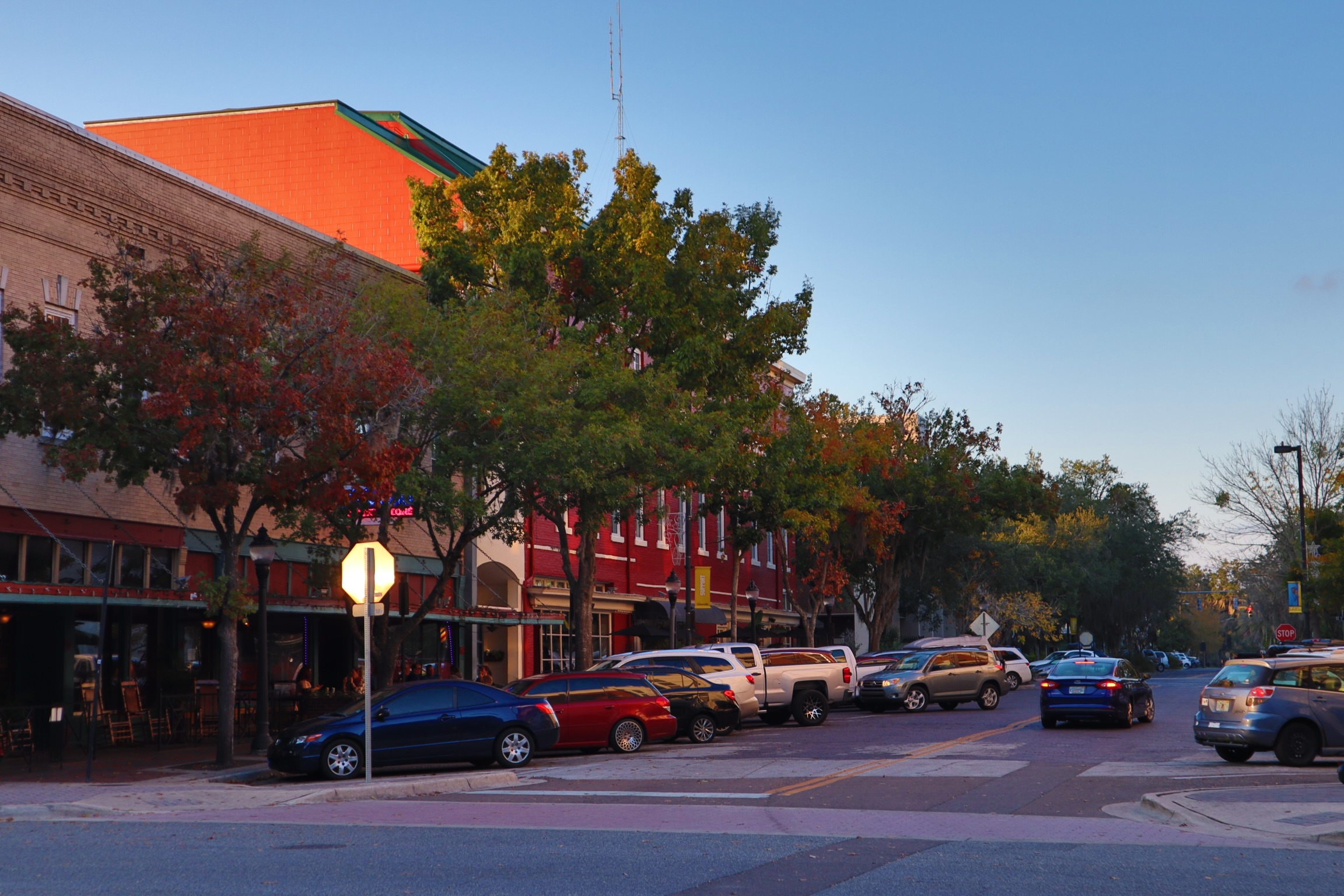
Gainesville's downtown

Since the 1990s, suburban sprawl has been a concern for a majority of the city commissioners. The "New Urbanization" plan to gentrify the area between historic Downtown and the University of Florida may slow the growth of suburban sectors and spark a migration toward upper-level apartments in the inner city. The area immediately north of the university is also seeing active redevelopment. Many gentrification plans rely on tax incentives that have sparked controversy and are sometimes unsuccessful. University Corners, which would not have been proposed without a $98 million tax incentive program by the city, was to be "a crowning jewel of the city's redevelopment efforts", 450 condos and hotel units and 98,000 square feet (9,100 m^{2}) of retail space in eight stories covering three city blocks, on 3.4 acres (1.4 ha) purchased for $15.5 million. 19 thriving businesses were demolished in April 2007, but in May 2008 deposit checks were refunded to about 105 people who reserved units, and in July 2008 developers spent "$120,000 to beautify the site, so we won't have this ugly green fence".

Gainesville's east side houses the majority of the city's African-American community, while the west side consists of the mainly student and White resident communities. West of the city limits are large-scale planned communities, most notably Haile Plantation, which was built on the site of its eponymous former plantation.

The destruction of the city's landmark Victorian courthouse in the 1960s, which some considered unnecessary, brought the idea of historic preservation to the community's attention. The bland county building that replaced the grand courthouse became known to some locals as the "air conditioner". Additional destruction of the downtown area's historic buildings has left a small handful of older buildings, like the Hippodrome State Theatre, at one time a federal building. However, revitalization of the city's core has picked up, and the city is replacing many parking lots and underutilized buildings with infill development and near-campus housing that blend with existing historic structures. There is a proposal to rebuild a replica of the old courthouse on a parking lot one block from the original location.

Helping in this effort are the number of areas and buildings added to the National Register of Historic Places. Dozens of examples of restored Victorian and Queen Anne style residences constructed in the city's agricultural heyday of the 1880s and 1890s can be found in the following districts:

- Northeast Gainesville Residential District
- Southeast Gainesville Residential District
- Pleasant Street Historic District

Additionally, the University of Florida Campus Historic District, consisting of 11 buildings and 14 contributing properties, lies within the city's boundaries. Most of the buildings in the Campus Historic District are constructed in variations of Collegiate Gothic architecture, which returned to prominence in the late 19th and early 20th centuries.

Historic structures on the Register in and around downtown are:

- Bailey Plantation House (1854)
- Colson House (1905)
- Matheson House (1867)
- Thomas Hotel (1910)
- The Old Post Office (now the Hippodrome State Theatre) (1911)
- Masonic Temple (1908)
- Seagle Building (1926), downtown Gainesville's tallest building.
- Baird Hardware Company Warehouse (1890)
- Cox Furniture Store (1875)
- Cox Furniture Warehouse (c. 1890)
- Epworth Hall (1884)
- Old Gainesville Depot (1907)
- Mary Phifer McKenzie House (1895)
- Star Garage (1902)
- A. Quinn Jones House

=== Some 21st-century developments ===
- Innovation Square
- The Standard – Student Apartments Near UF
- The Continuum – Graduate and Professional Student Housing

=== Climate ===
Gainesville's climate is defined as humid subtropical (Köppen: Cfa), with tropical-like summers, warm to hot shoulder seasons, and mild winters. Due to its inland location, Gainesville experiences wide temperature fluctuations, and it is part of USDA Plant hardiness zone 9a. During the hot season, from roughly May 15 to September 30, the city's climate is similar to the rest of the state, with frequent afternoon thunderstorms and high humidity. Average temperatures range from the low 70s (21–23 °C) at night to around 91 °F (33 °C) during the day.

In the cool season, Gainesville experiences 15 nights of temperatures at freezing or below and sustained freezes every few years. The record low of 6 °F (−14 °C) was reached on February 13, 1899, and the city experienced light snow and freezing rain on Christmas Eve, 1989. Traces of snow were also recorded in 1977, 1996, 2010 and 2016. The daily average temperature in January is 54.8 °F (12.7 °C); on average, the window for freezing temperatures is December 4 to February 24, allowing a growing season of 282 days, although the 1949–50 winter season did not record a freeze. Like the rest of the state, cold temperatures are almost always accompanied by clear skies and high pressure systems; snow is therefore rare. Temperatures reaching 100 °F (38 °C) or falling below 20 °F (−7 °C) are rare, having respectively last occurred on July 29, 2025, and January 11, 2010.

The city's flora and fauna are also distinct from coastal regions of the state, and include many deciduous species, such as dogwood, maple, hickory and sweet gum, alongside palms, live oaks, and other evergreens. This allows the city to enjoy brief periods of fall color in late November and December and a noticeable, prolonged spring from mid-February through early April. This is a generally pleasant period, as colorful blooms of azalea and redbud complement a cloudless blue sky, for this is also the period of the lowest precipitation and lowest humidity. The city averages 48.31 inches (1,230 mm) of rain per year. June through September accounts for most annual rainfall, while autumn and early winter are the driest.

Climate data for Gainesville, Florida (Gainesville Regional Airport), 1991−2020 normals, extremes 1890−present
Month	Jan	Feb	Mar	Apr	May	Jun	Jul	Aug	Sep	Oct	Nov	Dec	Year
Record high °F (°C)	89 (32)	91 (33)	96 (36)	96 (36)	102 (39)	104 (40)	102 (39)	100 (38)	99 (37)	96 (36)	91 (33)	87 (31)	104 (40)
Mean maximum °F (°C)	80.8 (27.1)	83.3 (28.5)	86.4 (30.2)	89.8 (32.1)	94.3 (34.6)	96.5 (35.8)	96.0 (35.6)	95.1 (35.1)	93.3 (34.1)	89.8 (32.1)	85.1 (29.5)	81.3 (27.4)	97.8 (36.6)
Mean daily maximum °F (°C)	67.2 (19.6)	70.9 (21.6)	76.0 (24.4)	81.5 (27.5)	87.6 (30.9)	90.3 (32.4)	91.1 (32.8)	90.6 (32.6)	88.1 (31.2)	82.3 (27.9)	74.7 (23.7)	69.3 (20.7)	80.8 (27.1)
Daily mean °F (°C)	54.8 (12.7)	58.4 (14.7)	62.7 (17.1)	68.5 (20.3)	75.0 (23.9)	79.9 (26.6)	81.4 (27.4)	81.3 (27.4)	78.8 (26.0)	71.4 (21.9)	62.7 (17.1)	57.3 (14.1)	69.3 (20.7)
Mean daily minimum °F (°C)	42.8 (6.0)	46.2 (7.9)	50.0 (10.0)	55.8 (13.2)	62.9 (17.2)	69.8 (21.0)	72.0 (22.2)	72.2 (22.3)	69.5 (20.8)	60.8 (16.0)	50.8 (10.4)	45.5 (7.5)	58.3 (14.6)
Mean minimum °F (°C)	24.8 (−4.0)	27.7 (−2.4)	32.0 (0.0)	40.4 (4.7)	50.4 (10.2)	63.0 (17.2)	67.4 (19.7)	67.6 (19.8)	60.2 (15.7)	43.4 (6.3)	32.5 (0.3)	28.3 (−2.1)	22.8 (−5.1)
Record low °F (°C)	10 (−12)	6 (−14)	22 (−6)	32 (0)	42 (6)	50 (10)	60 (16)	60 (16)	48 (9)	32 (0)	20 (−7)	13 (−11)	6 (−14)
Average precipitation inches (mm)	3.29 (84)	2.67 (68)	3.49 (89)	2.74 (70)	3.08 (78)	7.56 (192)	6.68 (170)	6.40 (163)	5.05 (128)	2.68 (68)	1.79 (45)	2.88 (73)	48.31 (1,227)
Average precipitation days (≥ 0.01 in)	8.2	7.2	7.4	6.2	6.9	14.9	15.9	16.1	11.0	7.2	5.8	7.0	113.8
Source: NOAA

== Demographics ==
Historical population
Census	Pop.	Note	%±
1890	2,790		—
1900	3,633		30.2%
1910	6,183		70.2%
1920	6,860		10.9%
1930	10,465		52.6%
1940	13,757		31.5%
1950	26,861		95.3%
1960	29,701		10.6%
1970	64,510		117.2%
1980	81,371		26.1%
1990	84,770		4.2%
2000	95,447		12.6%
2010	124,354		30.3%
2020	141,085		13.5%
2025 (est.)	148,671		5.4%
U.S. Decennial Census

Gainesville, Florida – Racial and ethnic composition Note: the US Census treats Hispanic/Latino as an ethnic category. This table excludes Latinos from the racial categories and assigns them to a separate category. Hispanics/Latinos may be of any race.
Race / Ethnicity (NH = Non-Hispanic)	Pop. 2000	Pop. 2010	Pop. 2020	% 2000	% 2010	% 2020
White (NH)	61,156	71,903	74,737	64.07%	57.82%	52.97%
Black or African American (NH)	21,931	28,038	28,501	22.98%	22.55%	20.20%
Native American or Alaska Native (NH)	199	279	237	0.21%	0.22%	0.17%
Asian (NH)	4,237	8,424	10,889	4.44%	6.77%	7.72%
Pacific Islander or Native Hawaiian (NH)	28	60	47	0.03%	0.05%	0.03%
Some other race (NH)	157	431	867	0.16%	0.35%	0.61%
Mixed-race or Multiracial (NH)	1,627	2,832	6,362	1.70%	2.28%	4.51%
Hispanic or Latino (any race)	6,112	12,387	19,445	6.40%	9.96%	13.78%
Total	95,447	124,354	141,085	100.00%	100.00%	100.00%

As of the 2020 United States census, there were 141,085 people, 51,180 households, and 18,972 families residing in the city.

Children under 18 years of age numbered 19,897 in 2020, comprising 14.1% of the population, and people 65 years or over were estimated at 14,245, or 10.8% of the population.

In 2015–2019, the estimated median household income was $37,264 and the per capita income was $23,018.

As of the 2010 United States census, there were 124,354 people, 48,800 households, and 19,478 families residing in the city.

=== Languages ===
As of 2019, 82.90% of residents age five and older spoke English at home, while 8.20% spoke Spanish, 1.93% spoke Chinese, 0.96% spoke French or French Creole (including Haitian Creole and Louisiana Creole), 0.78% spoke Vietnamese, 0.61% spoke Hindi, 0.55% spoke Slavic languages (including Polish and Russian), 0.50% spoke Tagalog, 0.37% spoke German, 0.35% spoke Arabic, and 0.34% spoke Korean. Also, 2.14% spoke some other Indo-European Language, 0.75% spoke some other Asian language or Oceanic languages, and 0.24% spoke some other languages (such as Dravidian languages, Mesoamerican languages, and Niger-Congo languages).

== Economy ==
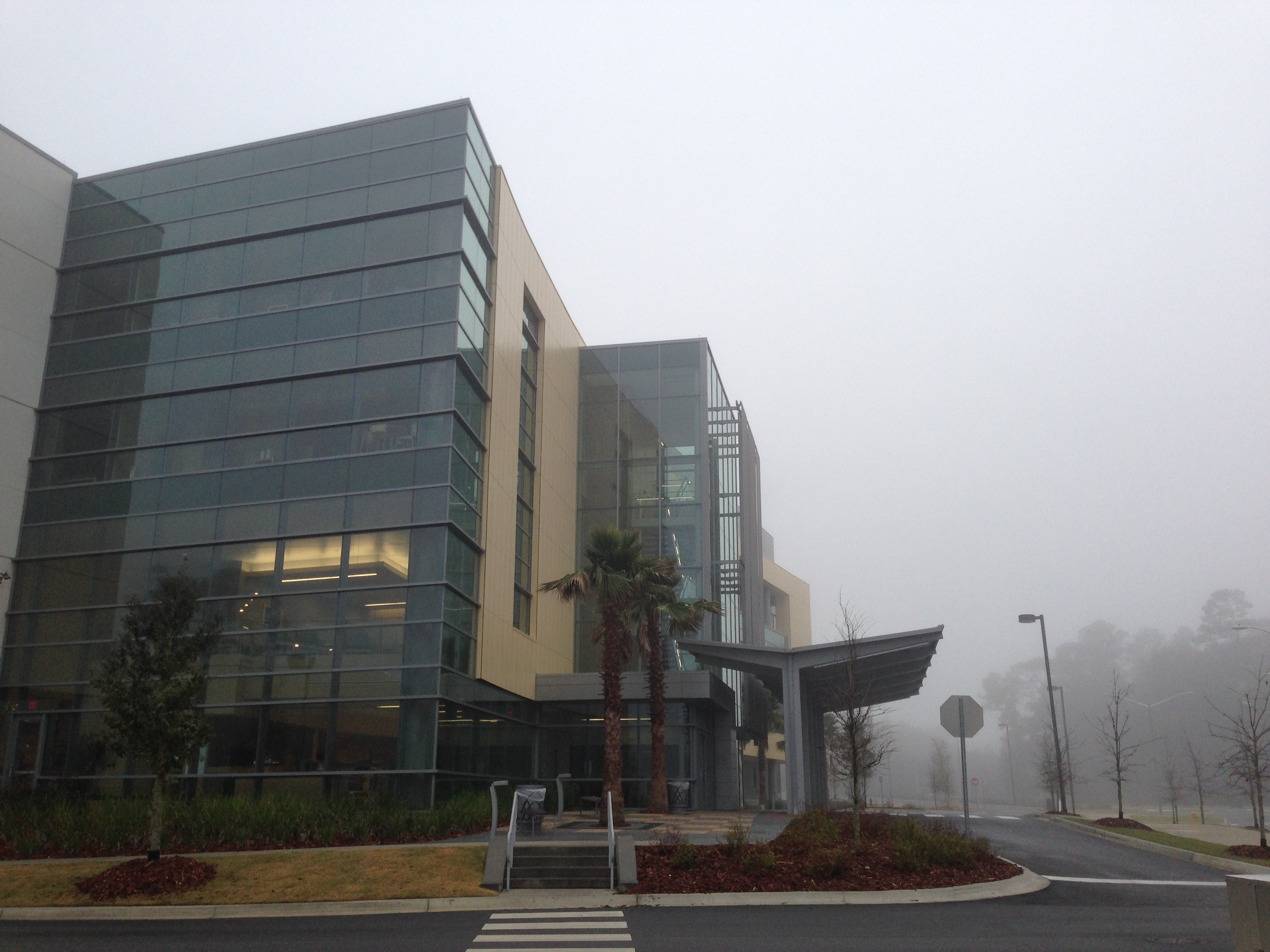
Spring Hill UF Health building

Numerous guides, such as the 2004 Cities Ranked and Rated: More than 400 Metropolitan Areas Evaluated in the U.S. and Canada, have mentioned Gainesville's low cost of living. The restaurants near the University of Florida also tend to be inexpensive. The property taxes are high to offset the cost of the university, as the university's land is tax-exempt, but the median home cost is slightly below the national average, and Gainesville residents, like all Floridians, do not pay state income taxes.

The city's job market scored only 6 out of a possible 100 points in the Cities Ranked and Rated guide, as the downside to the low cost of living is an extremely weak local job market that is oversupplied with college-educated residents. Gainesville's median income is slightly below the U.S. average.

Gainesville heavily promoted solar power by creating the first feed-in tariff (FIT) in the United States. The FIT allowed small businesses and homeowners to supply electricity into the municipal power grid and paid a premium for the clean, on-site generated solar electricity. The FIT started with a rate of $0.32 per kilowatt-hour and allowed a person or business to enter into a 20-year contract where Gainesville Regional Utilities would purchase the power for 20 years. The FIT ended in 2013, when the rate was set at $0.18 per kWh, but the city is still seen as a leader in solar power. This increase in solar installations put Gainesville at number 5 in the world in solar installed per capita, beating Japan, France, China and all of the US.

The sports drink Gatorade was invented in Gainesville in the 1960s to help refresh the UF football team. UF still receives a share of the profits from the beverage, roughly $20 million a year, however, Gatorade's headquarters are now in Chicago.

The Florida Department of Citrus's department of economic research is on the UF campus.

=== Startups ===
Greater Gainesville is home to many startups with over 160 high-growth enterprises. Gainesville is also home to dozens of organizations that support startups along their entire continuum of growth.

Roughly since the 2006 founding of Grooveshark, a Gainesville-based music streaming service, Gainesville has seen an increase in the number of technology-based startup companies founded and developed in the city, particularly the downtown area. Among them are Digital Brands, SharpSpring, Fracture, Optym, and Feathr. The city celebrates Josh Greenberg Day annually in April, in honor of the late founder of Grooveshark and his contributions to the community's startup culture.

=== Top employers ===
The city's economic engine is the University of Florida, which is by far the largest employer in the area and brings in a large amount of state and federal money. According to Gainesville's 2023 Annual Comprehensive Financial Report, the top employers in the city are:

No.	Employer	No. of Employees
1	University of Florida	17,646
2	UF Health Shands Hospital	9,944
3	Alachua County School Board	4,634
4	United States Department of Veterans Affairs	3,438
5	Publix	2,403
6	City of Gainesville	2,265
7	North Florida Regional Medical Center	1,857
8	Santa Fe College	1,388
9	Tacachale	966
9	Alachua County	947

== Arts and culture ==
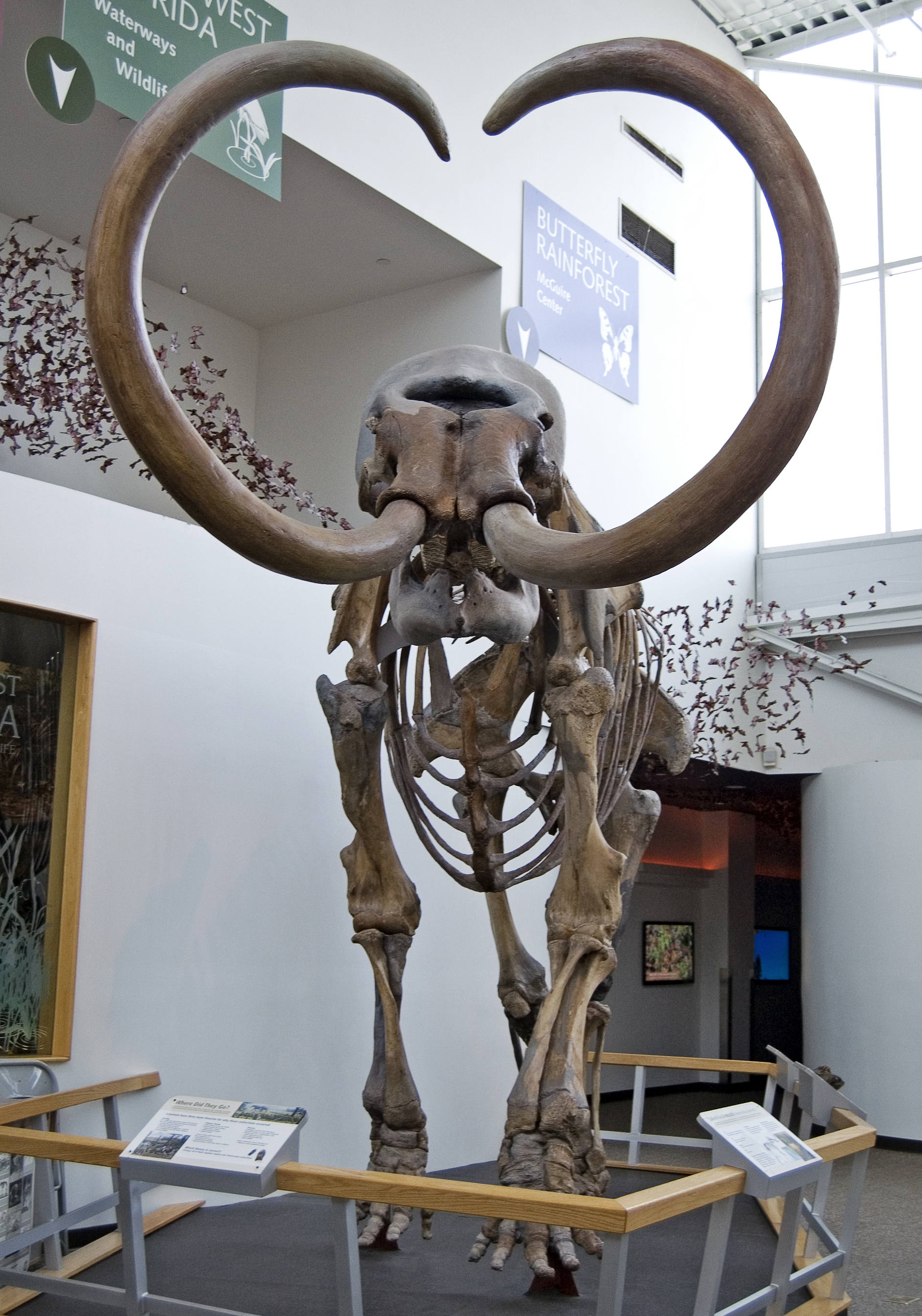
A Columbian Mammoth in the Main Gallery of the Florida Museum of Natural History

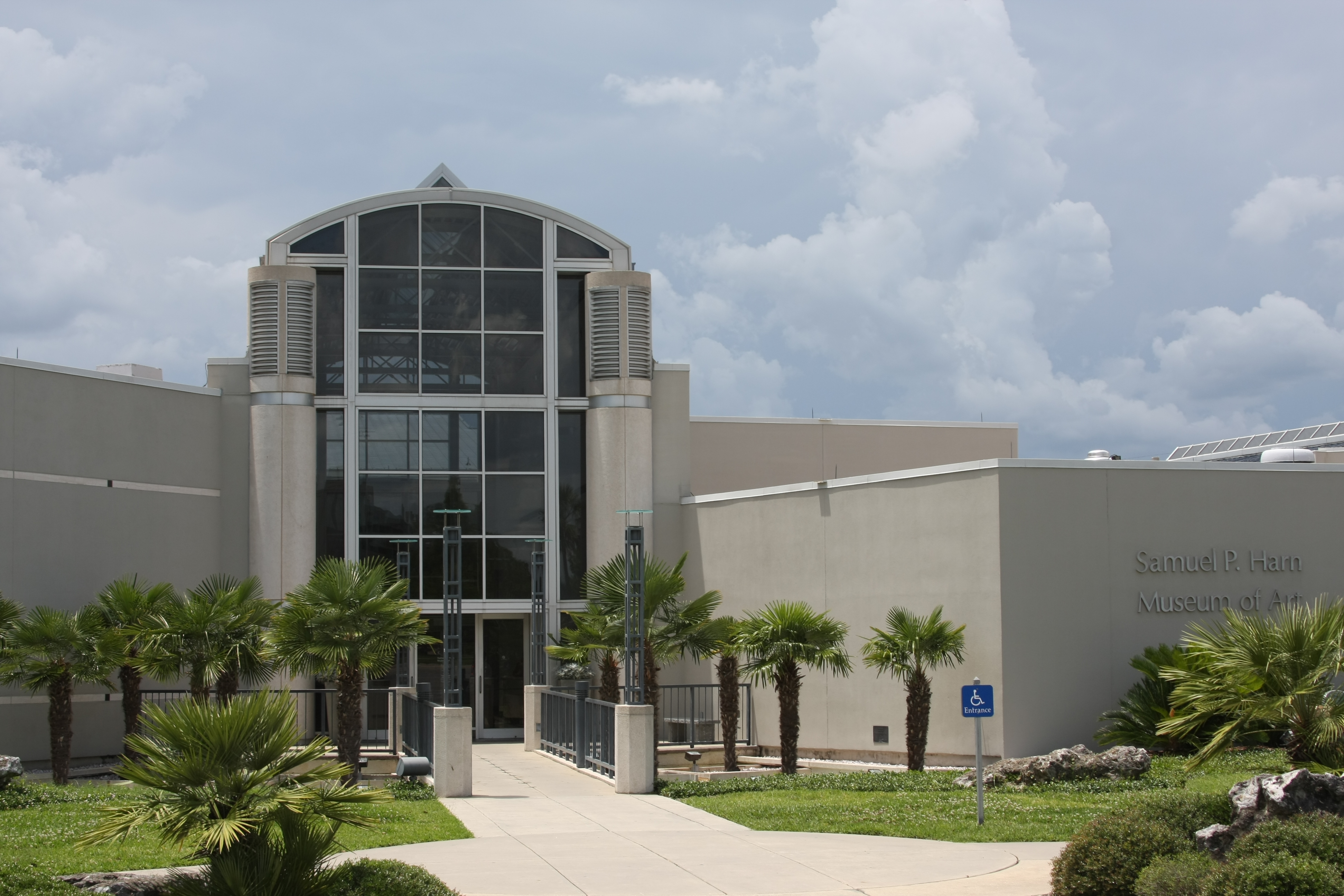
The outside of the Samuel P. Harn Museum of Art

Gainesville is known for its support of the visual arts. Each year, two large art festivals attract artists and visitors from all over the southeastern United States.

Cultural facilities include the Florida Museum of Natural History, Harn Museum of Art, the Hippodrome State Theatre, and the Curtis M. Phillips Center for the Performing Arts. Smaller theaters include the Acrosstown Repertory Theatre (ART), Actors' Warehouse, and the Gainesville Community Playhouse (GCP). GCP is the oldest community theater group in Florida; in 2006, it christened a new theater building.

The presence of a major university enhances the city's opportunities for cultural lifestyles. The University of Florida College of the Arts is the umbrella college for the School of Music, School of Theatre and Dance, School of Art and Art History, and several other programs and centers including The University Galleries, the Center for World Art, and Digital Worlds. Collectively, the college offers many performance events and artist/lecture opportunities for students and the greater Gainesville community, the majority offered at little or no cost.

Since 1989, Gainesville has been home to Theatre Strike Force, the University of Florida's premier improv troupe. Gainesville also hosts several sketch comedy troupes and stand-up comedians.

In April 2003, Gainesville became known as the "Healthiest Community in America" when it won the only "Gold Well City" award given by the Wellness Councils of America (WELCOA). Headed up by Gainesville Health & Fitness Centers, and with the support of Shands HealthCare and the Gainesville Area Chamber of Commerce, 21 businesses comprising 60 percent of the city's workforce became involved in the "Gold Well City" effort. As of July 2011, Gainesville remained the only city in the country to win the award.

=== Homelessness issues ===
Reports released in 2004 and 2009 by the National Coalition for the Homeless cited Gainesville as the 5th meanest city in the United States for its criminalization of homelessness, the latter time for its meal limit ordinance. Gainesville has a number of ordinances targeting the homeless, including an anti-panhandling measure and one prohibiting sleeping outdoors on public property. In 2005, the Alachua Board of County Commissioners and the Gainesville City Commission responded by issuing a written "Ten Year Plan to End Homelessness"; which was followed by the 2010 "A Needs Assessment of Unsheltered Homeless Individuals In Gainesville, Florida" presentation to a joint meeting of Gainesville and Alachua County Commissions. An indoor homeless shelter was built on the site of the former Gainesville Correctional Institution grounds, with surrounding area designated for tents.

=== Marijuana culture ===
Gainesville is renowned in recreational drug culture for "Gainesville Green", a particularly potent strain of marijuana. Orange and Blue magazine published a feature article in 2003 about the history of Gainesville Green and the local marijuana culture in general. In the mid-1990s, several Gainesville Hemp Festivals took place outside the Alachua County courthouse.

=== Music scene ===
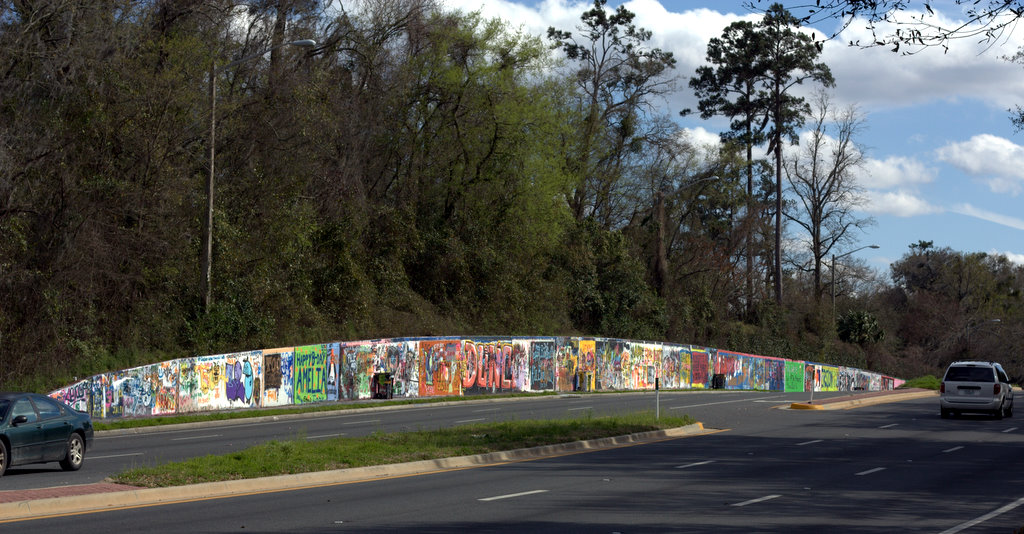
34th Street Wall

Gainesville is well known for its music scene and has spawned a number of bands and musicians, including Tom Petty and the Heartbreakers, Stephen Stills, Don Felder and Bernie Leadon of The Eagles, Against Me!, Charles Bradley, Less Than Jake, Hot Water Music, As Friends Rust, Bridget Kelly Band, John Vanderslice, Sister Hazel, Hundred Waters, Flipturn, and For Squirrels. It is also the location of independent labels No Idea Records and Elestial Sound, and the former home of Plan-It-X Records, which moved to Bloomington, Indiana. For two years, the Gainesville nonprofit Harvest of Hope Foundation hosted the Harvest of Hope Fest in St. Augustine.

Between 1987 and 1998, Gainesville had a very active rock music scene, with Hollywood star River Phoenix having the local club Hardback Cafe as his main base. Phoenix's band Aleka's Attic was a constant feature of the rock scene. The Phoenix family is still a presence in Gainesville, with Rain Phoenix's band Papercranes and Liberty Phoenix's store, Indigo.

Gainesville is still known for its strong music community and was named "Best Place to Start a Band in the United States" by Blender magazine in March 2008. The article cited the large student population, cheap rent, and friendly venues.

Gainesville has been home to a wide variety of bands, from the Latin/afrobeat sounds of Umoja Orchestra, to the rock of Morningbell, to ska staples The Know How.

Gainesville's reputation as an independent music mecca can be traced back to 1984 when a local music video station was brought on the air. The station was called TV-69, broadcast on UHF 69 and was owned by Cozzin Communications. The channel drew considerable media attention thanks to its promotion by Bill Cosby, who was part owner of the station when it started. TV-69 featured many videos by punk and indie-label bands and had several locally produced videos ("Clone Love" by a local parody band, and a Dinosaur Jr. song).

=== Annual cultural events ===
- The Spring Arts Festival, hosted each year, usually in early April, by Santa Fe College (formerly Santa Fe Community College), is one of the three largest annual events in Gainesville and known for its high-quality, unique artwork and vendors.
- The nationally recognized Downtown Festival and Art Show, hosted each fall by the City of Gainesville, attracts award-winning artists and a crowd of more than 100,000.
- The Hoggetowne Medieval Faire has attracted thousands of fairgoers for over 20 years.
- The Fest, a multi-day, multiple-venue underground music festival held annually in Gainesville since 2002.

== Sports ==
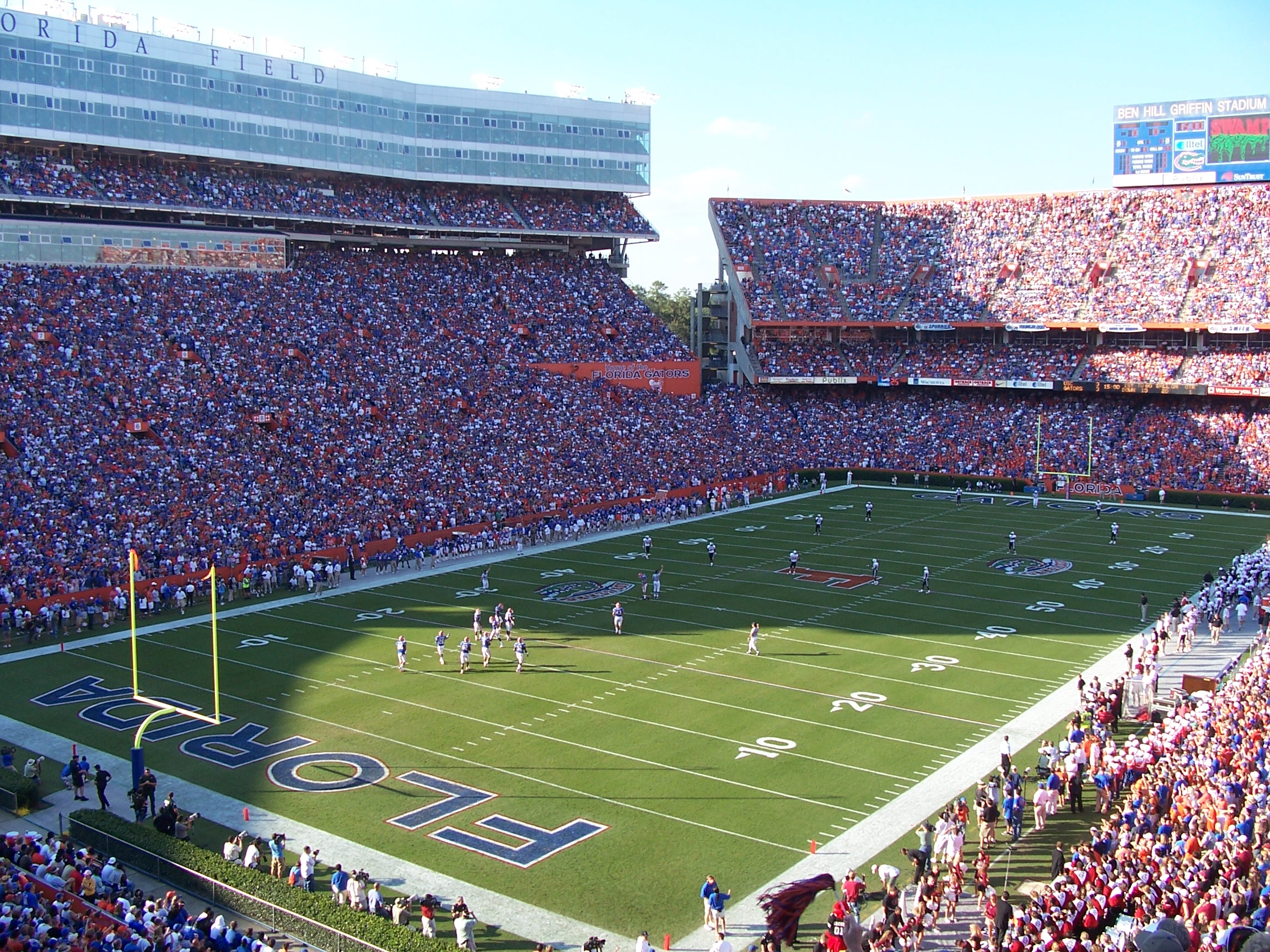
Ben Hill Griffin Stadium

The Florida Gators is the varsity team of the University of Florida, competing in the Southeastern Conference of the National Collegiate Athletic Association since 1933. As of 2025, UF has won 49 national team championships. All Florida Gators sports teams have on-campus facilities in Gainesville, including Steve Spurrier-Florida Field at Ben Hill Griffin Stadium for football; the Exactech Arena at the Stephen C. O'Connell Center for basketball, gymnastics, swimming and diving, indoor track and field, and volleyball; and James G. Pressly Stadium for outdoor track and field. The Katie Seashole Pressly Softball Stadium for softball, the Condron Ballpark for baseball, and the Donald R. Dizney Stadium for soccer and lacrosse are located on Hull Road on the southwestern side of the campus. The Mark Bostick Golf Course and Scott Linder Stadium for tennis are located on S.W. Second Avenue on the northwestern side of the campus.

Opened in 1969, the Gainesville Raceway is a dragstrip that hosts the Gatornationals, one of the four NHRA major races.

Gainesville Roller Rebels is a women's flat track roller derby league founded in 2007. Gainesville is a member of the Women's Flat Track Derby Association. The Gainesville G-Men were a professional minor league baseball team that played in the Florida State League between 1936 and 1958.

== Politics ==
The counties surrounding Alachua County vote strongly Republican, while Alachua County votes strongly Democratic.

General Election Results for Alachua County - US President

Year	Voter turnout	Democrat	Democratic votes	Democratic %	Republican	Republican votes	Republican %	Total Votes
2008	80.59%	Barack Obama	75,565	59.99%	John McCain	48,513	38.51%	125,967
2012	73.40%	Barack Obama	69,699	57.71%	Mitt Romney	48,797	40.40%	120,773
2016	73.60%	Hillary Clinton	75,820	58.97%	Donald Trump	46,834	36.43%	128,571
2020	75.42%	Joseph Biden	89,704	62.71%	Donald Trump	50,972	35.63%	142,584
2024	84.57%	Kamala Harris	81,578	59.74%	Donald Trump	52,939	38.77%	136,548

== Government ==
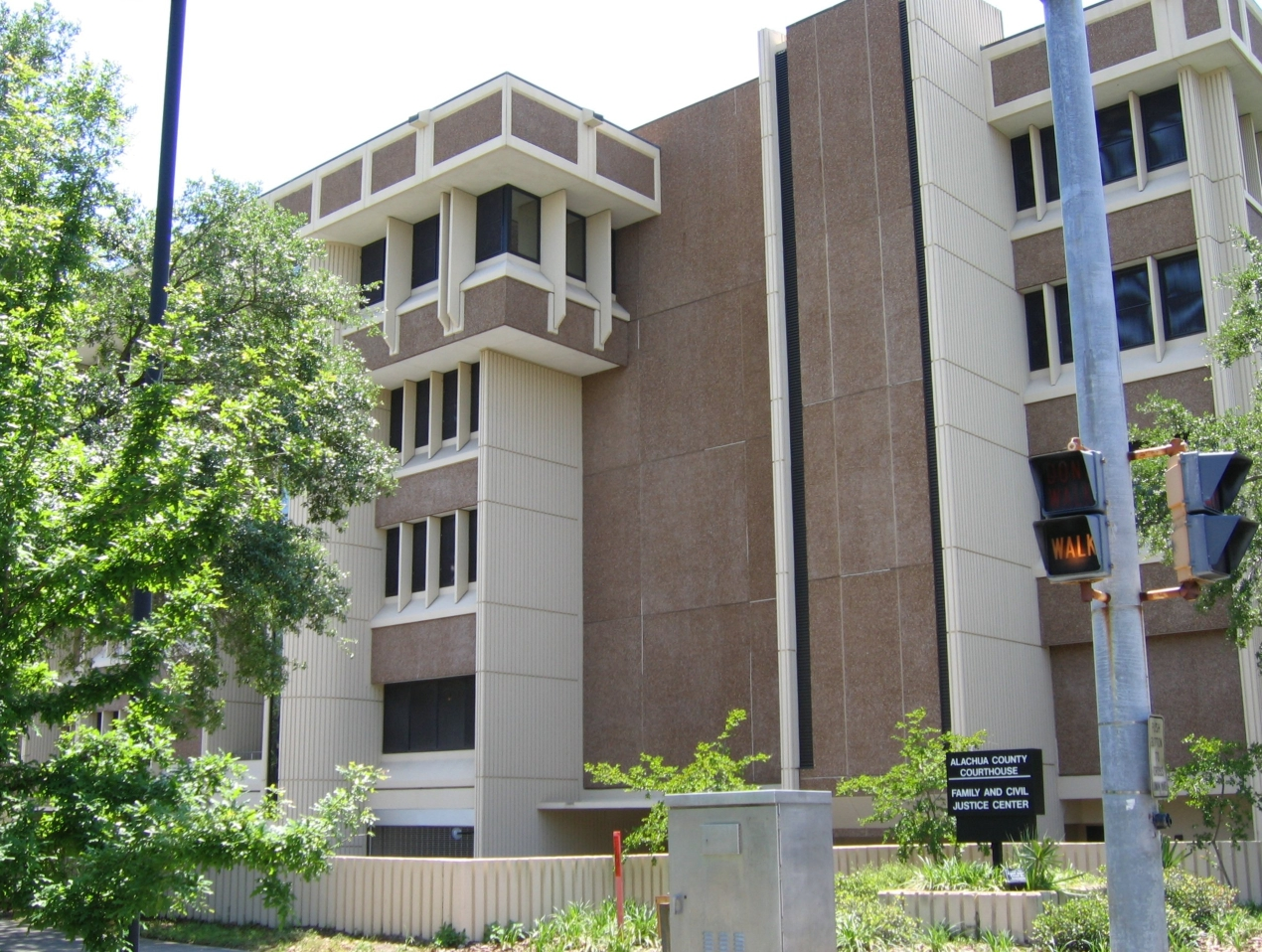
Alachua County Courthouse Family and Civil Justice Center

The council–manager government is the form of municipal government used in Gainesville. The day-to-day operations of the city are run by a professional city manager who is appointed by the elected city commission. Gainesville's city hall is at 200 E University Avenue.

The legislative power of the city is vested in a city commission of seven members, one of whom is the mayor. The mayor and two other commissioners are elected at-large, while the other four are elected from single-member districts to represent a quarter of the city. The city commission is responsible for legislative functions such as establishing policy, passing local ordinances, voting appropriations, and developing an overall vision, like a corporate board of directors, in addition to appointing several professional staff persons.

Gainesville City Commission
District	Office Holder	Party
District 1	Desmon Duncan-Walker	Democratic
District 2	Ed Book	Democratic
District 3	Casey Willits	Democratic
District 4	Bryan Eastman	Democratic
At-large A	James Ingle	Democratic
At-large B	Cynthia Chestnut	Democratic

The Mayor of Gainesville is the presiding officer of the city commission and has a voice and a vote in its proceedings but no veto power. The current mayor is Harvey Ward, a registered Democrat who took office in 2023.

Municipal elections are nonpartisan and use a two-round system, i.e., if no candidate receives a majority of the vote, a runoff election ensues between the two candidates who received the most votes. The mayor and other commissioners are elected to a term the length of which is in transition; in any case, neither the mayor nor any other commissioner may serve more than two consecutive terms, excepting following a partial term created by a vacancy. Mayoral terms are reckoned separately from terms as another commissioner, allowing a commissioner to serve more consecutive terms by alternating between the positions.

=== Departments ===
Law enforcement is provided by Gainesville Police Department, except on the University of Florida campus, which operates the University Police Department. Gainesville Police Department is at 545 NW 8th Avenue.

Fire protection within the city limits is provided by the Gainesville Fire Rescue, while the surrounding county is served by the Alachua County Fire Rescue. Alachua County Fire Rescue provides ambulance services for the whole county.

== Education ==
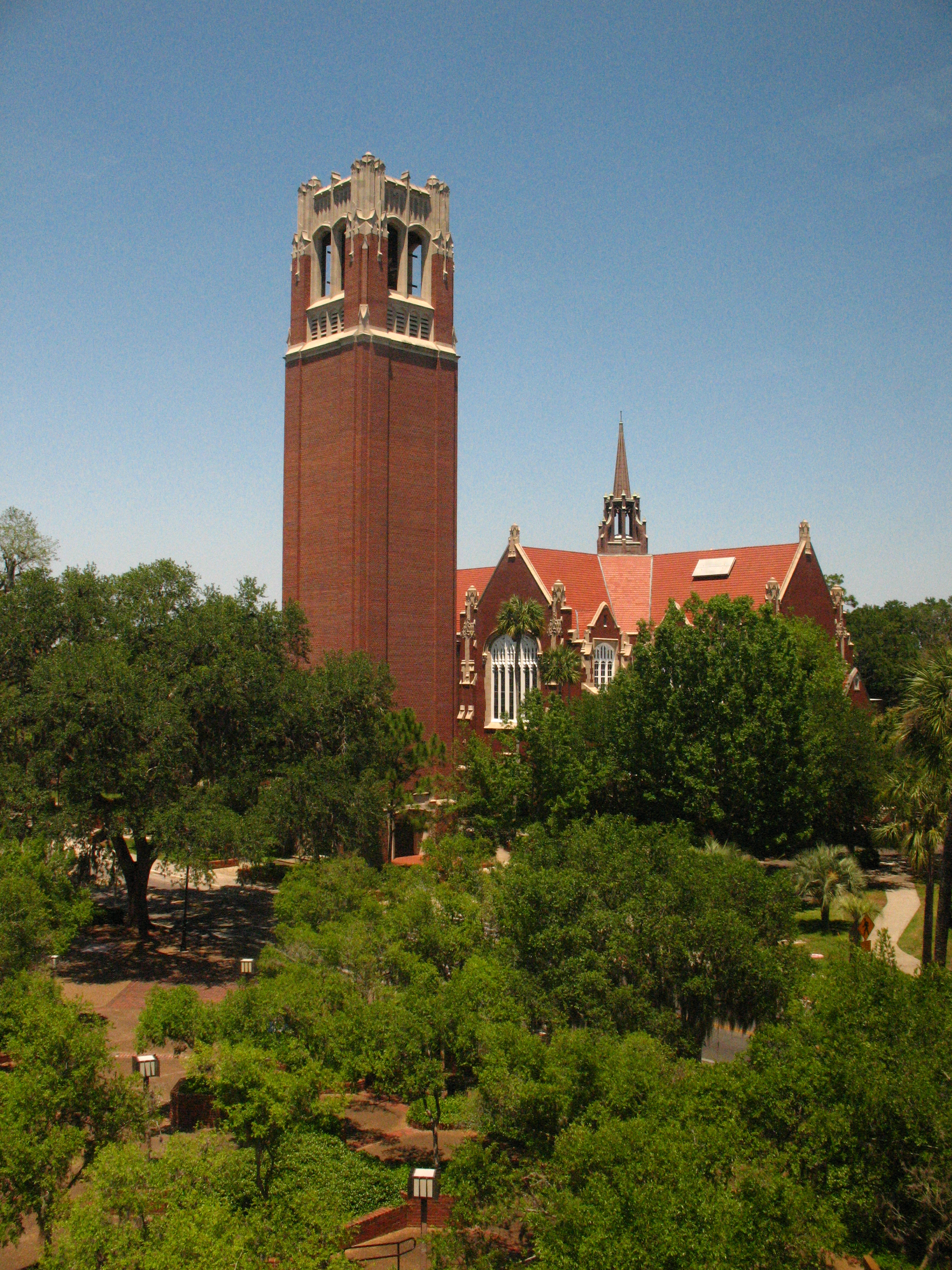
Century Tower, University of Florida

Public schools are operated by the Alachua County Public Schools school district. Gainesville is also home to the University of Florida and Santa Fe College. According to a 2019 study by the university's Institute of Food and Agricultural Sciences, the university contributed $16.9 billion to Florida's economy and was responsible for over 130,000 jobs in the 2017–2018 fiscal year. Its economic contributions include UF athletic events, such as SEC football games.

=== Desegregation ===
Gainesville's schools began desegregating in the 1960s. Its high schools were integrated from 1968 to 1970, with "colored" schools closed or integrated.

=== Elementary schools ===
- Boulware Springs Charter School
- Caroline Beatrice Parker Elementary School
- Chiles Elementary School
- Duval Elementary School
- Expressions Learning Arts Academy
- Foster Elementary School
- Glen Springs Elementary School
- Hidden Oak Elementary School
- Idylwilde Elementary School
- Lake Forest Elementary School
- Littlewood Elementary School
- Meadowbrook Elementary School
- WA Metcalfe Elementary School
- Norton Knights Elementary School
- Rawlings Elementary School
- Talbot Elementary School
- Terwilliger Elementary School
- Wiles Elementary School
- Williams Elementary School

=== Middle schools ===
Middle schools in the county run from 6th to 8th grades.

- Fort Clarke Middle School
- Howard Bishop Middle School
- Kanapaha Middle School
- Lincoln Middle School
- Westwood Middle School

=== High schools ===
High schools in Gainesville run from 9th to 12th grades.

- Buchholz High School
- Eastside High School
- Gainesville High School
- Loften High School

=== Private schools ===
- Brentwood School
- Countryside Christian School
- Cornerstone Academy
- Gainesville Country Day School
- Laniakea Montessori School
- Millhopper Montessori School
- Oak Hall School
- Queen of Peace Academy
- St. Patrick Interparish School
- The Rock School
- Trilogy School of Learning Alternatives
- Westwood Hills Christian School
- St. Francis Academy
- Newberry Christian Community School
- The Frazer School

=== Colleges and universities ===
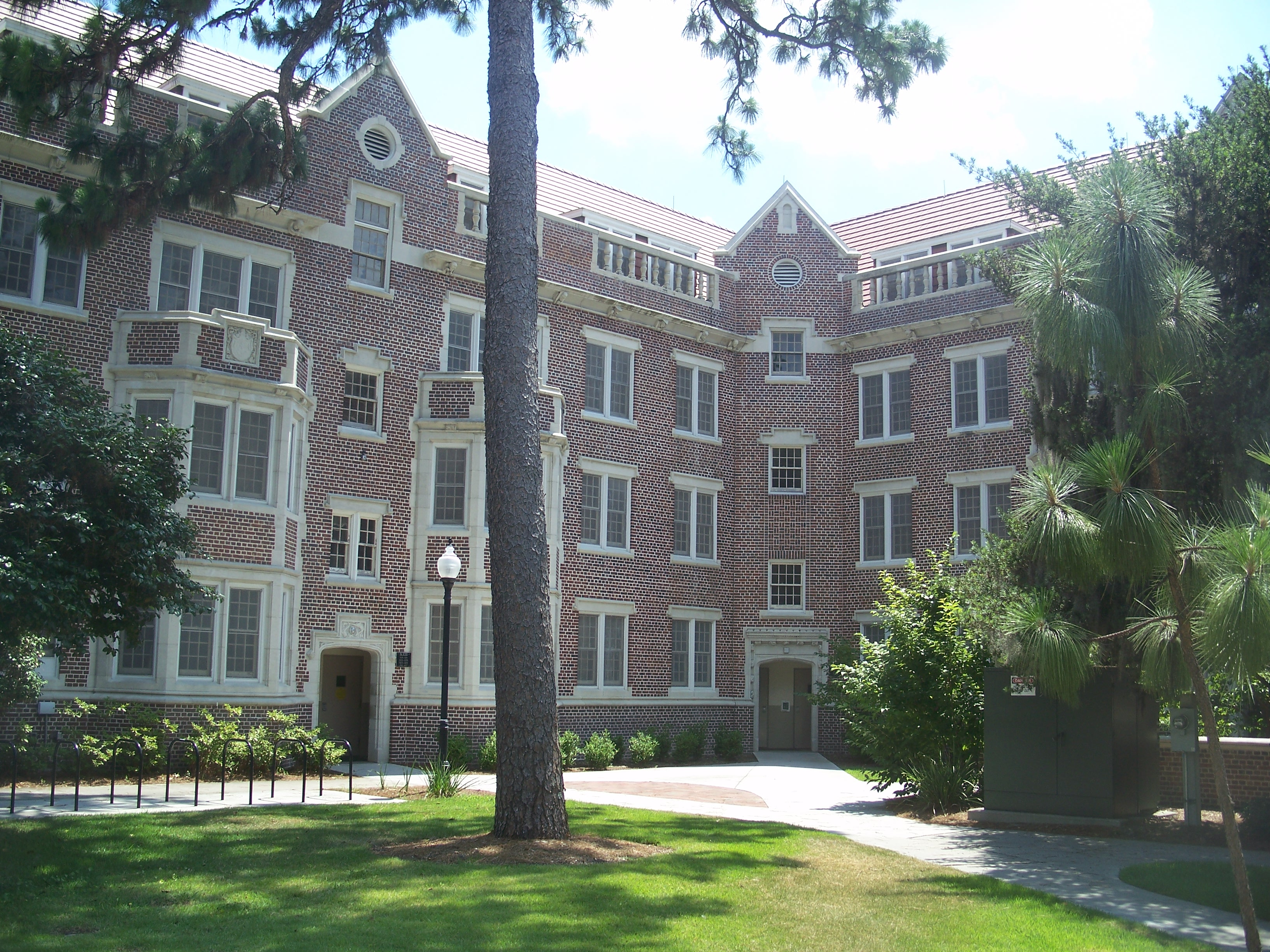
Sledd Hall at the University of Florida

- University of Florida
- Santa Fe College
- Saint Leo University (Gainesville Education Center)
- City College (Gainesville campus)

=== Developmental research schools ===
- P. K. Yonge Developmental Research School

=== Public libraries ===
The Alachua County Library District provides public library service to Gainesville and to all of Alachua County. The Library District has reciprocal borrowing agreements with the surrounding counties of Baker, Bradford, Clay, Columbia, Dixie, Gilchrist, Lafayette, Levy, Marion, Putnam, St. Johns, Taylor, and Union. These agreements are designed to facilitate access to the most convenient library facility regardless of an individual's county of residence.

== Media ==
Independent Florida Alligator Logo

=== Print ===
Gainesville is served by The Gainesville Sun and The Independent Florida Alligator, the student newspaper for the University of Florida and Santa Fe College. In March 2022 two-year-old Mainstreet Daily News announced it would go into print weekly.

The New York Times Editing Center also resides in Gainesville.

=== Radio ===
Arbitron ranks the Gainesville-Ocala market as the nation's 83rd-largest. Thirteen radio stations are licensed to operate in the city of Gainesville—five AM stations, six commercial FM stations, and two low-power non-commercial FM stations. Three of the stations (WRUF, WRUF-FM, and WUFT-FM) are operated by broadcasting students at the University of Florida. WUFT-FM is the city's NPR member station, while the WRUF stations are operated as commercial stations. MARC Radio Group operates six stations in the market.

=== Television ===
Gainesville is the 162nd-largest television market in the nation, as measured by Nielsen Media Research. Broadcast television stations in the Gainesville market include WCJB (ABC, with The CW Plus on DT2), WGFL (CBS, with MyNetworkTV on DT2 and NBC on DT3) from High Springs, WNBW (Roar), WOGX (Fox O&O) from Ocala and WUFT, a PBS member station owned by the University of Florida in Gainesville.

Gainesville has one cable television station called Community 12TV, which is carried on area COX systems. Community 12TV presently airs local government meetings and other public affairs programming as well as content from The Florida Channel.

== Transportation ==
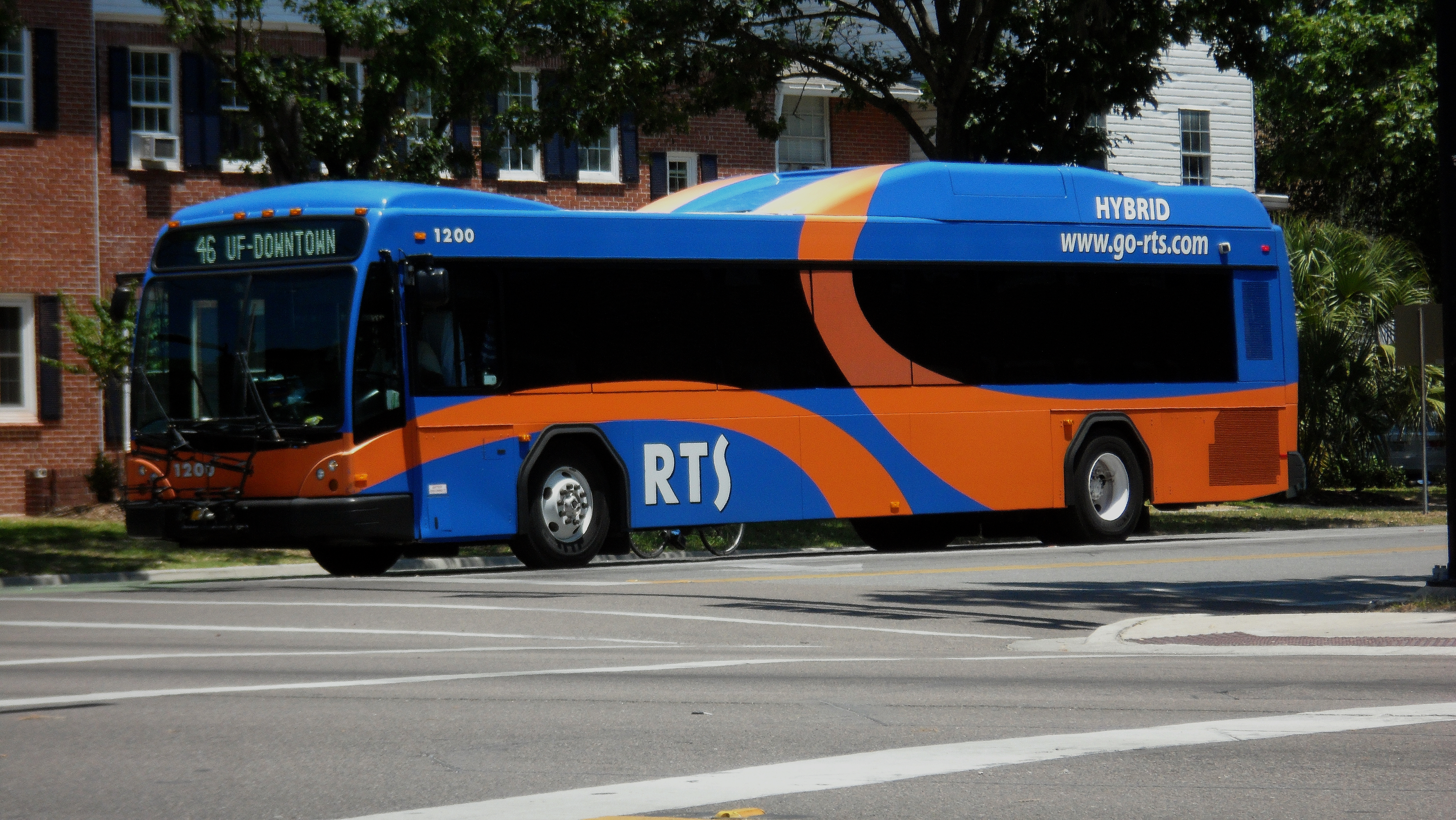
An RTS bus

In 2009, the Gainesville metropolitan statistical area (MSA) ranked seventh highest in the United States in percentage of commuters who biked to work (3.3 percent).

Gainesville is served by Gainesville Regional Transit System (RTS), Florida's fourth-largest mass transit system. The area is also served by Gainesville Regional Airport ("GNV") in the northeast part of the city, with daily service to Atlanta, Charlotte, North Carolina, Dallas-Fort Worth, and Miami.

=== Major roads ===
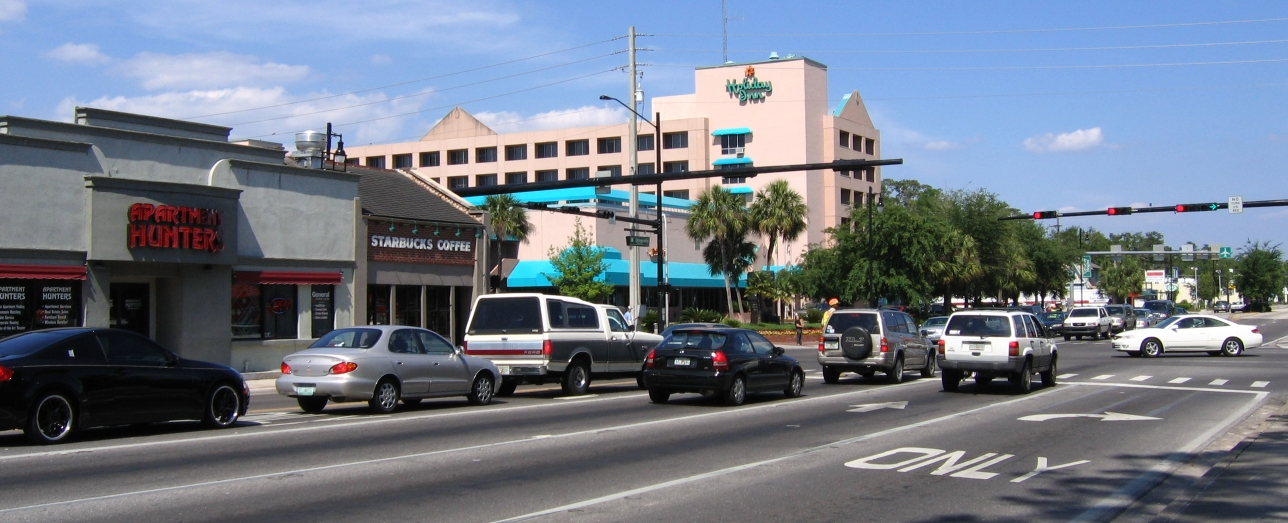
Heading east on University Avenue, approaching 13th Street (US 441) intersection

Gainesville has an extensive road system, which is served by Interstate 75, and several Florida State Routes, including State routes 20, 24, and 26. Gainesville is also served by US 441 and nearby US 301, which give a direct route to Jacksonville, Ocala, and Orlando.

- I-75 runs northwest and southeast across the western edge of the city, with interchanges at SR 121/SR 331 (exit 382), SR 24 (exit 384), SR 26 (exit 387), and SR 222 (Exit 390).
- US 441 is the main local north–south road through Gainesville. It runs on the eastern edge of the University of Florida. It is known to locals as 13th Street, before curving to the northwest and finally joining SR 20, converting into an additional hidden state road. At the intersection of SR 121, the DeSoto Trail moves from SR 121 to US 441.
- SR 20 runs northwest and southeast through Gainesville. In east Gainesville, the road again becomes a stand-alone four-lane highway as it heads to Hawthorne, Interlachen, and Palatka. Northwest of Gainesville, SR 20 coincides with US 441 as a hidden state road through the town of Alachua before splitting at the fork a half-mile from downtown High Springs. SR 20 then coincides with US 27 as it heads to Fort White, Branford, Mayo, Perry, and Tallahassee.
- SR 24 runs northeast and southwest through Gainesville. The northeast corner of SR 24 and SR 222 is the site of the Gainesville Regional Airport, before heading to Waldo, Starke, and Jacksonville (Via.U.S. Route 301)(Gainesville-Jacksonville Highway). Southwest of Gainesville, SR 24 passes through the towns of Archer and Bronson before ending at Cedar Key.
- SR 26 is the main local east–west road through Gainesville. West of the city, it spans from Fanning Springs to Trenton, Newberry, and Jonesville. Eastward, SR 26 heads to Melrose before reaching its terminus at Putnam Hall in Putnam County.
- SR 120 runs east and west through the city. Its western end is at the junction with US 441, its eastern end at the junction with SR 24.
- SR 121 runs north and south on the western part of the city. The DeSoto Trail breaks away as SR 121 heads north to Lake Butler, Raiford, and Macclenny. Southward, it travels to Williston before reaching its terminus at Lebanon Station.
- SR 222 runs east and west on the northern part of the city. Its western end of state maintenance is at the junction with I-75 before continuing as County Road 222 to County Road 241, while its eastern end is at the junction with SR 26 a few miles east of the Gainesville Regional Airport.
- SR 331 runs northeast and southwest through the city. It also serves as a truck route for State Roads 24, 26, and 121. Despite skirting the Gainesville City Limits, SR 331 runs north and south as a four-lane divided rural highway.

The city's streets lie on a grid system, with four quadrants (NW, NE, SW and SE). All streets are numbered, except for a few major thoroughfares, many of which are named for the towns they lead to (such as Waldo Road (SR 24), Hawthorne Road (SR 20), Williston Road (SR 121/SR 331), Archer Road (also SR 24) and Newberry Road (SR 26)). Streets called Avenues, Places, Roads or Lanes (often remembered by use of the acronym "APRiL") generally run east–west, while other streets (including Streets, Drives, Terraces, and Ways) generally run north–south.

=== Railways ===
Amtrak Thruway buses connect with Jacksonville station to the north and Lakeland station to the south. Bus service connects with Amtrak's Silver Service. Amtrak service is available at Palatka, 32 miles (51 km) to the east.

At one time, Gainesville had railroad lines extending in six directions and was served by several depots, one of which, the Seaboard Air Line Depot, survives and has been restored and lies in a city park. The earliest route reached the town in 1859. By 1938, traffic and business patterns changed, Seaboard Air Line Railroad (SAL) had ended its Jacksonville-Waldo-Gainesville-Inverness-Tampa train and its Jacksonville-Waldo-Gainesville-Cedar Key train and the less heavily used railroads were abandoned beginning in 1943. Some routes realigned, with the last trains running in the middle of Main Street in 1948.

Passenger service by the Atlantic Coast Line Railroad (ACL) included: an overnight local train from Jacksonville, due south from Gainesville to Ocala, Clearwater and St. Petersburg and the West Coast Champion from New York City running on the same route during the daytime. Chicago service on the ACL's Dixie Flyer was furnished by a transfer at Jacksonville. In 1967, upon the Seaboard Coast Line Railroad from the merger of ACL and SAL, the overnight local train through Gainesville was terminated. However, by 1968, the Champion was diverted east via a route through Palatka and Orlando. The Jacksonville-Gainesville-Ocala-St. Petersburg route became a local section (SCL #93 south/#94 north). Service into Gainesville ended at the end of April 1971 at Amtrak's creation.

By the 1980s, the only freight operator into the city was the Seaboard System (formerly the Seaboard Coast Line Railroad, now merged into CSX).

== Points of interest ==
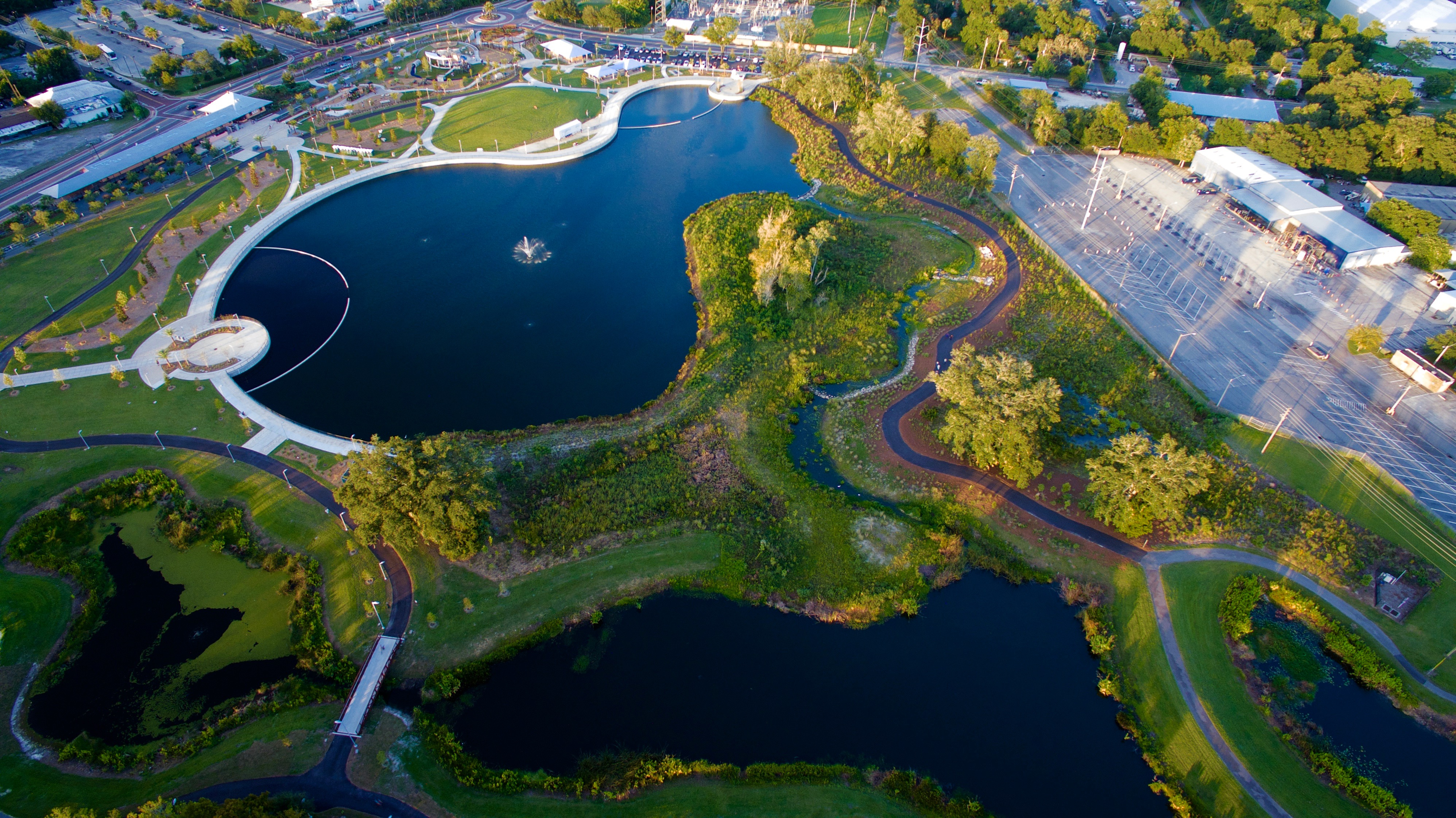
Gainesville's Depot Park

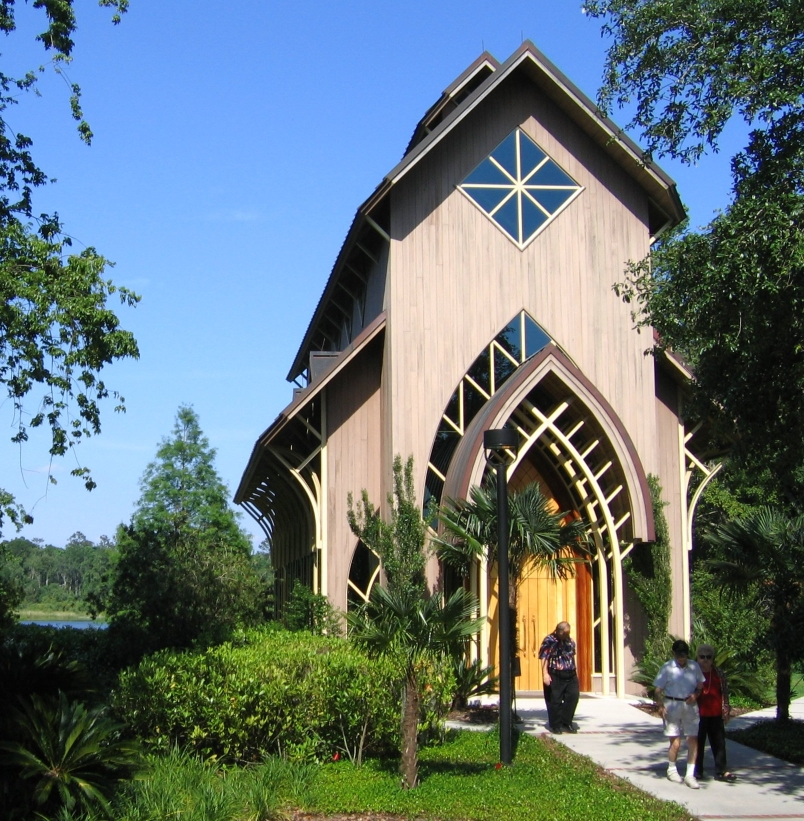
Baughman Center

- 34th Street Wall
- Baughman Center
- Ben Hill Griffin Stadium at Florida Field
- Bivens Arm
- Cade Museum for Creativity and Invention
- Civic Media Center
- Depot Park
- Devil's Millhopper Geological State Park
- Florida Museum of Natural History, including the Butterfly Rainforest exhibit
- Gainesville-Hawthorne Trail State Park
- Harn Museum of Art
- Helyx Bridge
- Hippodrome State Theatre
- Lake Alice
- Morningside Nature Center
- The Oaks Mall
- Stephen C. O'Connell Center
- William Reuben Thomas Center

== Sister cities ==
Gainesville's sister cities are:

- Nizhyn, Ukraine (2024)
- Deir Alla, Jordan
- Duhok, Iraq (2006)
- Jacmel, Haiti
- Kfar Saba, Israel (1998)
- Matagalpa, Nicaragua
- Mejdlaya, Lebanon (2015)
- Novorossiysk, Russia (1982)
- Qalqilya, Palestine
- Rzeszów, Poland (2013)
- Ho, Ghana (2022)

== See also ==
- List of people from Gainesville, Florida
