= Harvest of Hope Fest =

Harvest of Hope Fest was a charity fundraiser and music festival that provided financial support for the Harvest of Hope Foundation which benefits migrant and seasonal farmworkers. The three-day event took place in March 2009 and 2010 at the St. Johns County Fairgrounds in St. Augustine, Florida, United States.

== History ==
The first Harvest of Hope festival was held March 6–8, 2009 in St. Augustine, Florida. The organizers hoped for about 12,000 attendees for the weekend. By the end of the festival, 17,000 people attended the festival. The Harvest of Hope founder, Phillip Kellerman, said that a goal of the foundation is to raise awareness to the huge economic, social and cultural contributions of migrant farmworkers and their families.

The second Harvest of Hope Fest was held March 12–14 in St. Augustine, Florida. It featured the spotlight artist Billy Bragg among other indie artists.

The Harvest of Hope Festival is always held in the spring.

== Artists ==
The 2009 Fest featured amongst others:

1. Against Me!
2. Propagandhi
3. KRS-One
4. Bad Brains
5. The Bouncing Souls
6. Less Than Jake
7. The Gaslight Anthem
8. Kool Keith
9. Tilly and the Wall
10. Bomb the Music Industry!
11. Morningbell
12. Inspectah Deck
13. The National
14. Ra Ra Riot
15. Broken Social Scene
16. Girl Talk
17. Strike Anywhere
18. Ghost Mice
19. This Bike is a Pipe Bomb
20. John Vanderslice

The 2010 Fest featured amongst others:

1. Billy Bragg
2. Anvil
3. Anti-Flag
4. Chali 2na (of Jurassic 5)
5. Stars of Track and Field
6. Andrew Jackson Jihad
7. Rogue Wave
8. Defiance, Ohio
9. The Mountain Goats
10. Kimya Dawson
11. Delta Spirit
12. Senses Fail
