= Theatre Strike Force =

University of Florida comedy troupe

Coordinates: 29.6475°N 82.345°W

Members of Theatre Strike Force pose during their "12 Hours of Improv" philanthropy event, March 2008

Theatre Strike Force is the University of Florida's premier improv and sketch comedy troupe. The group also goes by TSF. The style of improv performed by Theatre Strike Force is a combination long form and short form. They both teach and perform improvisational comedy. They have six house teams which include both forms of improv as well as a sketch team. There are four long form house teams which are cast every semester and usually have six to eight members. The TSF Short Form Team is cast every semester as well and usually has fifteen to nineteen members. TSF Sketch is the final house team and usually has twelve to sixteen members, cast each semester.

The original purpose of Theatre Strike Force is to provide social and political commentary in a thought-provoking and comedic manner. This is achieved through performing improvisational and sketch comedy that is both entertaining and socially engaging. Membership within Theatre Strike Force currently exceeds 60 members. Over time, Theatre Strike Force leaned further from its political roots, moving more towards Chicago style improv and in recent years, UCB style improv.

== History ==
Theatre Strike Force has been a comedic fixture at the University of Florida since 1989. Founded by Dr. Judith Williams and Sid Homan, both of the UF School of Theatre and Dance, the improvisational group initially performed experimental "street theatre" that was satirical in nature.

In the mid 90s, the group came under the direction of Heather Roberts, who fused TSF's social and political consciousness with a more comedy-based style of improvisation. Roberts also created The Sunday Group, the first long form team.

During the mid-1990s, Theatre Strike Force expanded its work beyond campus performances addressing social issues and began incorporating more spontaneous improvisational comedy. The troupe participated in the 1996 and 1997 editions of the Big Stinkin' International Improv & Sketch Comedy Festival in Austin, Texas.

Now, with regular performances for packed audiences and ever-increasing membership, TSF has become one of the largest and most popular collegiate comedy groups in the nation. Although best known for "short-form" improv (popularized on the TV show Whose Line Is It Anyway?), TSF also performs long-form improv and sketch comedy.

== Activities ==
Theatre Strike Force performs weekly on Fridays in events called House Party Shows on the University of Florida campus or in the Gainesville community. TSF has also performed for Dance Marathon and Relay for Life in addition to other charities and student organizations in Gainesville. Theatre Strike Force offers an open and formal course in learning to perform improv through their "Academy".

== Organization ==
=== Academy ===
TSF may function as a performance group, but at its heart is also a training ground for inspiring comedians. Divided into 4 Levels, the Academy offers several different experience levels for aspiring improvisers. Once students have sufficiently learned the techniques in a specific level and feel comfortable proceeding with their training, they are allowed to proceed to the next level. Level 1 covers basic performance techniques, such as support and "Yes, and...", while covering some of the games performed by the TSF Short-Form Team. Level 2 is a short form intensive that drills games TSF frequently plays in shows, practices new games, and experiments with making the games more challenging. Level 3 is the introduction to long form, covering basic forms with an emphasis on strong scenework. Level 4 is the experimental long form group featuring TSF's most experienced players practicing more advanced forms.

Throughout the semester, each Level has four performance dates where they will perform with two other Levels and showcase what they have learned over the course of their class. These shows are an opportunity to invite friends and family to see the progress they've made in their training.

=== Short-Form Team ===
The TSF Short Form team is a way to showcase the best of what short-form improv comedy can be. The players on this audition-based team are the face of TSF. Performances ranging from shows in residence halls and auditoriums on campus to shows at other colleges and festivals are this team's role. These are the best short-form players TSF has to offer and are among the best in the state. The Short-Form Team is currently directed by Shalec Grears.

=== Sunday Group ===
The Sunday Group is an elite troupe of improvisers that performs long-form improv. They represent the best Strike Force has to offer. The Sunday Group performs at a wide range of events including shows on campus, at local bars, and a medley of shows at Gainesville's prestigious Hippodrome State Theatre. The Sunday Group has gained acceptance to various improv festivals, including the Chicago, Miami, Blackbox, and Dirty South Festivals. They also perform regularly in the Gainesville Improv Festival.

The Sunday Group has also competed in a number of improv tournaments. In November 2009, the Sunday Group (competing under the name of its parent organization, Theatre Strike Force) won the Southeast regional tournament in the College Improv Tournament, sponsored by the Chicago Improv Festival. They competed in the semi-finals on February 10, 2010, but lost to The Titanic Players from Northwestern University, who went on to win their second CIT title in three years. In both 2018 and 2019, they won the South regional tournament in Atlanta and were finalists at the national tournament in Chicago.

=== Delta Group ===
Created in January 2009, the Delta Group is the intermediate long-form team of TSF. Most members have been studying and performing improv for at least a year. The Delta Group is TSF's experimental team, playing with both organic, Chicago-style improv and fast-paced, New York-style improv. The Delta Group is currently directed by Matthew Morrow.

=== Apprentice Group ===
The Apprentice Group, or "A.G.", is the beginner's long form team within TSF. It is geared mainly towards students who have little to no experience with long form improv and serves to teach the basics of improv through introductory forms. Almost everyone that has ever been in the Sunday Group has learned their craft in the Apprentice Group. Specializing in their own quick-paced style of long-form, the Apprentice Group performs both with Theatre Strike Force's other house teams and on their own. The Apprentice Group is currently directed by Aimee Sinclair.

=== TSF Sketch ===
Founded January 2008, TSF Sketch is a team of comedy writers that meets weekly to collaborate in developing ideas and writing sketches. Their mission is to provide Theatre Strike Force with a flow of sketches to use to entertain audiences in the local Gainesville community and beyond. TSF Sketch is not currently active.
