= Southeast Gainesville Residential District =

Historic district in Florida, United States

- U.S. National Register of Historic Places
- U.S. Historic district
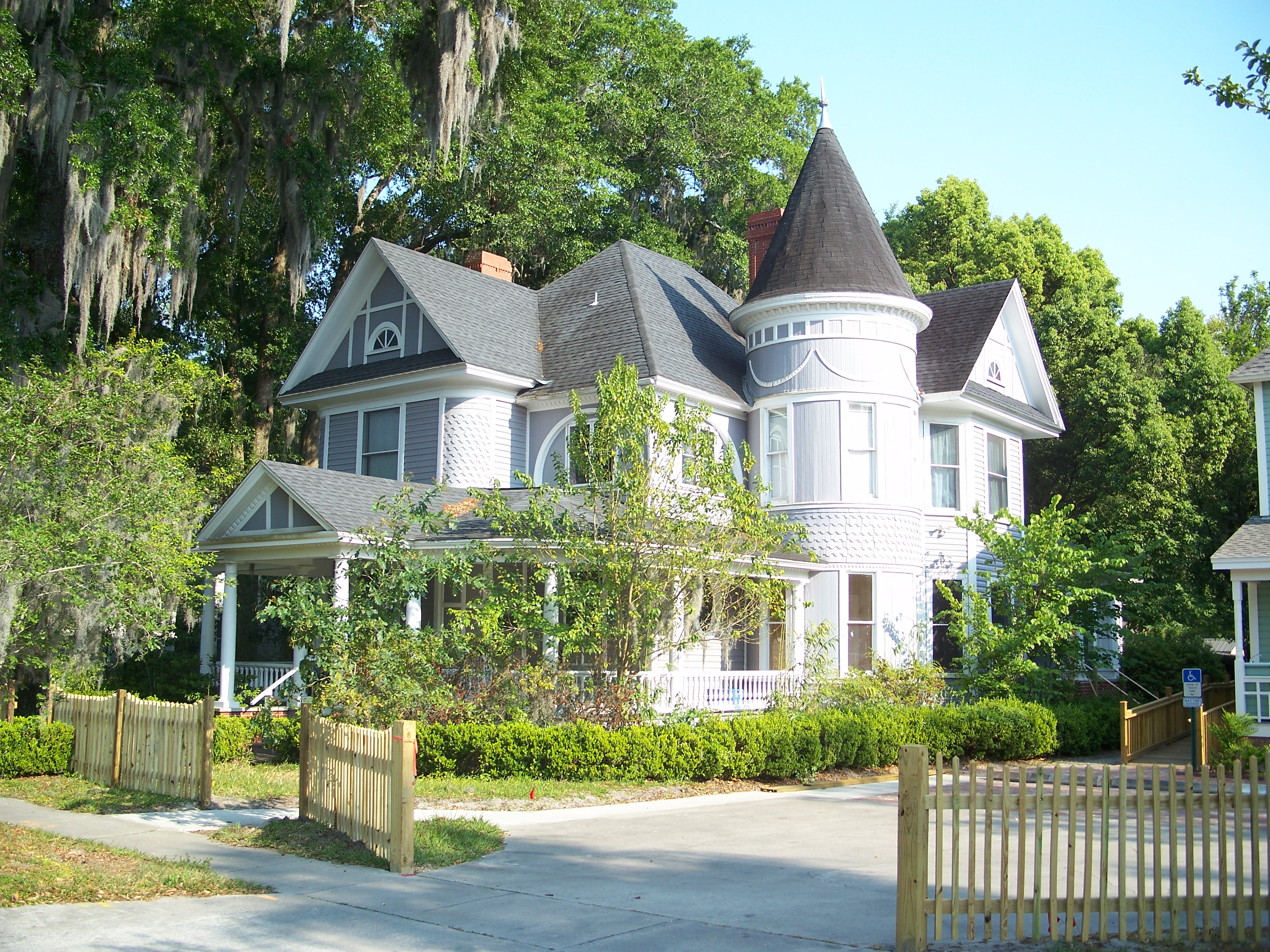
- House in the district

- Location within Florida Location within the United States
- Location: Gainesville, Florida
- Coordinates: 29°38′57″N 82°19′4″W
- Area: 335 acres (1.36 km^{2})
- NRHP reference No.: 87002435
- Added to NRHP: January 14, 1988

The Southeast Gainesville Residential District is a U.S. historic district (designated as such on January 14, 1988) located in Gainesville, Florida. It encompasses approximately 335 acres (1.36 km^{2}), bounded by East University Avenue, Southeast Ninth Street, Southeast Fifth Avenue, and Sweetwater Branch. It contains 94 historic buildings.
