= Masonic Temple (Gainesville, Florida) =

- Gainesville Masonic Lodge No. 41
- U.S. National Register of Historic Places
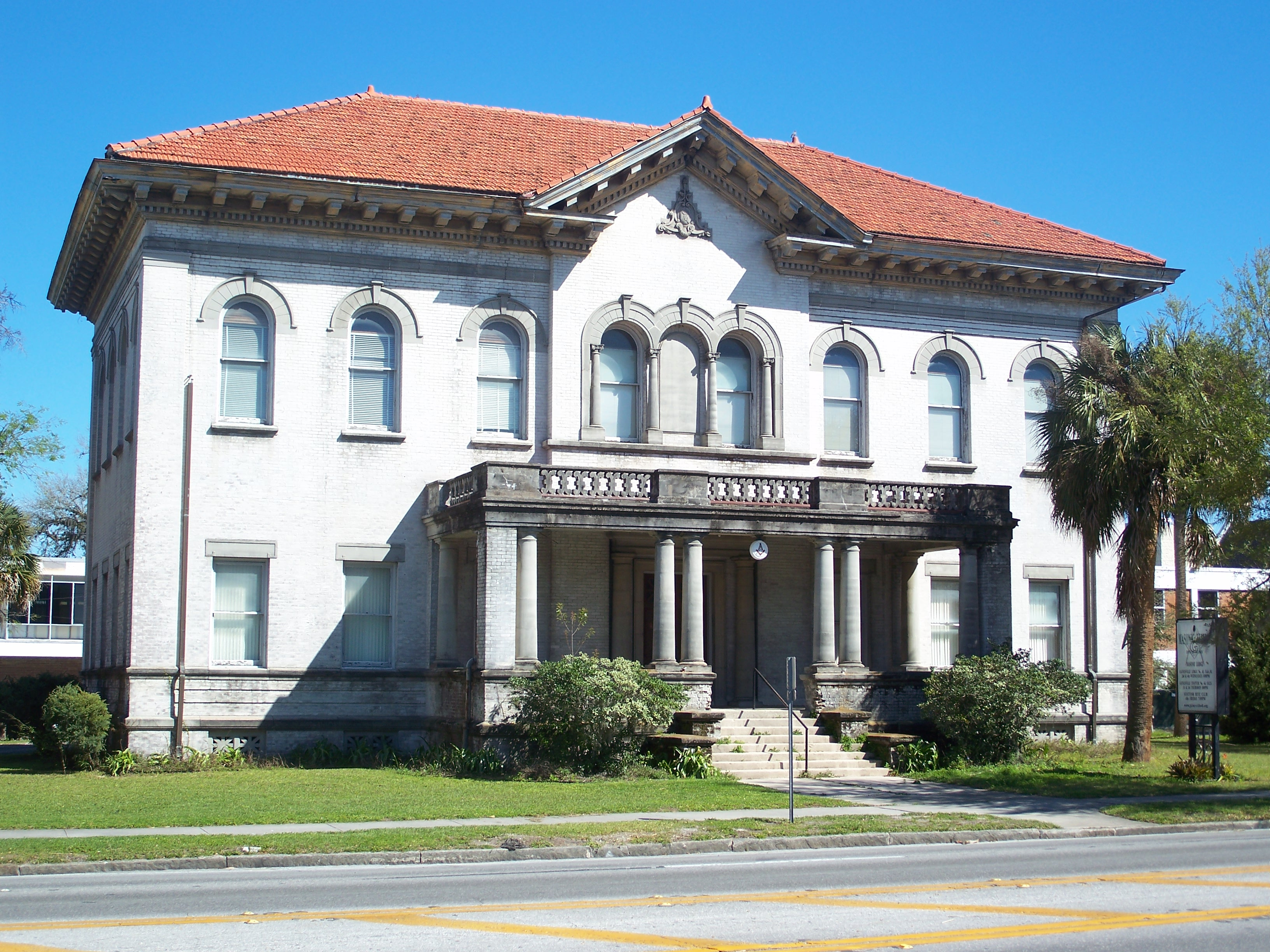

- Location within Florida Location within the United States
- Location: Gainesville, Alachua County, Florida, USA
- Coordinates: 29°39′12″N 82°19′30″W
- Architectural style: Late 19th And 20th Century Revivals
- NRHP reference No.: 98000589
- Added to NRHP: May 29, 1998

Gainesville Masonic Lodge No. 41 in Gainesville, Florida is a historic Masonic building, located at 215 North Main Street. It was constructed by Gainesville Masonic Lodge No. 41 in 1908. On May 29, 1998, it was added to the U.S. National Register of Historic Places.

== Origins ==
In 1857, twelve years after Florida became a state, a group of eighteen Gainesville Masons petitioned for and obtained a charter from the Grand Lodge of Florida, which at that time maintained headquarters in Tallahassee. Conditions of that time were very different and crude compared to modern standards. However, the circumstances and mode of living of that period created the urge for Masonry in Gainesville.

== The First Century 1857-1957 ==
=== Early Years: 1857-1876 ===
Not much is known about the first two decades of Gainesville 41. The official charter of the lodge was approved and issued on January 15, 1857. The first meeting of which there are any records was not held until April 15, 1857. The main concern of the first few meetings were to provide proper books and furniture for the young lodge. However, the lodge began to grow quickly by receiving four petitions for membership by the second meeting.

Not much is known about the lodge's activities during the Civil War and Reconstruction era, however the minutes of the Grand Lodge of Florida indicate that the lodge was represented in the Grand Communication and had paid its annual dues to the Grand Lodge of Florida.

=== Growth: 1876-1908 ===
It was during this period that Gainesville Lodge No. 41 received petitions of membership from many quality Masons that became prominent members within the Fraternity. The most important being that of Marcus Endel, who after his entrance in 1875 went on to become Master of the lodge in 1878 and was twice re-elected to sit in that seat. In 1881 he went on to being elected the Senior Grand Warden of the Grand Lodge of Florida and served in that office for 3 years until he was elected as Deputy Grand Master for 1892, and finally in 1893, he became the first member of this lodge to become the Grand Master of the Grand Lodge of Florida.

In 1896, a committee as appointed to make arrangements to erect a building on a vacant lot to be used as a picture gallery. The plans were that contributions were to be solicited from the members with repayment to be made from the rents collected, and after such payment had been made, the building was to become the property of the Lodge. This plan however ended when the lot was sold to the City of Gainesville on December 24, 1902. A new lot was purchased as a result from the Episcopal Church on the corner of North Main Street and NE 3rd Avenue. Acting on authority of the articles of incorporation, the Lodge authorized a sum of money for the purpose of erecting and furnishing a building. After much effort, enough funds were in hand to begin work on September 9, 1908. With R. T. Schaffer as Master of the Lodge (the man whom the second Masonic Lodge in Gainesville is named after), the cornerstone of this present building was laid.

By virtue of the principles of Masonry, this Lodge has also been greatly instrumental in laying the cornerstones of many buildings in this city, including but not limited to: East Florida Seminary (May 30, 1883), Gainesville Courthouse (January 14, 1885), Kavanaugh Memorial Church (December 6, 1886), First Baptist Church (April 1896), and University of Florida Auditorium (April 21, 1922).

=== Age:1909-1957 ===
During the days of World War I much of the meetings were done short of time on authority of special dispensations given by the Grand Master. During the latter part of 1918, meetings were suspended for a period of two months by order of the health board on account of the epidemic of influenza.

On May 24, 1922, Florida Chapter of the Order of DeMolay was installed in this city and was sponsored by this Lodge.

In 1936, with Earl V. Simpson as Master of the Lodge, a ceremony was started which now holds great traditional sentiment in this lodge: The Past Masters' Chain. During this ceremony, the Master of the Lodge hammers a link engraved with his initials and year as Master, into the chain of Past Masters. The chain currently holds 77 links and is hung behind the Master's chair.

== Laying of the Cornerstone ==
The cornerstone for the Lodge as officially laid on the afternoon of Wednesday, September 9, 1908. The Gainesville Elevator, reporting on the occasion, stated that "the afternoon was virtually a holiday for the entire city…for the laying of the cornerstone in the new Masonic Temple on West Main Street, in the presence of every secret order, military organization, city officials, war veterans and a concourse of citizens so numerous as to fill the adjoining streets. The Masonic Grand Lodge was largely present and one of the important features of the occasion was a most beautiful and, of course, appropriate address by the Rev. W. J. Carpenter, formerly pastor of the Methodist Church in this city. The long procession formed on West Liberty Street (University Ave.) and the adjoining streets beginning at 3:30 p.m. took up the line of march along Liberty, across North side of the square. Led by the Gainesville Military Band with the company of Guards in full dress and equipment following, the long procession of societies and officials was an imposing sight, one not to be soon forgotten by those who filled the streets by hundreds and occupied every available place of observation around the Temple. Reaching the place where the to be beautiful Masonic Temple will soon stand as an object of enterprise on the part of the local Lodge and an honor to the city, the Grand Lodge officers took charge of the proceedings and with the impressive ceremony for such occasions proceeded to place the cornerstone of the building in position."

Items placed in the receptacle were reported as follows:

• One copy each of the 1908 Proceedings of the Grand Lodge, Grand Chapter, and the Grand Commandery of Florida

• Roster of Gainesville Lodge No. 41 F.& A. M. 108 Members

• Roster of Gainesville Chapter No. 2 R. A. M. 95 Members

• Roster of Pilgrim Comandery No. 7 K. T. 79 Members

• By-laws of Center Lodge No. 11 I.O.O.F.

• By-laws of Mt. Vernon Lodge No. 20 K. of P.

• By-laws of Lodge No. 990 B.P.O.E.

• One dollar script (Florida) by J.I. Blake

• Several old coins by R.T. Schaffer

• One hundred dollars (Confederate) by Robert McClellan

• Copy of the Gainesville Daily Sun

• Copy of the Gainesville Elevator

• Photo of William Howard Taft by J.M. Dell

• Photo of the Baptist Church by Miss Sallie McClellan

• Roster of Lew Walace Post No. 25 G.A.R.

The Gainesville Elevator states further that these items "in years to come, will, if ever the stone be opened, prove very readable mementoes to the future generations of people who will be citizens of Gainesville when she becomes a city of fifty or a hundred thousand."

== Making a Mason at Sight ==
On July 11, 1944, a regular petition for Degrees of Freemasonry was received from Dr. John J. Tigert, the President of the University of Florida. The petition took its regular course and on August 8, 1944, the ballot as spread and he was declared elected. After the announcement was made, Grand Master Warren S. Taylor, a member and Past Master of Gainesville Lodge No. 41, arrested the progress of the petitioner for the purpose of making him a Mason at sight. This was in keeping with Masonic law and the Grand Master's prerogatives after the candidate had stood the test of the ballot. It was intended that the ceremony be held at the 1945 Grand Lodge session, but because no Grand Communication could be held that year on account of war-time travel restrictions, it was postponed until a year later.

Because of the important position held by Dr. Tigert, Grand Master Taylor wished to confer the ceremony before a Grand Lodge assembly. However, after careful study, it was decided that such an event should be held in the Lodge in which the candidate had been regularly elected.

== Masonic Service Center ==
During the troubled times of World War II, Gainesville Lodge No. 41 earned its own service stripe for meritorious duty. For 77 consecutive weeks this Lodge was used as a free dormitory and breakfast room for servicemen stationed in the surrounding area. To the best known facts, Gainesville Lodge as the only Masonic organization in the country offering a completely free service of this kind. With so many men stationed in nearby camps and coming into Gainesville for the weekends, local hotel facilities were taxed beyond their capacities. Sunday morning would find men sleeping on the courthouse lawn.

On the weekend of May 27, 1944, the dormitory opened with a registration of 45 men. This was only the beginning. As soon as the word spread, registration began mounting. A high of 276 men spending a Saturday night was reached. When the dormitory opened, Miss Mary Laura Johnson of Gainesville felt that Southern hospitality demanded something more than a bed for guests. She began by buying, preparing and serving breakfast to the men who had spent the previous night there. She was able to do this for a short time, but rapid increase in the number of guests soon made these Sunday breakfasts impossible both financially and physically for one person. Without any solicitation, contributions began to come in from local people who knew of the work she was doing. She was able to assemble a "kitchen crew" that served for the balance of the 77 weeks that the service center was in operation. The breakfast consisted of hot cakes, bacon or sausage and coffee.
