= Morningbell =

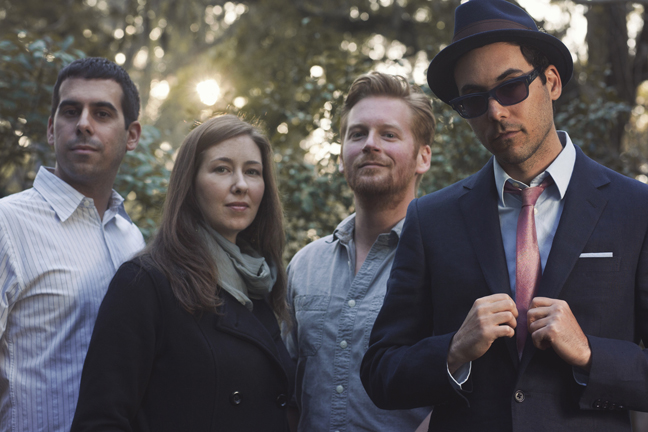
- From left to right: Eric Atria, Stacie Atria, Chris Hillman, Travis Atria

Background information
- Origin: Gainesville, Florida, US
- Genres: Psychedelic rock
- Years active: 2000 – present
- Members: Travis Atria : Lead vocals, guitar percussion Eric Atria : Bass guitar, theremin Stacie Atria: Keyboard Percussion Samples; Chris Hillman : Drums
- Website: morningbellonline.com

Morningbell is a psychedelic rock band based in Gainesville, Florida. The band was formed in 2000 by brothers Travis Atria (vocals, guitar, lyricist) and Eric Atria (bass guitar, theremin, backing vocals). Stacie Thrushman/Atria (keyboard) joined the band in late 2001, while Chris Hillman (drums) was recruited in 2007 as the band's 6th drummer.

== History ==
In 2000, brothers Eric and Travis Atria decided to form a band while attending the University of Miami. The two sought out Devon Bergman on drums and Chris Hallman on keyboards. Initially started under the name "Jerry Walks the Plank," the band quickly changed to "Future Feels Good" (a reference from explodingdog.com). The band played regularly around the Miami area, yet after a year parted ways with Bergman and Hallman who went on to pursue other projects. They were replaced by Masatoshi Enomoto on drums and Stacie Thrushman on keyboards.

Dissatisfied with the Miami music scene, the band relocated to Gainesville in 2003 and began work in earnest. After growing tired of being asked to repeat the band name or if the band played Christian rock, the band changed their name to "Morningbell", inspired by Radiohead's Kid A album, a favorite of the members.

== Live performances ==
From 2004 to present, Morningbell has toured the United States, establishing themselves, in the words of Allmusic.com as "a hot live act." Recent tours have included sets at Bonnaroo and South by Southwest.

== Discography ==
- Learning by Musical Montage (2004)
- Forgetting To Wake Up (2005)
- Monkeys to Men-B sides and rarities (2006)
- Through the Belly of the Sea (2007)
- Sincerely, Severely (2009)
- We Are Angular And Beautiful-EP (2010)
- Basso Profundo (2011)
- Basso Profundo EP (2011)
- Bôa Noite (2013)

== Album detail ==
The band has self released 6 full-length albums and three EP's.

"Learning By Musical Montage" garnered regional acclaim and was ranked the third best Gainesville album of 2004 by gainesvillebands.com.

2005's "Forgetting To Wake Up" also ranked in the top 10 albums according to the Gainesville Sun and charted on several national independent/college radio stations, peaking at #1 on WBUL Tampa.

"Monkeys to Men" was released in 2006 as a B-Sides and Rarities collection.

2007's "Through the Belly of the Sea" (self described as the world's first choose your own adventure album) was released to international acclaim. A selection from the album was used by MTV's The Real World Sydney and following the pace set by "Forgetting," the album charted nationally.

2009's "Sincerely, Severely" was also released to international acclaim, including a 4 star rating from All Music Guide 6 songs from the album were selected by GQ for use on their website The album is the band's longest album to date.

2010's "We Are Angular And Beautiful" is an EP containing six songs recorded during the Sincerely, Severely sessions. It is available for download on the band's website.

2011's "Basso Profundo" was released digitally and on USB format only. The bonus EP is available through the hard copy USB format only.

2013's "Bôa Noite" is the band's most ambitious effort, featuring many songs with full classical orchestration. The album was early-released complete with a custom space show at the Kika Silva Pla Planetarium in Gainesville, FL. The album is scheduled for full release on May 21, 2013.

== Former members ==
Devon Bergman – drums (2001)
Chris Hillman – keyboards (2001)
Masatoshi Enomoto – drums (2001–2005)
Evan Mitchell – drums (2005–2006)
Jake McMullen – drums (2006–2007)
Evan Garfield – drums (2007)
