= Harvest of Hope Foundation =

American nonprofit organization

- The Harvest of Hope Foundation Logo
- Formation: 1997
- Legal status: 501(c)(3) Foundation
- Purpose: Humanitarianism
- Headquarters: Gainesville, Florida, U.S.
- Region served: United States
- President: Phil Kellerman
- Website: www.harvestofhope.net

The Harvest of Hope Foundation is a 501(c)(3) non-profit foundation which provides emergency and educational financial relief to migrant farmworkers and their families.

== History ==
Although the Harvest of Hope Foundation is currently based out of Gainesville, Florida, it was founded by Philip Kellerman in 1997 in Oneonta, New York. The foundation was established through an inheritance from Kellerman's grandmother, Dr. Helen Zand (1901–1995) – the first woman accepted to the law school of Cornell University and a long time social worker. In honor and memory of his grandmother, Kellerman wanted to continue the tradition of social service work by forming the foundation in order to assist mobile field laborers of fruits, vegetables and other foods.

In the field of migrant education, the words "harvesting" and "harvesting hope" are used frequently for those who advocate for the educational, social and health needs of migrant workers.

== Organization ==
The Harvest of Hope Foundation is a non-profit 501(c)(3) foundation which is tax exempt as defined under the IRS guidelines. It is composed of a board of directors with over 100 combined years in migrant education and human services.

== Function ==
The Harvest of Hope Foundation provides humanitarian support and emergency financial assistance to migrant farmworkers and their families. Funds are provided for things such as automobile breakdowns, utility shutoffs, rent payments, medical situations and funeral expenses. The Harvest of Hope Foundation also issues grants to small businesses and organizations that provide social services and assistance to migrant farmworkers. The Harvest of Hope Foundation provides educational scholarships to children of migrant farmworkers to attend college or other post-secondary education. The Foundation also houses and manages 42 funds on behalf of migrant farmworkers and families. The Foundation President, Philip Kellerman, conducts regular meetings and workshops throughout the country with educators, migrant advocates and state officials who are involved with social services to migrants.

Since its establishment, The Harvest of Hope Foundation has distributed more than $812,000 in emergency and educational financial aid to migrant farmworkers. Eighty cents of every donated dollar goes to provide direct emergency and educational aid. Ten to twelve cents of every dollar is used for administrative expenses. Eight cents of every dollar goes to the foundation's president. Because the Harvest of Hope Foundation receives more requests for aid than funds allow, the foundation has strict procedures for the distribution of funds. Individuals who request aid must show that they are willing to help themselves. The foundation works closely with teachers, social workers and advocates of migrant workers to coordinate the services and the distribution of money. Payments are typically made to landlords, mechanics, funeral homes and other service providers, and usually not to the individuals in need.
