= Hippodrome State Theatre =

- U.S. Post Office and Courthouse — Gainesville
- U.S. National Register of Historic Places
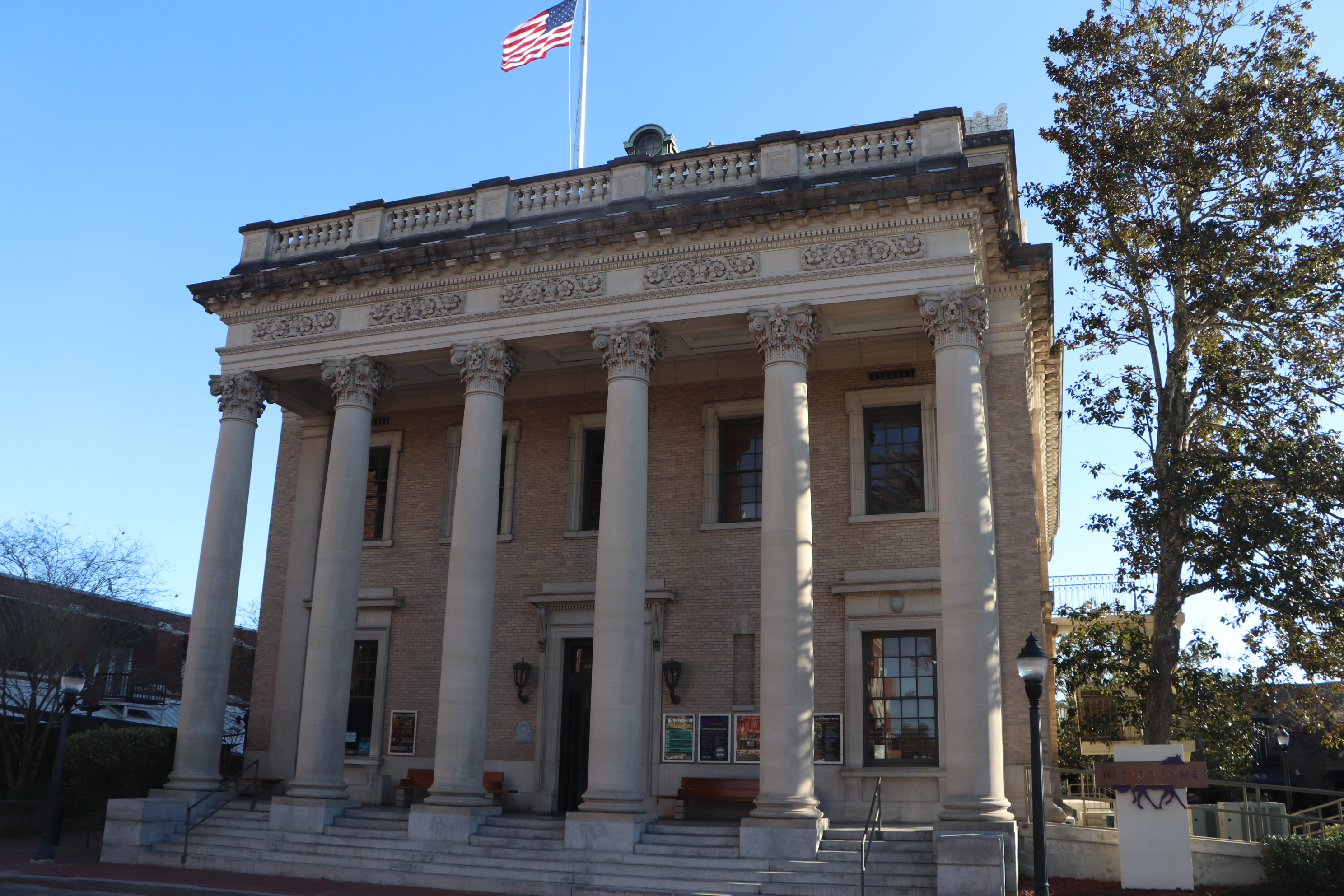

- Location within Florida Location within the United States
- Location: 25 Southeast 2nd Place, Gainesville, Florida
- Coordinates: 29°38′57″N 82°19′27″W
- Built: 1911
- Architect: John Young, James Knox Taylor
- Architectural style: Beaux Arts
- Website: thehipp.org
- NRHP reference No.: 79000659
- Added to NRHP: July 10, 1979

The Hippodrome Theatre (locally known as The Hippodrome or The Hipp) is a regional professional theatre in downtown Gainesville, Florida, United States. It was founded in 1973 by local actors and was added to the U.S. National Register of Historic Places on July 10, 1979.

== History ==
=== U.S. Post Office and District Courthouse ===
The building itself was completed in 1911, and served as a U.S. Post Office (on the first floor) and a Courthouse of the United States District Court for the Northern District of Florida (on the second floor).

== Structure ==
=== Interior design ===
The present-day interior maintains much of the original walls, doors and beams from its post office and courthouse era.

=== Historic hand-operated elevator ===
The Hippodrome building also has one of the oldest working elevators in Florida which requires the operator to manually close the screen, the door, and then pull a crank to operate.

The elevator was temporarily taken out of service in January 2024 after an inspection revealed issues with its braking system.

After a year of planning, restoration of the elevator began in February 2025. The renovations are estimated to cost $135,799 and are being funded by Alachua County's Wild Spaces & Public Places half-cent sales tax. They include the repair of damaged components and fabrication of new parts.

=== Modern renovations ===
In 2013, due to the imminent discontinuation of 35 mm movie film, the theater used a combination of grant funding and a Kickstarter project to help fund its transition to digital projectors, which it estimated to cost $40,000.

The theater received a series of renovations in 2020, which included lobby improvements, better indoor and outdoor lighting, new speakers, and improved air conditioning. These renovations cost the theater over $324,000 and were partially funded by Wild Spaces & Public Places, a 2016 Alachua County tax initiate.

== Operations ==
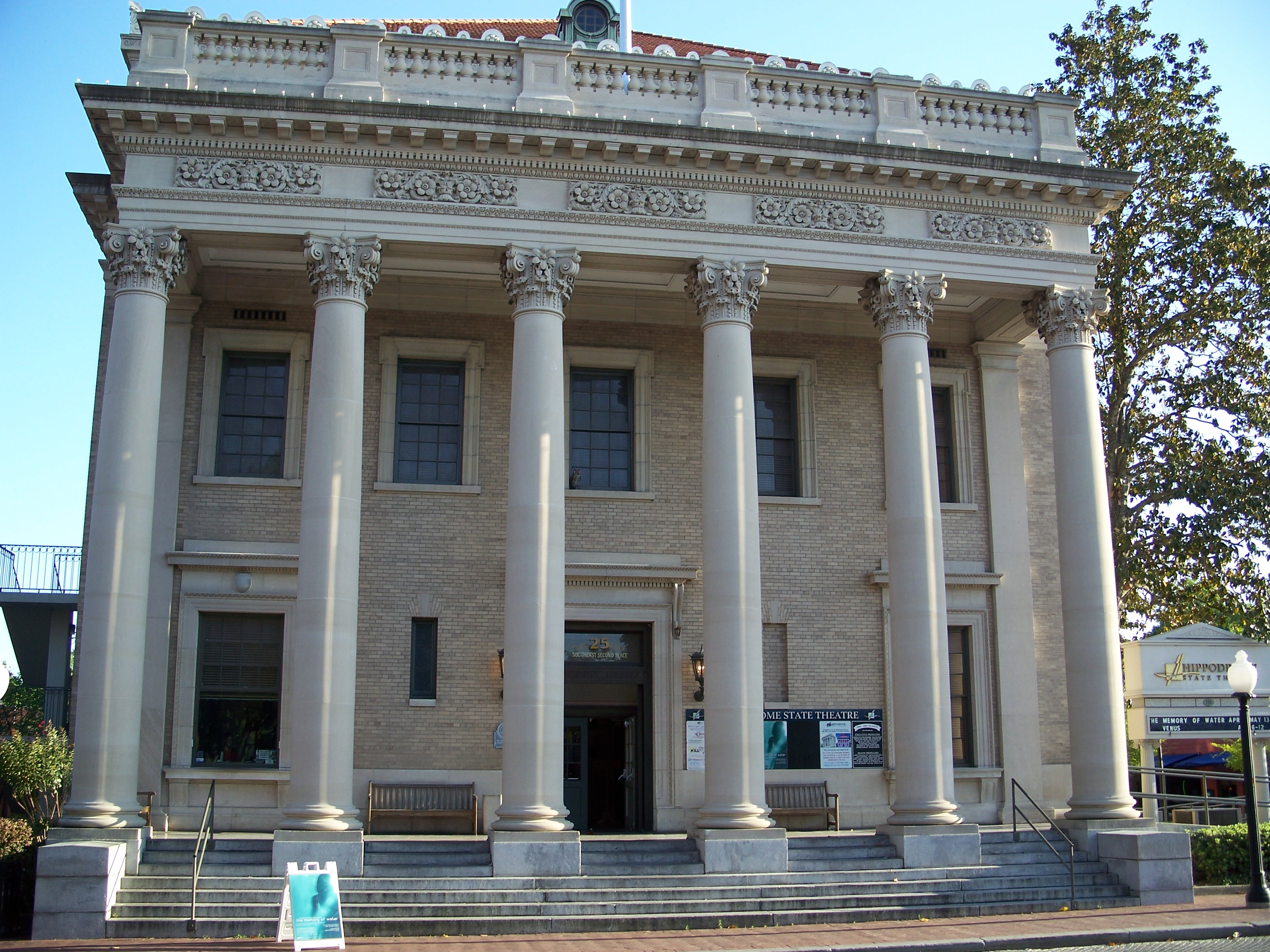
The front of the Hippodrome (April 2007)

The Hippodrome uses professional actors and has its own set designers, costume designers, sound engineers and lighting engineers for each of its main stage productions. It also provides youth theater education classes. The Hippodrome features Broadway and off Broadway productions and art house films.

The Hippodrome provides arts education for all ages, including classes & camps, in-school programs, workshops and behind-the-scenes opportunities for adults.

It is a relatively small location, with a 268-seat thrust stage main stage theater on the second floor and 80-seat cinema space on the first floor.
