= History of Gainesville, Florida =

History of city in Florida, USA

The city of Gainesville, Florida, USA, was incorporated in 1869.

== Native American, Pre-European ==
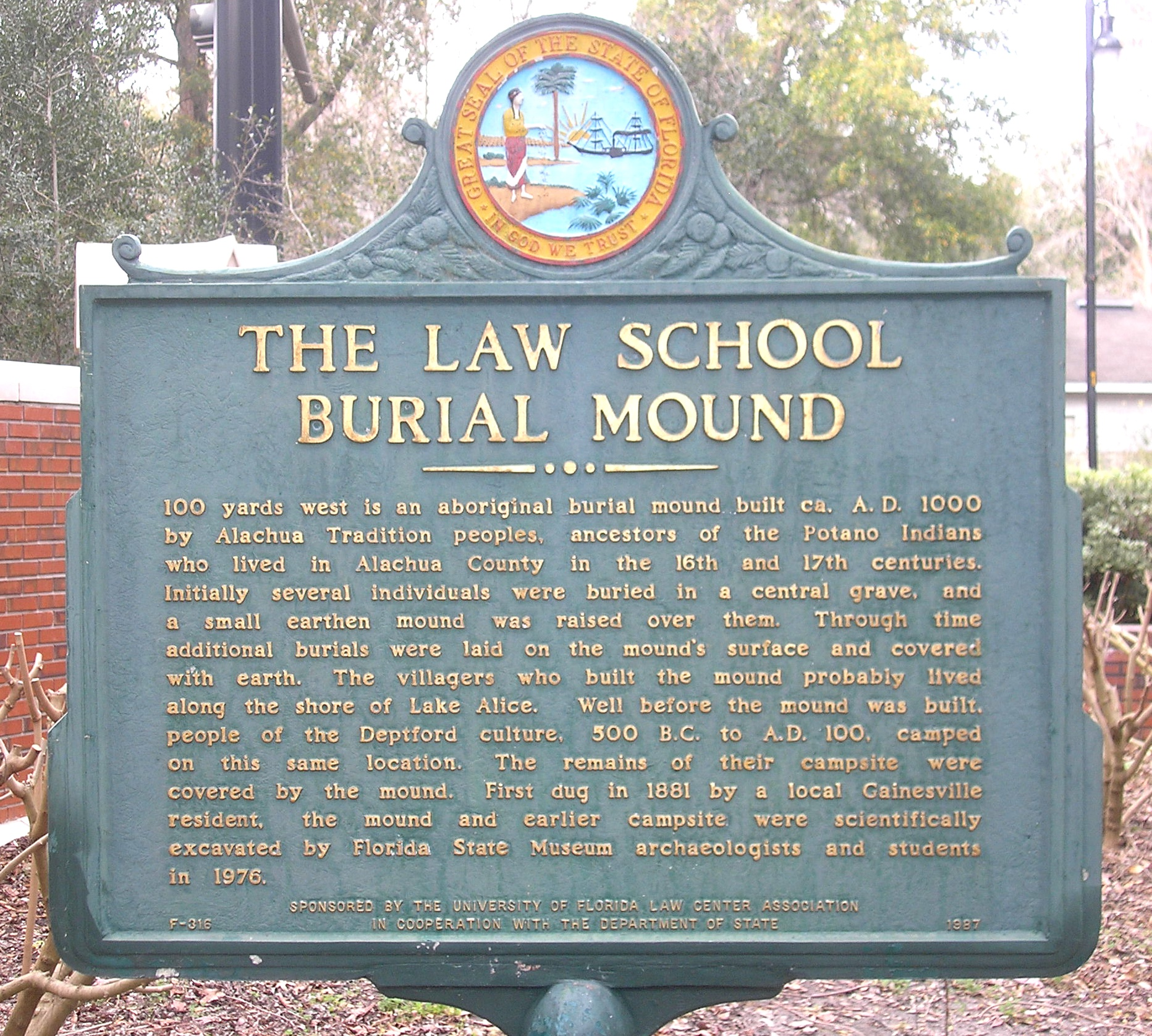
Historical marker on the University of Florida campus

About 12,000 years ago Paleo-Indians lived in Florida, but fewer than 100 sites have been found. Although it is not known for certain whether any permanent settlements from that period were in the present city limits of Gainesville, archaeological evidence of human presence exists. With the end of the ice age to the north, sea levels rose so that coastal Florida became inundated and Florida's land mass shrank while the southeastern United States became wetter than it had been. Paleo-Indians then required fewer moves between water spots and more populous camps inhabited for longer periods of time emerged. Among the spots where camps from this later period have been found is around Paynes Prairie, very close to Gainesville.

Eventually more complex social organization and agricultural practices emerged into what archaeologists classify as the Deptford culture (2500–100 BC). A Deptford culture campsite has been excavated beneath the subsequent Alachua culture "Law School Burial Mound" on the grounds of the University of Florida. Around the 1st century AD, Deptford people began moving into the environs of Gainesville to take advantage of wetlands in the environs of Paynes Prairie and northern Orange Lake, becoming the Cades Pond culture.

In the 7th century the Deptford people were displaced by migrants thought to be from the Ocmulgee culture of the river valleys of southern Georgia, dubbed the Alachua culture since most of their villages have been found in present-day Alachua County. The UF campus burial mound was built about 1000 A.D. by Alachua culture inhabitants who probably lived along the shore of Lake Alice.

Alachua culture villages budded off to form clusters connected by a series of forest trails, many of which are still in use as paved roads; among these clusters are some in the present city limits of Gainesville near the Devil's Millhopper and near Moon Lake (the eastern shore of which is 0.4 miles (0.64 km) from the city limits (Note: Moon Lake: 29.681165,-82.404317; City limits nearest point: 29.679683,-82.395294; Using "Great-circle distance between two points", the distance is 2,032 feet (619 m))) as well as northwest of and north-central of Paynes Prairie, and west of Newnans Lake.

In the recorded period, the region was home to the Potano, a Timucua chiefdom descended from Alachua culture people (the town of Potano was in what is now the San Felasco Hammock northwest of Gainesville).

== European colonialization ==
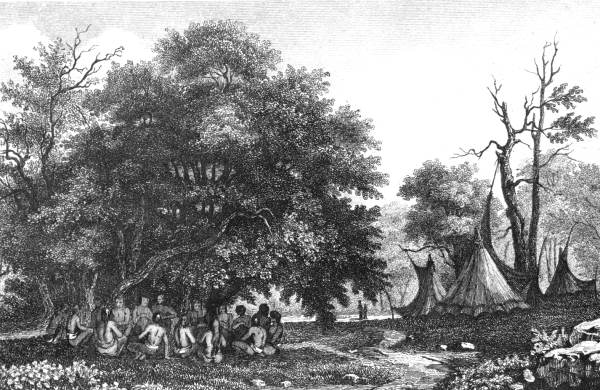
Timucua teepee village in Florida circa 1562

Hernando de Soto and his army passed through Gainesville in August 1539 towards the beginning of their four-year exploration of what is now the southeastern United States, the third village where they stayed, Utinamocharra, having been in the dense cluster east of Moon Lake at the northwestern edge of present-day Gainesville.

The Native Americans, having little resistance to diseases introduced from Europe, declined significantly in number after the arrival of Europeans, and Spanish suppression of native revolts further reduced the population.

The remaining Timucua were converted to Roman Catholicism and organized into missions overseen by Franciscan priests. The Mission San Francisco de Potano, the first doctrina (a mission with a resident priest) in Florida west of the St. Johns River, was founded in 1606 at the south edge of present-day San Felasco Hammock Preserve State Park. In or adjacent to present-day Gainesville were two other missions (each named for the saint's day the first Mass was said in it), Santa Ana and San Miguel, which were south of and within a day's walk from San Francisco, and are thought to be in the cluster east of Moon Lake where Spanish and Indian artifacts from the Mission-period have been found. The earliest missions were apparently established adjacent to native villages visited by De Soto's expedition; Santa Ana is thought to be located where Utinamocharra lay, and in 1606 the friar who served as the priest was told of cruelties that the chief, when a boy, had suffered from De Soto's men. Chief Potano's town was relocated in the colonial period to the vicinity of the Devil's Millhopper, which is now inside the Gainesville city limits, from the western shore of Orange Lake.

In the first decade of the 18th century, however, colonial raiders from the Province of Carolina and their Yamasee Indian allies had killed or carried off nearly all the remaining native inhabitants (10,000 − 12,000 native Floridians were taken as slaves, according to the governor of Spanish Florida) and the few remaining Timucua fled and ended up living in the vicinity of St. Augustine.

Spanish colonists began cattle ranching in the Paynes Prairie area using Timucua labor, and the largest hacienda (ranch) became known as La Chua (which combines the Spanish definite article La with the Timucuan word Chua, meaning "sinkhole"). Although La Chua was destroyed by the above-mentioned raiders from Carolina, the ranch nevertheless gave its name to the Alachua band of the Seminole tribe who settled in the region in the 18th century under the leadership of the great chief Ahaya the Cowkeeper.

Between 1763 and 1784 what is now Gainesville fell within the jurisdiction of the colony of British East Florida.

== Early American settlement ==
Gainesville was founded to place the Alachua County seat on the proposed route of the Florida Railroad Company's line stretching from Cedar Key to Fernandina Beach. County residents decided to move the county seat from Newnansville (and chose the name Gainesville) in 1853, as the proposed railroad would bypass Newnansville. A site on Black Oak Ridge where the railroad was expected to cross it was selected in 1854. It is generally accepted that the new settlement was named for General Edmund P. Gaines, commander of U.S. Army troops in Florida early in the Second Seminole War. The railroad was completed from Fernandina to Gainesville in 1859, passing six blocks south of the courthouse.

It is claimed that Gainesville was originally named Hogtown; however, Hogtown was actually an early 19th-century settlement in and around what is now Westside Park (in the northeast corner of the intersection of NW 8th Avenue and 34th Street) where a historical marker notes Hogtown's location at that site. Hogtown is the eponymous village of the adjacent Hogtown Creek, which flows 5.7 miles (9.2 km) through Gainesville. Hogtown continued to exist until after Gainesville was founded, as evidenced on a map showing both towns, which was published in 1864 based on surveys from 1855. Two residents of Hogtown played a prominent role in establishing Gainesville. William Lewis, who owned a plantation in Hogtown, delivered 20 votes pledged to him to create a new town on the expected route of the railroad, in an attempt to have the new town named Lewisville. Tillman Ingram, who also owned a plantation and a sawmill in Hogtown, helped swing the vote to move the county seat to the new town by offering to build a new courthouse at a low price. Residents of Newnansville, disgruntled at losing the county seat, called the site chosen for the new town "Hog Wallow", because of its location between Hogtown and Paynes Prairie. The former site of Hogtown was annexed by the City of Gainesville in 1961.

A town site of 103.25 acres (41.78 ha) was purchased for $642.51. The County Commission ordered the public sale of lots in the town site in 1854, but no deeds were recorded until 1856. A courthouse was constructed in Gainesville in 1856, and the county seat was then officially moved from Newnansville. A jail was built in 1857, and a well was dug and a pump for public use installed the same year. Property values rose quickly. A city block on the edge of town purchased for $14.57 in 1857 sold for $100 in 1858. The railroad from Fernandina reached Gainesville in 1859, and connected to Cedar Key the next year. By that time, there were eight or nine stores and three hotels surrounding the courthouse square.

== Secession and the Civil War ==
In the 1850s secessionist sentiment was strong in Gainesville. Half of the white residents in Gainesville had been born in South Carolina (where secessionist sentiments were very strong), or had parents who had been born in that state. Aside from a few foreign-born residents, the other whites in town had also been born in Florida or other Southern states. Another factor was fear of blacks. Blacks, mostly slaves, were a majority of the population in Alachua County (although there were few in Gainesville itself). John Brown's raid on Harpers Ferry in 1859 frightened the whites in Gainesville, leading them to organize a militia company called the Gainesville Minutemen.

The Gainesville Minute Men were incorporated into the First Florida Regiment soon after Florida seceded from the Union. Several more companies were recruited in Gainesville and Alachua County during the Civil War. During the war Gainesville served as a depot for food requisitioned by the Confederate government from the surrounding area. A small post on the east side of Gainesville called Fort Lee was an induction point for men entering the Confederate States Army.

Fighting on a small scale reached Gainesville twice. On February 15, 1864, a small Union raiding party occupied Gainesville. Elements of the Second Florida Cavalry attempted to drive the Union force from the town but were defeated in a street battle. The raiding party was associated with a larger Union invasion of Florida that was defeated at the Battle of Olustee five days later. The Union troops did not seize or destroy any property on this raid, but did distribute food stores to the residents, who were suffering from shortages. Six months later, early in the morning of August 17, 1864, 265 Union troops and 15 "loyal Floridians" reached Gainesville. The troops stopped just east of town to prepare breakfast and care for their horses. A small home guard of 30 to 40 old men and boys attacked the Union camp, and were easily driven off. The Union troops then broke ranks and started looting the town. While the Union troops were scattered throughout the town a large number of Confederate troops were spotted approaching. The Union troops resisted the Confederate advance for an hour and a half, but were finally driven from Gainesville with heavy casualties.

== After the Civil War ==
For several months following the Civil War, the 3rd United States Colored Troops were stationed in Gainesville, which encouraged freed men to settle there. At the same time black farm laborers were recruited from Georgia and South Carolina to help harvest what was expected to be a very large cotton crop, but heavy rain ruined the cotton, and the recently arrived blacks were left without work. Black residents soon outnumbered whites in Gainesville, which had had 223 white residents in 1860. Vagrancy and theft became major problems in Gainesville, and large numbers of blacks were arrested by federal troops.

White residents resumed political life in Florida immediately after the end of the Civil War. Gainesville incorporated as a city in 1866, but the city government was weak and the council did not maintain a regular schedule of meetings. With military control asserted over Florida in 1867 as part of Reconstruction, the reconstituted Florida legislature required all cities to re-incorporate, and Gainesville did so in 1869. During Reconstruction Gainesville blacks were elected to a number of state and local offices. Blacks had largely been disenfranchised by the 1890s, however.

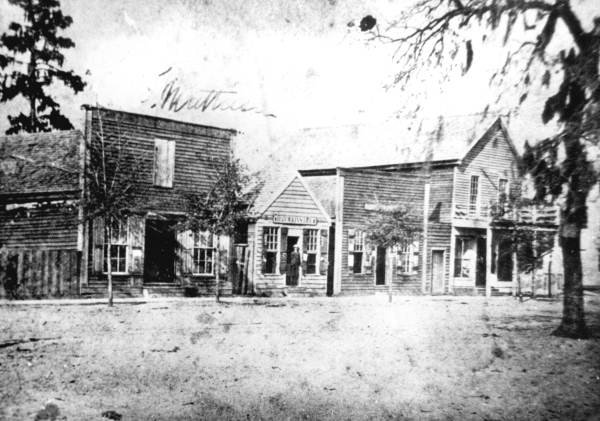
Downtown Gainesville on Alachua Avenue (now University Avenue) circa 1882

Following the Civil War, the city prospered as an important cotton shipping facility. Florida produced more Sea Island Cotton in the 1880s than any other state, and Gainesville was the leading shipping point for cotton in Florida. Two more railroads had reached Gainesville by the 1880s, and citrus and vegetables had become important local crops. However, the citrus industry ended when the great freezes of 1894−95 and 1899 destroyed the crops, and citrus growing was largely abandoned in the area. Phosphate mining and lumbering became important parts of the local economy. A manufacturing area grew up south of downtown, near the railroads.

The first school for blacks in Gainesville, the Union Academy, was established in 1866 by the Freedmen's Bureau to educate freed slaves. White residents of Gainesville were opposed to education for blacks and treated the teachers at the school badly, including incidents of boys throwing "missiles" into the classrooms. By 1898 the school served 500 students, and it continued in operation until 1929. White students had only private schools available before 1869, including the East Florida Seminary, which moved from Ocala in 1866 and merged with the Gainesville Academy (founded in 1856). Even after a public school system had been established in Alachua County, most white children who went to school did so at private schools, and the Union Academy was in session for a larger part of the year, and its teachers were better paid, than was the case for the public schools. Public education remained underfunded into the 1880s, classes having to meet in abandoned houses or rented rooms. The school year for public schools was as short as three months for some years. The first public school building was built in 1885. The Gainesville Graded and High School, with twelve classrooms and an auditorium, opened in 1900, and most of the private schools closed soon after. The county school board also provided some funds for upkeep of the Union Academy.

There was no dedicated church building in Gainesville in the first years of its existence. A church built in 1859 by the Presbyterians was shared by itinerant preachers of several denominations until 1874. The Methodist mission to Gainesville lapsed during the Civil War, and a church they had built was used by a black congregation after the war. Several white Protestant denominations organized congregations and built churches in the 1870s. Catholics, who had been holding services in private homes for 25 years, built a church in 1887. Jewish families began moving to Gainesville in the late 1860s. Although a Jewish cemetery was established in 1872, there was no synagogue in Gainesville until 1924.

Gainesville was a rough town after the Civil War and into the early 20th century. Whites and blacks commonly carried firearms, and gunshots were often heard at night. Killings and serious injuries were frequent. Some of the violence was racial. Young Mens Democratic Clubs (usually a cover name for the Ku Klux Klan), formed in the late 1860s to fight political domination by Republican northerners and blacks, reportedly burned the homes of many Republicans and killed nineteen people, including five blacks. A black man was taken from the jail and lynched in 1871. In 1891 a black man and a white man, members of a dreaded gang, were also taken from the jail and lynched. Later that year a black man accused of giving shelter to Harmon Murray, another member of that gang, was also taken from the jail and lynched. The city had only a single police officer until well into the 20th century, which was inadequate to deal with the violence. A posse authorized by the city council also did little to stem the violence. Punishments for crime included public executions, the pillory, lashes and fines.

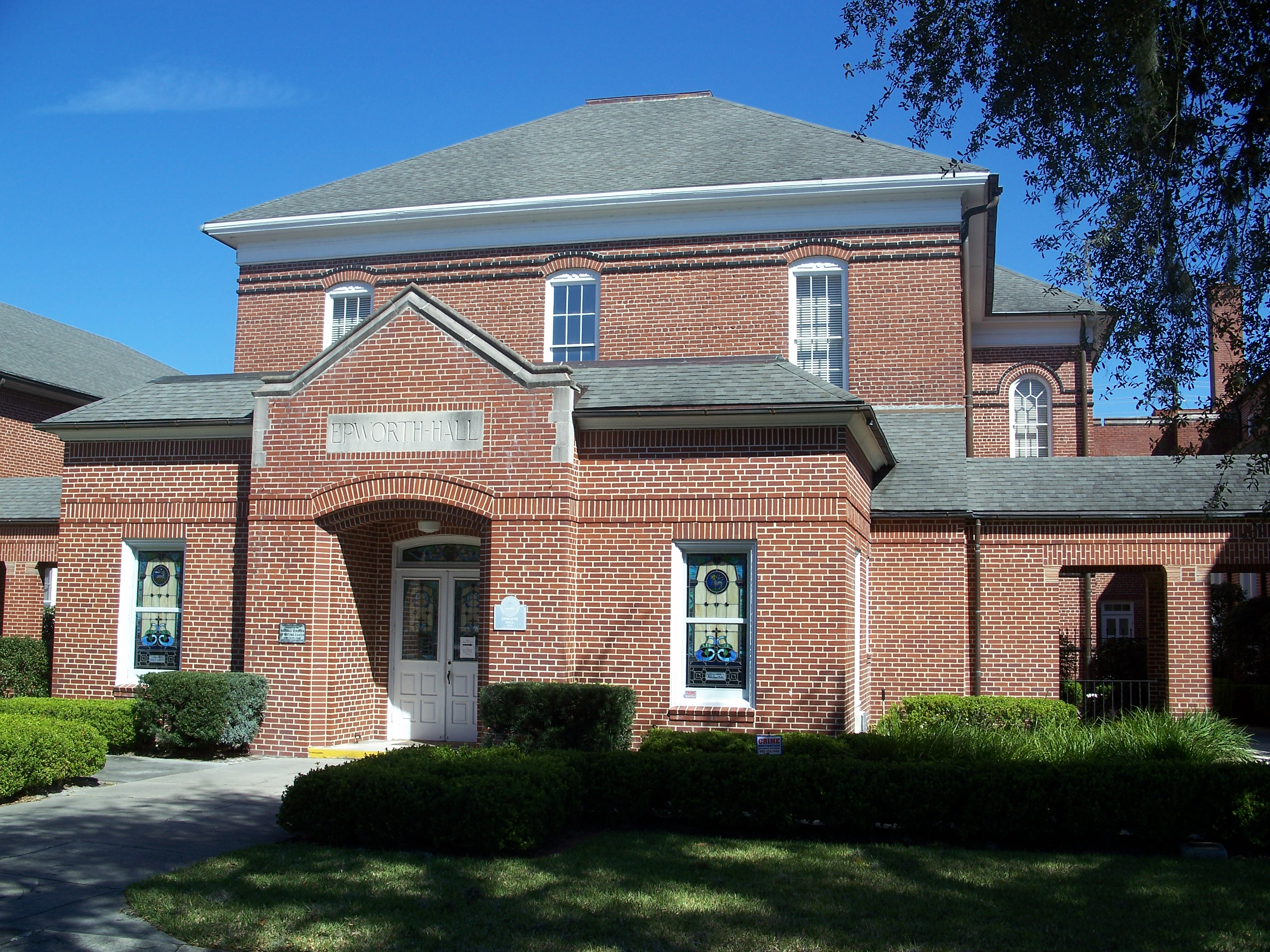
Epworth Hall, built in 1884; used by the East Florida Seminary until it merged with the University of Florida

A volunteer fire department was organized in 1882, but was unable to stop several fires in 1884 that burned most of the wooden buildings in downtown Gainesville. The burned buildings were replaced with brick structures. A brick courthouse replaced the old wooden one in 1885. Public utilities were gradually installed in the city late in the 19th century; gas in 1887, water in 1891, and telephones and electricity later in the 1890s. By 1900 Gainesville was the seventh largest city in Florida, with over 3,600 residents.

The Republican Party remained strong in Gainesville even after the end of Reconstruction in 1876 because of the large number of blacks and Northern whites who had moved there after the Civil War. Some Southerners had also joined the Republican Party. Alachua County was one of the few counties in Florida that was won by the Republican Party in the election of 1880. In the 1880s Republicans and Democrats reached an accommodation. In the election of 1883 most city races were won by wide majorities, with both Republicans and Democrats, white and blacks, being elected. There was tension within the Republican Party between blacks and Northern whites, however. By 1885 the arrival of whites from northern states and the departure of blacks gave Gainesville a white majority. The imposition by the Florida Legislature in 1889 of a poll tax and a de facto literacy test in the form of separate ballot boxes for each office, which required voters to be able to read labels on the boxes to vote correctly, effectively disenfranchised most blacks. Some blacks switched to the Democratic Party, further weakening the Republicans, and the Republican Party ceased to be a factor in Gainesville politics in the 1890s.

== 20th century ==
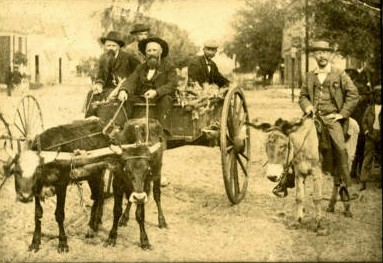
Gainesville, circa 1900

Major change came to Gainesville early in the 20th century. Citizens felt that the city did not have sufficient resources and powers to provide the services demanded in a growing city. The state legislature was asked to grant Gainesville a new charter, and in 1905 it did so, also enlarging the city limits. The city offered its first bond issue the same year. Money from bond issues was used to start a sewer system and pave important streets, initially with crushed rock, and after 1910, with bricks. When private companies were unable to provide adequate electric service to Gainesville, the city built a generating plant, which became operational in 1914.

Another development in 1905 had a significant impact on the future of Gainesville. At the time, Florida was funding eight post-secondary schools. Concerned about rising requests for funding and duplication of course offerings, the state legislature passed the Buckman Act, consolidating the eight institutions into four segregated schools, including, for white men, the University of the State of Florida (renamed University of Florida in 1909). Gainesville competed for the university, with Lake City as its principal rival. Gainesville offered free water for the school from the city system, 500 acres (200 ha) west of the city, purchase of the East Florida Seminary site from the state for $30,000, and $40,000 cash. The fact that Alachua was a dry county, banning the sale of all alcohol other than low-alcohol beer, was viewed as a factor in favor of Gainesville. The state selected Gainesville, causing the biggest celebration in the history of the city.

The university opened with 136 students in the fall of 1906. For the first decade of the school's existence it was in a rural setting, connected to downtown Gainesville by a single crushed rock road. The school had to close its gates at night to keep wandering cows out. Buildings at the university were originally built with state funds, but in 1919 the city contributed $1,000 for a new gymnasium to help bring the New York Giants to town for spring training. As the university grew, commercial establishments spread westward along University Avenue and new subdivisions were developed near the campus.

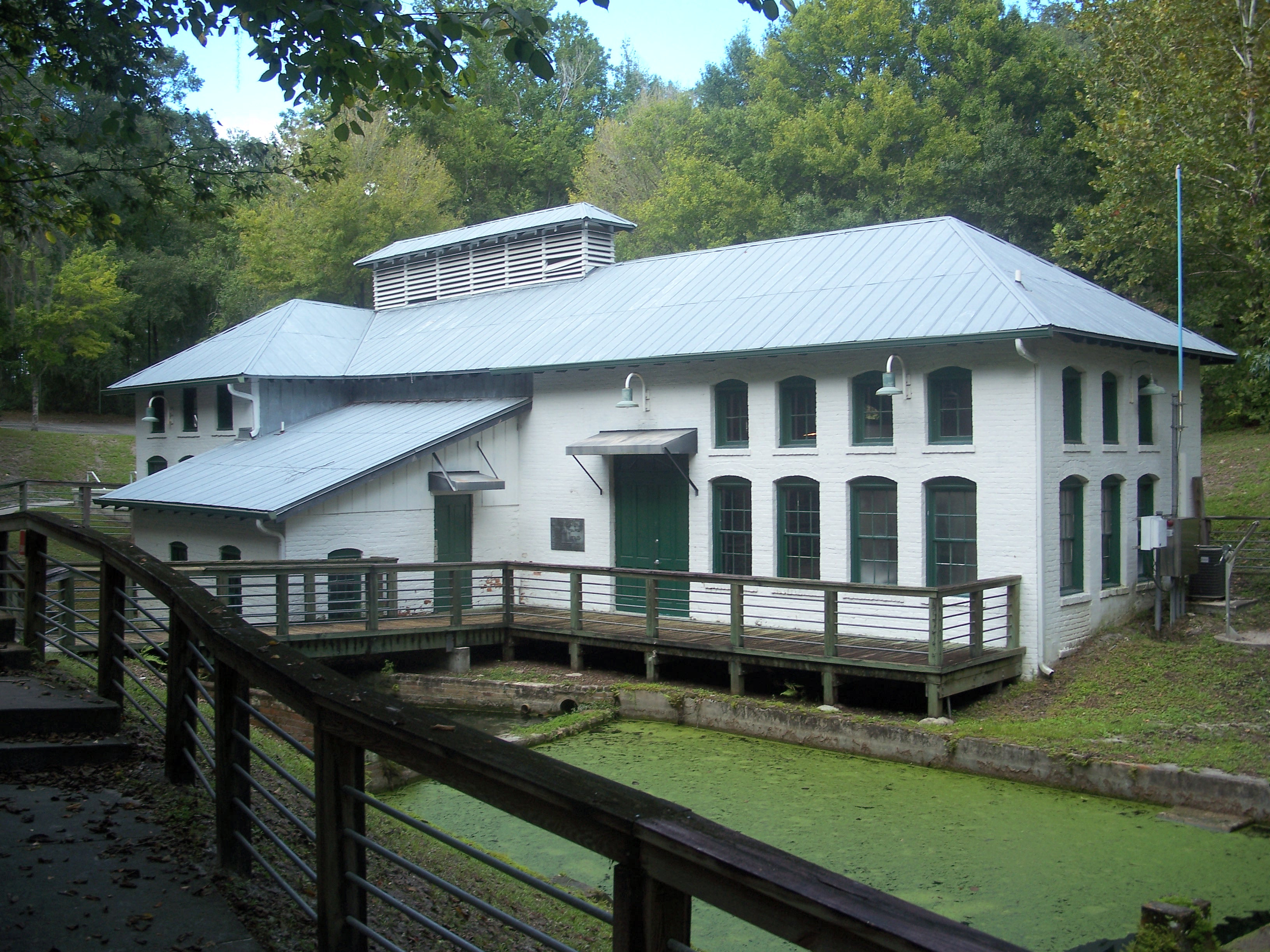
Boulware Springs Waterworks

The city experienced growing pains in the first decades of the century. The city's only water supply had been Boulware Springs for many years, but the limits of its supply had been reached, and the city could no longer connect new subdivisions to city utilities. A bond issue was required to drill a well and build a water tower. A fire house was built in 1903, and the fire department was modernized, replacing its last horses with motorized equipment in 1913. However, the department remained a volunteer organization until the 1920s.

Gainesville's economy was still dominated by agriculture. Gainesville was a major shipping point for cotton until the industry was devastated by the boll weevil infestation in 1916–18, after which cotton was abandoned as a crop in the area. Truck farming had become important in north central Florida, with large shipments of vegetables and melons from Gainesville to markets in the northern US. Phosphate mining continued to be important, although starting to decline, and industries such as processing naval stores and making fertilizer thrived in Gainesville. World War I severely affected the economy in Gainesville. Markets in Europe, in particular Germany, were cut off by the war, and phosphate mining and the naval stores industry went into a slump, aggravated by the loss of cotton processing and shipping.

== Boom and bust ==
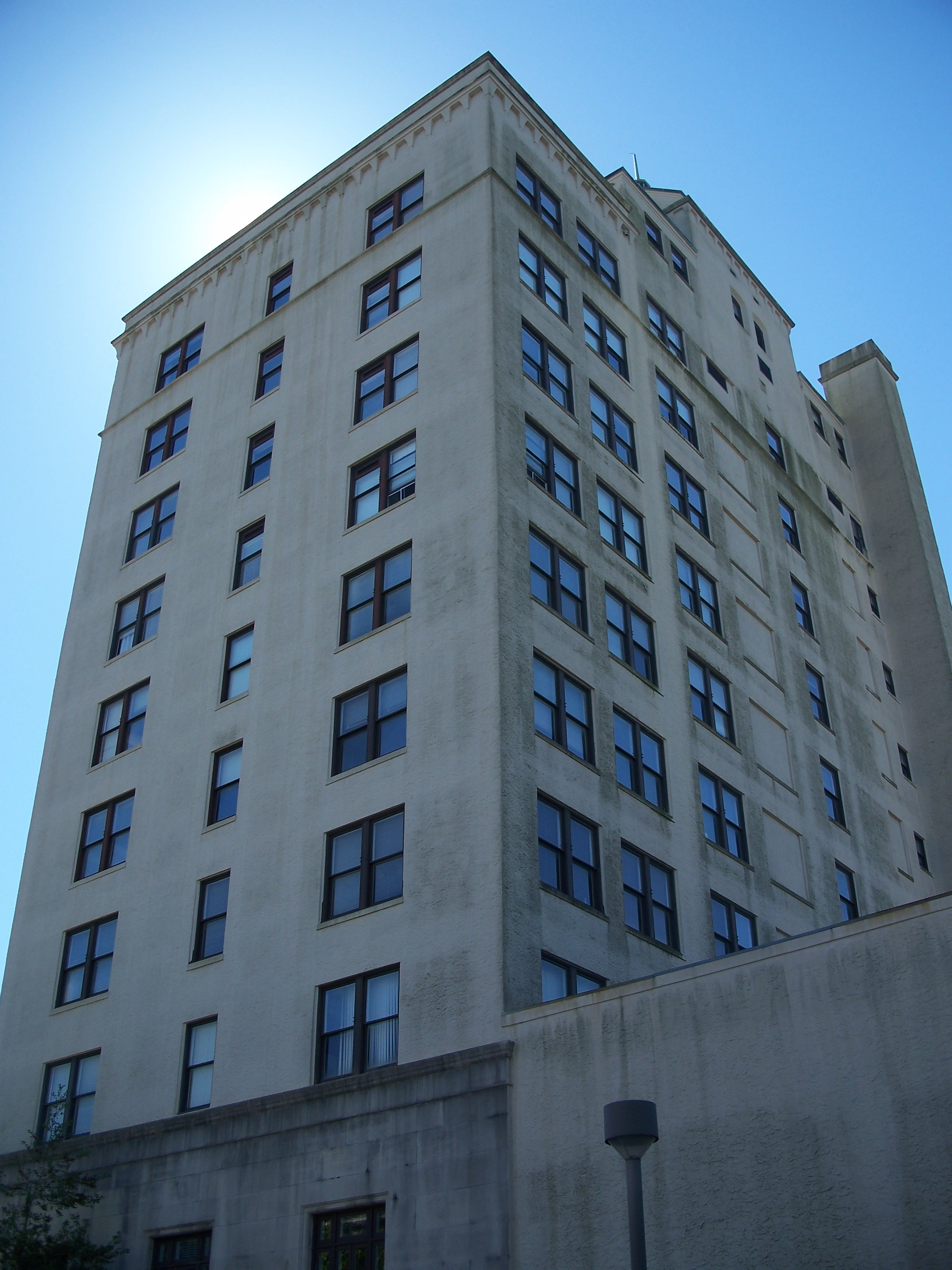
Seagle Building

Gainesville participated in the national economic boom that followed the end of World War I. In 1925, Gainesville was swept up by the land boom that had started in Miami Beach earlier in the year. New subdivisions were platted and auctioned, binders on property were sold and resold with ever-increasing prices, and almost 100 real estate brokers and agents were registered in Gainesville on the first day licenses were required. Plans were floated to build a modern first-class hotel in Gainesville. After a false start in which the financing plans fell through, a developer from southern Florida who had become heavily involved in the real estate market in Gainesville, W. McKey Kelly, put forward plans for a ten-story, 120-room hotel. Construction on the Hotel Kelly, also known as the Dixie Hotel, started in 1926, but Kelly ran out of money before construction was completed, and the collapse of the land boom doomed the project. The unfinished hotel sat empty for more than a decade until a federal grant and private donation allowed its completion as the Seagle Building.

Glen Springs hosted the first concrete swimming pool in Gainesville in the mid-1920s. It was a popular recreation site for over 40 years.

Changes in city government occurred in the 1920s. The city changed its charter to add a city manager. The police force was increased from three men to nine, and a desk sergeant was available to answer a telephone 24 hours a day. Alachua General Hospital opened in Gainesville in 1928. More streets were paved, using asphalt rather than bricks. Increasing demand for electricity led the city commission to consider contracting with Florida Power and Light rather than issuing bonds to expand the city generating capacity, but voters passed an amendment to the city charter forbidding any such deal. With a booming population, schools had become overcrowded. Gainesville High School was opened in 1926 and expanded two years later. The old Gainesville Graded and High School became an elementary school. Lincoln School, offering 12 grades for African-Americans, opened in 1923, replacing the Union Academy, which had served African-American students since 1867.

The Ku Klux Klan became active in Gainesville in the early 1920s. As elsewhere, it was anti-black, anti-semitic, and anti-Catholic, and professed to uphold morality. In an early incident, a worker was kidnapped from his job late at night and beaten severely for neglecting his wife and children. A police officer had tried to intervene, but retreated when guns were drawn. City officials condoned the incident. Former mayor William Reuben Thomas condemned the event and called for the mayor and police chief, who apparently were members of the Klan, to step down, to no avail. The Klan also objected to a Catholic priest who had organized a drama club at the University, and in 1923 Catholic priests were officially banned from all state college campuses. The next year three men in full Klan regalia kidnapped the priest from his rectory, beat him severely, and castrated him. The priest and another witness identified two of the kidnappers as the mayor and police chief of Gainesville, but there was no publicity and no investigation of the incident. In the 1930s the Klan took credit for burning down the houses of prostitution on North Main Street, ostensibly to protect the morals of the students at the University.

The collapse of the land boom in 1925–1926 had not been as severe in Gainesville as in southern Florida, but did cool off the local economy. As a result, the Wall Street Crash of 1929 was not felt as strongly as in many other places. The city of Gainesville remained solvent throughout the Great Depression, and unemployment was lower than in most of the country. Agriculture continued to be a mainstay of the local economy. In 1922 tung trees were planted in Alachua County, and Gainesville became the center of tung oil production in the United States. Tung oil had previously been available only from China. Both tung oil and tung tree seeds were shipped around the world from Gainesville. The University of Florida, with about 1,000 employees and 2,000 students, helped stabilize the local economy during the Depression. In the middle and late 1930s various New Deal programs brought money and employment to Gainesville. Utility lines were extended, streets paved and sidewalks installed. The Seagle Building was completed and occupied by the University of Florida. An airport, Gainesville's first, was built.

== World War II and after ==
World War II brought economic and population growth to Gainesville. Even before the United States entered the war, the opening of Camp Blanding affected Gainesville, with soldiers on leave visiting the city, and officers renting housing for their families. The airport was improved and taken over by the Army Air Corps as the Alachua Army Airbase. Agriculture prospered and local industries received contracts for producing military supplies. Building construction also increased. The hospital was expanded with financial help from the federal government. The university was used to train enlisted men, air cadets and officers.

The end of World War II brought even more growth to Gainesville. The G.I. Bill allowed war veterans to attend college, and enrollment at the University of Florida boomed. More than half of the approximately 9,000 students at the university in 1946–47 were veterans. Many of the veterans had families, straining housing availability in the city. The university became co-educational in 1947, with the admission of over 800 women. The population of Gainesville doubled from 1940 to 1950, with construction and employment at the university becoming more important in the city's economy. The city's power plant was inadequate for demand. The federal government had required the city to buy electricity from private power companies rather than expand its own generating capacity during World War II. After the voters again rejected a proposal for the city to buy electric power wholesale, the city embarked on a major expansion of power generation. The water and sewer systems also were greatly expanded. The airport was returned to the city, and scheduled passenger flights started in 1950. The police department expanded from about 10 officers in the 1930s to 40 by 1950. Also in 1950, the old system of named streets was replaced by a quadrant system of numbered streets.

The rapid growth of Gainesville put a strain on the public schools. When residents voted down proposals to issue bonds for school construction, the school board acquired surplus barracks from army bases to use as temporary classroom. The newer residents helped to pass school bond issues beginning in the 1950s. The return of veterans to Gainesville and the growth of the university also began to influence politics in Gainesville. In the 1930s, land ownership in and around Gainesville, and with it political power, had become concentrated in fewer hands. Veterans returning to the city after World War II had difficulty entering financial and political inner circles. University faculty and staff had been well integrated into the community before the war, but the growth after the war brought in many faculty who were dissatisfied with the political status quo in Gainesville. To avert tensions with local politicians, J. Hillis Miller, president of the university from 1947 to 1953, barred university faculty and staff from participating in local politics.

During the 1960s, Gainesville became a center for college activism, and was described by then-professor Marshall Jones as "The Berkeley of the South". The city was the center of the Gainesville Eight case in the 1970s, in which eight activists were accused of conspiracy to violently disrupt the 1972 Republican National Convention in Miami Beach. After their acquittal, activism declined, but rose again during the mid-1980s, as the University of Florida became the state's focal point for anti-apartheid activism.

The city gained notoriety in 2010 and 2011 after local church Dove World Outreach Center was involved in anti-sharia law campaigns, Quran burnings, the promotion of the Innocence of Muslims movie trailer, and anti-mosque campaigns.

In the wake of the Unite the Right rally in Charlottesville, Virginia, the 1904 Confederate monument was removed from downtown Gainesville by the United Daughters of the Confederacy on August 14, 2017.

== Timeline ==
=== Prior to 20th century ===
- 1824 - Hogtown, originally a village of Seminoles who raised hogs, depopulated when Chief John Mico received $20 as compensation for the "improvements" the Seminoles had made there.
- 1830 – Hogtown established.
- 1853 – Gainesville established, named after U.S. military officer Edmund P. Gaines.
- 1854 – Seat of Alachua County relocated to Gainesville from Newnansville.
- 1856 – School built.
- 1858 – Gainesville Academy founded.
- 1859 – Florida Railroad begins operating.
- 1860 – Population: 269.
- 1864
  - February 14–15: "Gainesville occupied by Union forces and skirmish fought."
  - August 17: Battle of Gainesville fought; Confederates win.
- 1865 – New Era newspaper begins publication.
- 1866 – Union Academy opens.
- 1867 – East Florida Seminary relocated to Gainesville from Ocala.
- 1869 – Town of Gainesville incorporated.
- 1884
  - Fire.
  - City of Alachua established in vicinity of Gainesville.
- 1886 – Fire.
- 1890
  - Daily Sun newspaper in publication.
  - Population: 2,790.
- 1891 – "Public water system" begins operating.
- 1900
  - Gainesville High School building constructed.
  - Population: 3,633.

=== 20th century ===
- 1901 – William Reuben Thomas becomes mayor.
- 1906 – University of the State of Florida relocated to Gainesville from Lake City.
- 1907
  - Gainesville becomes a city.
  - University's Agricultural Experiment Station established.
- 1910
  - Thomas residence built.
  - Population: 6,183.
- 1911 – University's Florida Gators football team active.
- 1912 – University's Florida Alligator newspaper begins publication.
- 1914
  - University's Cadet Band formed (later Fightin' Gator Marching Band)
  - First public power plant completed, named the Downtown Power Plant
- 1917 – Florida State Museum established.
- 1918 – Gordon Tison becomes mayor.
- 1925 – "Tung oil production begins."
- 1928
  - WRUF radio begins broadcasting.
  - Hotel Thomas in business.
- 1930
  - University's Florida Field stadium opens.
  - Population: 10,465.
- 1935 – Airport built.
- 1940 – Population: 13,757.
- 1950
  - Gainesville Drive-In cinema in business.
  - Population: 26,861.
- 1958 – WUFT (TV) begins broadcasting.
- 1960 – Population: 29,701.
- 1961 - Gainesville annexed the former site of Hogtown.
- 1964 – University's Institute of Food and Agricultural Sciences established.
- 1966
  - Santa Fe Community College established.
  - White Theatre (cinema) in business.
- 1967 – Alachua County Historical Society founded.
- 1970 – Population: 64,510.
- 1972 – Santa Fe College Teaching Zoo and Historic Gainesville Inc. established.
- 1974 – Thomas Center established.
- 1975 – Alachua County Courthouse built.
- 1980 – Population: 81,371.
- 1981 – WUFT-FM radio begins broadcasting.
- 1988 – Florida Museum of Natural History active.
- 1989 – Matheson Historical Center established.
- 1993 – Corrine Brown becomes U.S. representative for Florida's 3rd congressional district; Karen Thurman becomes U.S. representative for Florida's 5th congressional district.
- 1994 – Matheson Museum opens.
- 2000
  - City website online (approximate date).
  - Population: 95,447.

=== 21st century ===
- 2004 – Pegeen Hanrahan becomes mayor.
- 2010
  - Craig Lowe becomes mayor.
  - Population: 124,354.
- 2013 – Ed Braddy becomes mayor.
- 2016 – Lauren Poe becomes mayor.

== Images ==
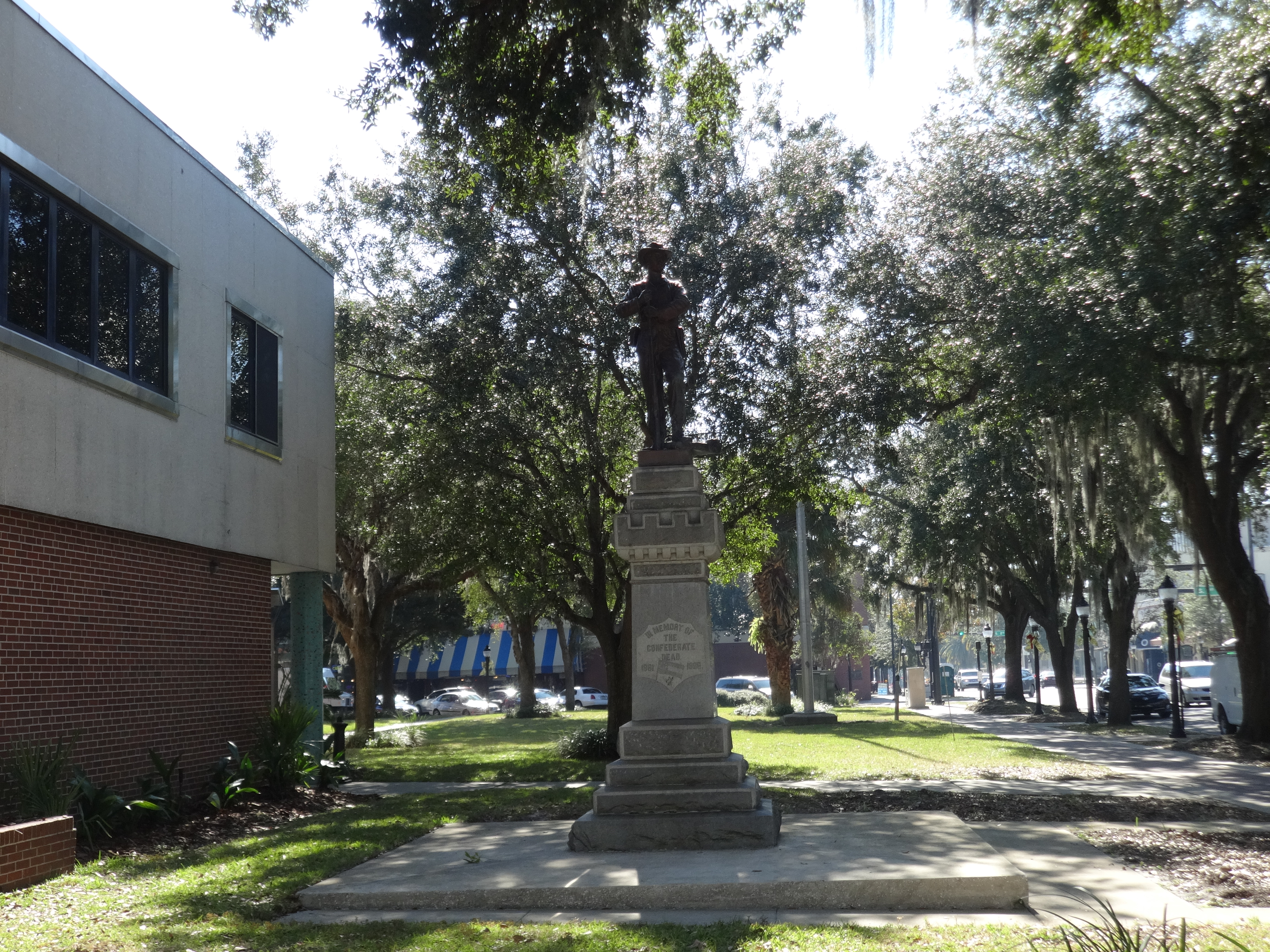
Confederate monument in Gainesville, erected 1904 (photo 2014) Statue was removed August 14, 2017.

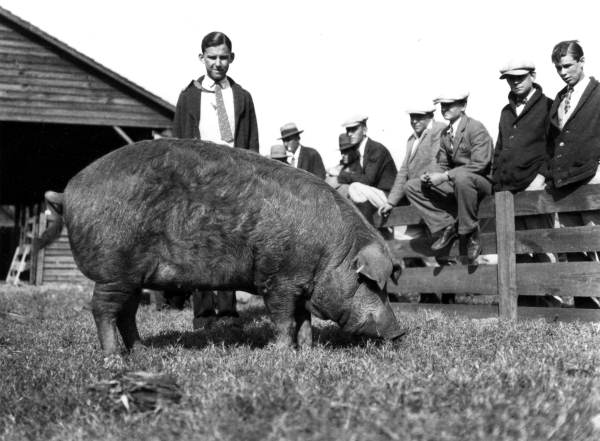
University's Agricultural Experiment Station, est. 1907

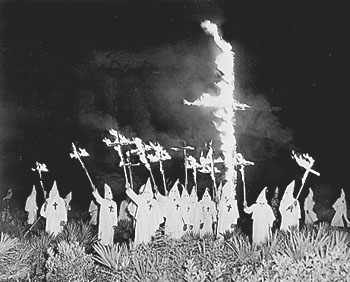
Ku Klux Klan meeting in Gainesville, 1922

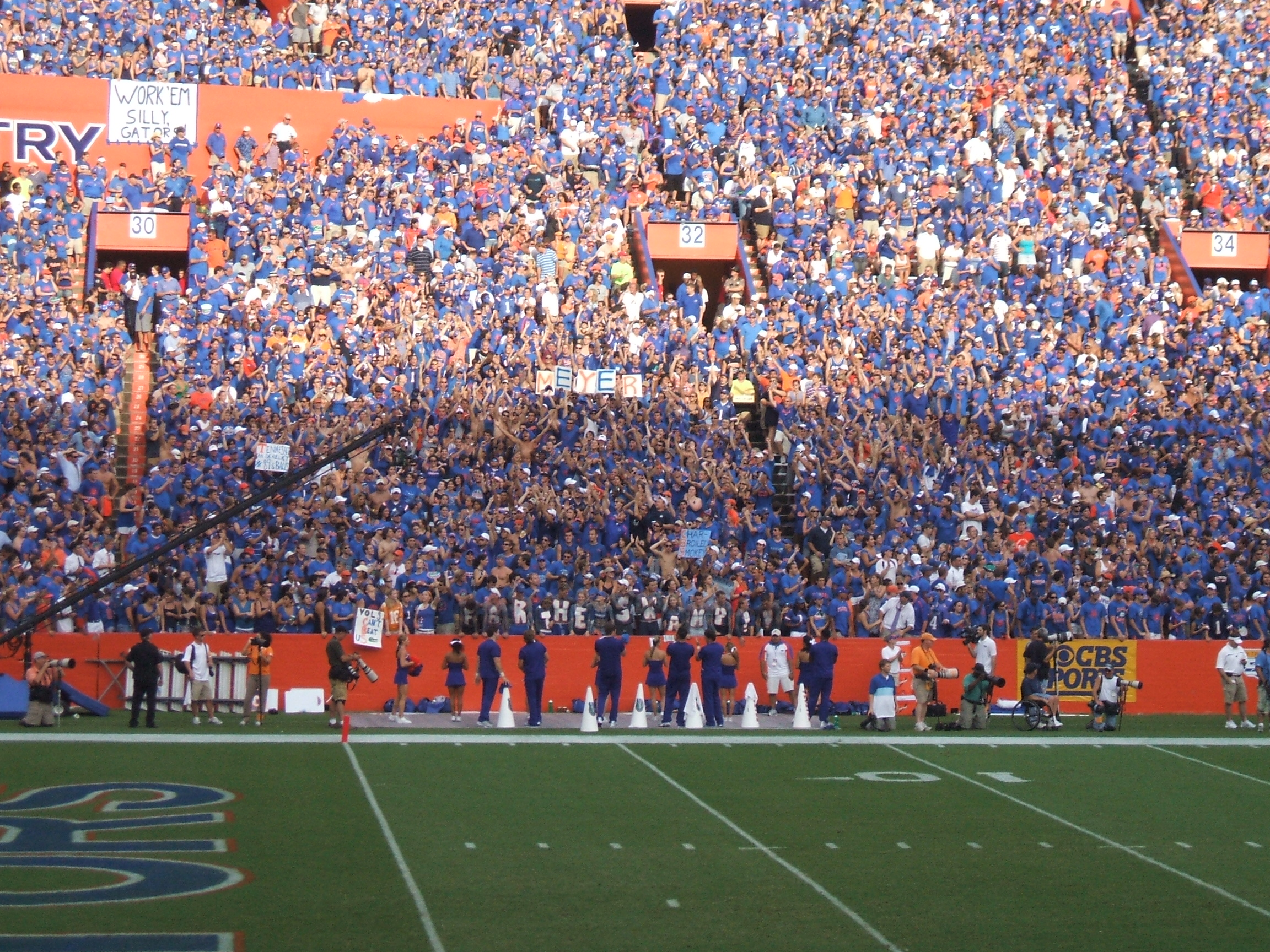
Fans of University's football team in Ben Hill Griffin Stadium, built 1930 (photo 2006)

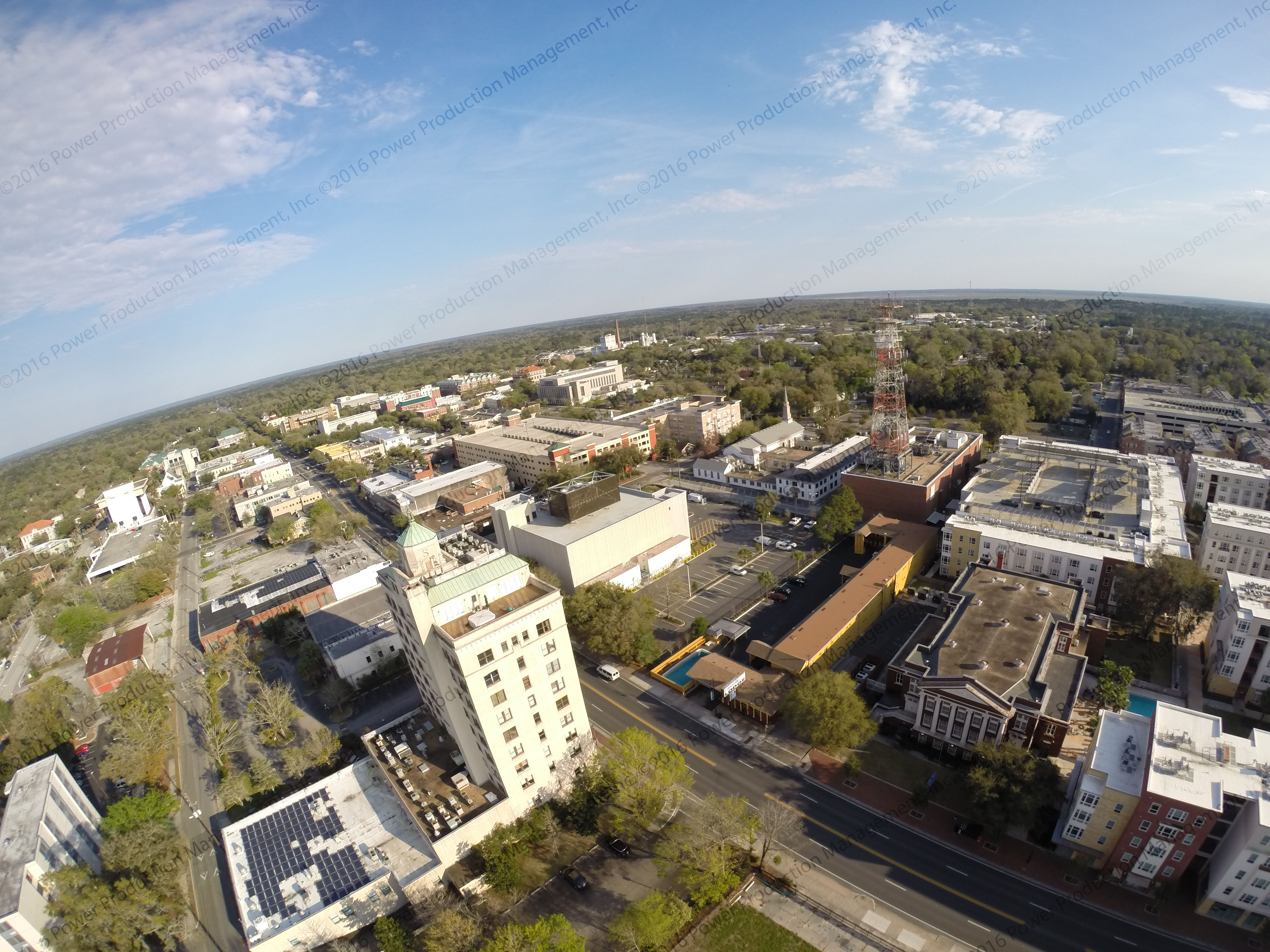
Aerial view of Gainesville, 2014

== See also ==
- List of mayors of Gainesville, Florida
- National Register of Historic Places listings in Alachua County, Florida
- Timelines of other cities in the North Florida area of Florida: Jacksonville, Pensacola, Tallahassee

== Bibliography ==
- Brinton, Daniel G. (1869). "Gainesville". Guide-Book of Florida and the South. Bicentennial Floridiana facsimile series. Philadelphia: George Maclean. hdl:2027/ufl2.uf00103284_00001. ISBN 9780813004150 – via HathiTrust. (1978 facsimile ed. by University of Florida)
- Richards, John R., ed. (1886). "Gainesville". Florida State Gazetteer and Business Directory. New York: South Publishing Company. OCLC 12186532.
- Burtz' Gainesville Directory. J.E. Burtz. 1905 – via Internet Archive.
- Gannett, Henry (1905). The Origin of Certain Place Names in the United States. Govt. Print. Off.
- "Gainesville". Florida Gazetteer and Business Directory 1907-1908. R. L. Polk & Co. 1907.
- Chisholm, Hugh, ed. (1910). "Gainesville (Florida)" . Encyclopædia Britannica. Vol. 11 (11th ed.). Cambridge University Press. p. 388.
- "Gainesville". Florida State Gazetteer and Business Directory. R. L. Polk & Co. 1918.
- Cutler, Harry Gardner (1923). History of Florida, Past and Present: Historical and Biographical. Chicago: Lewis Publishing Company.
- Federal Writers' Project (1939), "Gainesville", Florida; a Guide to the Southernmost State, American Guide Series, New York: Oxford University Press, pp. 380–382, ISBN 9781623760090
- Mowat, Charles Loch (1974) [1943]. East Florida as a British province, 1763–1784. Milwood, NY: Kraus Reprint Company. OCLC 1069949797.
- Hildreth, Charles H.; Cox, Merlin G. (1981). History of Gainesville, Florida 1854-1979. Gainesville, Florida: Alachua County Historical Society.
- Boone, Floyd E. (1988). Florida Historical Markers & Sites: A Guide to More Than 700 Historic Sites Includes the Complete Text of Each Marker. Houston, Texas: Gulf Publishing Company. ISBN 978-0-87201-558-6.
- Pickard, Ben (1991). Historic Gainesville: a tour Guide to the Past. Gainesville, Florida: Historic Gainesville, Inc.
- McCarthy, Kevin M.; Laurie, Murray D. (1997). Guide to the University of Florida and Gainesville. Sarasota, florida: Pineapple Press. ISBN 1-56164-134-0.
- Newton, Michael (2001). The Invisible Empire: The Ku Klux Klan in Florida. Gainesville, Florida: The University Press of Florida. ISBN 0-8130-2120-0.
- Kisling, Vernon N. Jr., ed. (2001). Zoo and Aquarium History. CRC Press. ISBN 978-1-4200-3924-5.
- American Association for State and Local History (2002). Directory of Historical Organizations in the United States and Canada (15th ed.). Rowman Altamira. ISBN 978-0759100022.
- Braley, R. Olin (2004). The Killing of Harmon Murray: Being a True Account of the Life and Times of Florida's Premier Black Outlaw. Gainesville, Florida: The Alachua Press. OCLC 58458689.
- Andersen, Lars (2004). Paynes Prairie: The Great Savanna: A History and Guide. Sarasota, Florida: Pineapple Press. ISBN 1-56164-296-7.
- Hellmann, Paul T. (2006). "Florida: Gainesville". Historical Gazetteer of the United States. Taylor & Francis. pp. 193–194. ISBN 978-1-135-94859-7.
- Rajtar, Steve (2007). Guide to Historic Gainesville. Charleston, South Carolina: History Press. ISBN 978-1-59629-217-8.
- Hicks, Rob (2008). Images of America: Gainesville. Arcadia Publishing. ISBN 978-0-7385-5402-0.

Milanich sources

- Milanich, Jerald T. (1995). Florida Indians and the Invasion from Europe. Gainesville, Florida: University Press of Florida. ISBN 0-8130-1636-3.
- Milanich, Jerald T. (1998). Florida's Indians from Ancient Times to the Present. Gainesville, Florida: University Press of Florida. ISBN 0-8130-1598-7.
- Milanich, Jerald T. (1999). The Timucua. Oxford, UK: Blackwell Publishers. ISBN 0-631-21864-5.
- Milanich, Jerald T. (2006). Laboring in the Fields of the Lord: Spanish Missions and Southeastern Indians. Gainesville, Florida: University Press of Florida. ISBN 0-8130-2966-X.
