= Frances Stokes Berry =

American political scientist and academic

Frances S. Berry
- Occupations: Political scientist, public administration scholar, academic, and author
- Title: Askew Eminent Scholar and Frank Sherwood Professor
- Awards: Fellow, National Academy of Public Administration John Gaus Award, American Political Science Association Frederickson Award, Public Management Research Association

Academic background
- Education: B.A., Political Science; M.A., Political Science; M.A., Public Affairs; Ph.D., Political Science
- Alma mater: Washington University in St. Louis; University of Minnesota

Frances Stokes Berry is an American political scientist, public administration scholar, academic, and author. She is the Reubin O’D. Askew Eminent Scholar and the Frank Sherwood Professor of Public Administration at the Askew School of Public Administration and Policy at Florida State University.

Berry has published papers and books on topics related to public administration, policy diffusion, and innovation in public management. She is best known for her work exploring the drivers of the adoption of policies and innovations in the public sector. Her research on state-level lottery, strategic planning, and tax policy adoptions has been cited thousands of times. She is also a prominent scholar working on E-democracy, or the uses information and communication technology in political and governance processes. In recognition of her contributions to the fields of political science and public administration, Frances Berry was selected for the John Gaus Award by the American Political Science Association in 2022. In her Gaus Award lecture, Berry (2023, p. 336) stressed that, "Political science and public management scholars learned from one another but have more to learn."

Berry is a fellow of the National Academy of Public Administration. She also received the H. George Frederickson Award from the Public Research Management Association (PMRA). The H. George Frederickson Award honors a senior scholar for career contributions to the field of public management. Exemplary contributions include, but are not limited to, adding to the intellectual development of the field and building professional capital (e.g., journal development and other means of sharing PM scholarship and information) related to public management research. In 2014, she was given the Distinguished Research Award (2013), a joint award from American Society for Public Administration (ASPA), and the National Association of Schools of Public Administration and Policy (NASPAA), awarded annually to one scholar whose work has made a significant impact on the field of public administration.

== Education and early career ==
Berry studied at Washington University in St. Louis and received her bachelor's degree in political science in 1974. Following her undergraduate studies, she obtained two master's degrees from the University of Minnesota. One in political science in 1977 and the other in public affairs in 1979. After earning these degrees, Berry briefly worked as a lecturer at the University of Kentucky before spending more than a decade with the Council of State Governments in various roles including serving as the associate director of the Productivity Research Center, Director of the Center for Health and Regulation, and Director of Division of Associated Programs and Leadership Development. During her work with the Council of State Governments, Berry continued her graduate studies and earned a Ph.D. from the University of Minnesota in 1988.

== Academic career ==
In 1990 Berry joined the Askew School of Public Administration and Policy at Florida State University as an associate professor. Eight years later Berry was promoted to Professor and began serving as the MPA director. From 2003 to 2009, Berry was the Director of the Askew School. As a Fulbright scholar in 2009, she worked in Taiwan. Since 2014, Berry has been the Reubin O’D. Askew Eminent Scholar and the Frank Sherwood Professor of Public Administration in the Askew School of Public Administration and Policy at Florida State University.

== Awards and honors ==
- 2006 – Fellow, National Academy of Public Administration
- 2009 - Visiting Fulbright Scholar, National Taipei University
- 2013 Distinguished Research Award, ASPA/NASPAA
- 2014-2018 - Distinguished Visiting professor, National Taipei University
- 2016 - Delivered Donald Stone Lecture, American Society for Public Administration (ASPA)
- 2018 - The H. George Frederickson Award, Public Management Research Association
- 2022 - John Gaus Award, American Political Science Association (APSA)

== Bibliography ==
=== Books ===
- International Handbook of Practice-Based Performance Management (2007) ISBN 9781412940122. Authors: Patria de Lancer Julnes, Frances Stokes Berry, Maria P. Aristigueta, and Kaifeng Yang

=== Selected articles ===
- Berry, F.S.; Berry, W.D. (1990). State lottery adoptions as policy innovations: An event history analysis. American Political Science Review, 84(2): 395–415. doi:10.2307/1963526
- Berry, F.S.; Berry, W.D. (1992). Tax Innovation in the States: Capitalizing on Political Opportunity. American Journal of Politics, 36(3): 715–742. doi:10.2307/2111588
- Berry, F.S.; Berry, W.D. (2018). Innovation and Diffusion Models in Policy Research in Theories of the Policy Process. IBSN: 9780429494284
- Berry, F.S. (2023). Finding Common Ground: Innovation and Diffusion across Political Science and Public Management Research. PS: Political Science & Politics, 56(3): 329 - 338. doi: 10.1017/S1049096523000112
