= Timeline of Tallahassee, Florida =

The following is a timeline of the history of the city of Tallahassee, Florida, U.S.

== 19th century ==
- 1824
  - U.S. Territory of Florida capital relocated from Pensacola to newly founded Tallahassee.
  - November 8: Legislative Council of the Territory of Florida convenes.
  - Tallahassee designated seat of newly created Leon County.
- 1825 - City of Tallahassee incorporated.
- 1826
  - Florida State Capitol building construction begins.
  - City council holds first council elections (mayor & councilmen elected); municipal government of the City of Tallahassee begins operations
- 1829 - City Cemetery in use.
- 1831 - Williams House built.
- 1832 - First Presbyterian Church established.
- 1834 - Tallahassee-St. Marks railroad built.
- 1835 - Columns house built.
- 1837 - Goodwood Plantation established near Tallahassee.
- 1840 - Population: 1,616.
- 1841 - Yellow Fever epidemic strikes resulting in many deaths
- 1843 - Great Fire strikes and burns much of downtown; Capitol building and county court house survives
- 1845
  - State Capitol building completed.
  - Tallahassee becomes part of the new U.S. state of Florida.
- 1846 - Southern Journal newspaper begins publication.
- 1857 - Florida State College for Women founded.
- 1865
  - March 6: Battle of Natural Bridge fought near Tallahassee during American Civil War; Union forces defeated.
  - "Convention in Tallahassee repealed Florida's secession ordinance; abolished slavery."
- 1881 - St. John's Episcopal Church rebuilt.
- 1887 - State Normal College for Colored Students opens.
- 1899 - February: Great Blizzard of 1899.
- 1900 - Population: 2,981.

== 20th century ==
- 1904 - Florida Christian Advocate newspaper in publication.
- 1905
  - Weekly True Democrat newspaper begins publication.
  - Population: 3,311.
- 1907 - Florida Governor's Mansion built.
- 1909 - Florida Agricultural and Mechanical College for Negroes active.
- 1919 - Commission-manager form of government adopted.
- 1927 - Government's Martin Building constructed.
- 1929 - Dale Mabry Field (airfield) begins operating.
- 1930
  - Ritz Theatre in business.
  - Population: 10,700.
  - Tallahassee Fire Department forms.
- 1933 - Tallahassee Historical Society formed.
- 1935 - WTAL radio begins broadcasting.
- 1937 - Greenwood Cemetery established.
- 1946 - Florida City County Management Association headquartered in Tallahassee (approximate date).
- 1947 - Florida State University active.
- 1949 - Drive-In Theatre in business.
- 1950 - Florida State University College of Business founded.
- 1953 - Florida A&M University active.
- 1955 - WCTV (television) begins broadcasting.
- 1957 - Tallahassee Junior Museum founded.
- 1958 - February 13: City gets record snowfall of 3 inches.
- 1960 - Population: 48,174.
- 1966 - Florida State University College of Law founded.
- 1970 - Historic Tallahassee Preservation Board organized.
- 1972 - Florida Association of City Clerks headquartered in Tallahassee (approximate date).
- 1973 - Florida State University College of Social Sciences founded.
- 1975 - Roman Catholic Diocese of Pensacola–Tallahassee established.
- 1977 - Museum of Florida History established.
- 1980 - Population: 81,548.
- 1981 - Florida Institute of Government headquartered in Tallahassee.
- 1982
  - Tallahassee Genealogical Society active.
  - Florida A&M University – Florida State University College of Engineering founded.
- 1983 - 17th-century Mission San Luis de Apalachee Archaeological and Historic Site established.
- 1988 - LeRoy Collins Institute of public policy established.
- 1989 - Tallahassee Regional Airport begins operating.
- 1992 - Knott House museum established.
- 1996 - Riley Museum of African American History and Culture established.
- 1997 - City website online (approximate date).
- 2000 - Florida State University's Local Governance Research Laboratory established.

== 21st century ==
- 2010 - Population: 181,376.
- 2012 - Integrity Florida government watchdog headquartered in city.
- 2014 - Andrew Gillum becomes mayor.
- 2017 - Neal Dunn becomes U.S. representative for Florida's 2nd congressional district and Al Lawson becomes U.S. representative for Florida's 5th congressional district

== Gallery ==
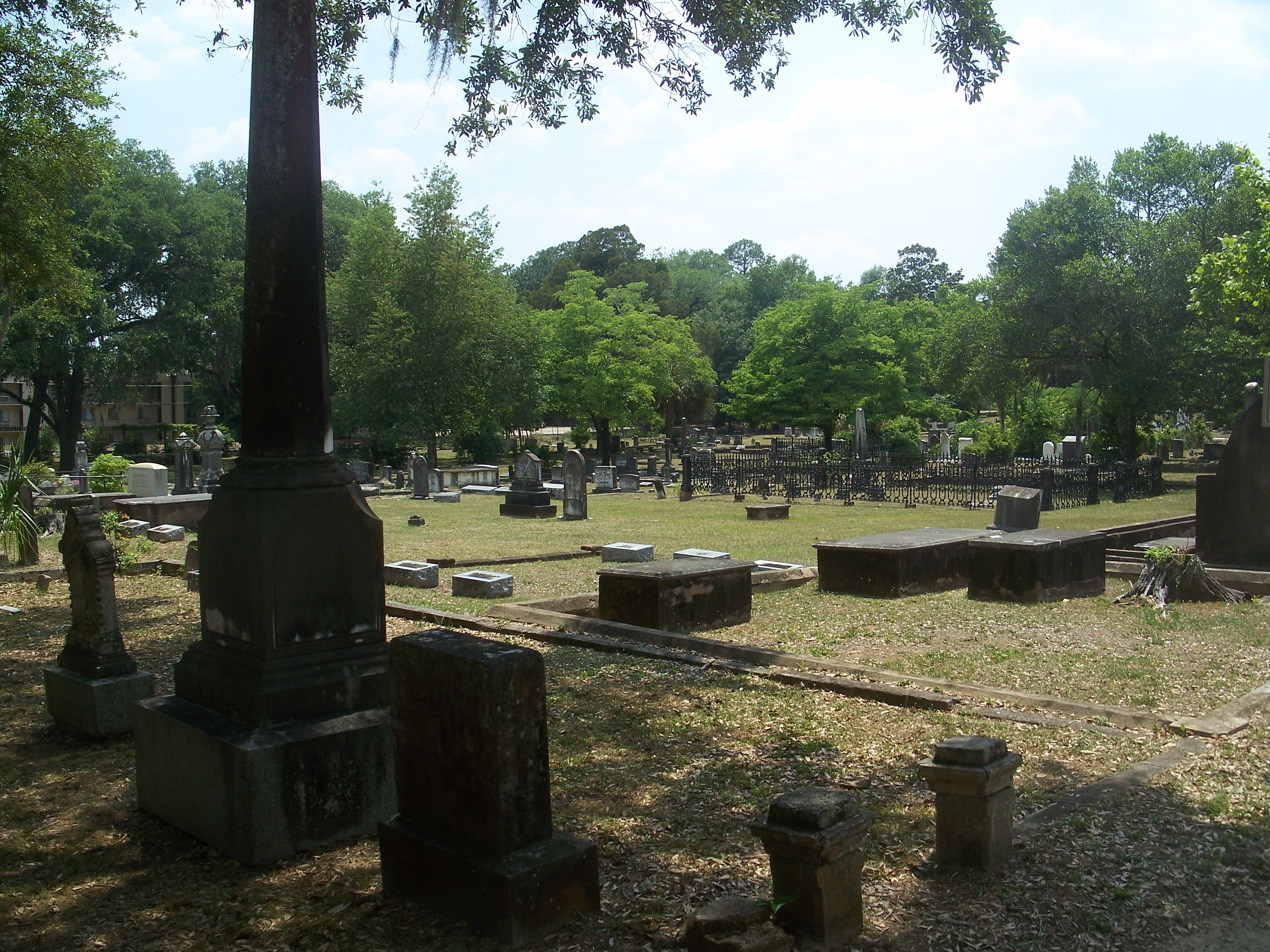
Old City Cemetery, laid out in 1841 (photo 2011)

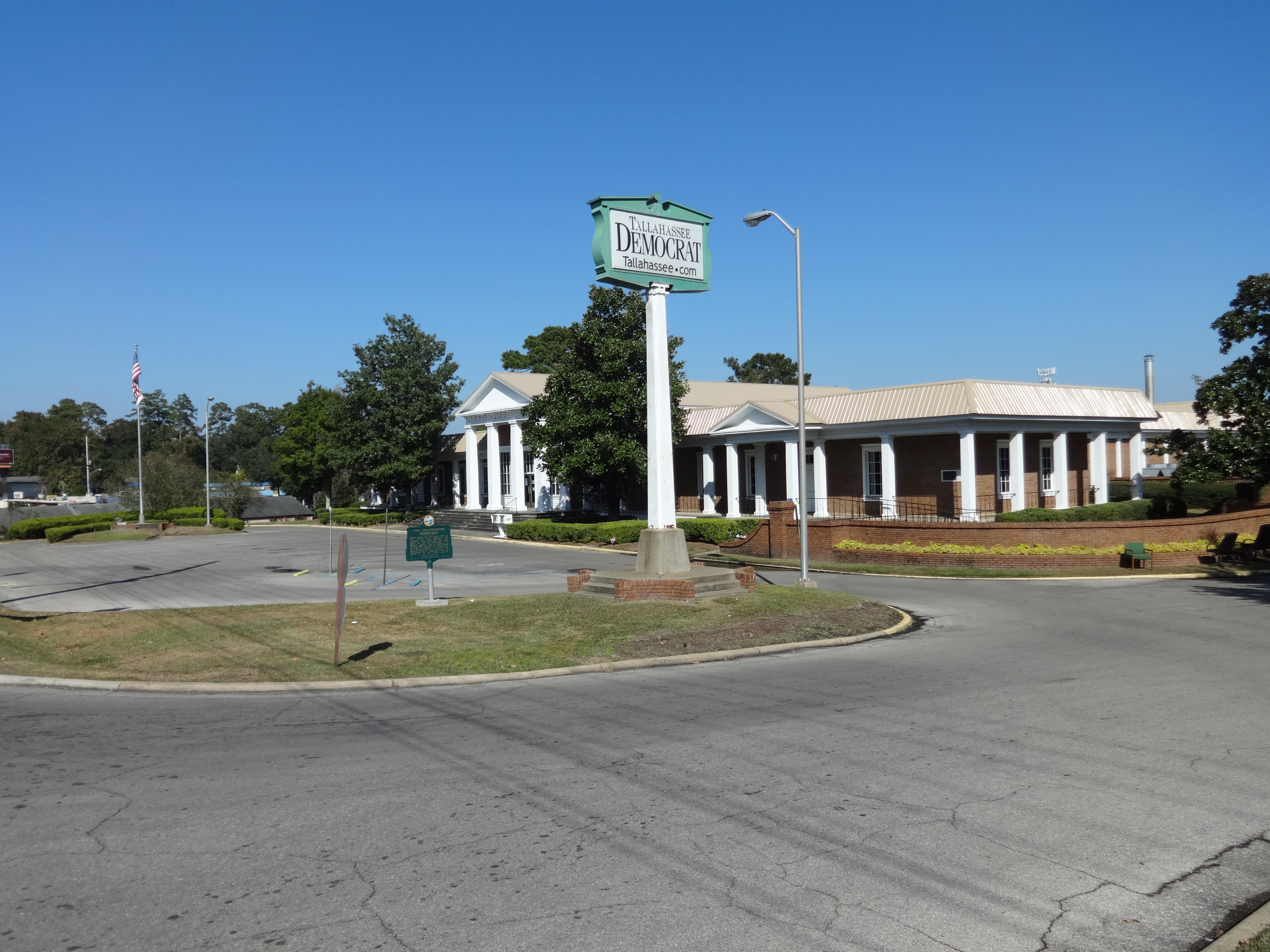
Office of Tallahassee Democrat newspaper, launched in 1905 (photo 2014)

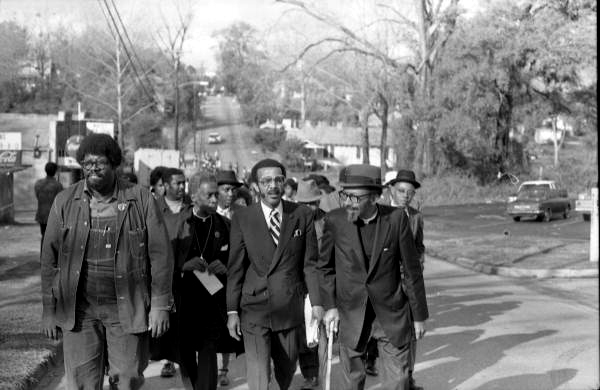
Civil rights march in Tallahassee, 1971

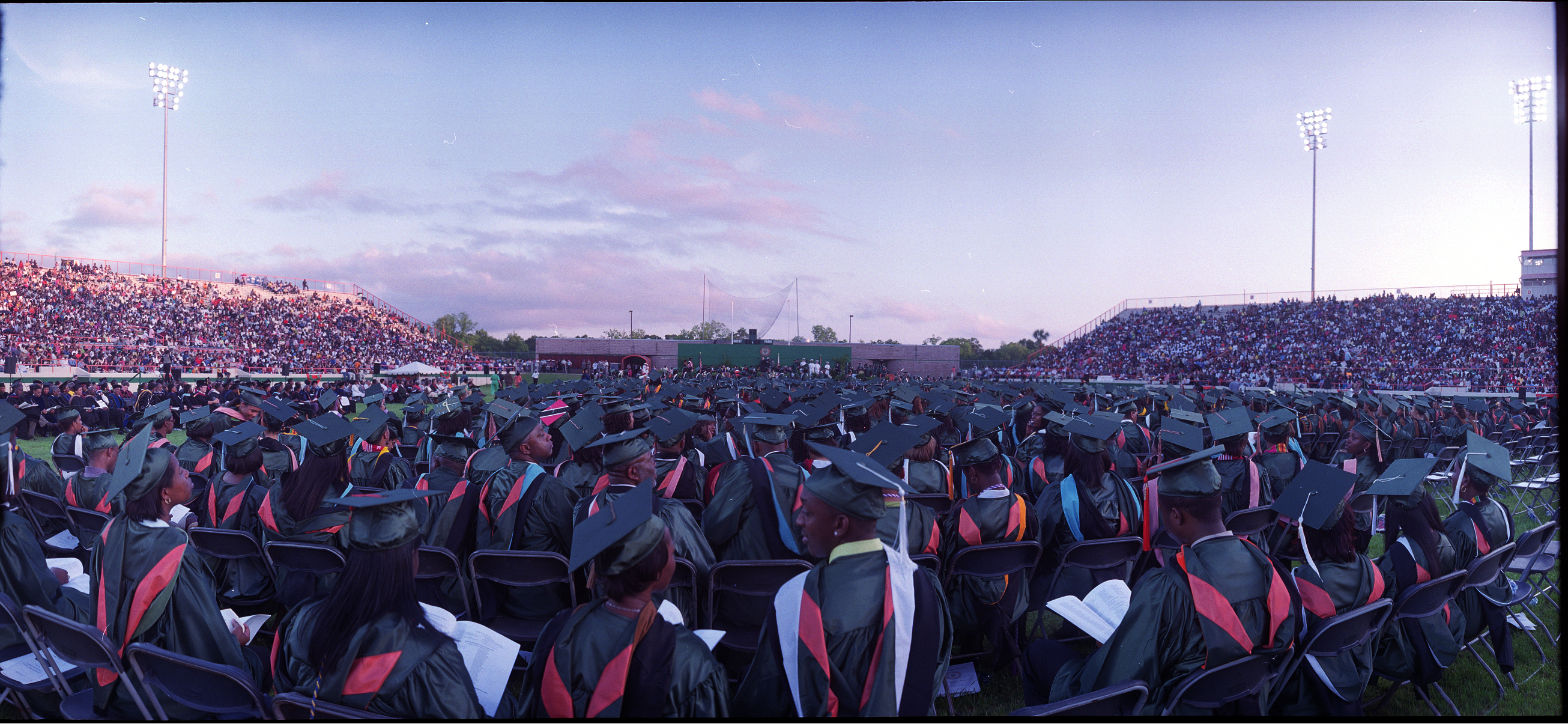
Florida A&M University graduation ceremony, 2003. School opened in 1887

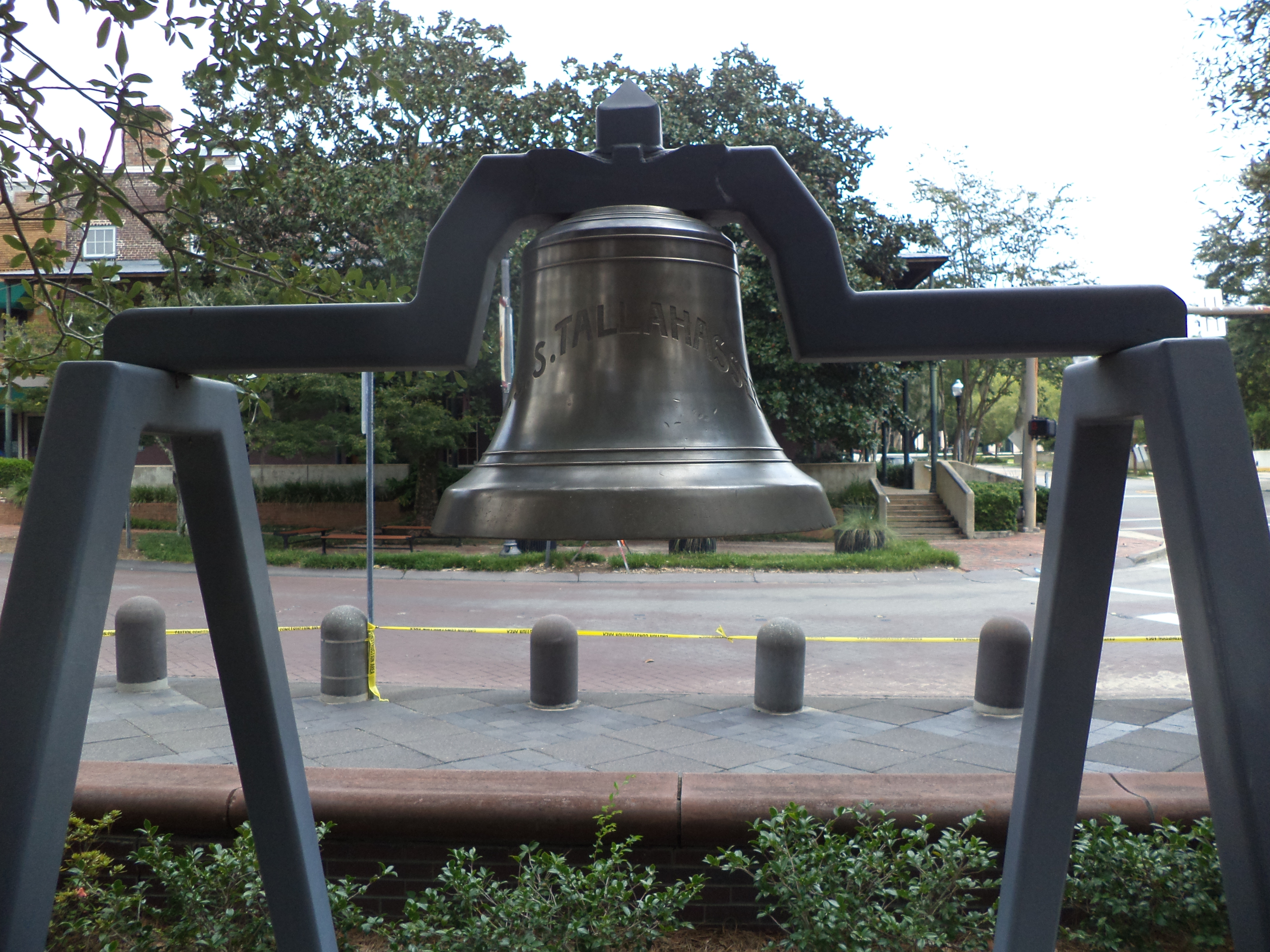
Bell of defunct 1901 ship USS Tallahassee, moved to city hall in 2010

== See also ==
- History of Tallahassee, Florida
- List of mayors of Tallahassee, Florida
- National Register of Historic Places listings in Leon County, Florida
- Timelines of other cities in the North Florida area of Florida: Gainesville, Jacksonville, Pensacola

== Bibliography ==
- Daniel G. Brinton (1869). "Tallahassee". Guide-Book of Florida and the South. Bicentennial Floridiana facsimile series. Philadelphia: George Maclean. hdl:2027/ufl2.uf00103284_00001. ISBN 9780813004150 – via HathiTrust. (1978 facsimile ed. by University of Florida)
- John R. Richards, ed. (1886). "Tallahassee". Florida State Gazetteer and Business Directory. New York: South Publishing Company. OCLC 12186532.
- "Tallahassee". Florida Gazetteer and Business Directory 1907-1908. R. L. Polk & Co. 1907.
- "Tallahassee". Florida State Gazetteer and Business Directory. R. L. Polk & Co. 1918.
- Federal Writers’ Project (1939). "Tallahassee". Florida: a Guide to the Southernmost State. American Guide Series. New York: Oxford University Press. pp. 274–282. ISBN 9781623760090 – via Google Books.
- Althemese Barnes; Ann Roberts (2000). Tallahassee, Florida. Black America. Charleston, South Carolina: Arcadia.
- Julianne Hare (2002). Tallahassee: a Capital City History. Charleston, South Carolina: Arcadia. ISBN 978-0-7385-2371-2.
- Paul T. Hellmann (2006). "Florida: Tallahassee". Historical Gazetteer of the United States. Taylor & Francis. ISBN 1-135-94859-3.
- Gerald Ensley (August 6, 2016), "The Florida Capitol: a Timeline", Tallahassee Democrat
