= Alachua County Public Schools =

Public school district in Florida, US

Coordinates: 29.657°N 82.302°W

Location
- 620 E University Ave, Gainesville, FL Florida United States

District information
- Type: Local school district
- Grades: Pre-K through 12
- Superintendent: Kamela Patton
- Schools: 64
- NCES District ID: 4807890

Students and staff
- Students: 29,845
- Teachers: 1,532
- Student–teacher ratio: 19.47

Other information
- Website: www.alachuaschools.net

Alachua County Public Schools is a public school district serving all of Alachua County in North Central Florida. It serves approximately 29,845 students in 64 schools and centers.

The district is governed by the School Board of Alachua County, which is made up of five board members elected at large who serve staggered, four-year terms.

In 2015, the district's average SAT score of 1620 was the highest in the state of Florida and above the national average. The districtwide passing rate on Advanced Placement exams was 63%, higher than state, national and global passing rates on the exams, which reflect college-level material. Five of the district's six traditional high schools were ranked on The Washington Post's 2015 High School Challenge Index, placing them among the top high schools in the nation. The district also received the What Parents Want Award from SchoolMatch, the nation's largest school selection consulting firm. About 16% of school districts nationwide receive the award each year.

The district offers several magnet programs for students at the elementary, middle and high school levels. It also has thirteen career-tech high school magnet programs in fields such as healthcare, biotechnology, culinary arts and emergency services.

There are approximately 4,000 employees of Alachua County Public Schools. About half of them are teachers. Each school has a nurse on campus full-time. School resource officers/deputies are also assigned to all schools.

== History ==
The Alachua County Board of Public Instruction was established in 1869. Prior to that year, there had been no publicly supported schools in the county. The Board of County Commissioners had provided for the payment of tuition to private schools for students whose families could not afford the tuition, but few families were willing to be seen as paupers and receive the aid. In 1866, the state-supported East Florida Seminary, which had been in Ocala until it closed early in the Civil War, was re-opened in Gainesville using the facilities of the private Gainesville Academy. The next year the Union Academy, a school for African-Americans sponsored by the Freedmen's Bureau, opened in Gainesville. By 1870, there were 22 schools in Alachua County, each with its own board of trustees. The schools were integrated and therefore unpopular with most of the white population. Funding was low and the schools were poorly equipped and short of qualified teachers.

The Compromise of 1877, which marked the end of Reconstruction, left the Alachua County school system under the control of white Democrats. A segregated public school system was established, with most of the available resources going to white schools. The change in control of the schools brought a cut in spending, and the school year for county-supported schools, which had been five months long, was reduced to three months. The Union Academy, however, remained in session for six months a year, and then operated another two months as a normal school training African-American teachers.

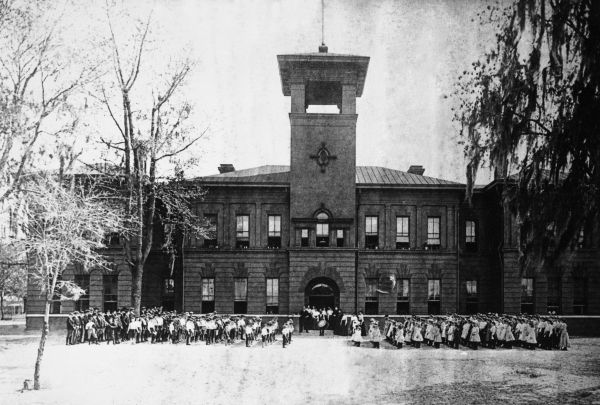
Kirby-Smith Elementary, photographed c. 1900

For many years public schools in Alachua County met in old houses or other rented spaces. The first building in the county erected specifically for use as a district school was in Gainesville in 1885. The Gainesville Graded and High School was built in 1900. With additions over the years, it has been known as Eastside Elementary and Kirby Smith Elementary. The building eventually became the administrative headquarters of the school district, designated the Kirby Smith Center, and since 2017, the Alachua County Public Schools District Office.

The high school classes of the Gainesville Graded and High School moved to a new building, designated as Gainesville High School, in 1923. That same year the Lincoln School opened, replacing the Reconstruction-era Union Academy. Gainesville High School was moved to a new building in 1955. Gainesville High School was integrated in 1970 and Lincoln High School was closed, leaving Gainesville High School as the only high school in Gainesville.

In northwestern Alachua County, a school was opened in 1895 in the new community of Alachua. A new building for the school opened in 1901. Over the next few years schools in the neighboring communities of Newnansville, Haynsworth, Greenleaf, Hague, Gracy, Perseverance, Spring Hill, Santa Fe, Bland and LaCrosse were closed and the students moved to the Alachua school. In 1917, the high school classes were moved to a new building. In 1955, Alachua High School was combined with High Springs High School as Santa Fe High School.

=== Desegregation ===
Public schools in Alachua County were racially segregated from the end of Reconstruction in 1877. In response to the ruling of the U.S. Supreme Court in Brown v. Board of Education, the Alachua County Public Schools Board was ordered by the courts to operate a freedom of choice system starting in 1964, when there were eleven all-black schools in the district. In 1969, there were still eight all-black and three all-white schools in the district. That year, the U.S. Supreme Court decided, in Alexander v. Holmes County Board of Education, that public schools must be immediately fully desegregated. A district appeals court order established a biracial committee to advise the school board on a desegregation plan. When the school board refused to forward the committee's recommended plan to the courts, the committee submitted it directly to the court, which ordered it to be implemented. Students were assigned to schools so that each school had a 70% white - 30% black ratio. Three elementary schools and Lincoln High School were closed.

=== 2020s ===
In 2021, the district chose to implement a mask mandate despite Florida governor Ron DeSantis prohibiting local school districts from doing so. The conflict brought national attention and led the Florida Board of Education to take action against the Alachua County School Board, including financial penalties. The district subsequently became the first in the nation to receive a U.S. Education Department grant to cover the cost of garnished wages for school board members who voted for mask requirements and other COVID-19 mitigation measures.

== Schools ==
The district has 48 schools including 31 elementary schools, 9 middle schools, 8 high schools, two special education centers (Sidney Lanier School and A. Quinn Jones Center), an early childhood center (Duval Early Learning Academy), a family services center (Fearnside Family Services Center) and an environmental education center (Camp Crystal Lake). The School Board of Alachua County also operates the virtual, online Alachua eSchool. Private, for-profit, and charter schools are not administered by the School Board of Alachua County and are not included in these lists.

=== Elementary schools ===
Elementary schools in the county run from pre-kindergarten to fifth grade unless otherwise noted.

- Alachua Elementary School (3–5)
- Archer Community School
- Chiles Elementary School
- Carolyn Beatrice Parker Elementary School (K–5)
- Glen Springs Elementary School (K–5)
- Hidden Oak Elementary School
- High Springs Elementary School (K–8)
- Idylwild Elementary School
- Irby Elementary School (PK–2)
- Lake Forest Elementary School
- Littlewood Elementary School
- Meadowbrook Elementary School (K–5)
- Metcalfe Elementary School (1–5)
- Micanopy Area Cooperative School (Charter School)
- Newberry Elementary School (PK–4) (Charter School)
- Norton Elementary School
- Rawlings Elementary School (1–5)
- Shell Elementary School
- Talbot Elementary School
- Terwilliger Elementary School
- Wiles Elementary School (K–5)
- Williams Elementary School (K–5)

=== Middle schools ===
Middle schools in the county run from 6th to 8th grades unless otherwise noted.

- Howard Bishop Middle School
- Fort Clarke Middle School
- Hawthorne Middle School
- High Springs Community School
- Kanapaha Middle School
- Lincoln Middle School
- Mebane Middle School
- Oak View Middle School (5–8)
- Westwood Middle School

=== High schools ===
High schools in the county run from 9th to 12th grades.

- Buchholz High School (Bobcats)
- Eastside High School (Rams)
- Gainesville High School (Purple Hurricanes)
- Hawthorne High School (Hornets)
- Professional Academies Magnet @ Loften High School (Eagles)
- Newberry High School (Panthers)
- Santa Fe High School (Raiders)

== School and facility name controversies ==
=== Alachua County Public Schools District Office ===
The Alachua County Public Schools District Office is in a building that dates back, in part, to the Gainesville Graded and High School, which opened in 1900. When the Gainesville High School moved to a new building in 1923, the facility became the Eastside Elementary School, and later, Kirby Smith Elementary School, named after Edmund Kirby Smith, a general in the Confederate States Army during the American Civil War. On August 27, 2017, following the August 11 and August 12, 2017 Unite the Right rally in Charlottesville, Virginia, the School Board of Alachua County renamed the Kirby Smith Center. At the time of the name change, School Board Chair Robert Hyatt stated that the board considered the name change before the Unite the Right rally.

=== Carolyn Beatrice Parker Elementary School ===
Before June 2020, the school was named JJ Finley Elementary School for Jesse J. Finley, who was a brigadier general in the Confederate States Army during the American Civil War. Removal of Confederate monuments and memorials is motivated by the belief that the monuments glorify white supremacy and memorialize a treasonous government with founding principles based on the perpetuation and expansion of slavery. An opposing belief also exists, that monuments and memorials to Confederates are part of the cultural heritage of the southern United States of America. In August 2017, the School Board of Alachua County acknowledged the Finley legacy as potentially problematic but declined to take action to rename the school. On June 16, 2020, the School Board of Alachua County removed J.J. Finley's name from the school, during international protest associated with the murder of George Floyd. The school board on August 18, 2020, named the school Carolyn Beatrice Parker Elementary. Parker was a Gainesville native who graduated from, and later taught at, Lincoln High School in Gainesville. She worked as a research physicist in the Dayton Project during World War II.

=== Stephen Foster Elementary School ===
Stephen Foster is an American songwriter known primarily for parlor and minstrel music. Some modern interpretations of Foster's compositions consider the compositions to be disparaging to African Americans. Others, however, have argued that Foster unveiled the realities of slavery while also imparting dignity to African Americans in his compositions, especially as he grew as an artist.

=== Sidney Lanier School ===
Sidney Lanier served in the Confederate States Army as a private, and was promoted by the United Daughters of the Confederacy as a poet of the Confederate States of America. As stated in a previous sub-section of this article, removal of Confederate monuments and memorials is motivated by the belief that the monuments glorify white supremacy and memorialize a treasonous government with founding principles based on the perpetuation and expansion of slavery. An opposing belief also exists, that monuments and memorials to Confederates are part of the cultural heritage of the southern United States of America.
