= Timeline of Jacksonville, Florida =

The following is a timeline of the history of the city of Jacksonville, Florida, United States.

== Prior to 20th century ==
- Prior to 1564 - One early map shows a village called Ossachite at the site of what is now downtown Jacksonville; this may be the earliest recorded name for that area.
- 1564 - French Fort Caroline established by René Goulaine de Laudonnière.
- 1565 - Spanish forces take Fort Caroline.
- 1822
  - Settlement named "Jacksonville" to honor Andrew Jackson.
  - Town grid laid out.
  - Jacksonville becomes seat of newly formed Duval County.
- 1832
  - Town incorporated.
  - William J. Mills becomes mayor.
- 1838 - Bethel Baptist Church established.
- 1845 - Florida becomes part of the United States.
- 1846 - October 12: Gale.
- 1857 - City Park created.
- 1858 - Florida, Atlantic & Gulf Central Railroad begins operating.
- 1862 - Town occupied by Union forces.
- 1869 - St. James Hotel built.
- 1871 - Furchgott, Benedict & Co. dry goods store in business.
- 1872 - Cookman Institute established.
- 1873 - Florida Circulating Library active.
- 1875 - Windsor Hotel built.
- 1876
  - Duval High School established.
  - Union Congregational Church built.
- 1877 - Board of Health established.
- 1878 - Library and Literary Association formed.
- 1881 - Florida Daily Times begins publication.
- 1882
  - Synagogue dedicated.
  - Florida Baptist Academy established.
- 1884 - Board of Trade organized.
- 1885 - Park Opera House in business.
- 1886 - Boylan Industrial Home and school established.
- 1887
  - Yellow fever epidemic.
  - The Metropolis newspaper begins publication.
  - St. Andrew's Episcopal Church built.
- 1888 - Subtropical Exposition held.
- 1890 - Population: 17,201.
- 1892 - Edward Waters College active.
- 1893 - Streetcars began operating.
- 1897 - Woman's Club founded.
- 1900 -
  - "Lift Every Voice and Sing" song first performed.
  - Population: 28,429.

== 20th century ==
=== 1900s-1950s ===
- 1901
  - May 3: Great Fire of 1901.
  - Brewster Hospital established.
  - Continental Hotel opens.
- 1903
  - Mason Park opens.
  - Florida Automobile Association organized.
- 1904
  - Lincoln Park opens.
  - First Baptist Church built.
- 1905
  - Jacksonville Free Public Library opens.
  - Protestant Union Revival held.
- 1907
  - Manhattan Beach opens.
  - Dixieland Amusement Park opens in South Jacksonville.
  - South Jacksonville chartered as a city.
- 1908 - Filmmaker Kalem Studios active.
- 1909 - YMCA building constructed.
- 1910
  - Atlantic Boulevard laid out.
  - Population: 57,699.
- 1912
  - St. James Building constructed.
  - City Rotary Club formed.
- 1914 - Jacksonville Zoological Park established.
- 1917
  - National Association for the Advancement of Colored People Jacksonville chapter established.
  - John W. Martin becomes mayor.
- 1920 – Population: 91,558.
- 1921 - St. Johns River Bridge opens.
- 1923 - John T. Alsop becomes mayor.
- 1925
  - Negro Welfare League organized.
  - WJAX radio begins broadcasting.
- 1926 - Carling Hotel opens.
- 1927 - Florida Theatre and 5 Points Theatre built.
- 1928 - Gator Bowl Stadium built.
- 1929 - Jacksonville Historical Society founded.
- 1930 – Population: 129,549.
- 1934
  - Jacksonville Junior College established.
  - WMBR radio begins broadcasting.
- 1938
  - WJHP radio begins broadcasting.
  - Theatre Jacksonville built.
- 1940
  - U.S. military Naval Air Station Jacksonville commissioned.
  - Population: 173,065.
- 1946 - Annual Gator Bowl college football game begins.
- 1947
  - Jacksonville Urban League formed.
  - Hanna Park created.
- 1949
  - WJXT (television) begins broadcasting.
  - W. Haydon Burns becomes mayor.
- 1950 - Population: 204,517.
- 1953 - Mathews Bridge opens.
- 1955 - Jacksonville Expressway Authority established.
- 1957 - WFGA-TV (television) begins broadcasting.

=== 1960s-1990s ===
- 1960
  - August: "Ax Handle Saturday" racial unrest.
  - Population: 201,030.
- 1962 - Civic Auditorium opens.
- 1963 - December, Hotel Roosevelt fire
- 1964 - September 10, Hurricane Dora occurs.
- 1967
  - Hart Bridge opens.
  - Mary Singleton and Sallye B. Mathis became the first female African Americans elected to the City Council.
- 1968
  - Consolidation of city and Duval County governments.
  - Hans Tanzler becomes mayor.
- 1970 - Population: 528,865.
- 1973 - Florida Municipal Home Rule Powers Act ratified. (Note: In Florida "'municipal home rule' power does not extend to fiscal home rule, however, because the state reserves all taxing authority to itself.")
- 1979 - Jake Godbold becomes mayor.
- 1980
  - Foreign trade zone established.
  - Population: 540,920.
- 1984 - Jacksonville Bulls football team formed.
- 1989 - The Jacksonville Skyway begins operating
- 1990 - Population: 635,230.
- 1993 - Corrine Brown becomes U.S. representative for Florida's 3rd congressional district.
- 1995
  - Jacksonville Jaguars football team formed.
  - Jacksonville Municipal Stadium opens.
  - John Delaney becomes mayor.
- 1998 - City website online (approximate date).
- 2000
  - "Better Jacksonville Plan" for urban growth approved.
  - Population: 735,617.

== 21st century ==
- 2001 - Ander Crenshaw becomes U.S. representative for Florida's 4th congressional district.
- 2003 - May 13: Jacksonville mayoral election, 2003 held; John Peyton wins.
- 2010 - Population: 821,784.
- 2011 - March 22: Jacksonville mayoral election, 2011 held; Alvin Brown wins. He was the city's first elected African-American mayor.
- 2013 - Corrine Brown becomes U.S. representative for Florida's 3rd congressional district again.
- 2015 - Lenny Curry becomes mayor.
- 2022 - Jacksonville celebrates its bicentennial.
- 2023
  - May 16 - 2023 Jacksonville mayoral election; Donna Deegan wins, becomes the city's first female mayor.
  - August 26 - Mass shooting at a Jacksonville Dollar General store.

== See also ==
- History of Jacksonville, Florida
- List of mayors of Jacksonville, Florida
- National Register of Historic Places listings in Duval County, Florida
- Timelines of other cities in the North Florida area of Florida: Gainesville, Pensacola, Tallahassee

== Bibliography ==
=== Published in 19th century ===
- Edward H. Hall (1873), "Jacksonville", Appletons' Hand-book of American Travel: the Southern Tour, New York: D. Appleton & Co
- Jacksonville Directory. New York: W.S. Webb & Co. 1876 – via University of North Florida.
- "Jacksonville (Florida)" . Encyclopædia Britannica. Vol. 13 (9th ed.). 1881.
- John L. Edwards (1881), "Jacksonville", Edwards' guide to East Florida, Jacksonville, Fla: Ashmead Bros.
- Varnum (1885). Jacksonville, Florida: a descriptive and statistical report. Jacksonville Board of Trade.
- John R. Richards, ed. (1886). "Jacksonville". Florida State Gazetteer and Business Directory. New York: South Publishing Company. OCLC 12186532.
- W.S. Webb, ed. (1886), Jacksonville and Consolidated Directory – via University of Florida
- George E. Waring, Jr.; U.S. Department of the Interior, Census Office (1887), "Florida: Jacksonville", Report on the Social Statistics of Cities: Southern and the Western States, Washington DC: Government Printing Office, pp. 181–184
- Wanton S. Webb, ed. (1887), Jacksonville and Consolidated Directory
- Joseph W. White (1890), "City of Jacksonville", White's Guide to Florida, Jacksonville, Fla: Dacosta
- "Jacksonville", Rand, McNally & Co.'s handy guide to the southeastern states, Chicago and New York: Rand, McNally & Co., 1899

=== Published in 20th century ===
- Jacksonville and Florida Facts; prepared for the Jacksonville Board of Trade, Jacksonville: H. & W. B. Drew Company, 1906, hdl:2027/nyp.33433007498706, OCLC 1540641
- "Jacksonville". Florida Gazetteer and Business Directory 1907-1908. R. L. Polk & Co. 1907.
  - 1918 ed.
- Jacksonville City Directory. R. L. Polk & Co. 1908.
  - 1918 ed.
  - 1921 ed.
- "Jacksonville (Florida)" . Encyclopædia Britannica. Vol. 15 (11th ed.). 1910. p. 112.
- Thomas Frederick Davis (1911), History of Early Jacksonville, Florida, Jacksonville: The H. & W. B. Drew Company, OCLC 1534543, OL 6537778M
- Jacksonville: A city with a sky line and a water front and the spirit that does things, Jacksonville: Arnold Printing Co., 1913, OCLC 1813903, OL 242620M
- "Jacksonville". Automobile Blue Book. Vol. 6. USA. 1920. Map
- Thomas Frederick Davis (1925). History of Jacksonville, Florida and vicinity 1513 to 1924. St. Augustine, Fla.: Florida Historical Society. OCLC 250419240.
- Pleasant Daniel Gold (1929). History of Duval County. St. Augustine, Fla.: The Record Company – via HathiTrust. (fulltext)
- Federal Writers' Project (1939), "Jacksonville", Florida; a Guide to the Southernmost State, Best Books on, ISBN 9781623760090
- Paul E. Fenlon (October 1953). "The Florida, Atlantic and Gulf Central Railroad: The Railroad in Jacksonville". Florida Historical Quarterly. 32 (2): 71–80. JSTOR 30138953.
- Richard A. Martin (1975). The City Makers. Jacksonville, FL. OCLC 1547826.
- Ory Mazar Nergal, ed. (1980), "Jacksonville", Encyclopedia of American Cities, New York: E.P. Dutton, OL 4120668M
- James B. Crooks (April 1984). "Changing Face of Jacksonville, Florida: 1900-1910". Florida Historical Quarterly. 62 (4): 439–463. JSTOR 30146594.
- James Robertson Ward (1985). Old Hickory's Town: An Illustrated History of Jacksonville. Miller Press. OCLC 8919363.
- James B. Crooks (1991). Jacksonville after the Fire, 1901–1919: A New South City. University of North Florida Press. ISBN 0813010675.
- Kevin M. McCarthy, ed. (1992). "Jacksonville". Book Lover's Guide to Florida. Sarasota: Pineapple Press. pp. 26–49. ISBN 978-1-56164-021-8.
- Susan E. Clarke; Gary L. Gaile (1998). "Cities at Work: Cleveland and Jacksonville". The Work of Cities. Globalization and Community. University of Minnesota Press. pp. 107–150. ISBN 978-0-8166-2892-6.
- Neil L. Shumsky, ed. (1998). "Jacksonville, Florida". Encyclopedia of Urban America: The Cities and Suburbs. ABC-CLIO. ISBN 1849723362.
- Abel A. Bartley (2000). Keeping the Faith: Race, Politics, and Social Development in Jacksonville, Florida, 1940-1970. Greenwood. ISBN 978-0-313-31035-5.

=== Published in 21st century ===
- Jacksonville Historical Society (2001). Jacksonville in Vintage Postcards. Arcadia Publishing. ISBN 978-0-7385-0683-8.
- Don Prues; Jack Heffron (2003). "Jacksonville". Writer's Guide to Places. Cincinnati: Writer's Digest Books. pp. 72–74. ISBN 1-58297-169-2.
- Dorothy K. Fletcher (2015). Historic Jacksonville Theatre Palaces, Drive-ins and Movie Houses. Charleston, SC: History Press. ISBN 978-1-62619-770-1.

== Images ==
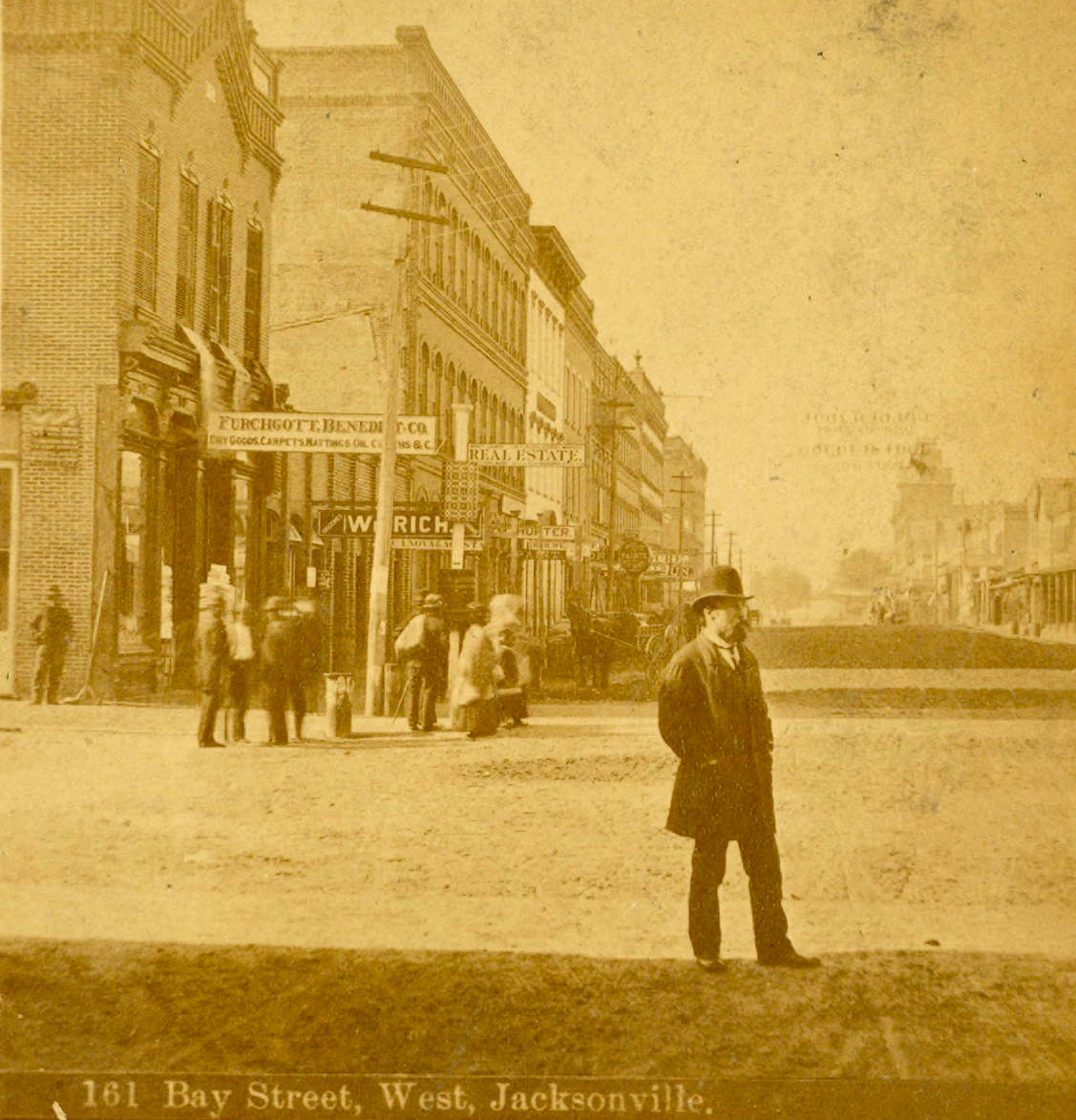
Bay Street, Jacksonville, late 19th c.

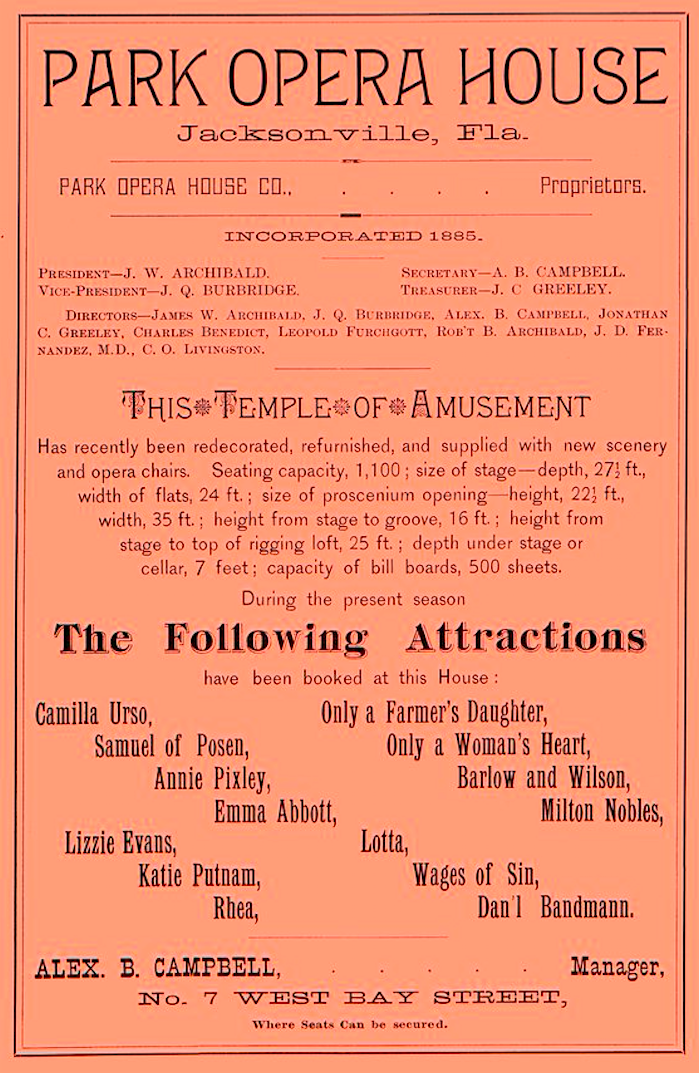
1886 advertisement for Park Opera House (est. 1885)
