= Loften High School =

Coordinates: 29.6519525°N 82.2852122°W

Professional Academies' Magnet @ Loften High School
- 3000 E. University Avenue; Gainesville, Florida, 32641

Information
- Type: Public
- Motto: Prepare Professionally, Advance Academically, Model Maturity!
- School district: Alachua County School District
- Principal: Kristopher Bracewell
- Teaching staff: 15.33 (on FTE basis)
- Grades: 9 to 12
- Enrollment: 310 (2023-2024)
- Student to teacher ratio: 20.22
- Colors: Blue and Gold
- Mascot: Eagle
- Nickname: Loften
- Website: Loften High School

The Professional Academies' Magnet @ Loften High School (or W. Travis Loften High School) is a public high school in Gainesville, Florida in the United States. It is part of Alachua County School District and occupies a 174-acre (0.70 km^{2}) campus in a medium-sized community.

== Overview ==
Loften is a nonzoning, exclusively magnet school or a "school of choice" where students must actively seek the school out and apply. While this ensures the genuine interest of attending students in the offered, often expensive to maintain programs, it also means that Loften has a very small student body. Loften averages around 300 enrolled students. These students are divided among 1-2 dozen teachers in a 4-period block schedule, where they switch all their non-academy classes at the end of the semester.

== Career focus ==
Loften has six career-oriented programs:

- Academy of Automotive Technology
- Academy of Fire and EMS (Firefighting/Emergency Medical Services)
- Academy of Gaming and Mobile App Development
- Academy of Media Production Technology
- Academy of Robotics and Engineering
- Institute of Graphic Art and Design

Discontinued Academies

- Academy of Design and Technology
- Academy of Early Childhood Education
- Academy of Information Technology
- Academy of Horticulture
- Academy of Business

== Administration ==
- Principal: Kristopher Bracewell
- Assistant Principal: Lauren Chandler
- Dean/Behavioral Resources: Dawn Moore
