= Union Academy (Gainesville, Florida) =

Former school for freedmen

The Union Academy was a school founded with the aid of the Freedmen's Bureau in Gainesville, Florida in 1867. It was the first school for African Americans in Gainesville and Alachua County, and provided a free quality education to African Americans when public schools in Alachua County were struggling. The Union Academy was eventually absorbed into the county school system, and remained in operation until 1923.

At the beginning of the Civil War, African Americans, mostly slaves, were 54% of the population in Alachua County, but few lived in Gainesville, only 46 out of a population of 269 in 1860. At the end of the war, in May 1865, a company of the 3rd United States Colored Infantry Regiment were stationed in Gainesville. They were replaced in October by a company of the 34th United States Colored Infantry Regiment. In December the 34th Regiment company was replaced by troops from the 7th Infantry Regiment. The presence of black troops in Gainesville in 1865 encouraged freed men to settle there. At the same time black farm laborers were recruited from Georgia and South Carolina to help harvest what was expected to be a very large cotton crop, but heavy rain ruined the cotton, and the recently arrived blacks were left without work. Black residents soon outnumbered whites in Gainesville, which had had 223 white residents in 1860. By 1870, Gainesville had a population of 1,444, of which 765 were black.

== School opens ==
It had been illegal for slaves to learn to read before the end of the Civil War. The Freedmen's Bureau encouraged the creation of schools for the newly freed slaves, providing plans and building materials, and coordinating funds provided by northern churches and private charities. Two white female teachers from New England were sent to Gainesville in late 1865 by the National Freedmen's Relief Association of New York, with support from the New York Bureau of the Freedmen's Union Commission. They initially taught 60 black students in an unfinished church without windows or doors. The teachers were ostracised by the white community of Gainesville, and white boys harassed the classes they conducted. The school did make progress. The Freedmen's Bureau agent in Gainesville, Joseph Durkee, reported that the ceremonies at the end of the school year in 1867 were attended by some prominent white leaders.

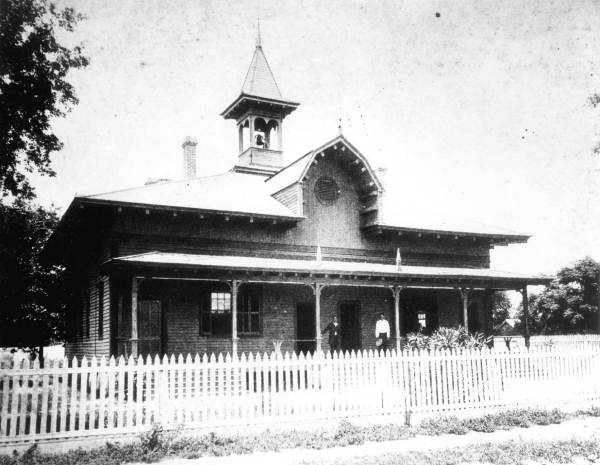
Original Union Academy, 1867–mid-1890s

In the fall of 1867 a group of blacks in Gainesville organized a board of trustees to open a school for freedmen. Property was acquired as the site for the school, which was to be called the Union Academy. Using plans and construction materials provided by the Freedmen's Bureau, the school was built by freedmen who volunteered their labor (the 1870 census found more than a dozen black carpenters in Gainesville). The 70-by-30-foot (21.3 by 9.1 m) building had one floor, and a 50-by-12-foot (15.2 by 3.7 m) "piazza". It was topped by a 17-foot (5.2 m) tall belfry, which was equipped in 1870 with a 40-pound (18 kg) bell. Only one other school built for black students by the Freedmen's Bureau in Florida was larger. Initial furnishings for the school apparently were sparse, although a parlor organ for music lessons was added in 1872.

In 1868 instruction at the Union Academy was divided into primary and grammar departments. The first teachers left the school by 1870, and were replaced by two white teachers sent by the American Missionary Association, with two black assistants. The school was partially supported by the newly organized Alachua County Board of Public Instruction and by the Peabody Education Fund, and was serving 179 students, 8 of whom were above the primary level. While reporting on their success with students, the teachers also complained about inadequate supplies and books, absentee students, and crowded classrooms.

== Public schools ==
There were no publicly supported schools in Gainesville and Alachua County before 1869. White students from families who could afford it attended the Gainesville Academy, a private school. The county commission did provide funds to pay the tuition of students whose families could not afford to do so, and who were not capable of teaching themselves, but few families were willing to be classified as paupers, and school-age children from poor families generally did without formal education.

The Gainesville Academy had 67 students and 3 teachers in 1866. That year, J. H. Roper, who owned the school, offered the school building and grounds to the state if they would move the East Florida Seminary to Gainesville. The Seminary had been established by the state in 1853 in Ocala to serve Florida students from east of the Suwannee River, but it had closed during the Civil War due to lack of funds. The state accepted Roper's offer, and the Seminary was moved to Gainesville. Two other private schools opened in Gainesville within a year, Spencer's Academy, and a school for "young ladies and children."

The Alachua County Board of Public Instruction had been established in 1869, and there were 22 public schools in the county by 1870, but each school had its own board of trustees. Those schools were unpopular with much of the white population. Almost all of the boards of trustees had at least one black member, and the textbooks used were often pro-Union in sentiment. The schools were poorly equipped, lacking many necessities (only 15 schools had brooms), and qualified teachers were hard to find. The county superintendent reported, "About half the school buildings in use are comfortable and convenient."

Republicans, including blacks, held many elected offices in Florida during Reconstruction, but by 1877 white Democrats were regaining control in the state, including the Alachua County school system. Support for the Union Academy from the Freedmen's Bureau and most northern charities had dried up by 1874 (some support from the Peabody Fund continued until 1882). The white public had begun to accept that attending free public schools was not a sign of paupery. A segregated public school system was established, with most of the available resources going to white schools. The change in control of the schools brought a cut in spending, and the school year for county supported schools, which had been five months long, was reduced to three months.

In contrast, the Union Academy had "well-educated teachers", was in session for eight months of the year, (Note: A report in 1893 indicated that the primary and grammar sections of the school were in session for six months, and the Academy functioned as a free normal school for teachers for another two months.) and was the only public school in the county with students divided into grades and using standard textbooks. The Union Academy received $3,000.00 a year from the state for support of the normal department. The last white teachers had left the school in 1873, and it had an all-black staff after that. Graduates of the Academy's normal department also taught in the black schools throughout Alachua County.

== Expansion ==
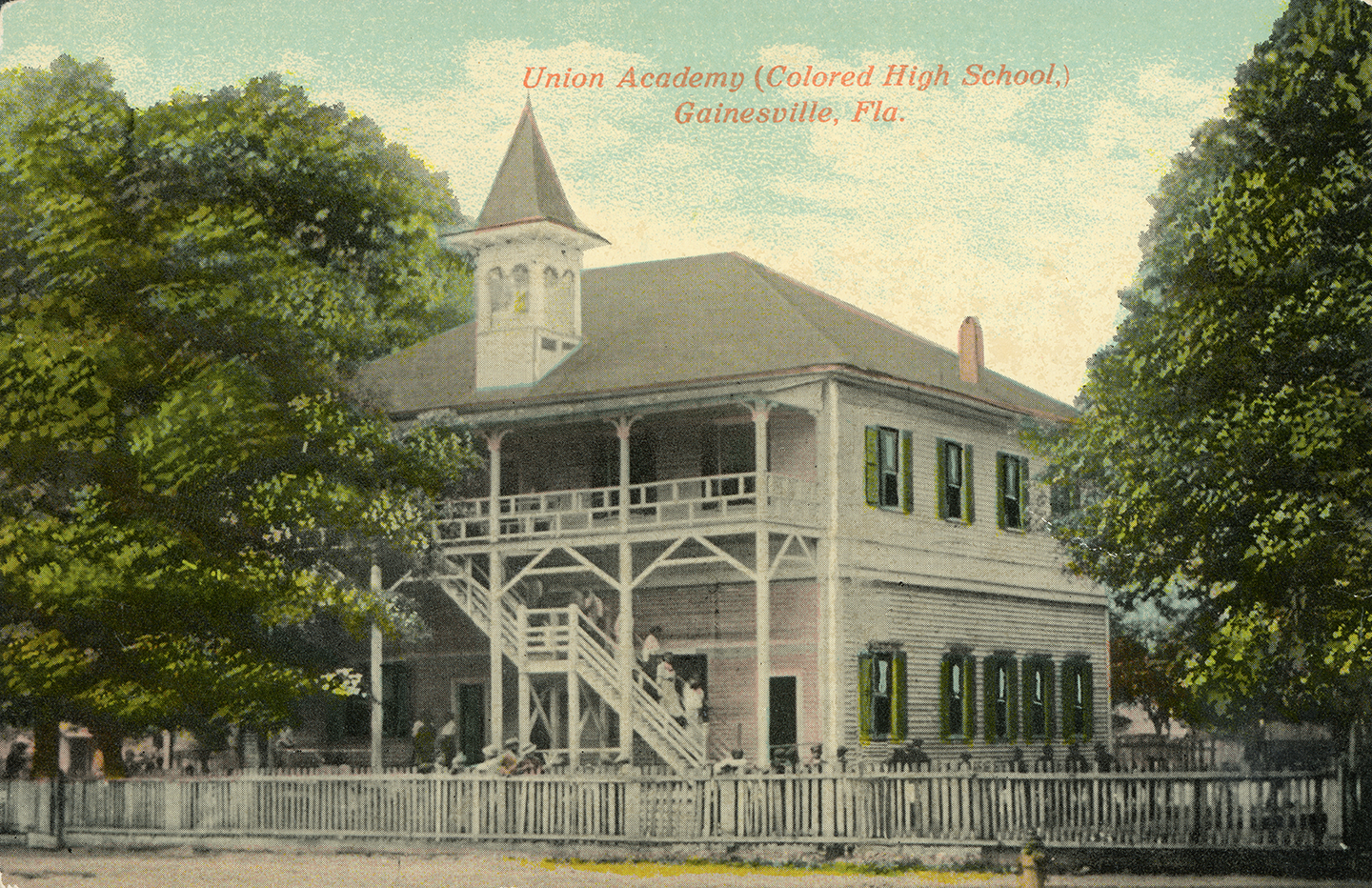
Enlarged Union Academy, mid 1890s–1923

A bond issue was approved by the voters of Gainesville in 1883 to fund improvements at the East Florida Seminary (which was a state school, not under the county school system) and the Union Academy. The bond issue was not popular with white voters, but was carried with support from black voters. As the city could not spend funds on property it did not own, the trustees of the Union Academy sold it to the city for $2,000, which was spent on repairs and improvements to the school needed to expand the normal department. The East Florida Seminary received $6,000 from the bond issue, which was used on construction of a new building. In the mid-1890s a second story was added to the Union Academy building, at a cost of $1,100. The school now had eleven classrooms and could hold 700 students. By 1903 a neighboring house had been added to the school for the primary department. Electric lights had been installed in the main school building by 1919, but the primary department building still used kerosene lights.

In 1920 another bond issue was passed for the construction of two new high schools in Gainesville, one for whites and one for blacks. Both were built of brick, were of similar size, and had similar features. By 1922 the Union Academy was serving 500 students in grades 1–9 with eleven teachers under Principal A. Quinn Jones. The new high school, Lincoln High School was completed in 1923, and the privies from the old school were moved to the new school that summer.
