= A. Quinn Jones House =

History museum in Gainesville, Florida

- U.S. National Register of Historic Places
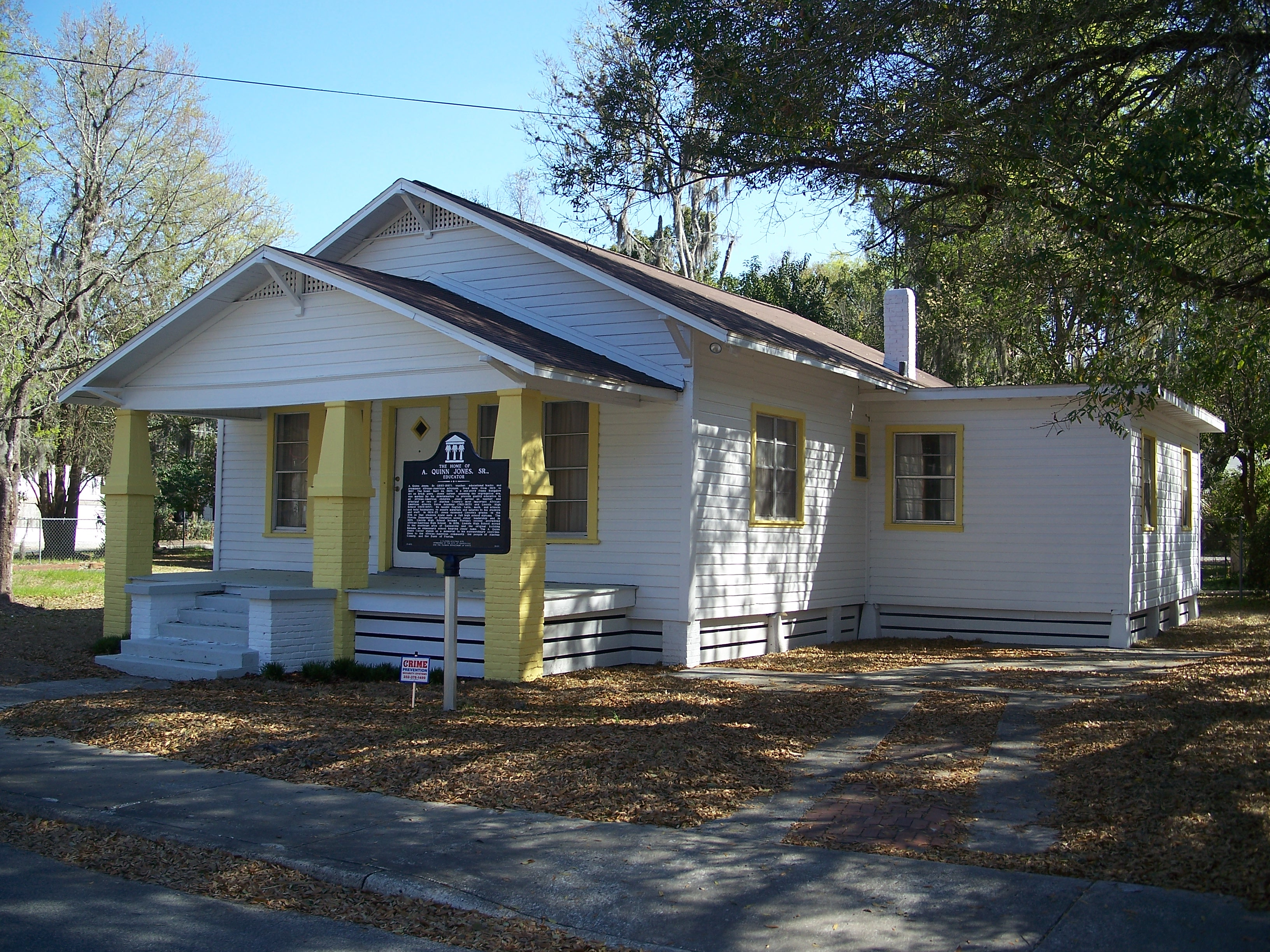

- Location within Florida Location within the United States
- Location: 1013 N.W. 7th Ave., Gainesville, Florida
- Coordinates: 29°39′32″N 82°20′7″W
- Area: less than one acre
- Built: 1925
- Architectural style: Frame Vernacular
- NRHP reference No.: 09001278
- Added to NRHP: January 27, 2010

The A. Quinn Jones Museum and Cultural Center is a museum in Gainesville, Florida. The museum preserves the legacy of Allen Quinn Jones (1893–1994), a local educator who dedicated his life to educating African-Americans.

== History ==
=== Private house ===
The house originally belonged to the family of A. Quinn Jones. Jones became the first principal of Lincoln High School (Gainesville, Florida) and held a long career there.

=== High school ===
Jones developed the house into the second fully accredited African-American high school in the state of Florida.

=== Museum ===
The house is now a museum honoring Jones. Known as the A. Quinn Jones Museum & Cultural Center, it features exhibits that detail the history of African Americans in Gainesville and Alachua County during the Civil Rights Movement.

The museum was temporarily closed to the public during the COVID-19 pandemic.

=== Designation as a historic place ===
The house was added to the National Register of Historic Places on January 27, 2010.

== See also ==
- National Register of Historic Places listings in Florida
- List of museums in Florida
