= Confederate monument (Gainesville, Florida) =

- Old Joe
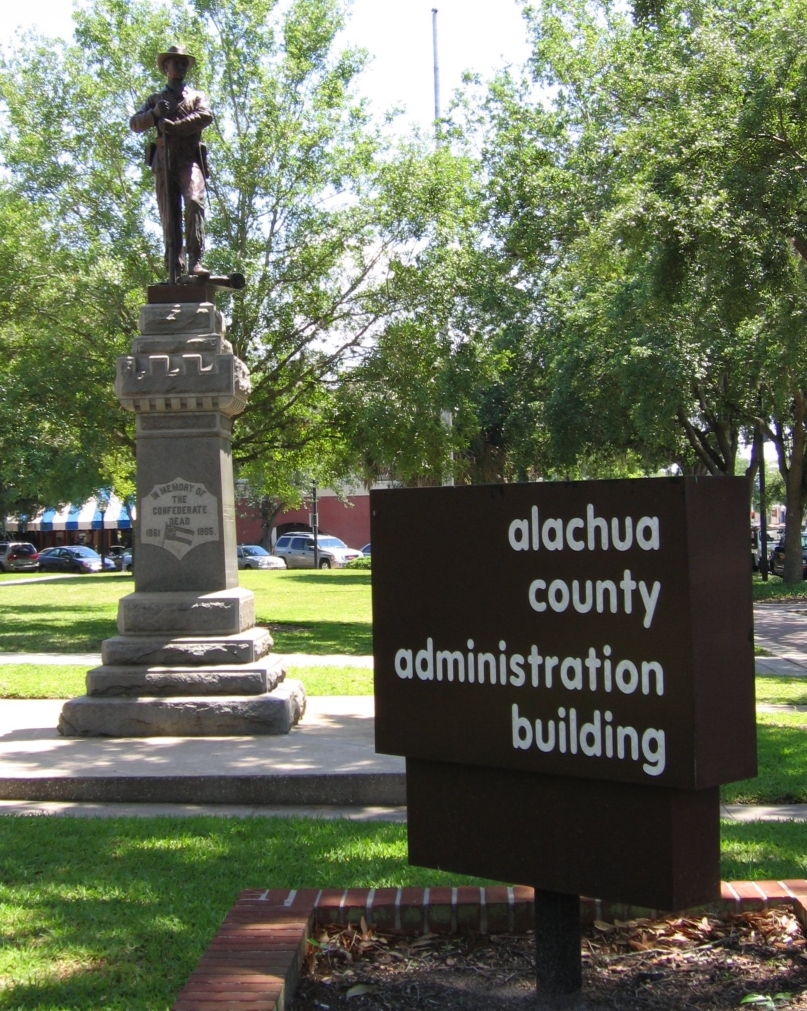
- Old Joe at its former location, 2005
- Artist: John Segesman
- Year: 1904
- Location: Gainesville, Florida, United States (formerly)
- 29.5596°N 82.2583°W
- Owner: United Daughters of the Confederacy

The Confederate monument, also known as Old Joe, is a historic statue in Gainesville, Florida, in the United States. Designed by John Segesman, it was dedicated by the United Daughters of the Confederacy outside the Alachua County Administration Building in 1904. It was moved to Oak Ridge Cemetery in Micanopy, Florida, a privately owned cemetery in rural Alachua County on August 14, 2017.

== Description ==
The statue, designed by John Segesman, depicts a soldier of the Confederate States Army, the Southern army during the American Civil War of 1861–1865.

According to the Smithsonian Institution Research Information System, he is seen "standing with his proper left leg forward and his proper left foot resting on a camp pack with a bed roll. He is holding the top of a musket with both hands, proper right hand above proper left hand while the musket base is on the ground. The soldier wears a sword scabbard on his proper left hip (no sword is apparent), and a pouch on his back side that is attached by a shoulder strap over his proper right shoulder. On his proper right hip is a rectangular box attached to a strap that is over his proper left shoulder and a small semi-circular pouch is attached to his belt on the proper right side."

== History ==
The monument was dedicated by the Kirby Smith chapter of the United Daughters of the Confederacy (UDC) outside the Alachua County Administration Building on January 19, 1904. There were speeches by Judge Horatio Davis and Hon. W. L. Palmer, followed by Confederate General Robert Bullock. The monument was unveiled by Mrs McKinstry, Jr., and "the attendance was quite large."

On August 14, 2017, in the wake of the Unite the Right rally in Charlottesville, Virginia, the statue was moved to the Oak Ridge Cemetery, a privately owned cemetery near Rochelle, Florida, by the UDC.
