= Florida State University College of Social Sciences and Public Policy =

- Type: Public
- Established: 1973
- Dean: Dean Tim Chapin
- Students: 4,684
- Location: Tallahassee, Florida, U.S. 30°26′35.9″N 84°17′45.0″W
- Website: www.cosspp.fsu.edu

The Florida State University College of Social Sciences and Public Policy (COSSPP), located in Tallahassee, Florida, is one of fifteen colleges comprising Florida State University (FSU). The college was founded in 1973 and includes six departments: Economics, Geography, Political Science, Sociology, Urban and Regional Planning and the Askew School of Public Administration and Policy, along with interdisciplinary programs in African American Studies, Demography, International Affairs, Interdisciplinary Social Science, Environment & Society, and Public Health.

The college also contains the following centers and institutes: Center for Demography and Population Health, Center for Disaster Risk Policy, Civil Rights Institute at Florida State University, The Claude Pepper Center, DeVoe L. Moore Center for the Study of Critical Issues in Economic Policy and Government, Florida Center for Public Management, Florida Public Affairs Center, L. Charles Hilton Jr. Center for the Study of Economic Prosperity and Individual Opportunity, LeRoy Collins Institute, Osher Lifelong Learning Institute, Pepper Institute on Aging and Public Policy, Stavros Center for Economic Education, and William H. Kerr Intercultural Education and Dialogue Initiative.

The college is home to 110 faculty members.

All departments offer professional master's degrees. Ph.D. degrees are offered in Economics, Geography, Political Science, Public Administration and Policy, Sociology, and Urban and Regional Planning. The Departments of Economics, Political Science, and Accounting have also formed the Experimental Social Science Research Group (XS/FS) to study individual and group decision making.

In the 2018-2019 academic year, the college's enrollment was 4,684, with 4,064 undergraduates and 620 graduate students, making it the third-largest college in the university. In the 2017-2018 academic year, 1,812 degrees were conferred: 1,526 bachelor's degrees, 264 master's, and 22 doctoral.
