= Lincoln High School (Gainesville, Florida) =

Historic school in Gainesville, Florida, United States

Coordinates: 29.6580°N 82.3354°W

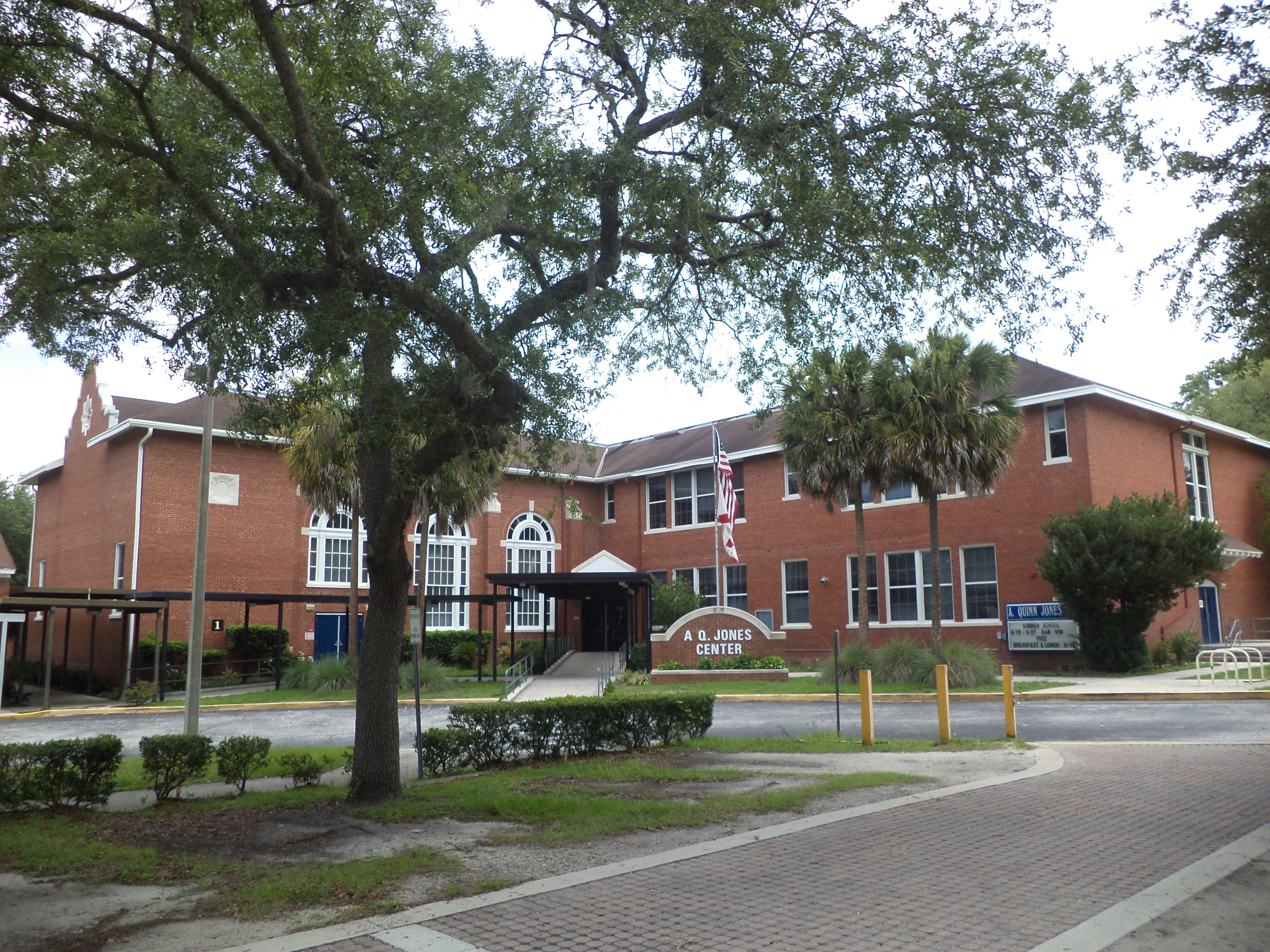
A. Quinn Jones Center school in 2013, originally the first Lincoln High School

Lincoln High School was a public high school for African American students in Gainesville, Florida during the segregation era. It replaced the Union Academy, founded with support from the Freedmen's Bureau in 1867. Lincoln High School was built in 1923 at Northwest 7th Avenue. When it was first constructed it only served grades 1–11, but the principal A. Quinn Jones campaigned for it to serve through grade 12 so students could graduate with diplomas and continue on to attend college or universities. In 1926, Jones succeeded in persuading the county board, and Lincoln High School became the second fully accredited African-American High School in the state of Florida. The A. Quinn Jones House is preserved as a museum honoring his legacy.

A new school was built for Lincoln High School in 1956 in response to the Supreme Court of the United States decision in the case of Brown v. Board of Education calling for an end to segregation. Instead of integrating the county built an "equal" school for blacks at SE 12 Street, what is now Lincoln Middle School. The original 1923 Lincoln High School building is now the A. Quinn Jones Center.

== Protest ==
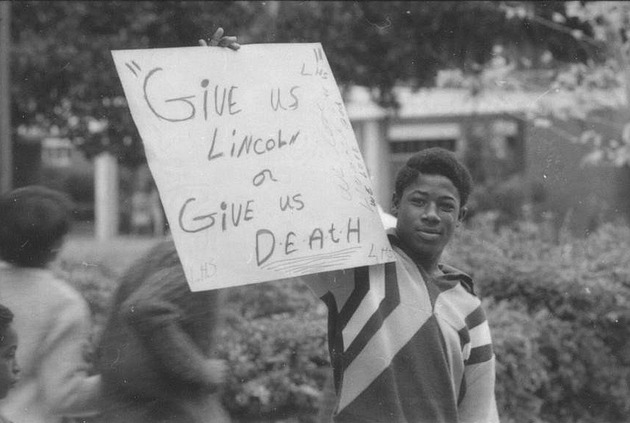
Photograph of a student of Lincoln High School in 1968.

In November 1969, the Fifth Judicial Circuit Court of Florida ordered all county boards to either desegregate schools or close. Black residents in Gainesville protested the closing of Lincoln High School and all but about 70 students boycotted. A riot broke out on January 31, 1970. Principal John Dukes kept the school open as long as he could. Two teachers were hospitalized, there were 91 broken windows in the surrounding area, and Gainesville Police made 17 arrests during the day. In response to the event, Alachua County closed all schools in the district for four days.

== See also ==
- Gainesville High School
