= Askew School of Public Administration and Policy =

Public policy school of Florida State University

Coordinates: 30.4434°N 84.2958°W

- Type: Public
- Established: 1947
- Dean: Keon-Hyung Lee (director)
- Location: Tallahassee, Florida, U.S.
- Website: www.askew.fsu.edu

The Askew School of Public Administration and Policy, located in Tallahassee, Florida, is a graduate school within the Florida State University College of Social Sciences. The School was founded in 1947 and offers eight specializations within the MPA, as well as joint degree programs with Urban and Regional Planning, Social Work, Criminology and Criminal Justice, and the Florida State University College of Law. It was renamed in honor of the former governor, Reubin Askew.

== National rankings ==
U.S. News & World Report (2020 edition)

- Public Affairs - 25th overall
- Local Government Management - 11th overall
- Public Management and Leadership- 18th overall
- Public Finance and Budgeting - 20th overall

The Askew School now offers an online MPA degree to allow greater flexibility to students or those in the workforce seeking ways to stay competitive.
