= National Register of Historic Places listings in Alachua County, Florida =

Location of Alachua County in Florida

This is a list of the National Register of Historic Places listings in Alachua County, Florida.

This is intended to be a complete list of the properties and districts on the National Register of Historic Places in Alachua County, Florida, United States. The locations of National Register properties and districts for which the latitude and longitude coordinates are included below, may be seen in a map.

There are 68 properties and districts listed on the National Register in the county, including two National Historic Landmarks and one former listing.

This National Park Service list is complete through NPS recent listings posted October 2, 2026.

Contents: Counties in Florida (non-linked contain no National Register listings)
Alachua - Baker - Bay - Bradford - Brevard - Broward - Calhoun - Charlotte - Citrus - Clay - Collier - Columbia - DeSoto - Dixie - Duval - Escambia - Flagler - Franklin - Gadsden - Gilchrist - Glades - Gulf - Hamilton - Hardee - Hendry - Hernando - Highlands - Hillsborough (Tampa) - Holmes - Indian River - Jackson - Jefferson - Lafayette - Lake - Lee - Leon - Levy - Liberty - Madison - Manatee - Marion - Martin - Miami-Dade (Miami) - Monroe - Nassau - Okaloosa - Okeechobee - Orange - Osceola - Palm Beach - Pasco - Pinellas - Polk - Putnam - St. Johns - St. Lucie - Santa Rosa - Sarasota - Seminole - Sumter - Suwannee - Taylor - Union - Volusia - Wakulla - Walton - Washington

== Current listings ==
	Name on the Register	Image	Date listed	Location	City or town	Description
1	Anderson Hall	Anderson Hall	June 27, 1979 (#79000652)	West University Avenue; 29°39′05″N 82°20′32″W	Gainesville	
2	Axline House	Axline House	May 5, 2015 (#15000207)	18507 S. Cty. Rd. 325; 29°29′00″N 82°09′32″W	Hawthorne vicinity	
3	Maj. James B. Bailey House	Maj. James B. Bailey House	December 5, 1972 (#72000301)	1121 Northwest 6th Street; 29°39′47″N 82°19′52″W	Gainesville	
4	Baird Hardware Company Warehouse	Baird Hardware Company Warehouse	November 25, 1985 (#85003053)	619 South Main Street; 29°38′39″N 82°19′28″W	Gainesville	
5	Bethlehem Presbyterian Church	Bethlehem Presbyterian Church	February 1, 2018 (#100002065)	16979 SW 137 Ave. 29°31′42″N 82°31′23″W	Archer	
6	Dan Branch House	Dan Branch House	November 12, 2015 (#15000782)	5707 SW. 17 Dr. 29°35′58″N 82°20′35″W	Gainesville	
7	Boulware Springs Water Works	Boulware Springs Water Works	June 20, 1985 (#85001255)	3400 Southeast 15th Street; 29°37′15″N 82°18′25″W	Gainesville	
8	Bryan Hall	Bryan Hall	June 27, 1979 (#79000653)	West University Avenue and 13th Street; 29°39′03″N 82°20′26″W	Gainesville	
9	Buckman Hall	Buckman Hall	January 11, 1974 (#74000609)	Buckman Drive (Southwest 17th Street); 29°39′02″N 82°20′43″W	Gainesville	
10	Church of God by Faith	Church of God by Faith	December 8, 2023 (#100008753)	302 SW 8th Ave. 29°38′41″N 82°19′42″W	Gainesville	
11	City of Alachua Downtown Historic District	City of Alachua Downtown Historic District	July 14, 2000 (#00000787)	Roughly bounded by Northwest 150th Avenue, Northwest 145th Terrace, Northwest 143rd Place, and Northwest 138th Terrace; 29°47′23″N 82°29′41″W	Alachua	
12	Cox Family Log House	Cox Family Log House	May 1, 2017 (#100000931)	1639 NW. 11th Rd. 29°39′46″N 82°20′37″W	Gainesville	
13	Cox Furniture Store	Cox Furniture Store	June 10, 1994 (#94000579)	19 Southeast First Avenue; 29°39′03″N 82°19′28″W	Gainesville	
14	Cox Furniture Warehouse	Cox Furniture Warehouse	June 10, 1994 (#94000580)	602 South Main Street; 29°38′44″N 82°19′32″W	Gainesville	
15	Devil's Millhopper	Devil's Millhopper	March 7, 2017 (#100000709)	Devil's Millhopper Geological State Park; 29°42′25″N 82°23′42″W	Gainesville vicinity	
16	Dixie Hotel, Hotel Kelley	Dixie Hotel, Hotel Kelley	August 16, 1982 (#82002369)	408 West University Avenue; 29°39′07″N 82°19′44″W	Gainesville	
17	Dudley Farm	Dudley Farm	October 4, 2002 (#02001081)	18730 West Newberry Road; 29°39′15″N 82°32′37″W	Newberry	Designated a National Historic Landmark in 2021.
18	Engineering Industries Building	Engineering Industries Building	June 24, 2008 (#08000547)	Stadium Road and Gale Lemerand Drive (North-South Drive); 29°38′54″N 82°20′53″W	Gainesville	part of the University of Florida Campus MPS
19	Epworth Hall	Epworth Hall	July 25, 1973 (#73000562)	419 Northeast 1st Street; 29°39′18″N 82°20′36″W	Gainesville	
20	Evins-Wood House		October 2, 2026 (#100013464)	8414 Southeast 182nd Avenue; 29°29′20″N 82°13′44″W	Evinston	
21	Evinston Community Store and Post Office	Evinston Community Store and Post Office	May 5, 1989 (#89000321)	County Road 225, north of the Alachua/Marion county border 29°29′06″N 82°13′34″W	Evinston	
22	Flint Hall	Flint Hall	June 27, 1979 (#79000654)	West University Avenue; 29°39′06″N 82°20′37″W	Gainesville	
23	Floyd Hall	Floyd Hall	June 27, 1979 (#79000655)	University of Florida campus 29°38′59″N 82°20′38″W	Gainesville	
24	High Springs Historic District	High Springs Historic District	October 31, 1991 (#91001540)	Roughly bounded by Northwest 14th Street, Northwest 6th Avenue, Southeast 7th Street, and Southwest 5th Avenue; 29°49′32″N 82°35′48″W	High Springs	
25	Hotel Thomas	Hotel Thomas	July 16, 1973 (#73000563)	Bounded by Northeast 2nd and 5th Streets and Northeast 6th and 7th Avenues; 29°39′45″N 82°19′47″W	Gainesville	
26	Hawthorne Cemetery	Hawthorne Cemetery	May 4, 2015 (#14000172)	FL 20; 29°35′48″N 82°04′21″W	Hawthorne	
27	The Hub	The Hub	June 24, 2008 (#08000551)	Stadium Road between Buckman Drive and Fletcher Drive; 29°38′55″N 82°20′44″W	Gainesville	Part of the University of Florida Campus MPS
28	Island Grove Masonic Lodge No. 125	Island Grove Masonic Lodge No. 125	December 7, 2010 (#10000984)	20114 Southeast 219 Avenue; 29°27′12″N 82°06′24″W	Island Grove	NRHP No. 10000984
29	A. Quinn Jones House	A. Quinn Jones House	January 27, 2010 (#09001278)	1013 NW. 7th Avenue; 29°39′26″N 82°20′08″W	Gainesville	
30	Kanapaha	Kanapaha	May 2, 1986 (#86000915)	8500 State Road 24; 29°35′40″N 82°26′07″W	Gainesville	
31	Lake Pithlachocco Canoe Site	Lake Pithlachocco Canoe Site	March 27, 2001 (#01000303)	Address Restricted	Gainesville	
32	Lakeshore Towers		November 20, 2024 (#100011031)	2306 Southwest 13th Street; 29°37′47″N 82°20′29″W	Gainesville	
33	Liberty Hill Schoolhouse	Liberty Hill Schoolhouse	August 28, 2003 (#03000825)	7600 Northwest 23rd Avenue; 29°40′33″N 82°25′24″W	Gainesville	
34	Library East	Library East	June 27, 1979 (#79000656)	Murphree Way; 29°39′02″N 82°20′31″W	Gainesville	
35	Masonic Temple	Masonic Temple	May 29, 1998 (#98000589)	215 North Main Street; 29°39′12″N 82°19′30″W	Gainesville	
36	Matheson House	Matheson House	June 4, 1973 (#73000564)	528 Southeast 1st Avenue; 29°39′03″N 82°19′13″W	Gainesville	
37	Mary Phifer McKenzie House	Mary Phifer McKenzie House	April 26, 1982 (#82002370)	617 East University Avenue; 29°39′05″N 82°19′10″W	Gainesville	
38	Melrose Historic District	Melrose Historic District	January 12, 1990 (#89002305)	Roughly bounded by Seminole Ridge Road, Grove Street, South Street, Quail Street, and Melrose Bay; 29°42′45″N 82°03′03″W	Melrose	
39	Micanopy Historic District	Micanopy Historic District	January 28, 1983 (#83003512)	Roughly Cholokka Boulevard from U.S. Route 441 to Ocala Street then Smith Street west to Okehumkee Street; 29°30′21″N 82°16′58″W	Micanopy	
40	Mission San Francisco de Potano		April 30, 2009 (#09000251)	Off County Road 236 north of High Springs; 29°53′01″N 82°33′59″W	Gainesville	It is an archaeological site (8AL272, Fox Pond) in Ichetucknee Springs State Park
41	Neilson House	Neilson House	June 4, 1973 (#73000566)	State Road 325; 29°38′58″N 82°11′06″W	Windsor	
42	Newberry Historic District	Newberry Historic District	December 24, 1987 (#87002150)	Roughly bounded by Northwest Second Avenue, Northwest Second Street, Lucile Street, and Northwest Ninth Street; 29°38′45″N 82°36′49″W	Newberry	
43	Newell Hall	Newell Hall	June 27, 1979 (#79000657)	Stadium Road; 29°38′56″N 82°20′43″W	Gainesville	
44	Newnansville Town Site	Newnansville Town Site	December 4, 1974 (#74000608)	State Road 235, northeast of Alachua; 29°48′31″N 82°28′36″W	Alachua	
45	Northeast Gainesville Residential District	Northeast Gainesville Residential District	February 12, 1980 (#80000942)	Roughly bounded by 1st and 9th Streets and 10th and East University Avenues; 29°39′23″N 82°19′11″W	Gainesville	
46	Old Gainesville Depot	Old Gainesville Depot	November 22, 1996 (#96001369)	203 Southeast Depot Avenue; 29°38′41″N 82°19′24″W	Gainesville	
47	Old Mount Carmel Baptist Church	Old Mount Carmel Baptist Church	April 1, 2021 (#100006345)	429 NW 4th St. 29°39′20″N 82°19′43″W	Gainesville	
48	Old P.K. Yonge Laboratory School	Old P.K. Yonge Laboratory School	January 26, 1990 (#89002302)	Southwest 13th Street on the University of Florida campus 29°38′48″N 82°20′17″W	Gainesville	
49	Peabody Hall	Peabody Hall	June 27, 1979 (#79000658)	University of Florida campus 29°38′59″N 82°20′31″W	Gainesville	
50	Pleasant Street Historic District	Pleasant Street Historic District	April 20, 1989 (#89000323)	Roughly bounded by Northwest 8th Avenue, Northwest 1st Street, Northwest 2nd Avenue, and Northwest 6th Street; 29°39′21″N 82°19′43″W	Gainesville	
51	Carlos and Marjorie Proctor Log House and Cottage	Carlos and Marjorie Proctor Log House and Cottage	June 25, 2018 (#100002620)	2250 NW 8th Ave. 29°39′34″N 82°21′19″W	Gainesville	
52	Marjorie Kinnan Rawlings House and Farm Yard	Marjorie Kinnan Rawlings House and Farm Yard	September 29, 1970 (#70000176)	18700 South County Road 325; 29°28′53″N 82°09′37″W	Cross Creek	
53	Rochelle School	Rochelle School	April 2, 1973 (#73000565)	Off State Road 234; 29°35′34″N 82°13′25″W	Rochelle	
54	Rolfs Hall	Rolfs Hall	September 11, 1986 (#86002411)	Buckman Drive on the University of Florida campus 29°38′57″N 82°20′30″W	Gainesville	
55	Shady Grove Primitive Baptist Church	Shady Grove Primitive Baptist Church	October 5, 2005 (#05001115)	804 Southwest Fifth Street; 29°38′47″N 82°19′47″W	Gainesville	
56	Southeast Gainesville Residential District	Southeast Gainesville Residential District	January 14, 1988 (#87002435)	Roughly bounded by East University Avenue, Southeast Ninth Street, Southeast Fifth Avenue, and Sweetwater Branch; 29°38′57″N 82°19′04″W	Gainesville	
57	Star Garage	Star Garage	December 17, 1985 (#85003197)	119 Southeast First Avenue; 29°39′02″N 82°19′25″W	Gainesville	
58	Stephens House	Stephens House	July 31, 2017 (#100001386)	19802 Old Bellamy Rd. 29°50′12″N 82°29′44″W	Alachua	
59	Thomas Hall	Thomas Hall	October 1, 1974 (#74000610)	Fletcher Drive on the University of Florida campus 29°39′03″N 82°20′46″W	Gainesville	
60	U.S. Post Office	U.S. Post Office	July 10, 1979 (#79000659)	25 Southeast 2nd Place; 29°38′57″N 82°19′27″W	Gainesville	
61	Federal Building, United States Post Office, and Court House	Federal Building, United States Post Office, and Court House	September 8, 2022 (#100008118)	401 SE 1st Ave. 29°39′03″N 82°19′17″W	Gainesville	
62	University Evangelical Lutheran Church Complex	University Evangelical Lutheran Church Complex	April 2, 2021 (#100006346)	1826 West University Ave. 29°39′08″N 82°20′51″W	Gainesville	
63	University of Florida Campus Historic District	University of Florida Campus Historic District	April 20, 1989 (#89000322)	Bounded by West University Avenue, Southwest 13th Street, Stadium Road, and North-South Drive; 29°39′01″N 82°20′38″W	Gainesville	
64	Waldo Historic District	Waldo Historic District	February 2, 2001 (#01000034)	Roughly bounded by Northwest 1st Avenue, Main Street, Southwest 5th Boulevard, and Southwest 4th Street; 29°47′28″N 82°10′14″W	Waldo	
65	Weil-Cassisi House	Weil-Cassisi House	November 9, 2015 (#15000587)	3105 SW. 5th Ct. 29°37′26″N 82°19′49″W	Gainesville	
66	Winecoff House	Winecoff House	February 14, 2002 (#02000001)	102 Northeast Seminary Avenue; 29°30′16″N 82°16′54″W	Micanopy	
67	Women's Gymnasium	Women's Gymnasium	June 27, 1979 (#79000660)	East-West Road; 29°39′01″N 82°20′49″W	Gainesville	
68	Yulee-Mallory-Reid Dormitory Complex	Yulee-Mallory-Reid Dormitory Complex	June 24, 2008 (#08000552)	13th Street and Inner Road, SW. 29°38′50″N 82°20′28″W	Gainesville	Part of the University of Florida Campus MPS

== Former listing ==
	Name on the Register	Image	Date listed	Date removed	Location	City or town	Description
1	Old WRUF Radio Station	Old WRUF Radio Station	September 21, 1989 (#89001479)	April 18, 2025	Museum Road and Newell Drive; 29°39′12″N 82°20′36″W	Gainesville	Demolished 2021

== See also ==
- List of National Historic Landmarks in Florida
- National Register of Historic Places listings in Florida
