= Mary Phifer McKenzie House =

Historic house in Florida, United States

- U.S. National Register of Historic Places
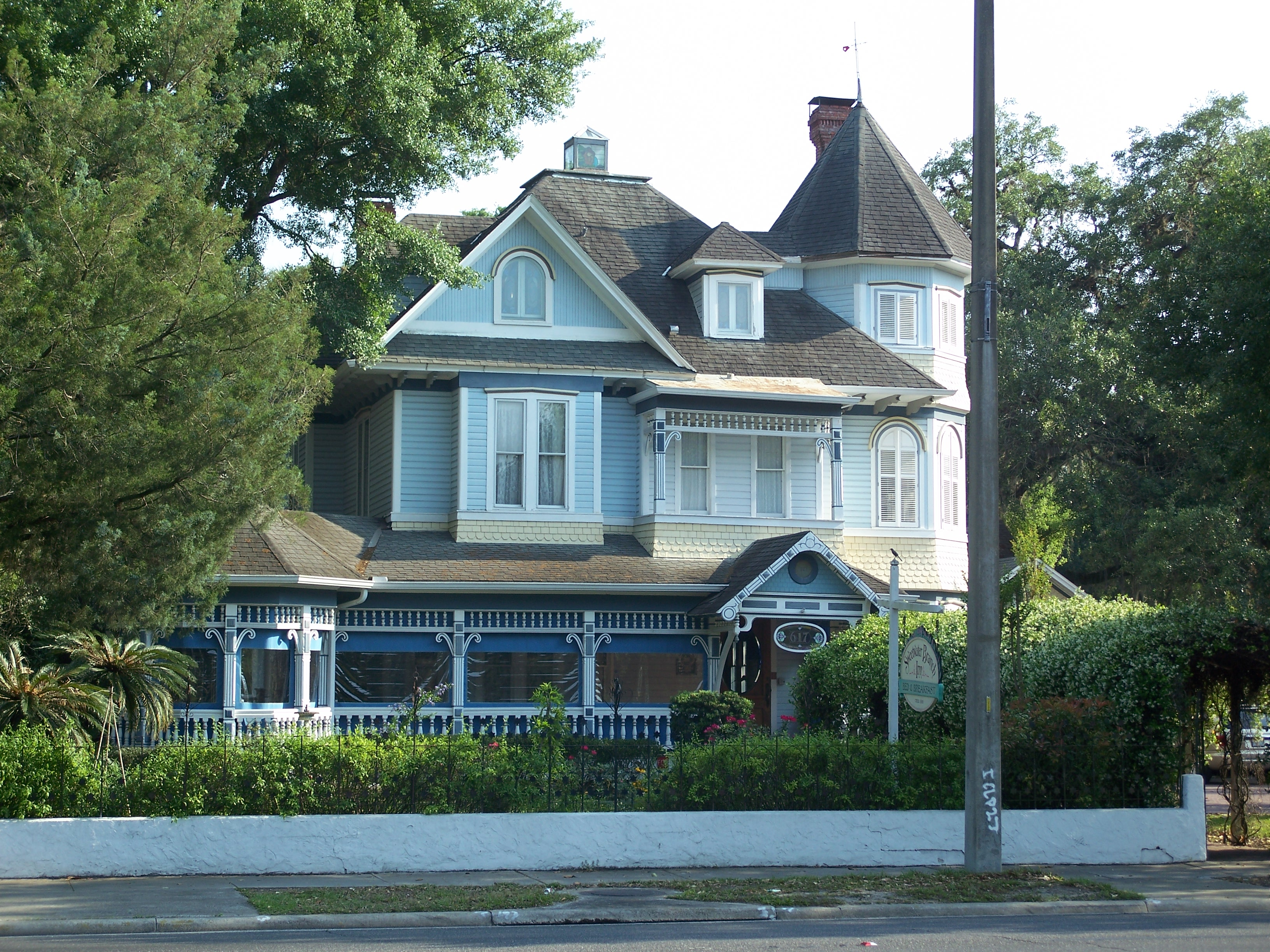

- Location within Florida Location within the United States
- Location: 617 East University Avenue; Gainesville, Alachua County, Florida, USA
- Coordinates: 29°39′5″N 82°19′10″W
- Built: c.1895
- Architectural style: Queen Anne
- NRHP reference No.: 82002370
- Added to NRHP: April 26, 1982

The Mary Phifer McKenzie House, now the Sweetwater Branch Inn Bed and Breakfast, is an historic house located at 617 East University Avenue in Gainesville, Florida. It was added to the National Register of Historic Places in 1982.

The house was constructed in about 1895 and is an irregularly massed two-and-a-half-story Queen Anne-style home.

It is known as one of the most elaborate Victorian buildings ever constructed in Gainesville. It has intricate Eastlake architecture details and a fanciful restored massing. It has three-story octagonal turrets on the west face, a wrap-around veranda, and octagonal gazebo.

The Sweetwater Inn includes two restored Victorian-era mansions (the McKenzie House and the Cushman-Colson House.

== History ==
Perry Colson purchased the home in 1903 and sold it to William Turner Pound, the first husband of Mary Phifer. In the 1920s Mary Phifer married Reid Hill McKenzie. She lived in the McKenzie house until she was 83 years old.

This property is now the location of five guest rooms.

The Holbrook family, the current owners and innkeepers, purchased the property, that had been neglected, in 1978. Giovanna and Juan Holbrook began restoring it. Giovanna Holbrook and her daughter Cornelia later purchased and restored the Cushman-Colson House in 1992.

== Media coverage ==
The inn was featured on the PBS television series, Inn Country USA.

== See also ==
- National Register of Historic Places listings in Alachua County, Florida
