= Island Grove Masonic Lodge No. 125 =

- U.S. National Register of Historic Places
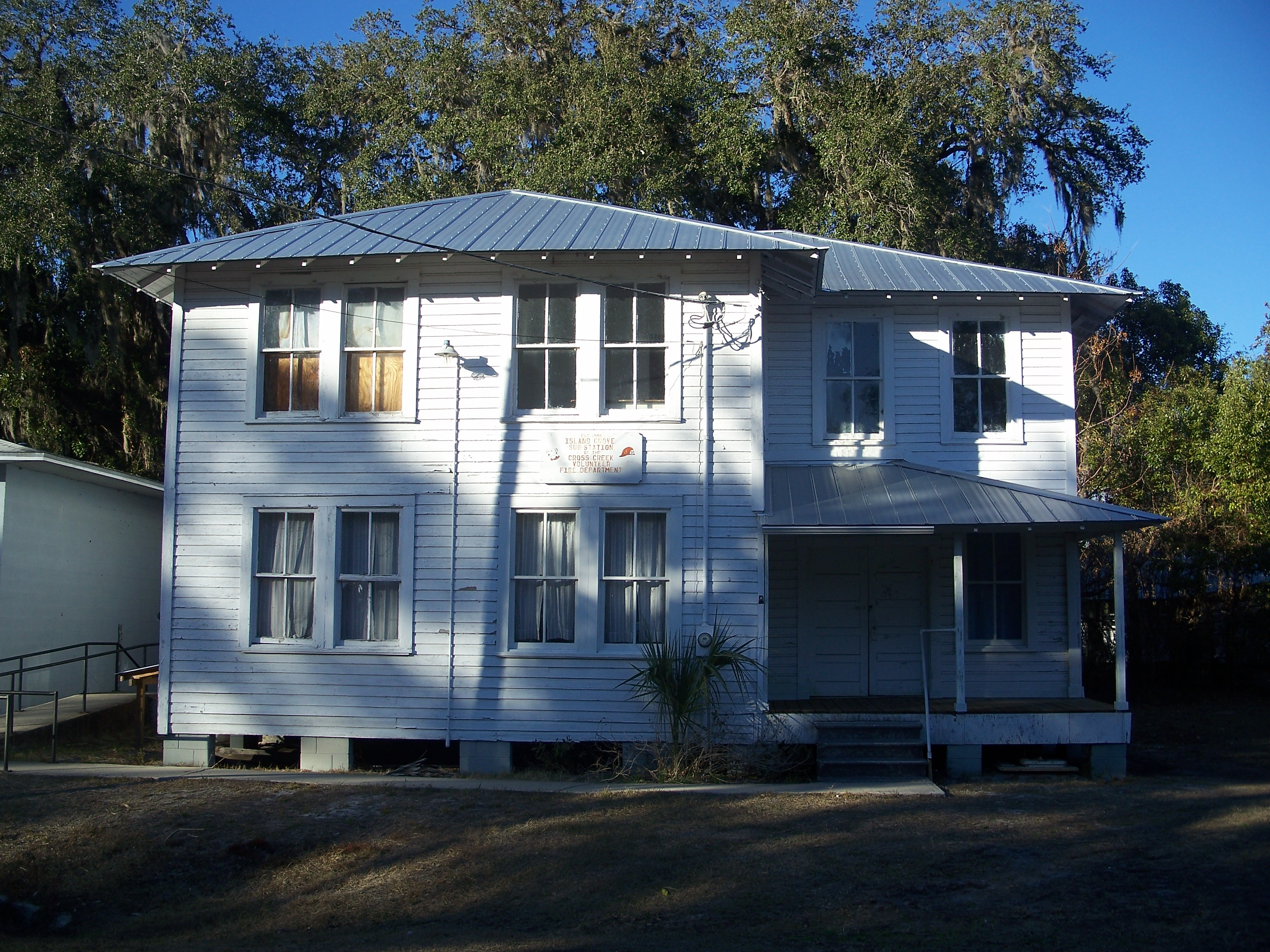

- Location within Florida Location within the United States
- Location: 20114 Southeast 219 Avenue., Island Grove, Florida
- Coordinates: 29.453333°N 82.106667°W
- Built: 1924
- NRHP reference No.: 10000984
- Added to NRHP: December 7, 2010

The Island Grove Masonic Lodge No. 125 is a historic building in Alachua County. It was added to the National Register of Historic Places on December 7, 2010. It is located at 20114 Southeast 219 Avenue.

== See also ==
- National Register of Historic Places listings in Alachua County, Florida
- National Register of Historic Places listings in Florida
