= Devil's Millhopper Geological State Park =

State park in Florida, United States

- IUCN category III (natural monument or feature)
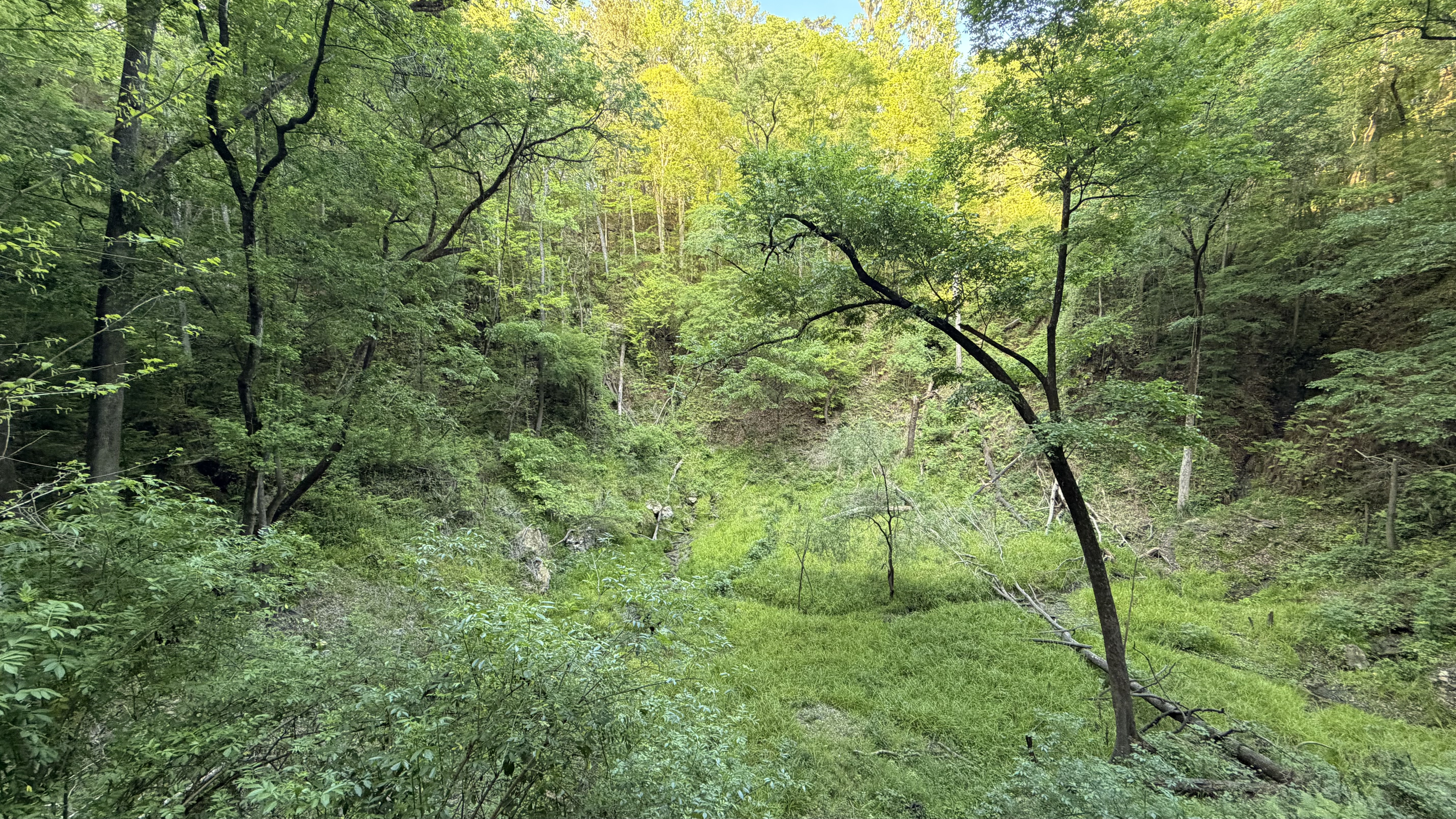
- View from the bottom observation deck

- Location within Florida Location within the United States
- Interactive map of Devil's Millhopper Geological State Park
- Location: Alachua County, Florida, USA
- Nearest city: Gainesville, Florida
- Coordinates: 29°42′25″N 82°23′42″W
- Area: 67 acres (27 ha)
- Established: 1974
- Governing body: Florida Department of Environmental Protection

U.S. National Natural Landmark
- Designated: December 1974

Devil's Millhopper Geological State Park is a Florida state park located in Gainesville off County Road 232, also known as NW 53rd Avenue and Millhopper Road, northwest of the University of Florida. The park is maintained by the Florida Park Service, a division of the Florida Department of Environmental Protection. The park is adjacent to San Felasco County Park and is near the San Felasco Hammock Preserve State Park.

== Geology ==
The most prominent feature of the park is the large sinkhole formed by the dissolution of limestone by acidic groundwater over long periods of time. More than 100 feet (30 m) of rock layers are exposed in the sinkhole, making it the largest of its kind in Florida.

The cutaway, limestone sides of the sinkhole provide an easily visible geological record of the area. Twelve springs, some more visible than others, feed the pond at the bottom of the sinkhole. In summer the base of the sinkhole is cooler than the surface, because of its depth and the shade of the canopy. Significant fossil deposits include shark teeth, marine shells, and the fossilized remains of extinct land animals.

== Ecology ==
Although the park covers only 67 acres (27 ha), it contains three distinct ecological environments, shaped by exposure to sun, fire, and water. In the sandhill environment, the sandy soil and regular fires result in pine trees being the predominant vegetation. The moist soils of the hammocks support broadleaf trees and more low vegetation, while the swamp areas support flora and fauna adapted to year-around wet conditions.

== History ==
The 120-foot (37 m) deep, 500-foot (150 m) wide sinkhole was named for its resemblance to the hopper of a mill, along with the bones found at the bottom, suggesting animals entered it on the way to meeting the devil. The area was owned for a time by the science department at the University of Florida and used as a research site for students. The site has been used for geological and ecological study. However, the area was often used by students as a place to socialize and have parties, which led to problems with litter and erosion from foot traffic.

The site was purchased by the state in 1974, and a set of 236 wooden steps, along with boardwalks and an observation deck at the bottom were completed in 1976 to allow access to the sink for visitors without further soil erosion. The boardwalk was damaged by Hurricane Irma in 2017 and closed to the public. The damaged boardwalk was replaced with a 132-step structure that ends higher in the sinkhole than the old one did. The path into the sinkhole reopened to the public in 2019.

The formation was designated a National Natural Landmark in 1974, and was listed on the National Register of Historic Places (in part for its surviving Civilian Conservation Corps infrastructure) in 2017.

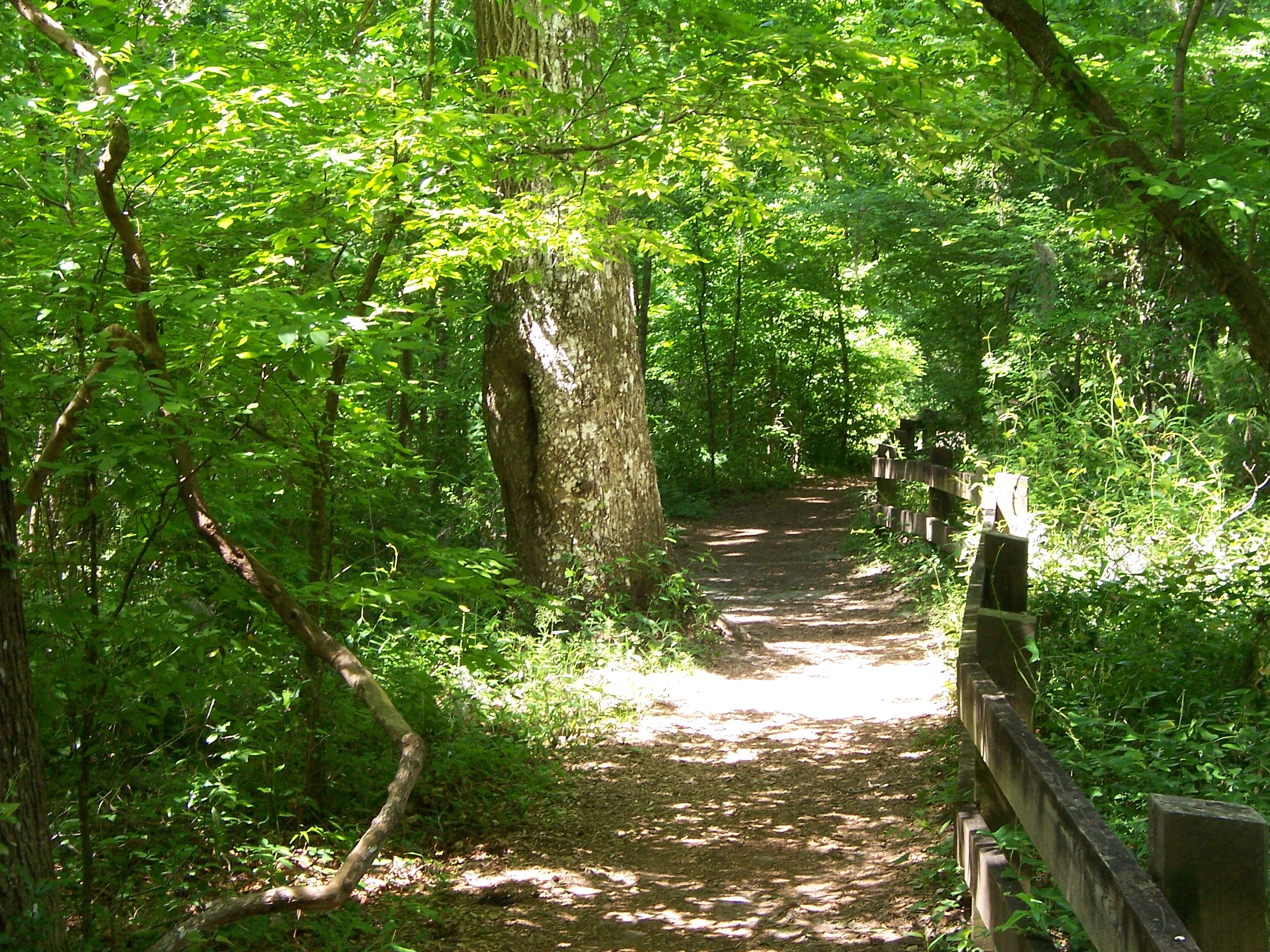
A nature trail in the park

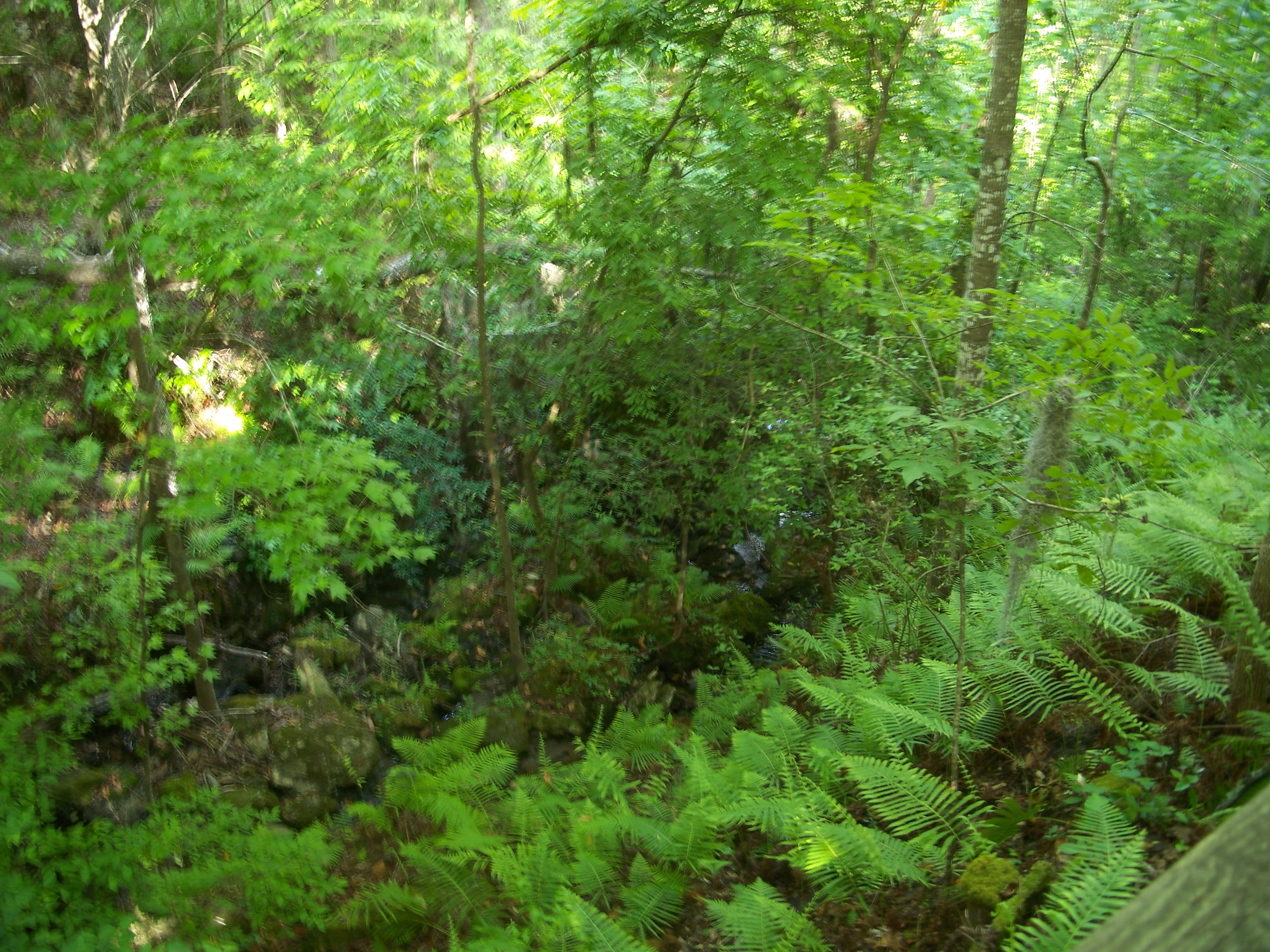
Vegetation

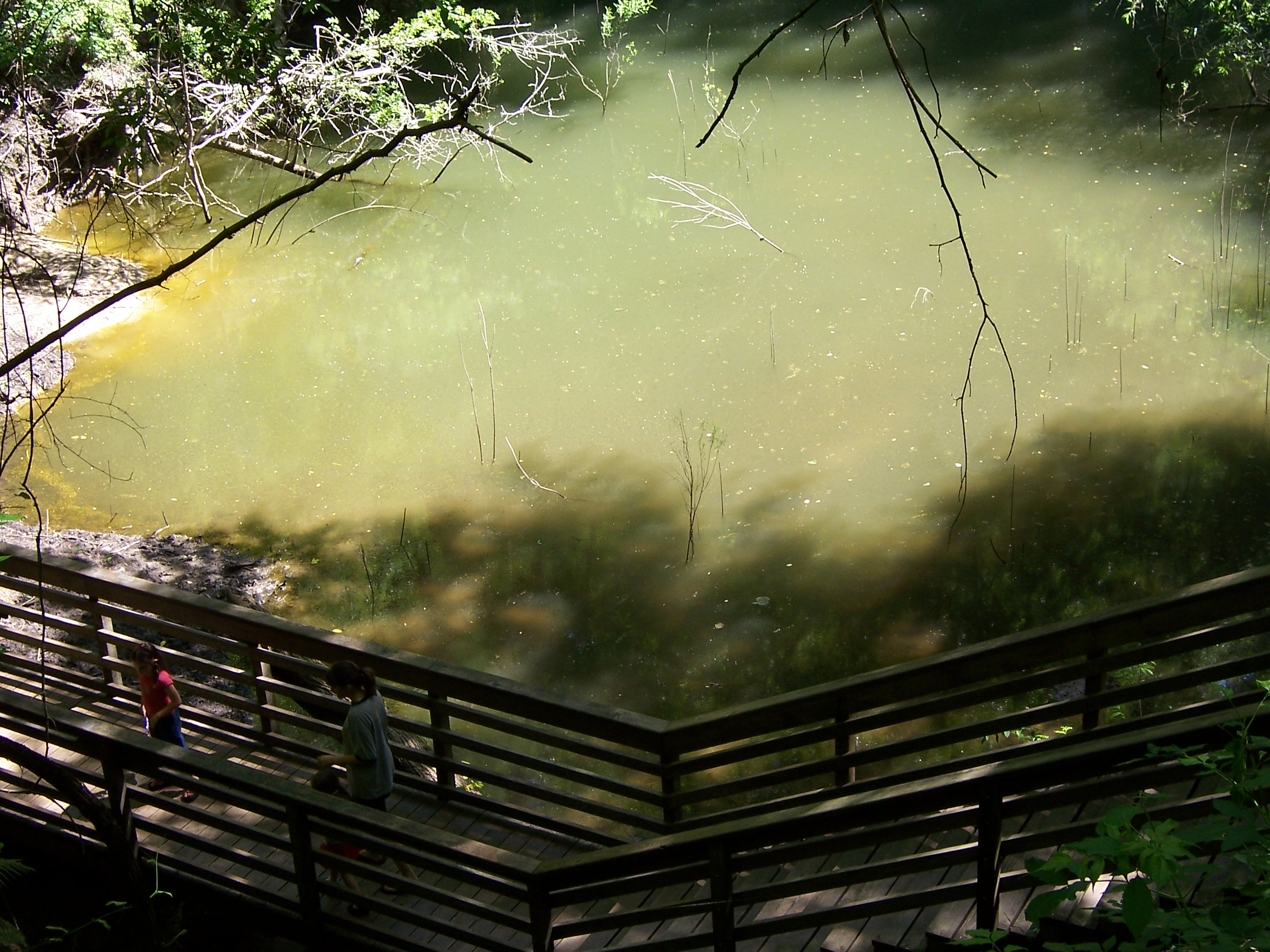
Boardwalk by the sinkhole

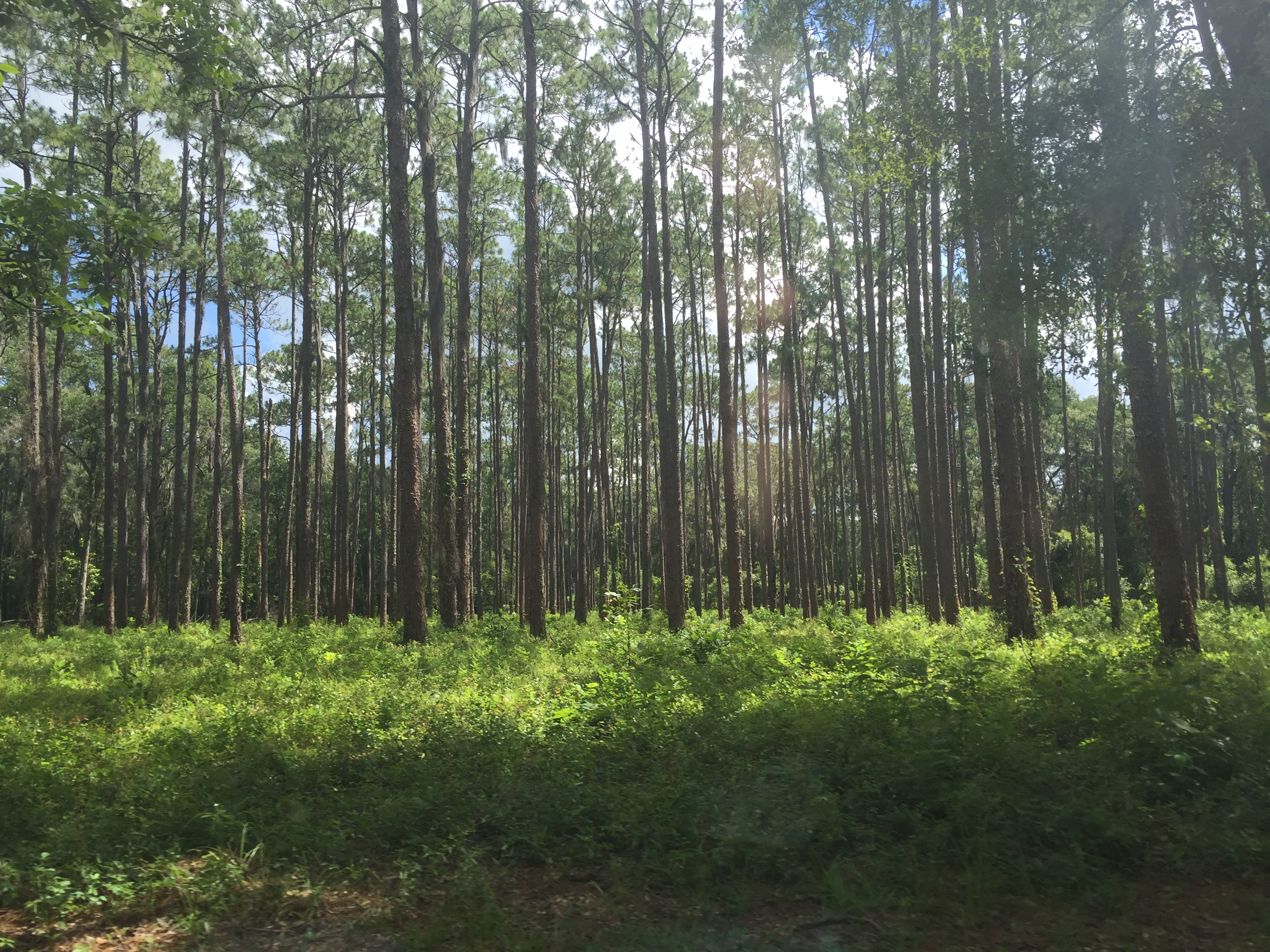
Florida Longleaf Pine Sandhill near the entrance

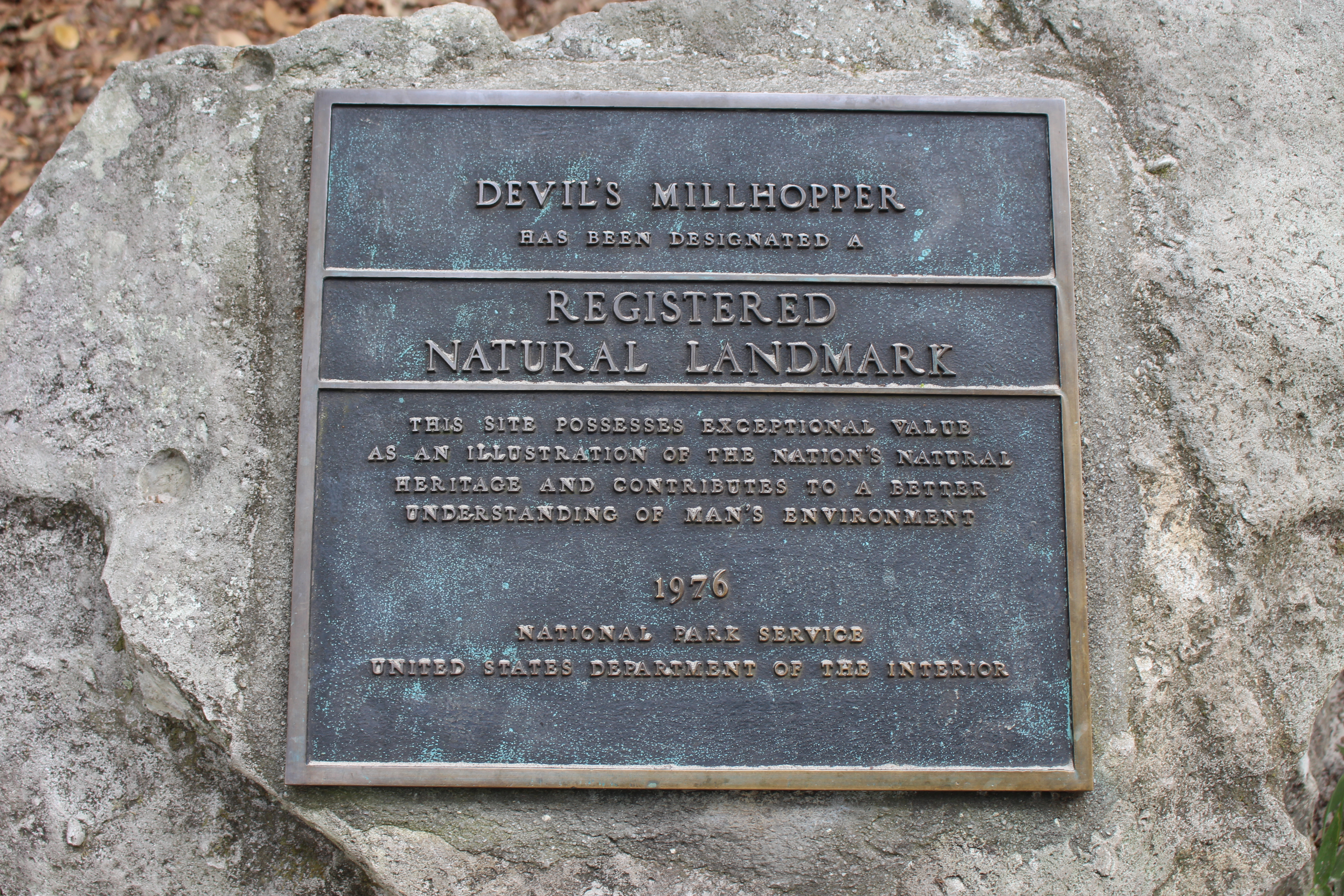
Registered Natural Landmark plaque

== See also ==
- Florida State Parks in Alachua County
- List of sinkholes of the United States
- National Register of Historic Places listings in Alachua County, Florida
