= Maj. James B. Bailey House =

Historic house in Florida, United States

- U.S. National Register of Historic Places
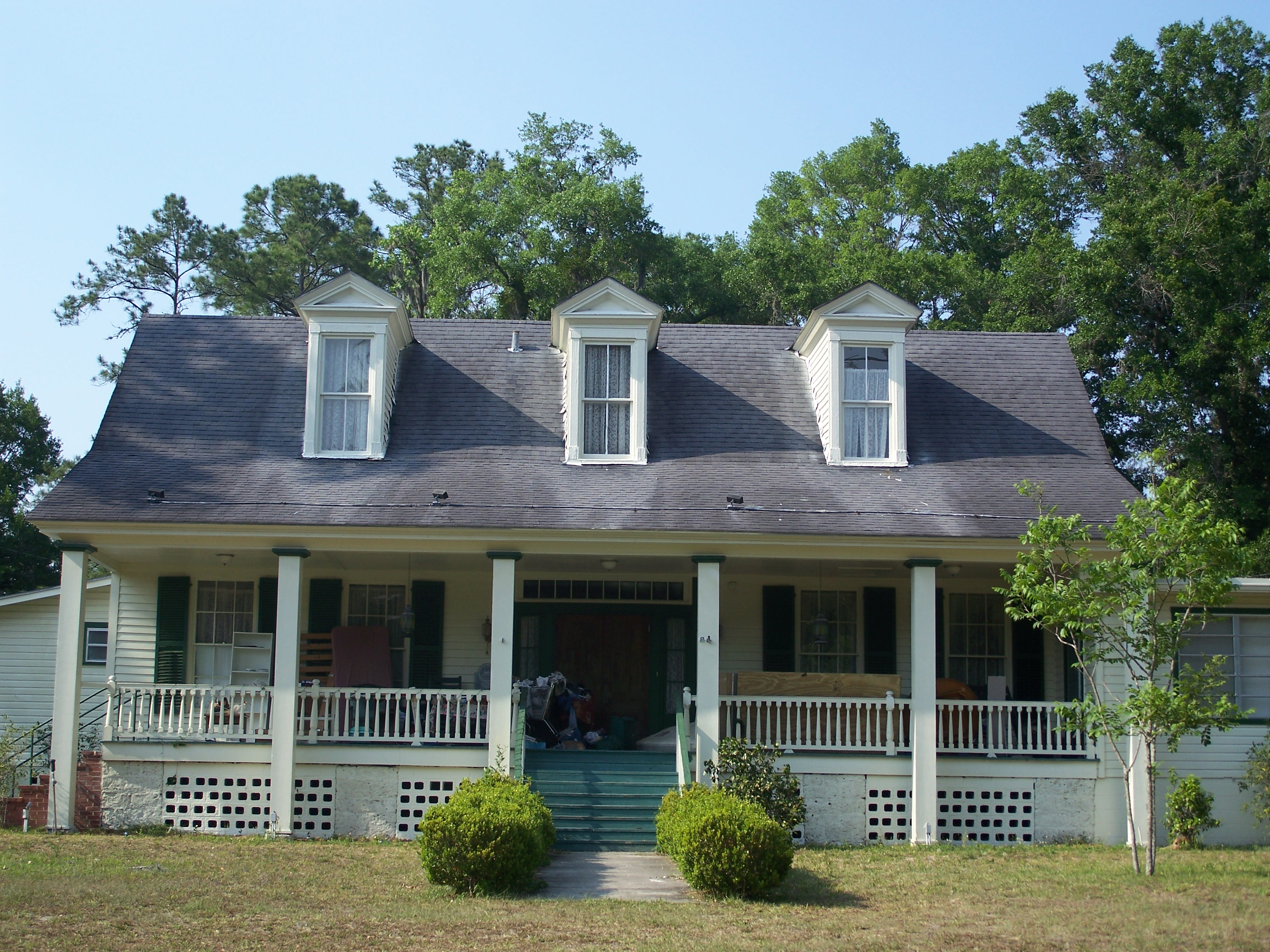

- Location within Florida Location within the United States
- Location: 1121 N.W. 6th St., Gainesville, Florida
- Coordinates: 29°39′47″N 82°19′52″W
- Area: less than one acre
- Built: 1854
- NRHP reference No.: 72000301
- Added to NRHP: December 5, 1972

The Maj. James B. Bailey House (also known as Rest Haven) is a historic home in Gainesville, Florida, United States. It is located at 1121 Northwest 6th Street. In 1972, it was added to the U.S. National Register of Historic Places.

It was built by Major James B. Bailey, early settler in the area, starting perhaps around 1848. Bailey, who owned a large area of land within Gainesville, seems likely to have been a force for the move of Alachua County's seat from Newnansville to Gainesville. The homestead house "remains today as an excellent example of early plantation architecture and the home of one of Gainesville's most important pioneers."

The house was documented by the Historic American Buildings Survey.

== See also ==
- National Register of Historic Places listings in Alachua County, Florida

== Gallery ==
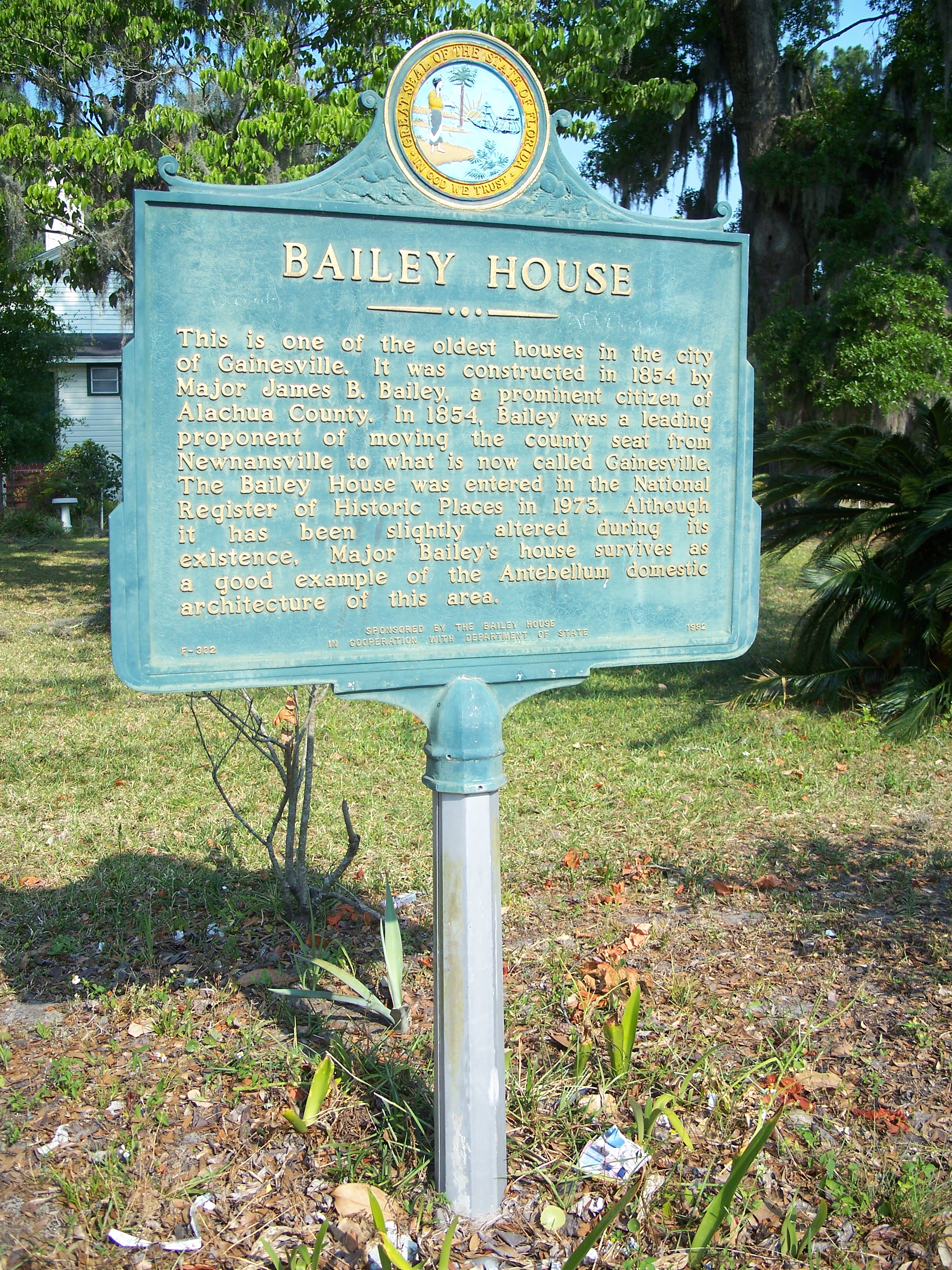
Historic marker

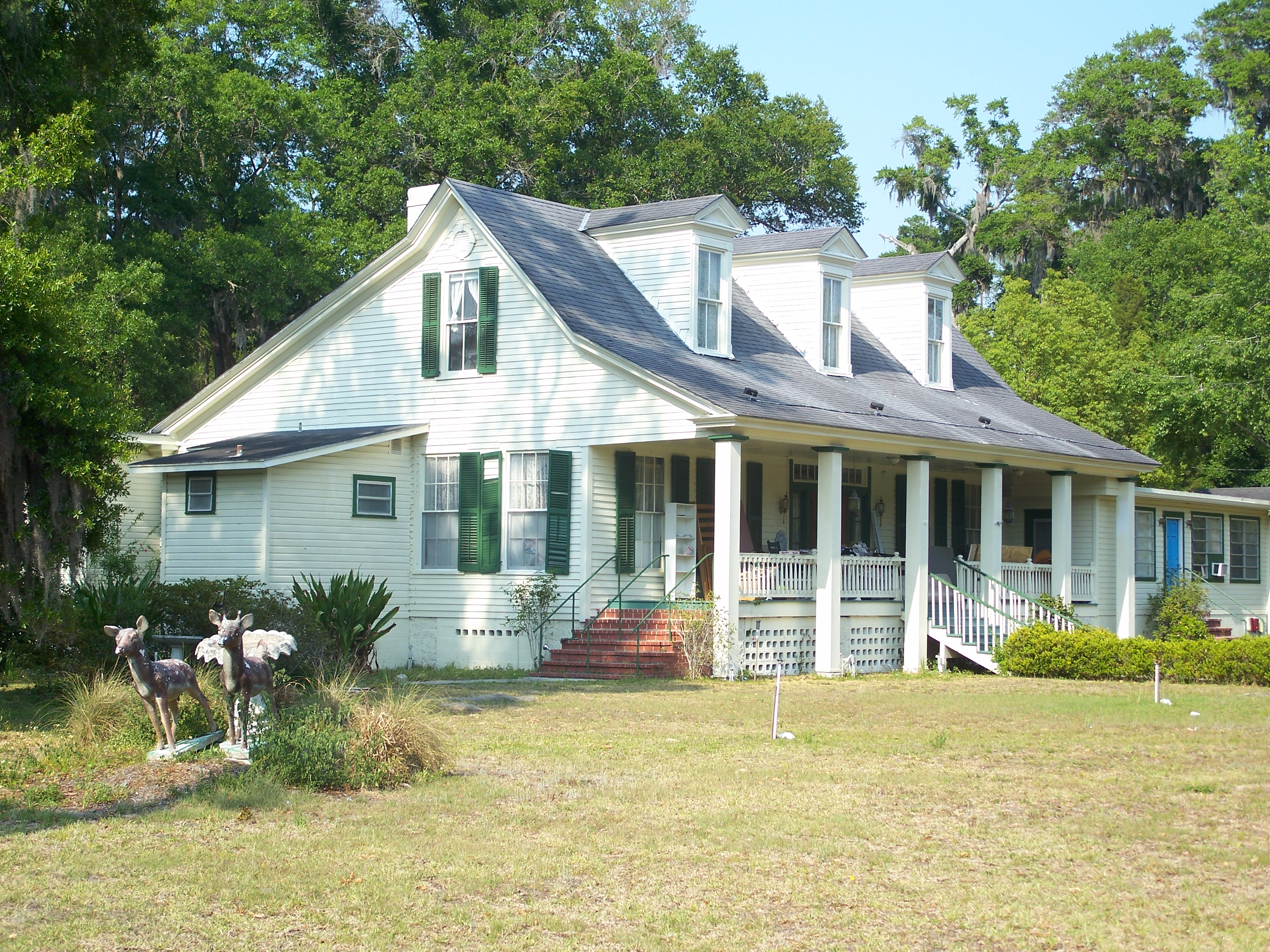

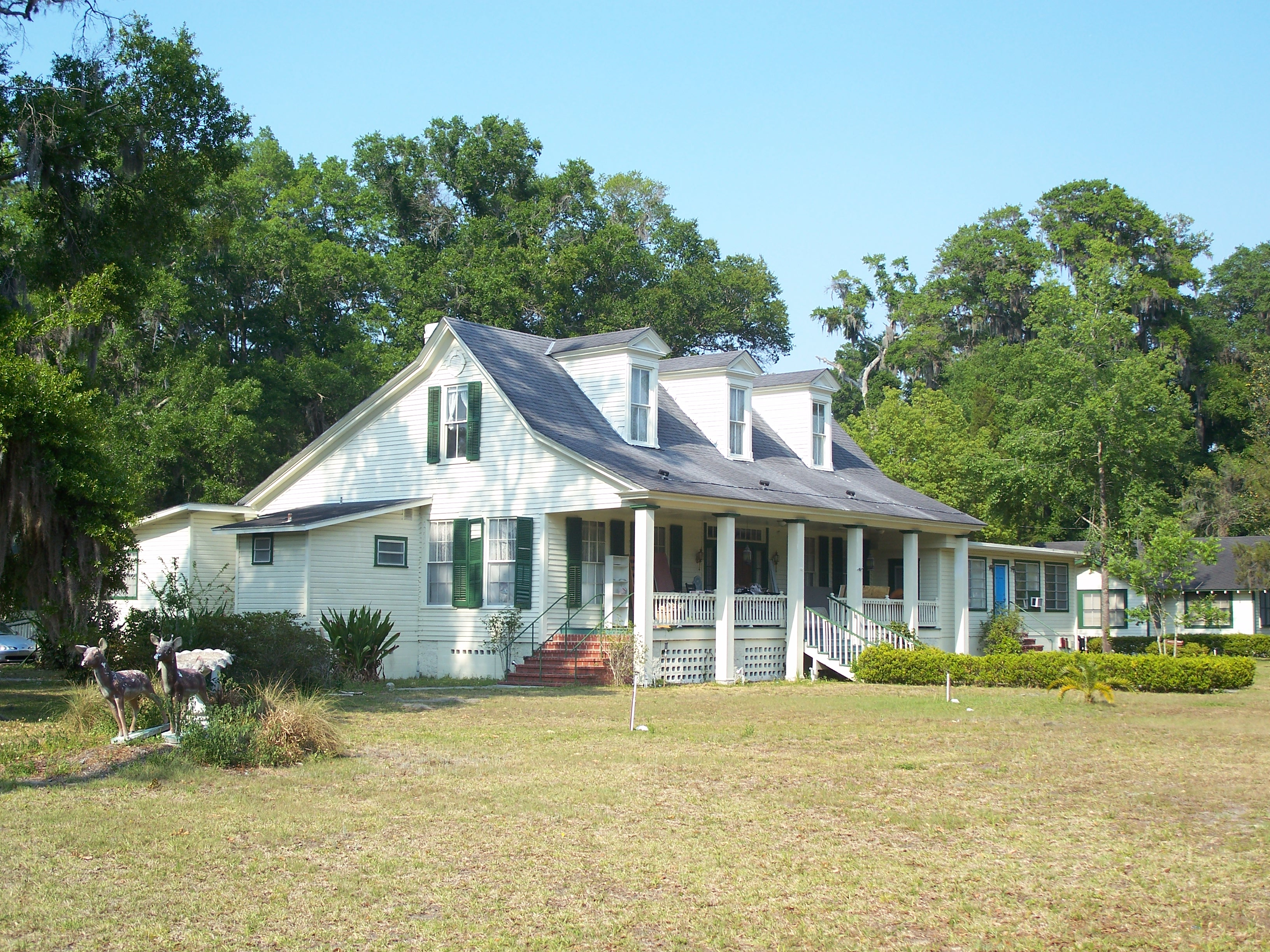
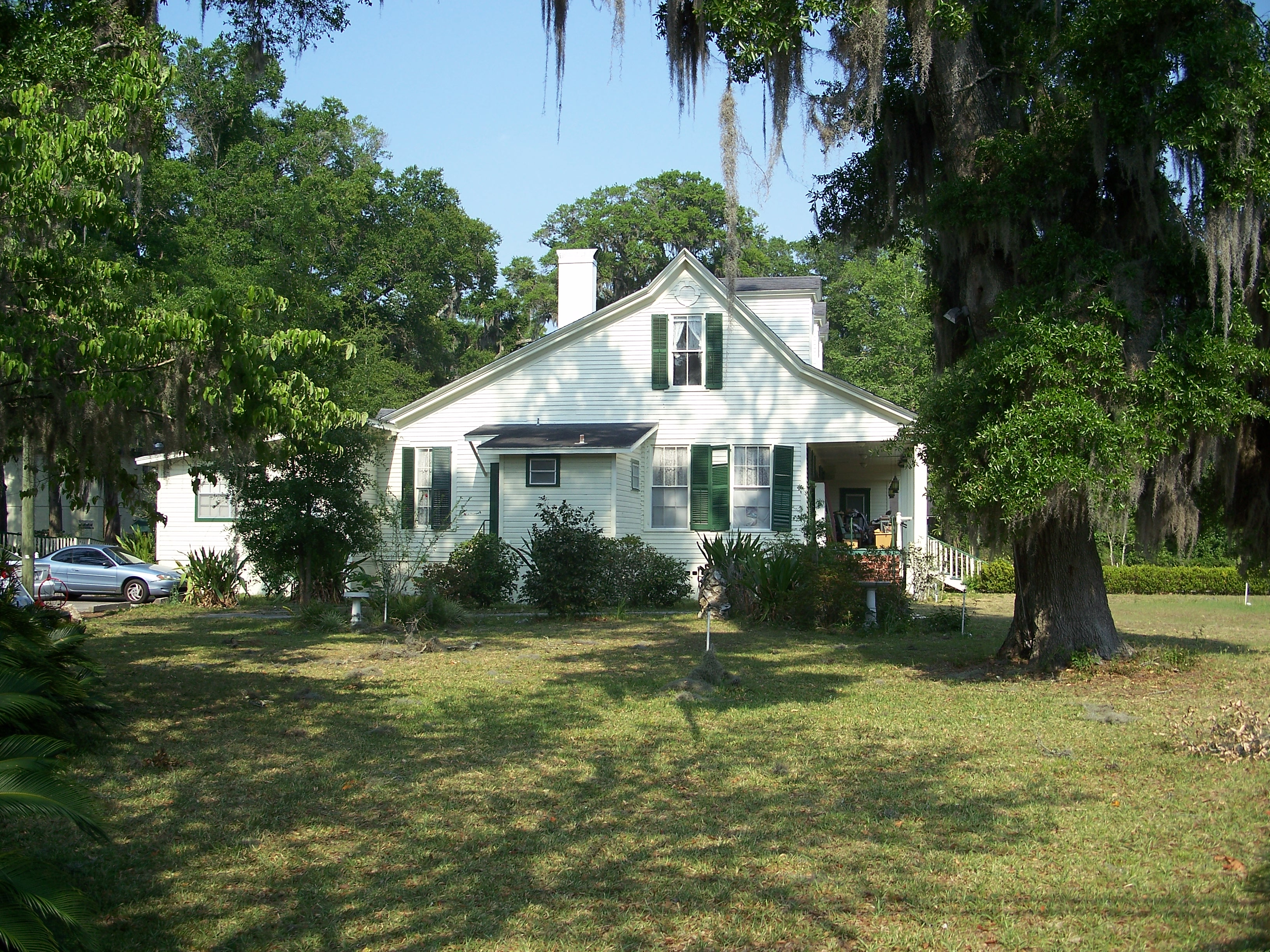
