= Dudley Farm Historic State Park =

- Dudley Farm
- U.S. National Register of Historic Places
- U.S. National Historic Landmark District
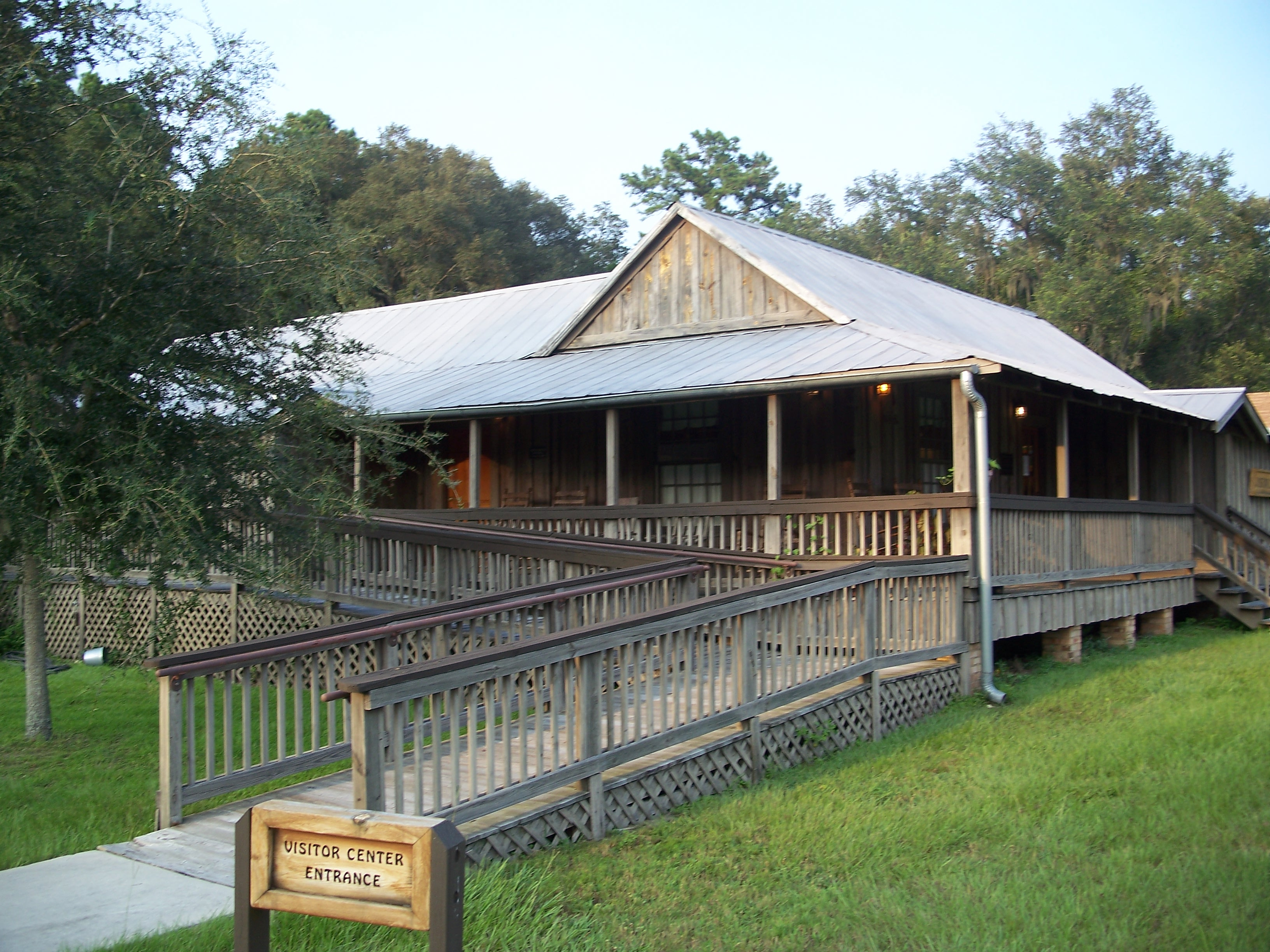
- Dudley Farm visitor center

- Location within Florida Location within the United States
- Interactive map of Dudley Farm
- Location: Alachua County, Florida, U.S.
- Nearest city: Newberry
- Coordinates: 29°39′15″N 82°32′37″W
- Area: 325 acres (1.32 km^{2}) (NRHP-listed area); 240 acres (97 ha) (NHL-designated area)
- Built: October 4, 2002
- NRHP reference No.: 02001081
- Designated NHLD: January 13, 2021

Dudley Farm Historic State Park (Florida), also known as Dudley Farm, is a U.S. historic district and museum park located in Newberry, Florida. It was added to the U.S. National Register of Historic Places on October 4, 2002, and was designated a National Historic Landmark on January 13, 2021. The address is 18730 West Newberry Road (Florida State Road 26). The farm is a particularly fine and well-preserved example of a mid-19th to mid-20th century farm.

== Description ==
The park encompasses approximately 325.6 acres (1.318 km^{2}), and contains 21 historic buildings and 13 structures, including the family farmhouse, an 1880s kitchen outbuilding, a general store and post office, and a cane syrup complex, all with original furnishings and equipment.

The southern portion of the park contains visitor parking, a visitor center, a gift shop, old barns and farming equipment, and a 0.3 mile nature walk through a Florida hammock. The visitor center was originally a house built in Newberry in 1918. The gift shop is an exact duplicate of a commissary once found on a 19th-century Florida turpentine plantation. This section of the park is on property which was not owned by the Dudley family.

The Dudley Farm historic site is accessible from a trail near the visitor center, leading to a segment of the original, non-paved, Gainesville-Newberry Road. The Farm maintains a registered Cracker cattle herd, and currently three Florida Cracker horses. There are also chickens and turkeys on the farm. These are specimens of poultry breeds common on late 19th and early 20th century U.S. farms. During part of its existence, the farm was a large, local egg producer. Several citrus trees, including two large, heritage Duncan grapefruit trees, represent the large commercial presence of citrus in north Florida during the 1840s-1890s. Other fruit crops grown on the farm during the Dudley period are also represented. These include figs, bananas, peaches, pecans and black walnuts.

The site is a working farm, showing agricultural development in Florida from the late 1850s through the mid-1940s. After that period, the farm was used solely for subsistence farming by a few third-generation family members into the 1990s. In 1996, Myrtle Dudley, the youngest and last living member of the third generation, died, leaving the site to the Florida Park Service.

== Events ==
Numerous events of many types, including first and third-person living histories, cane boils, corn grinding, paint-ins, children's days, weddings, and ranger-led tours for visitors and school classes take place throughout the year. The Friends of Dudley Farm, a state-recognized citizen support organization, cooperates closely with park personnel in organizing many of these events.

Due to the historic buildings, the Farm is also a popular spot for family and professional photography.

== See also ==
- Florida State Parks in Alachua County
- Newberry Six lynchings
- National Register of Historic Places listings in Alachua County, Florida
- List of National Historic Landmarks in Florida
