= Waldo Historic District =

Historic district in Florida, United States

- U.S. National Register of Historic Places
- U.S. Historic district
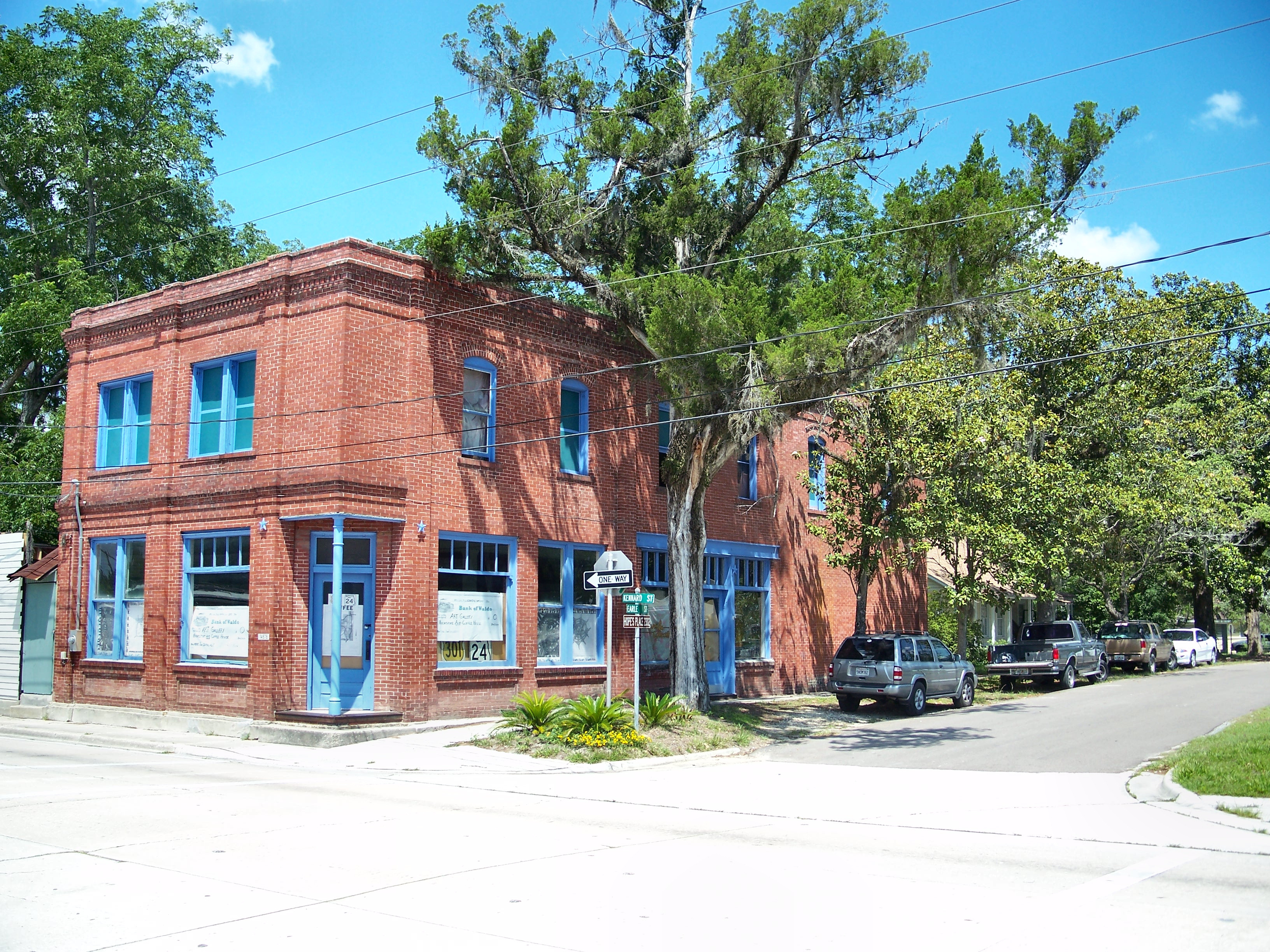
- Building in the district

- Location within Florida Location within the United States
- Location: Waldo, Florida
- Coordinates: 29°47′28″N 82°10′14″W
- Area: 560 acres (230 ha)
- NRHP reference No.: 01000034
- Added to NRHP: February 2, 2001

The Waldo Historic District is a U.S. historic district in Waldo, Florida. It is bounded by Northwest 1st Avenue, Main Street, Southwest 5th Boulevard, and Southwest 4th Street, encompasses approximately 560 acres (230 ha), and contains 60 historic buildings. On February 2, 2001, it was added to the U.S. National Register of Historic Places.
