= Evinston, Florida =

Unincorporated community in Florida, U.S.

- Unincorporated community
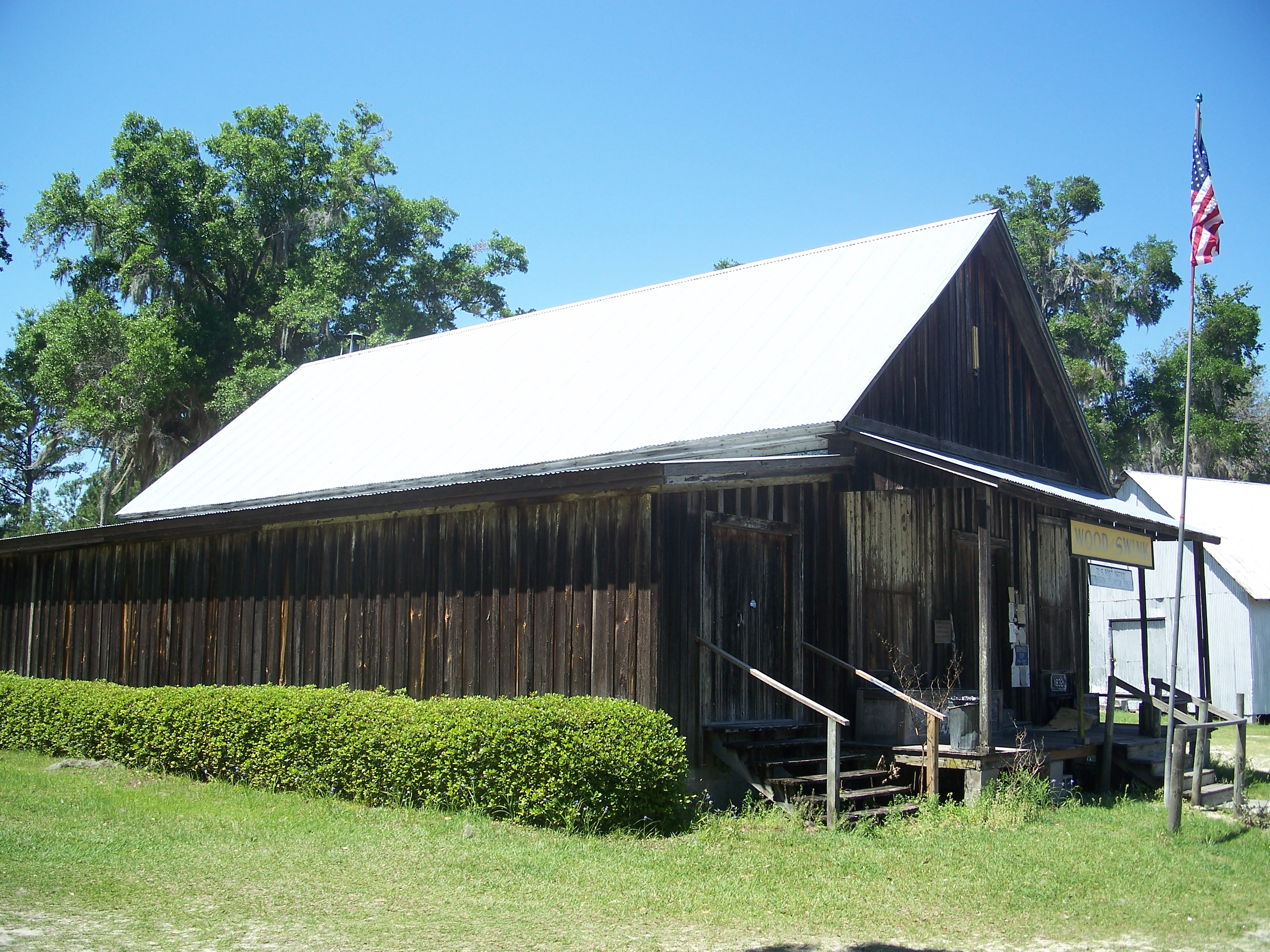
- Wood & Swink General Store, now the Evinston Community Store and Post Office
- Interactive map of Evinston, Florida
- Coordinates: 29°29′13″N 82°13′52″W
- Established: 1882
- Highest elevation: 27 m (89 ft)
- Lowest elevation: 26 m (85 ft)
- Time zone: UTC-5 (Eastern (EST))
  - Summer (DST): UTC-4 (EDT)
- Postal code: 32633

Evinston is an unincorporated community in Alachua and Marion counties, Florida, United States.

The Alachua County portion of Evinston is part of the Gainesville Metropolitan Statistical Area, while the Marion County portion is part of the Ocala Metropolitan Statistical Area.

== Geography ==
The community is on the west shore of Orange Lake.

U.S. Highway 441 connects the community to Gainesville, a few miles to the north. Evinston also is on County Road 225.

== History ==
Evinston was part of the Arredondo Grant of 1817. In 1884, the station at this location of the Florida Southern Railroad was named "Evinston", and a general store/post office was built.

The post office in Evinston was established in 1882.

Until the 1890s, orange growing was important, but a freeze in 1895 ended this pursuit.

The community contains a site on the U.S. National Register of Historic Places, the Evinston Community Store and Post Office.
