= Rochelle, Florida =

Unincorporated community in Florida, U.S.

Rochelle
- Unincorporated community
- Etymology: Maiden name of Governor Perry's wife
- Nicknames: Perry, Perry Junction, Gruelle
- Location in Florida
- Country: United States
- State: Florida
- County: Alachua County
- Founded: 1830s
- Founder: Built around the Plantation of Madison Starke Perry

Government
  - Type: Unincorporated

Population (1884)
  - Total: 150 (in 1,884)
- Time zone: UTC-5 (Eastern Time)
  - Summer (DST): UTC-4 (EDT)

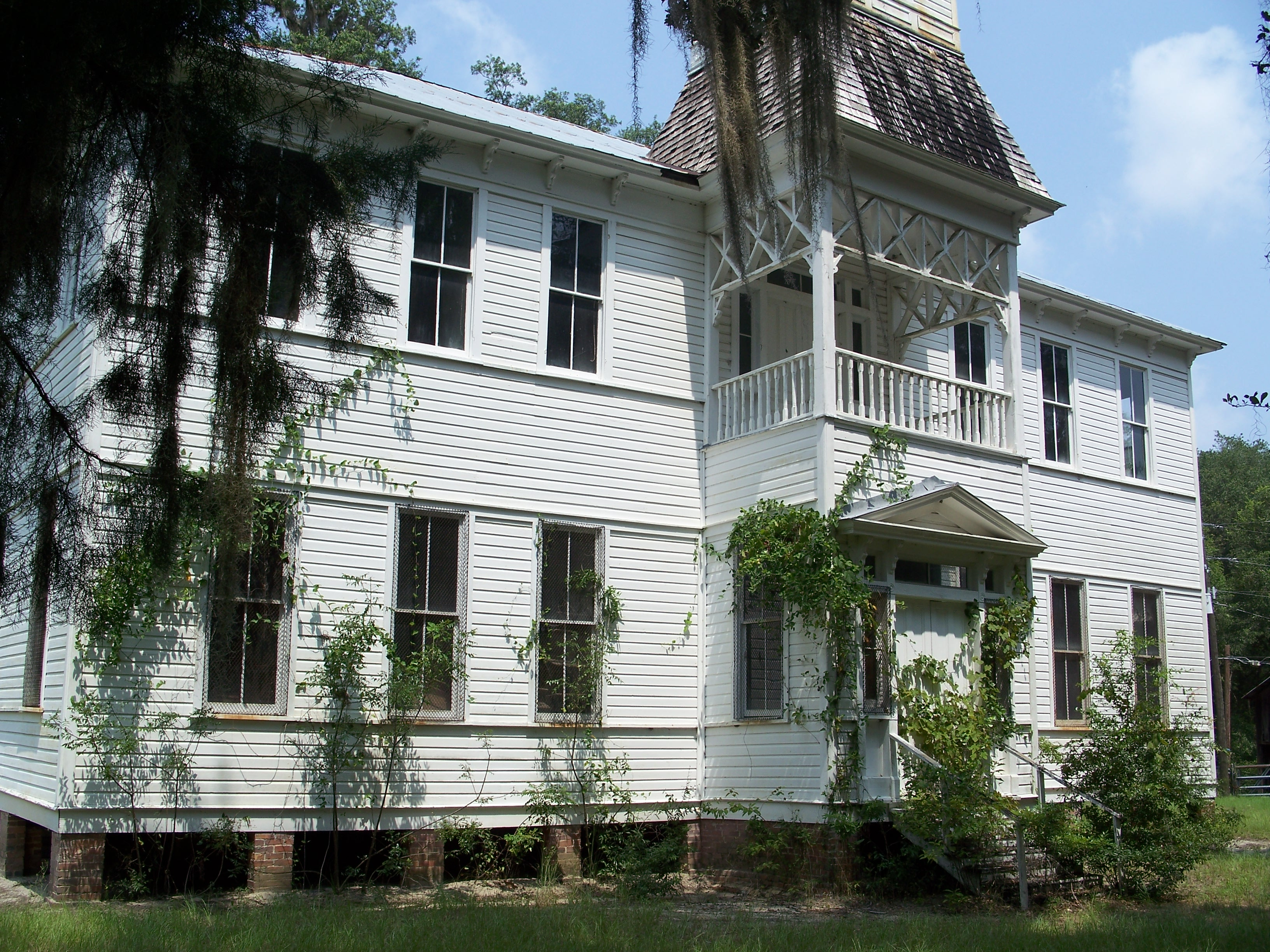
Old Martha Perry Institute

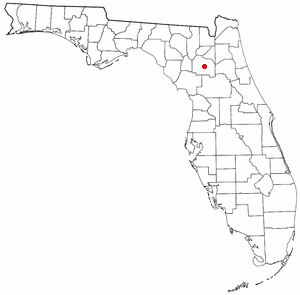
Location of Rochelle, Florida

Rochelle is an unincorporated community in Alachua County, Florida, United States. It was found in the 1830s on a former native settlement and mission site. and was built around the Plantation of Madison Starke Perry.

== History ==
Rochelle was at a junction on the Florida Southern Railway (later, the Plant System), with lines running to Gainesville, Ocala and Palatka. Originally known as Perry, or Perry Junction, the community was renamed Gruelle in 1881 after N. R. Gruelle, General Manager of the Florida Southern Railway (the station was still listed as Perry on the first timetable issued by the railway after it reached Gainesville in 1881).

In 1884, the community name was changed again, to Rochelle, the maiden name of Governor Perry's wife. The town was described as having a hotel, two or three stores, a sawmill, and an express-office in 1883, and a population of 150 in 1884.

Citrus growing became important in the area, and in 1885 the town had two sawmills, two churches, two schools (Rochelle School, also known as the Martha Perry Institute, for whites, and a school for blacks), and a couple dozen houses. The Great Freeze of 1894–1895 destroyed the citrus industry in the area, and the town declined afterwards. The Rochelle School closed in 1935.

Today, the only remnants of the former town are now the schoolhouse, the General Pacific plant, a radio tower, and some houses and barns. The 16-mile Hawthorne Trail has a trail head at the Witness Tree Junction near the Rochelle Vicinity Historic Marker, and follows the trail of the old railroad railbed.

== Geography ==
Rochelle is located at 29°35′47″N 82°13′04″W (29.59639, -82.21778).
