= Winecoff House =

Historic house in Florida, United States

- U.S. National Register of Historic Places
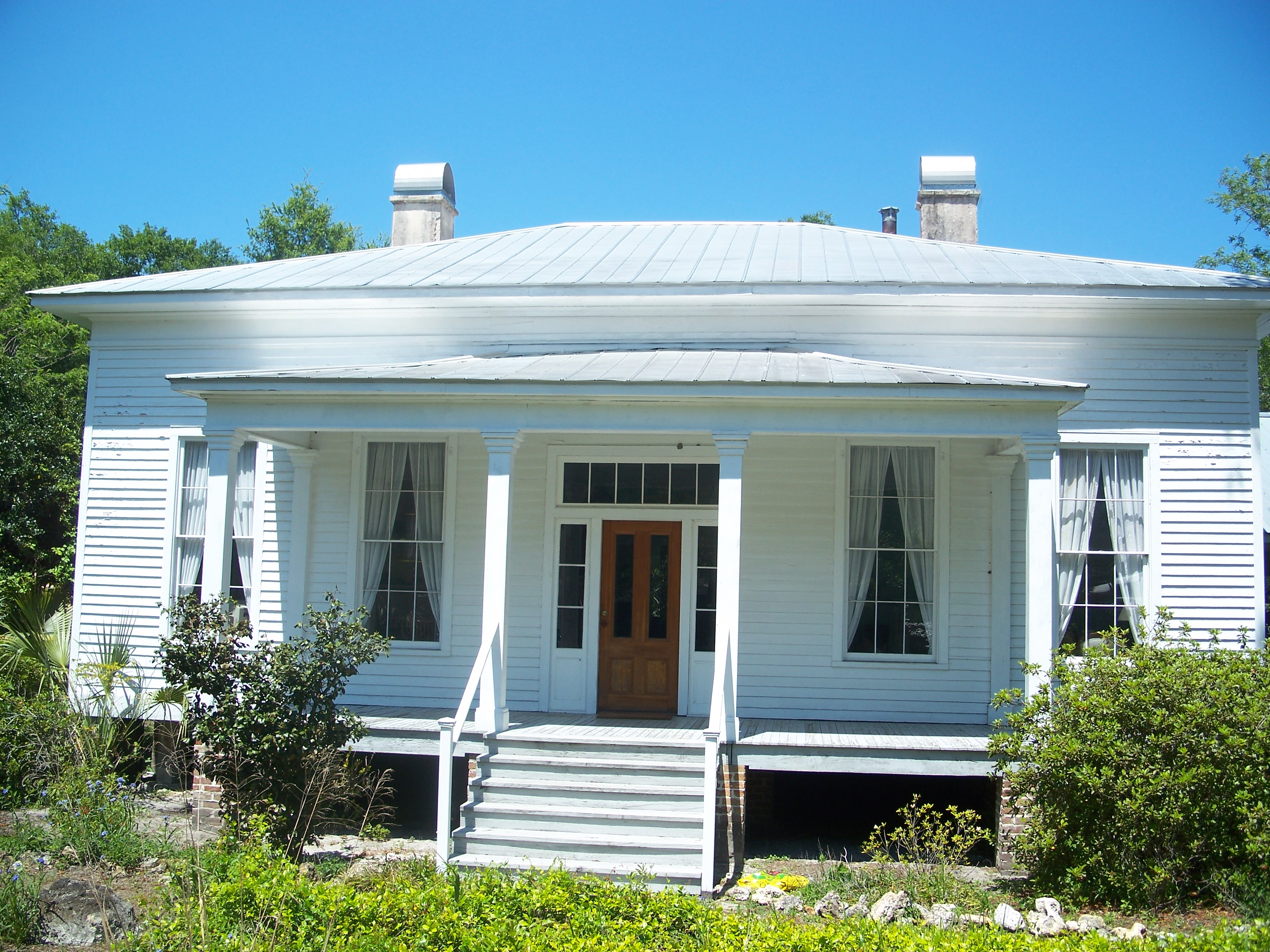

- Location within Florida Location within the United States
- Location: 102 NE Seminary Ave., Micanopy, Florida
- Coordinates: 29°30′16″N 82°16′54″W
- Area: less than one acre
- Built: c.1870
- Architectural style: Greek Revival
- NRHP reference No.: 02000001
- Added to NRHP: February 14, 2002

The Winecoff House (also known as the Winecoff Hotel, Central Hotel or Carter Hall) is a U.S. historic building in Micanopy, Florida, at 102 Northeast Seminary Avenue. It was added to the U.S. National Register of Historic Places in 2002.

It is a Greek Revival-style house build before 1871.
