= Neilson House =

Historic house in Florida, United States

- U.S. National Register of Historic Places
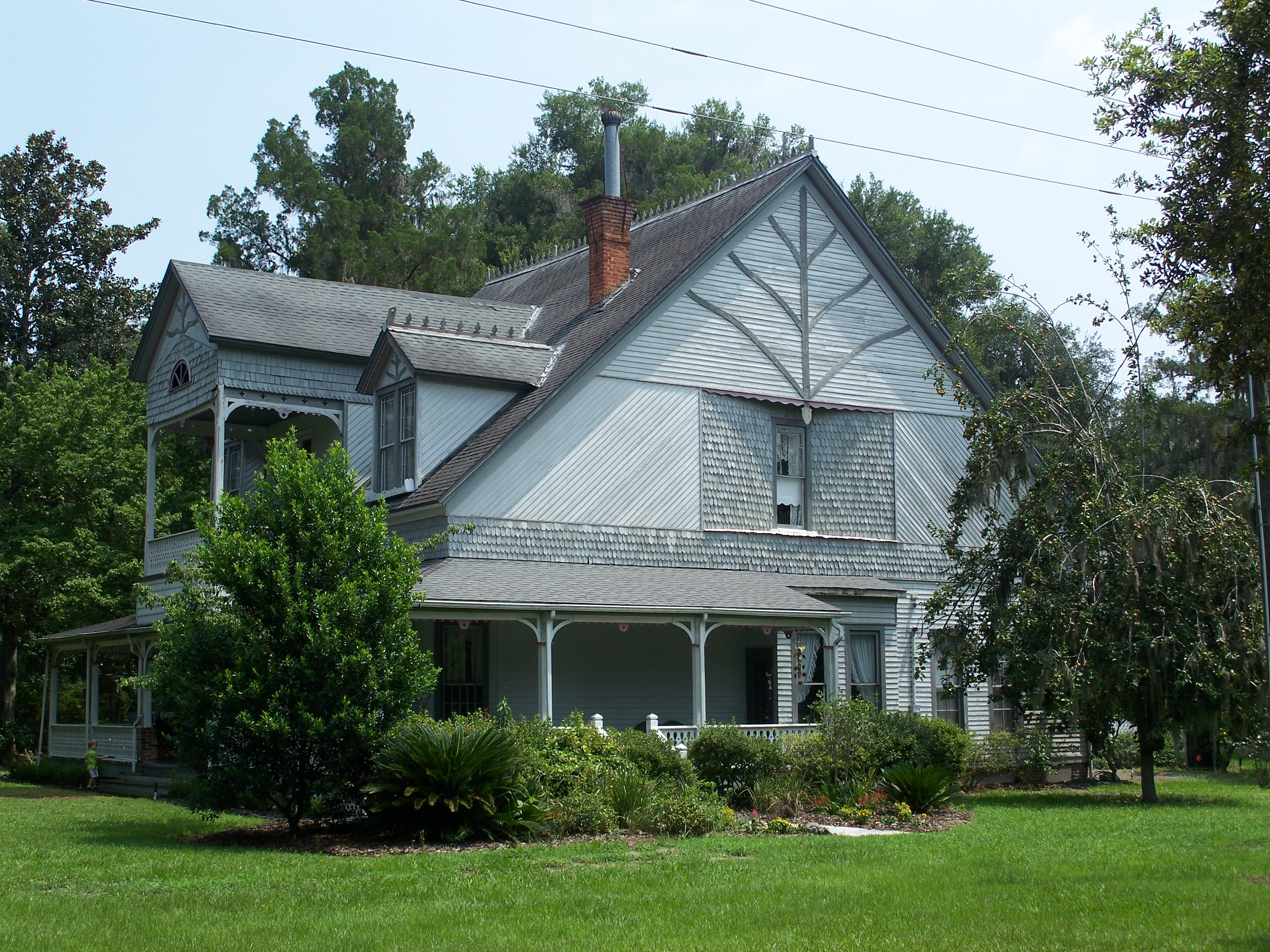

- Location within Florida
- Location: CR 234, Windsor, Florida
- Coordinates: 29°38′58″N 82°11′6″W
- Built: 1890
- Architectural style: Stick/Eastlake
- NRHP reference No.: 73000566
- Added to NRHP: June 4, 1973

The Neilson House is a historic house located on CR 234 in Windsor, Florida, United States. It is locally significant as a singularly fine example of a style of architecture which is exceptionally rare in Florida.

== Description and history ==
The Neilson House is a mortise-and-tenon system of wood-frame construction. Posts and beams are fairly thick in section) creating a rigid frame which requires little diagonal bracing. The house is somewhat irregular in plan particularly in its system of porches and verandas. The rooms, however, present an ordered interior space as they all lie off of a central hall running the entire depth of the house.

It was added to the National Register of Historic Places on June 4, 1973.
