= Island Grove, Florida =

- Unincorporated community
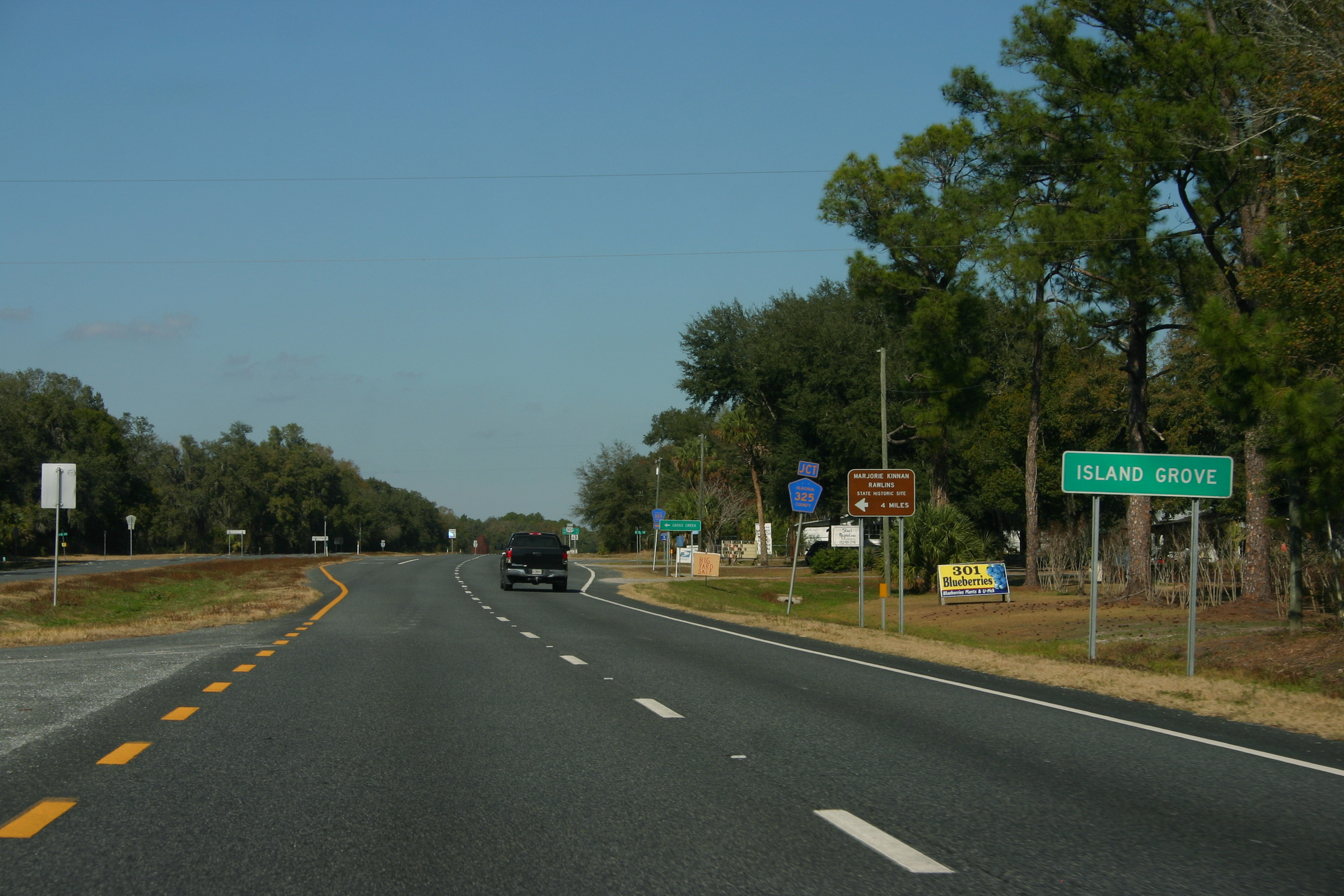
- US 301 northbound is shown at the border of Island Grove, Florida

- Location within Florida
- Coordinates: 29°27′13″N 82°06′23″W
- Country: United States
- State: Florida
- County: Alachua
- Elevation: 75 ft (23 m)
- Time zone: UTC-5 (Eastern (EST))
  - Summer (DST): UTC-4 (EDT)
- Area code: 352
- GNIS feature ID: 284613

Island Grove is an unincorporated community in Alachua County, Florida, United States. Its ZIP code is 32654.

Island Grove is near the southeastern terminus of County Road 325 and US 301. The CSX Wildwood Subdivision passes through the community. Residents of Island Grove are zoned for their children to attend Chester Shell Elementary School and Hawthorne JR/SR High, both in Hawthorne, Florida. Island Grove is immortalized in the writings of Marjorie Kinnan Rawlings, who lived northwest of Island Grove at Cross Creek, Florida.

== See also ==
- Island Grove Masonic Lodge No. 125
