= Evinston Community Store and Post Office =

- U.S. National Register of Historic Places
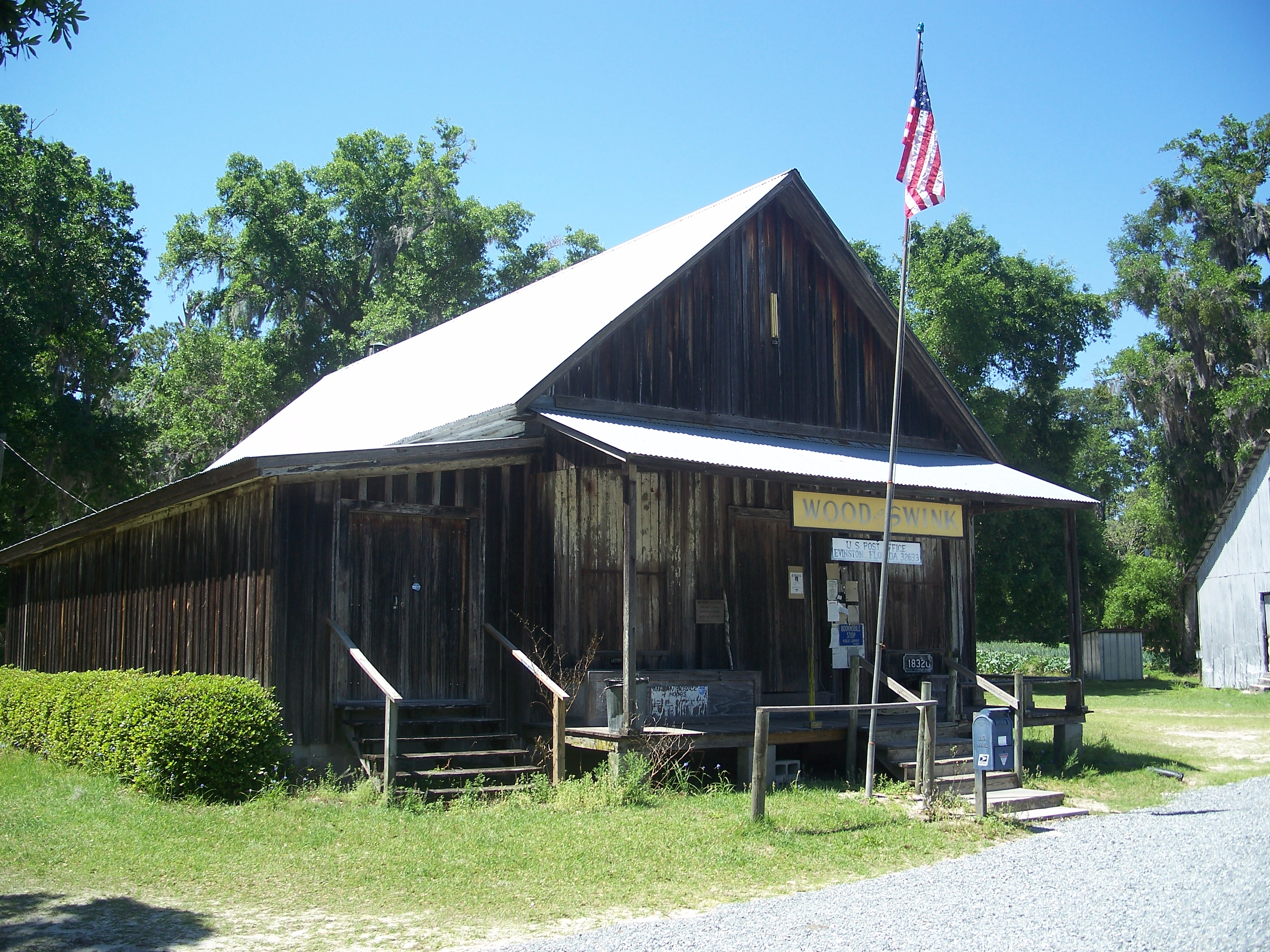
- Wood & Swink / Old Post Office

- Location within Florida Location within the United States
- Location: Evinston, Florida, USA
- Coordinates: 29°29′6″N 82°13′34″W
- Built: circa 1882
- NRHP reference No.: 89000321
- Added to NRHP: May 5, 1989

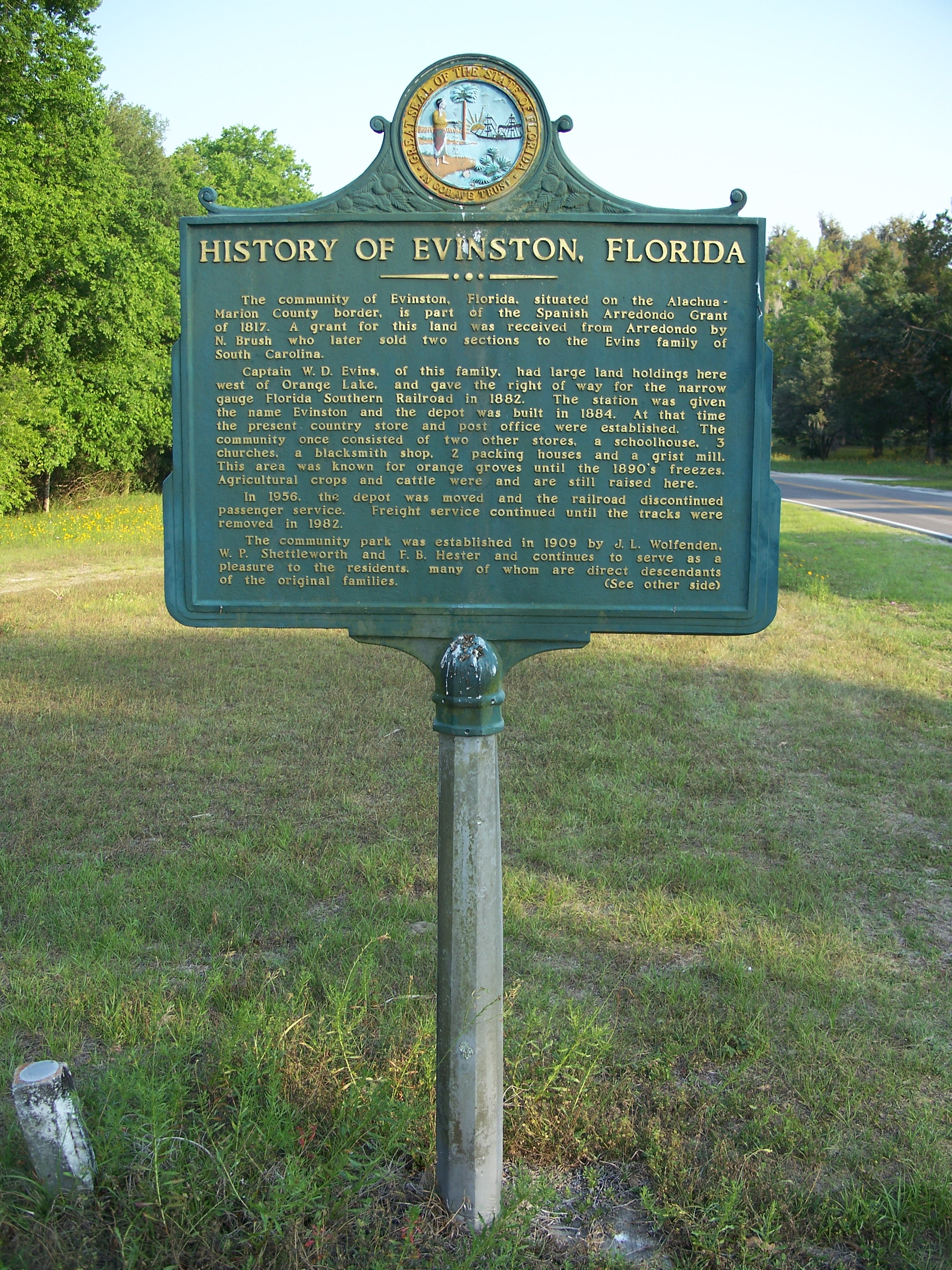
Historic marker for the post office

The Evinston Community Store and Post Office (also known as the Fred Wood Store or Wood & Swink) is a historic combined store and post office in Evinston, Florida, United States. It is located on CR 225, north of the Alachua/Marion county border. The address is 18320 Southeast County Road 225. On May 5, 1989, it was added to the U.S. National Register of Historic Places.

== See also ==
- List of United States post offices
