= Rochelle School =

- U.S. National Register of Historic Places
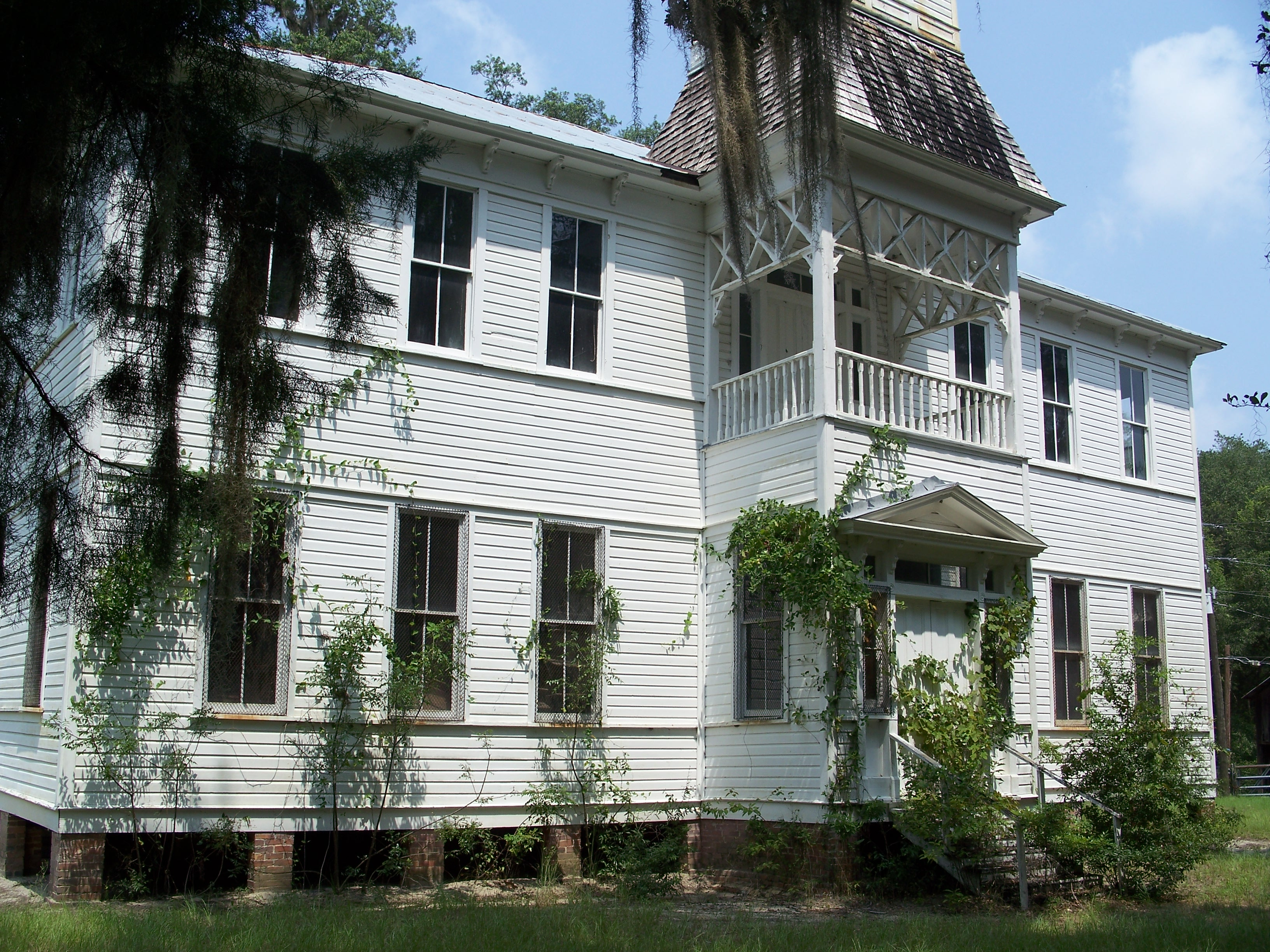

- Location within Florida Location within the United States
- Location: Rochelle, Florida
- Coordinates: 29°35′34″N 82°13′25″W
- NRHP reference No.: 73000565
- Added to NRHP: April 2, 1973

The Rochelle School, which was previously known as the Martha Perry Institute, is a historic site in Rochelle, Florida. The school was built on land given by Sallie Perry, daughter of Madison Starke Perry, and named for her mother Martha Perry. It is located off SR 234. On April 2, 1973, it was added to the U.S. National Register of Historic Places.
