= Howren =

Howren is a surname. Notable people with the surname include:

- Evelyn Howren (1917–1998), American aviator
- Henry Durant Howren, American politician
- Robert Hudson Howren, minister in the Methodist Episcopal Church
- Skyler Howren (fl. 2015–2016), former rhythm guitar player for the American heavy metal band Once Human
