= Turkey Creek Preserve =

Coordinates: 29.746°N 82.415°W

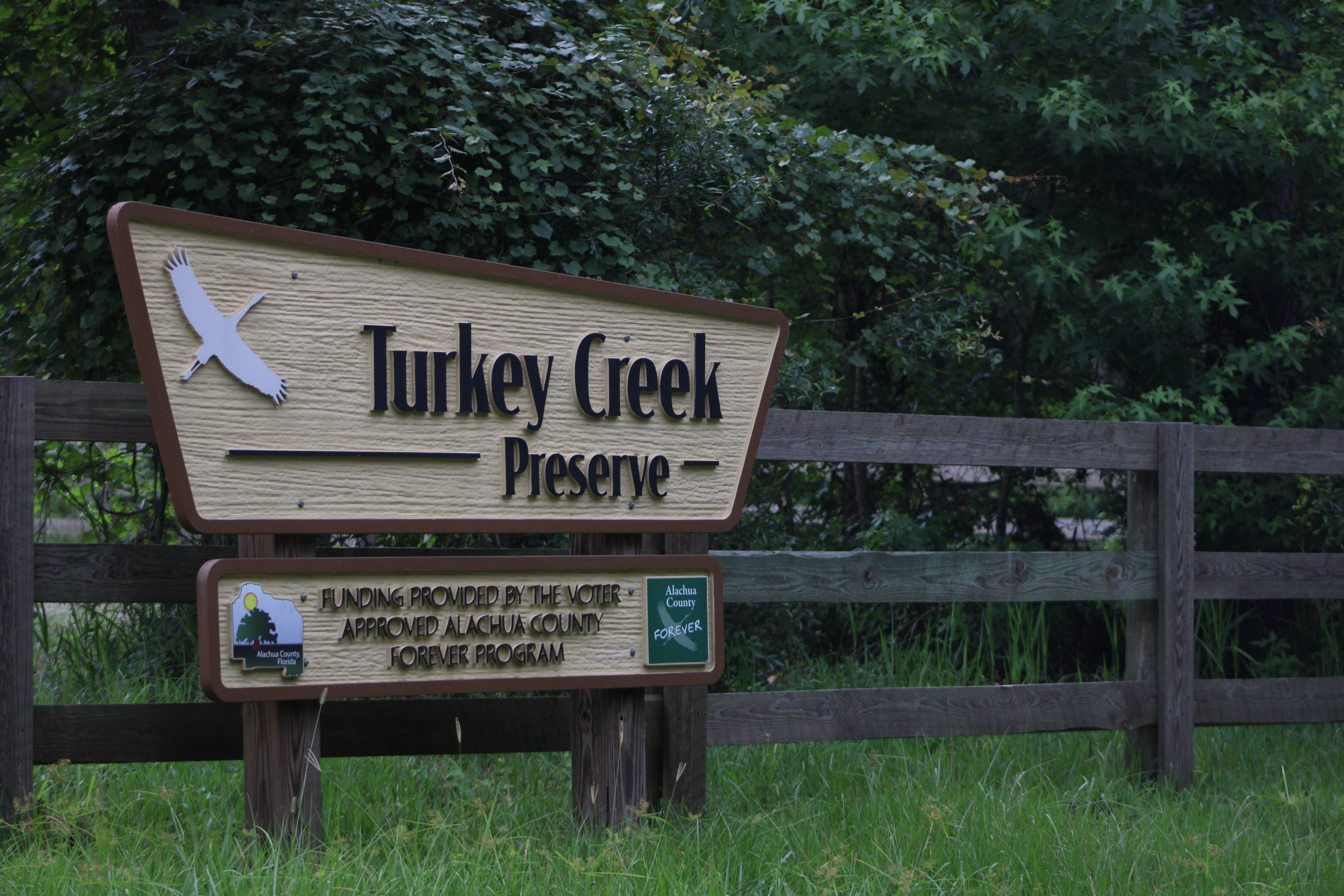
Entrance signage at Turkey Creek Preserve

Turkey Creek Preserve is a 375-acre preserve located in the Turkey Creek community of Alachua County, Florida.

== Geography ==
Turkey Creek Preserve is located at 6300 NW 93rd Ave, west of Northwest 59th Terrace and north of Northwest 93rd Avenue in Alachua County, Florida. It borders San Felasco Hammock Preserve State Park. The preserve harbors nearly a mile of its namesake Turkey Creek's waters. Two miles away is Four Creeks Preserve, which opened to the public in 2019, and houses the Turkey, Blues, Possum, and Hogtown Creeks. Turkey Creek Forest is also the name of a residential area that lies north of Four Creeks Preserve.

== Trails ==
The preserve contains 5 miles of marked trails, open to hikers. Additionally, off-road bicycling and equestrian use is allowed on select trails. The preserve has trailheads at Northwest 93rd Avenue and Northwest 59th Terrace.

== History ==
For much of the 20th century, the Cellon family owned the area, using it as pasture. Nearby Cellon Oak Park in Gainesville is named after the family. The land was once set to be used for housing for the Turkey Creek community, of which there are around 2,200 residents, as of 2021.

Using a combination of Wild Spaces Public Places (Note: According to The Gainesville Sun, "Wild Spaces Public Places is the twice voter-approved half-cent sales tax collected to acquire and improve environmentally sensitive lands and to create, improve and maintain parks and recreational facilities", and is in place through the end of 2024.) funds and a $1.5 million grant from the Florida Communities Trust, Alachua County purchased the preserve from the Gainesville Investment Group for $4 million in 2009. A management plan for the preserve was approved in 2012. The preserve underwent over a decade of restoration; trash and exotic plants were removed, while native plants were introduced to replace them. Timber harvesting of planted slash pine was a central step of the preserve's development process, which also saw a wild hog population controlled. A parking lot was also added to the area. The preserve was officially opened in 2021, in Alachua's Turkey Creek community.
