= Quentin V. Long =

American politician (1918–1997)

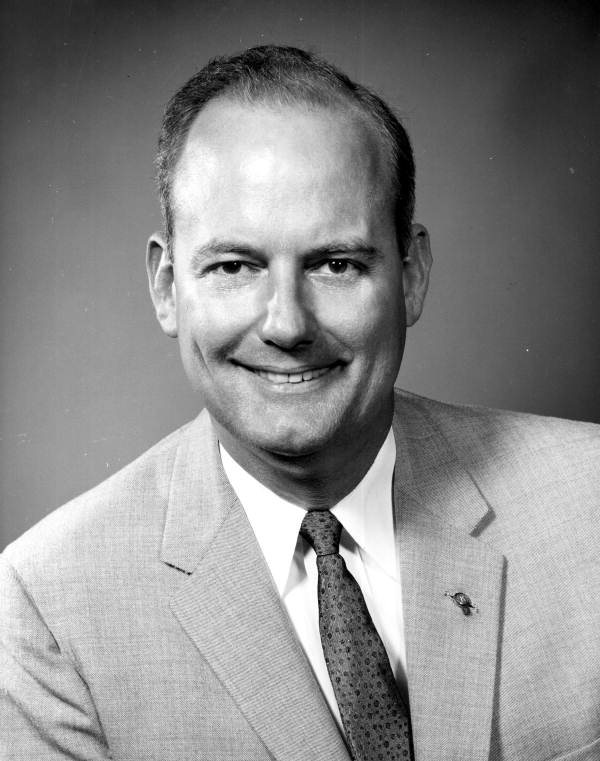
- Long in 1963

Member of the Florida House of Representatives from Broward County
- In office 1962–???

Personal details
- Born: 1918
- Died: February 5, 1997 (aged 78–79) Alachua, Florida, U.S.
- Party: Democratic
- Spouse: Dorothy Long

Quentin V. Long (1918 – February 5, 1997) was an American politician. He served as a Democratic member of the Florida House of Representatives.

== Life and career ==
Long attended Miami Edison Senior High School and served in the United States Navy during World War II.

In 1962, Long was elected to the Florida House of Representatives.

Long died in February 1997 in Alachua, Florida, at the age of 78.
