= Battle of San Felasco Hammock =

Battle of the Second Seminole War

Coordinates: 29.7407°N 82.4445°W

- Part of Second Seminole War
Date	September 18, 1836
Location	Newnansville, Florida
Result	United States victory

Belligerents
United States	Seminole

Commanders and leaders
John Warren	Unknown

Strength
100 (per Mahon); 150 (per Yelton)	Estimated 300

Casualties and losses
1 killed	5 wounded

The Battle of San Felasco Hammock took place during the Second Seminole War, fought by Florida's Seminole Indians to prevent their removal to the Arkansas Territory in accordance with the Indian Removal Act of 1830.

The town of Newnansville, Florida had grown up along the Bellamy Road near the natural bridge over the Santa Fe River. It is not known how early people had settled in the area, but Dell's post office was established there in January 1826. Newnansville was named the seat for Alachua County in 1828. When the Second Seminole War started in 1835, settlers in outlying areas sought refuge in Newnansville. The county courthouse and the jail were fortified. By December 1835, 259 soldiers were stationed at Fort Gilliland in Newnansville.

In September 1836, reports reached Newnansville that up to 150 Seminoles had gathered at Colonel Francis Sanchez's plantation in San Felasco Hammock, 4 miles (6.4 km) south of Newnansville, and were rounding up cattle and moving them south to Hogtown prairie. At the time, Fort Gilliland was the last fort in northern Florida between the St. Johns River and the Suwannee River at which troops were still stationed. On September 17, Seminoles fired on a party of five men attempting to harvest corn about 1 mile (1.6 km) from Newnansville. The men escaped, and soldiers pursued the Seminoles to Sanchez's plantation, but returned to Newnansville after encountering a heavy rainstorm. Scouts sent out that night reported that there were 300 Seminoles at Sanchez's plantation.

Colonel John Warren led 100 (per Mahon) or 150 (per Yelton (Note: Yelton specifies 100 mounted volunteers, 25 regulars, and 25 "gentlemen citizens".)) men, equipped with a howitzer, out the next day towards the Seminoles. The Seminoles attacked the troops when they were about 0.75 miles (1.21 km) from the plantation. The Seminoles probably outnumbered the troops, but the howitzer made up the difference. The Seminoles made at least two attempts to capture the howitzer, but were driven off after an hour-and-a-half. The U.S. troops suffered one dead and five wounded. Seminole casualties were unknown.

== Sources ==
- Mahon, John K. (1985) [1967]. History of the Second Seminole War (Revised ed.). Gainesville, Florida: University of Florida Press. ISBN 0-8130-1097-7.
- Yelton, Susan (January 1975). "Newnansville: A Lost Florida Setttlement". The Florida Historical Quarterly. 53 (3): 319–331. JSTOR 30145963.
