= William Caldwell Rives =

American politician (1844–1911)

William Caldwell Rives (August 13, 1844 - November 12, 1911) was an American politician from Newnansville, Florida. He served in the Florida House of Representatives from 1889 to 1891 He was also important in the founding of the City of Alachua, as he was a charter member of its incorporation in 1905, serving on the first city commission. He was born in South Carolina and was a private in the 25th South Carolina Infantry during the Civil War. He relocated to Newnansville sometime after 1880.
