= J. Emory Cross =

American judge and politician

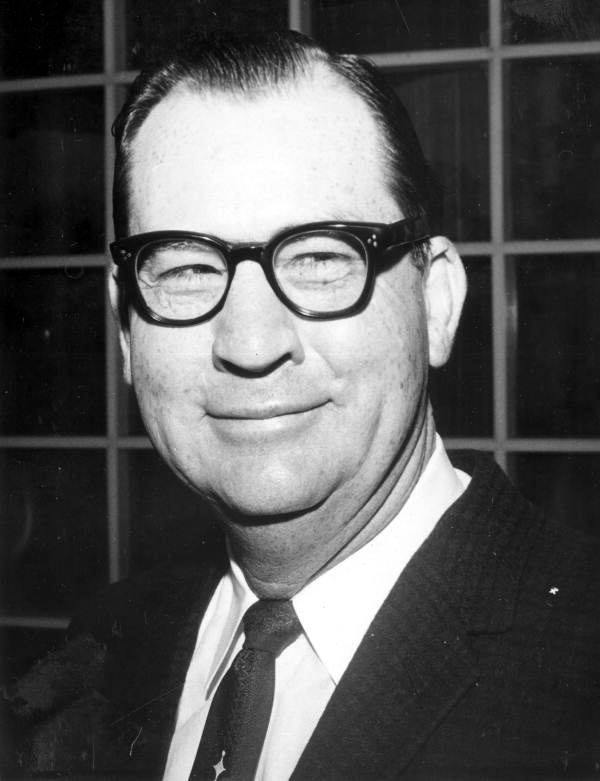
- Cross in 1961

Member of the Florida House of Representatives from Alachua County
- In office 1953–1959

Member of the Florida Senate from the 32nd district
- In office 1959–1967

Member of the Florida Senate from the 7th district
- In office 1967–1968

Personal details
- Born: January 26, 1914 Iron City, Georgia, U.S.
- Died: March 24, 2005 (aged 91) Tampa, Florida, U.S.
- Party: Democratic
- Occupation: Judge

J. Emory Cross (January 26, 1914 – March 24, 2005) was an American judge and politician. He served as a Democratic member of the Florida House of Representatives. He also served as a member for the 7th and 32nd district of the Florida Senate.

== Life and career ==
Cross was born in Iron City, Georgia.

In 1953, Cross was elected to the Florida House of Representatives, representing Alachua, Florida. Cross served until 1959. In the same year, he was elected to represent the 32nd district of the Florida Senate. In 1967, Cross left the 32nd district and represented the 7th district until 1968.

In 1973, Cross was elected to serve as a judge in the court of Alachua County, Florida until 1981. After that, he was a circuit court judge for the Supreme Court of Florida, serving until 1989.

Cross died in March 2005 in Tampa, Florida, at the age of 91. He was buried in Live Oak Cemetery.
