= Mission San Francisco de Potano =

- U.S. National Register of Historic Places
- Location within Florida Location within the United States
- Location: Gainesville vicinity, Florida, USA
- Coordinates: 29°53′1″N 82°33′59″W
- NRHP reference No.: 09000251
- Added to NRHP: April 30, 2009

Mission San Francisco de Potano was a Spanish mission between Alachua and Gainesville, Florida, United States. The mission of San Francisco de Potano was founded in 1606 by the Franciscans Father Martín Prieto and Father Alonso Serrano. It was the first doctrina (a mission with a resident priest) in Florida west of the St. Johns River. The mission was at the south edge of present-day San Felasco Hammock Preserve State Park ("San Felasco" is derived from the 18th-century Seminole pronunciation of "San Francisco").

== History ==
The Potano Indians were enemies of the Spanish for some 30 years after the founding of St. Augustine in 1565. In 1597 the chiefs of the Potano and other Western Timucuan tribes had pledged allegiance to the governor of la Florida, Gonzalo Méndez de Canço, in St. Augustine. Franciscan missionaries began visiting Western Timucuan villages that year, but a rebellion in Guale Province disrupted missionary efforts in Florida for a decade; missionaries continued to make occasional visits, but permanent missions were not established, even though chiefs requested them and returned to St. Augustine to renew their vows of allegiance to the Spanish authorities. The arrival of additional Franciscan missionaries in 1605 allowed the establishment of permanent missions in Western Timucua to proceed, beginning with the mission of San Francisco de Potano in 1606.

Soon after Father Prieto and Serrano established the mission of San Francisco, Father Prieto established the nearby missions of Santa Ana de Potano and San Miguel de Potano. Opposition from the villagers at San Francisco de Potano forced Father Prieto to return to St. Augustine, and the mission became a visita (mission without a resident priest) served by Father Serrano, who resided at the mission of San Miguel de Potano. A fourth mission in the area, San Buenaventura de Potano was established a short time later. Initially, the four Potano missions served about 1,200 Indians, about 400 of whom were at San Francisco. The rapid decline of the Potano population due to repeated epidemics led to the abandonment of the San Miguel and San Buenaventura missions within a few years, with the survivors relocated to San Francisco and Santa Ana.

At least one of the cattle ranches operated by the Spanish in Florida in the later part of the 17th century was located near San Francisco de Potano. Gabriel Diaz Vara Calderón, Bishop of Cuba, who visited the Florida missions in 1674–5, noted that the San Francisco mission was abandoned. However, a mission at San Francisco did exist at the beginning of the 18th century. Starting the 1680s and accelerating after 1700 during Queen Anne's War, English settlers from the Province of Carolina and various Indian tribes allied with them repeatedly attacked Spanish missions in Florida. After the destruction of the mission buildings at Santa Fé de Toloca (a few miles from San Francisco de Potano) in 1702, that mission was merged into the mission at San Francisco in 1703. By 1704 San Francisco was fortified, one of the few Spanish outposts left west of the St. Johns River. The remaining Indians at San Francisco de Potano moved east of the St. Johns River in 1706, abandoning the mission 100 years after it was established.

== Archaeology ==
Archaeologists investigated the site in 1956 and 1964, before it had been identified as a possible site of the mission. Excavations from December 2005 through June 2006 uncovered evidence of a Spanish-built structure that may have been the convento (missionary's residence) or cocina (kitchen) of the mission. On April 30, 2009, it was added to the U.S. National Register of Historic Places.
