= Sounds True =

American multimedia publishing company

- Industry: Multimedia publishing
- Genre: Spirituality, Self-help, Personal Growth
- Founded: 1985
- Founder: Tami Simon
- Headquarters: Louisville, Colorado, U.S.

Sounds True is an American multimedia publishing company founded in 1985 by Tami Simon. The company is based in Louisville, Colorado. The company has published over 800 spoken-word audio and music recordings, books, multimedia learning resources, and online educational programs from figures including Michael A. Singer, Eckhart Tolle, Pema Chödrön, Geneen Roth, and Caroline Myss. The company organizes and hosts an annual event dedicated to personal growth and spiritual transformation called The Wake Up Festival, held in August each year in Estes Park, Colorado.

The company was listed in Inc. magazine's 1995 and 1996 lists of fastest-growing, privately held companies.

== Spoken word ==
The company was started in 1985 by Tami Simon, with a tape recorder and a small studio in Boulder, Colorado. Sounds True has released spoken word recordings by authors and lecturers such as Andrew Weil, Pema Chödrön, and Jon Kabat-Zinn, among others. In 1990, their release of Clarissa Pinkola Estés' Women Who Run with Wolves: Myths and Stories of the Wild Woman Archetype audiotape led to the Ballantine Books publication of her book by the same name. Martha Beck's CD Follow Your North Star was released by Sounds True.

== Music ==
Sounds True produces music CDs and digital music files of spiritual and meditative music. Artists include Krishna Das, Jai Uttal, Nawang Khechog, and Shri Anandi Ma, among others. Some Sounds True albums have been featured on National Public Radio. In 2010, Sounds True entered a licensing partnership with The Relaxation Company and began distributing and marketing The Relaxation Company's products as of April 1, 2010.

== Books ==
In 2005, Sounds True began publishing books. Among them are David Deida's The Way of the Superior Man and The Rational Psychic by Jack Rourke. The publisher has issued numerous books and book/audio CD packages since then.
