= David Deida =

American author (born 1958)

- Born: March 18, 1958; Cleveland, Ohio, U.S.
- Other name: David Greenberg
- Occupations: Author, independent researcher, teacher
- Known for: Spiritual practice, non-dual sexuality, sociocultural evolution

David Deida (born March 18, 1958) is an American author who writes about the sexual and spiritual growth of men and women. His ten books have been published in 25 languages. He conducts spiritual growth and intimacy workshops and is one of the many founding associates at the Integral Institute.

Deida has conducted research and taught classes at the University of California, Santa Cruz, Lexington Institute in Boston, San Jose State University and Ecole Polytechnique in Paris. He is the author of numerous essays, articles, and books on human spirituality including The Way of the Superior Man, Finding God Through Sex, and Blue Truth and the autobiographical novel Wild Nights.

== Early life and education ==
Deida was born David Greenberg in Cleveland, Ohio and later changed his surname to Deida. After receiving the 1974 National Writing Award, Deida was admitted to the Florida Scholars Program at the University of Florida. While there, Deida founded the Plexus Interdisciplinary Center, researching medicine and consciousness in affiliation with the teaching hospital UF Health Shands Hospital.

In 1982, he graduated from the University of Florida with a bachelor's degree in Theoretical Psychobiology. That same year, Deida was granted a fellowship at the Laboratory for Theoretical Neuroscience at the UC San Diego School of Medicine. As a graduate student, he conducted research in the ontogeny of self/non-self boundaries and the evolution of the nervous system and its relationship to space-time dimensionality and was awarded a master's degree in biology from the University of California, San Diego in 1989.

== Career ==
Deida was an instructor in Artificial Intelligence at California State University, San Jose and was elected as a Fellow of the Lexington Institute Boston. From 1976 to 1989, Deida engaged in research with the neuroscientist Francisco Varela and he conducted research with Varela at the Pasteur Institute and Ecole Polytechnique. From 1983 to 2000, he collaborated with yoga teacher Sofia Diaz to develop yoga techniques for intimate relationships. In the mid-1990s, Deida began publishing non-academic books on spiritual practice, sociocultural evolution, and non-dual sexuality.

From 1986 to 1988, Deida studied with the American spiritual teacher Adi Da Samraj and 1988 Deida was awarded the Chateaubriand Fellowship by the French government, for his Ph.D. thesis. Deida began writing non-academic books for publication and departed the university before completing his doctoral thesis. Deida published several papers from 1985 to 1991 including, “The Form of Duality: Objectification as Implicate Time (1985)”, “Some Fundamental Aspects of the Indicational Calculus and the Eigenbehavior of Extended Forms (1985)”, “The Indicational Calculus and Trialectics (1985)”, “An Approach to a Mathematics of Phenomena: Canonical Aspects of Reentrant Form Eigenbehavior in the Extended Calculus of Indications (1988)”, and “Multiplicity and Indeterminacy in the Dynamics of Formal Indicational Automata (1991).”

Deida published the book Intimate Communion in 1995 and It’s a Guy Thing in 1997 outlining his ideas on psycho-sexual development and universal masculine and feminine identities. In 1997 he published The Way of the Superior Man and in 2001 a series of personal essays called Waiting to Love: Rude Essays on Life After Spirituality. His book Finding God Through Sex was released in 2002 and outlined practices for dissolving fear and self-boundaries during intercourse. Deida's semi-autobiographical novel Wild Nights: Conversations with Mykonos about Passionate Love, Extraordinary Sex, and How to Open to God was published in 2005 and tells the story of developing friends, sexual intimacy, and God awareness through the guidance of a spiritual teacher. Deida published his book The Enlightened Sex Manual: Sexual Skills for the Superior Lover in 2004 and he discusses the topics of love and expanded awareness in his 2007 book Instant Enlightenment.

== Reception ==
Deida's ecumenical approach has caused some to question his discrimination for audiences, but Deida characterizes his recent work as "spiritual theater" rather than "religious teaching". This orientation has led one critic to suspect Deida's spiritual depth and integrity, specifically questioning whether his approach has conflated post-modern nihilism with mystical nondualism. Other criticism questions Deida's political stance, alleging an element of misogyny in one of his books.

== Media ==
=== Books ===
- Intimate Communion (1995) ISBN 978-1-55874-374-8
- It's A Guy Thing: An Owner's Manual for Women (1997) ISBN 978-1-55874-464-6
- The Way Of The Superior Man: A Spiritual Guide to Mastering the Challenges of Woman, Work, and Sexual Desire (1997, Plexus, ISBN 1-889762-10-5; 2004, Sounds True, ISBN 978-1-59179-257-4)
- Waiting to Love: Rude Essays on Life after Spirituality (2001) ISBN 1-889762-20-2
- Finding God Through Sex: Awakening The One Of Spirit Through The Two Of Flesh (2002, 2005) ISBN 978-1-59179-273-4
- Dear Lover: A Woman's Guide To Men, Sex, And Love's Deepest Bliss (2002, 2005) ISBN 978-1-59179-260-4
- Blue Truth: A Spiritual Guide to Life & Death and Love & Sex (2002, 2005) ISBN 978-1-59179-259-8 (formally published as; Naked Buddhism: 39 ways to free your heart and awaken to now)
- The Enlightened Sex Manual: Sexual Skills for the Superior Lover (2004) ISBN 978-1-59179-585-8
- Wild Nights (2005) ISBN 978-1-59179-233-8
- Instant Enlightenment: Fast, Deep and Sexy (2007) ISBN 978-1-59179-560-5
- The Man of Zero: A Guide to Primal Power, Boundless Freedom, and Invisible Ambition (2026) ISBN 978-1649634696

=== Audio CDs and MP3s ===
- The Way of the Superior Man: The Teaching Sessions (Audio CD), Sounds True, ISBN 978-1-59179-343-4
- Enlightened Sex: Finding Freedom & Fullness Through Sexual Union (Audio CD) ISBN 978-1-59179-083-9
- David Deida: The Complete Recordings, Volumes 1-3 (Audio CD) (1998–2002), Volume 4 (2009)
- Rhythms of Revelation: Jazz, Jesus and James Bond, MP3 (2009)
- Enlightenment, Marriage and the Dark Side, MP3 (2009)
- Finding Love and Sex Among Vikings, Boys Toys and Superior Women, MP3 (2009)
- Bondage, Boundaries and the Rolling Stones: Spiritual Happiness vs. Sexual Healing, MP3 (2009)
- Emotional Chaos and Authentic Love: How to Help Your Man Navigate Your Heart, MP3 (2009)
- The Third Stage: Making Love Beyond Sharing Needs, MP3 (2009)
- Buddhism, Blowjobs and Chocolate: Spiritual Access to Passion's Portals, MP3 (2009)
- Aligning with Love: Sex, Wealth and Worship, MP3 (2009)
- Craving Nothingness, Wanting Fullness, Celebrating Nowness, MP3 (2009)

=== DVDs ===
- Function, Flow, & Glow (DVD) ASIN B000CEX3JE
- Spirit, Sex, Love: David Deida in Australia (DVD) (out of print)

=== Published manuscripts ===
- 1985 Greenberg, D.R., and White, C.A. “The Form of Duality: Objectification as Implicate Time.” Proc. 1985 Intl. Conf. of Soc. for General Systems Research, I, 156-162, Seaside, California: Intersystems
- 1985 Greenberg, D.R., White, C.A., and Berkowitz, G.C. “Some Fundamental Aspects of the Indication Calculus and the Eigenbehavior of Extended Forms” Proc. First Annual Conference/ Workshop on Sign and Space, edited by G.C. Berkowitz, 54-96.
- 1985 Greenberg, D.R., and Horn, R.E. “The Indicational Calculus and Trialectics” Lexington Institute Monograph Series
- 1986 Deida, D. “Before There Is Perception, What is There? Biological Cosmology and the Limits of Knowledge” Laughing Man Journal, 12:34-49
- 1988 Berkowitz, G.C., Greenberg, D.R., and White, C.A. “An approach to a Mathematics of Phenomena: Canonical Aspects of Reentrant Form Eigenbehavior in the Extended Calculus of Indications. Cybernetics and Systems 19:123-167
- 1991 Berkowitz, G.C., Greenberg, D.R., and White, C.A. “Multiplicity and Indeterminacy in the Dynamics of Formal Indicational Automata” Cybernetics and Systems 22:237-263

== See also ==
- Richard Rohr: Wild Man's Journey: Reflections on Male Spirituality (ISBN 0-86716-279-1)
- Samael Aun Weor: The Perfect Matrimony (ISBN 978-0974275505)
- Dion Fortune: The Esoteric Philosophy of Love & Marriage (ISBN 978-1578631582)
