= Michael Alan Singer =

American author, businessman, and spiritual leader

- Born: May 6, 1947 (age 79)
- Other names: Mickey Singer; Michael A. Singer
- Education: University of Florida
- Website: untetheredsoul.com

Michael Alan "Mickey" Singer (or Michael A. Singer; born May 6, 1947) is an American author, journalist, motivational speaker, and former software developer. Singer is best known for his writings on spirituality, meditation, and New Age philosophy, and three of his books on the subject, The Untethered Soul (2007), The Surrender Experiment (2015), and Living Untethered (2022), were New York Times bestsellers. Singer established the Temple of the Universe, a yoga and meditation center in Alachua, Florida, in 1975.

Singer is also involved in the medical software industry. In 1981, he co-founded Medical Manager, now called Greenway Health, which marketed software that helped medical practitioners manage and digitize their billing records. In 2002, Medical Manager and its subsidiaries were bought by WebMD, in an acquisition valued at roughly $5 billion. Singer continued his work in physician software strategies at WebMD, before resigning in 2005. In 2010, Singer was prosecuted in relation to securities fraud during his time at WebMD, and eventually forfeited $2.5 million in settlements.

== Life and career ==
Singer was born into a Jewish family in New Rochelle, New York, but grew up in Miami. His father was a stockbroker. He earned a bachelor's degree in business from the University of Florida in 1969. An early marriage ended in divorce in 1971.

Singer studied economics at the University of Florida, and was awarded a master's degree in 1971. While working on a doctorate program, Singer reportedly had a spiritual awakening and went into seclusion to focus on meditation and yoga. After refusing to write a dissertation, Singer wrote and submitted his first book, The Search for Truth, to his professor instead. One professor on the committee got Singer in contact with a publisher, Shanti Publications, which published The Search for Truth in 1974. This experience inspired him to establish the Temple of the Universe in 1975, a meditation center in Alachua, Florida, open to everyone regardless of religion. That same year, Singer published his second book, Three Essays on Universal Law, exploring themes of karma, fate, and love.

In 1981, he co-founded Medical Manager, which marketed software that helped doctors manage their patient and billing records. Medical Manager was taken public in 1997, registering $45 million in stock. In 2000, Medical Manager was recognized by the Smithsonian Institution for its achievements in information technology. In 2002, Medical Manager was bought by WebMD, in an acquisition valued at roughly $5 billion after buying each share for $55 each. As part of the deal, Singer remained at WebMD as the company's executive vice president of physician software strategies, and chief software architect of WebMD Practices Services, which Medical Manager was incorporated into. On February 9, 2005, Singer resigned from the company. In 2006, Medical Manager was renamed Emdeon, and was sold by WebMD to Sage Software, a private equity firm, for $565 million; five years later, Sage Software was bought out by Vista Equity Partners, an investment firm based in San Francisco, for $320 million.

Singer published his third book, The Untethered Soul, in 2007. In the book, Singer explores themes of yoga, the meaning of life, and New Age philosophical theories on the concept of self. The book rose to popularity in 2012 after Singer appeared on Super Soul Sunday to promote it, giving his first ever televised interview to host Oprah Winfrey. After the interview, The Untethered Soul was featured as a New York Times bestselling book, Singer's first book to do so, where it spent seven weeks on the list. Singer continued his thesis in The Surrender Experiment, published in 2015, Living Untethered, published in 2022, and Wisdom Untethered, published in 2026.

Singer currently hosts The Michael Singer Podcast with the media company Sounds True, which is recorded at his meditation center, Temple of the Universe. He also collaborates with the motivational speaker Tony Robbins.

=== Securities fraud scandal ===
On December 22, 2009, in relation to his time at WebMD, Singer was prosecuted by the Department of Justice, along with other members of Medical Manager's top management staff, for securities fraud. Medical Manager's business dealings were previously investigated by the FBI and IRS, who executed a search warrant on Medical Manager's offices in Florida and New Jersey in 2003. On January 11, 2010, Singer entered into a deferred prosecution agreement and agreed to forfeit $2.5 million in settlements. Following this, the charges against Singer were dropped. Six executives of Medical Manager eventually pleaded guilty to their roles in the scheme. Singer has contended he was framed by another top executive, who Singer says invented the fraud story in order to "work a deal" with the FBI to reduce their own punishment. These claims remain unverified.

== Publications ==
Singer has published six books in the spirituality genre.

=== The Search for Truth (1974) ===
The Search for Truth (1974) is Singer's first book. According to Singer, this book was written at the request of his professor at the University of Florida. After Singer refused to write a doctoral dissertation, the professor suggested he at least write and turn in something and give him "something to read".

=== Three Essays on Universal Law (1975) ===
Three Essays on Universal Law (1975) is Singer's second book, which continues along the theme of his previous book.

=== The Untethered Soul (2007) ===
The Untethered Soul (2007) is Singer's first New York Times bestseller. It is a collection of lectures which cover topics on yoga, philosophy, the concept of self, the meaning of life, and the theory of mind. The book caught the attention of talk show host Oprah Winfrey, with whom Singer later gave his first televised interview.

=== The Surrender Experiment (2015) ===
The Surrender Experiment (2015) is Singer's second bestselling book. In the autobiography, Singer describes his journey of how he became interested in meditation, how he started the Temple of the Universe and the Medical Manager Corporation, among other things. Singer mixes his life story with teachings of his philosophy, and the central theme of the book is his attempts at "surrendering yourself to life itself", and not letting his personal ego intervene with the flow of life. He identifies The Three Pillars of Zen (1965) by Philip Kapleau and Autobiography of a Yogi (1946) by Paramahansa Yogananda as his influences, naming them responsible for starting his lifelong exploration of Zen and spirituality.

=== Living Untethered - Beyond the Human Predicament (2022) ===
Living Untethered (2022) continues Singer's thesis from The Untethered Soul. It became a New York Times bestseller, Singer's third book to do so.

=== Wisdom Untethered - The Time for Questions (2026) ===
Wisdom Untethered: The Time for Questions (2026) is Singer's sixth book, published by New Harbinger Publications on March 16, 2026. The book uses a dialogue format to address topics including relationships, decision-making, fear, and surrender. Singer announced the book in December 2025.
