= City of Alachua Downtown Historic District =

Historic district in Florida, United States

- U.S. National Register of Historic Places
- U.S. Historic district
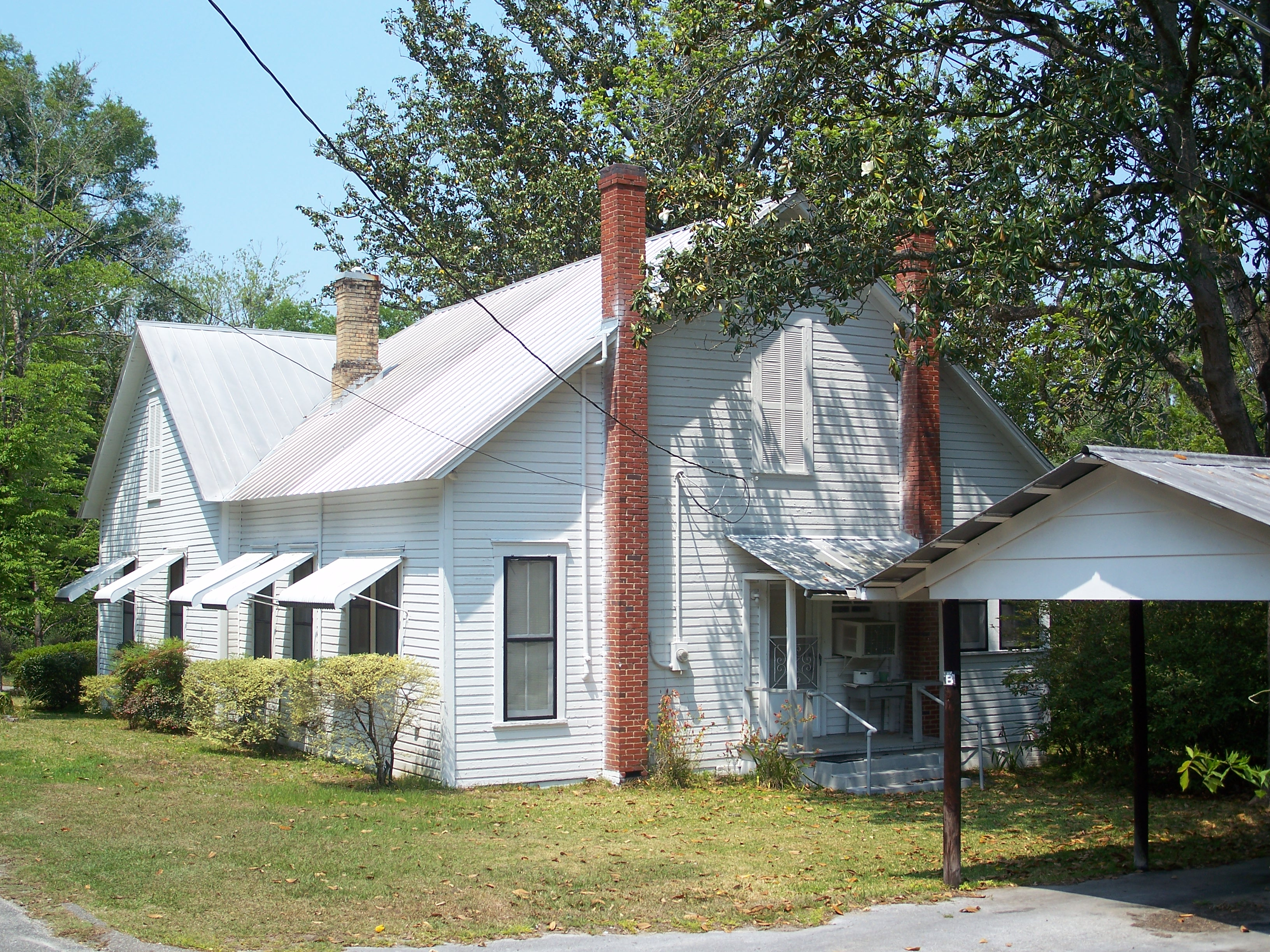
- House in the district

- Location within Florida Location within the United States
- Location: Alachua, Florida
- Coordinates: 29°47′23″N 82°29′41″W
- Area: 490 acres (2.0 km^{2})
- NRHP reference No.: 00000787
- Added to NRHP: July 14, 2000

The City of Alachua Downtown Historic District is a U.S. historic district (designated as such on July 14, 2000) located in Alachua, Florida. It encompasses approximately 490 acres (2.0 km^{2}), bounded by Northwest 150th Avenue, Northwest 145th Terrace, Northwest 143rd Place and Northwest 138th Terrace. It contains 102 historic buildings.
