= Henry Durant Howren =

American politician (1857–1890)

Henry Durant Howren (July 1, 1857 - October 7, 1890) was an American politician from Newnansville, Florida, serving in the Florida House of Representatives from 1881 - 1883. The son of Methodist minister Robert Hudson Howren, he was born in Bainbridge, Georgia and educated at Emory and Henry College.

His father had been serving the Methodist Church in Newnansville for over two years when he completed college, and within a month of returning home, he was nominated by the Democratic Party of Alachua County for the Florida House at the age of 22. His Republican opponent was incumbent Leonard G. Dennis, infamous for playing a role in throwing the 1876 presidential election to Rutherford B. Hayes, and a former Florida State Senator. Howren defeated Dennis by an approximate vote margin of four to one, and was the first Democrat elected to office in Alachua County since the end of the Civil War.
