= San Felasco Hammock Preserve State Park =

State park in Florida, United States

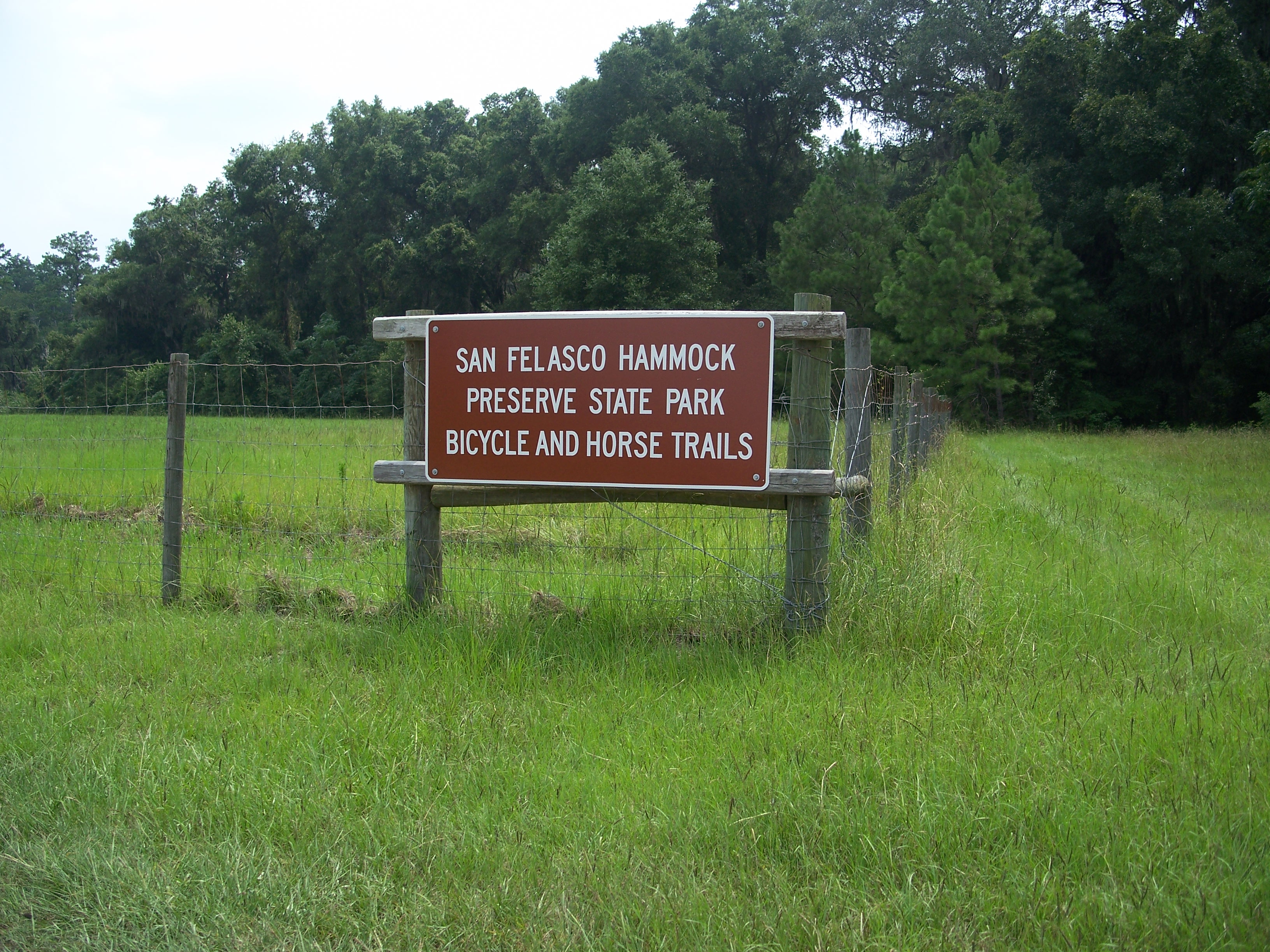
- Entrance to San Felasco Hammock State Park

- Location within Florida Location within the United States
- Interactive map of San Felasco Hammock Preserve State Park
- Location: Alachua County, Florida, US
- Nearest city: Alachua, Florida
- Coordinates: 29°43′44″N 82°26′31″W
- Area: 6,500 acres
- Governing body: Florida Department of Environmental Protection

U.S. National Natural Landmark
- Designated: December 1974

San Felasco Hammock Preserve State Park is a Florida State Park in Alachua County, Florida. It is located northwest of Gainesville, Florida on CR 232 (Millhopper Road), just south of the town of Alachua.

== Fauna ==
Among the wildlife of the park are feral pigs, bobcats, white-tailed deer, gray foxes, wild turkeys, and many species of songbirds.

== Flora ==
Many species of hardwood trees, the sandhill, hydric hammock and swamp plant communities, including rare plants.

== History ==
The park includes 56 archaeological sites, representing various eras from the Paleo-Indian period (10,000 to 12,000 years ago) up to the 20th century. The site of the Spanish-era Mission San Francisco de Potano, on the U.S. National Register of Historic Places, is in the park. ("San Felasco" derives from the Seminole pronunciation of "San Francisco".) Spain began granting land to individuals in Florida after 1790, including a grant of 6,000 acres (24 km^{2}) to S. D. Fernandez and another grant to a Sanchez in the present-day park. Four of the archaeological sites in the park are possibly associated with those land grants, and/or with the settlement of Spring Grove, which existed in the 1830s and 1840s. The Battle of San Felasco Hammock, part of the Second Seminole War, was fought in the hammock in 1836, but the site of the battle has not been identified. Sites in the park from the 20th century include remains of moonshine stills, a dairy farm, tung oil operations, and a commune.

== Recreational activities ==
Activities include hiking, biking, horseback riding, and nature viewing.

Amenities include 65 mi (105 km) of single-track bike, horse, and nature trails.

== Hours ==
Florida state parks are open between 8 a.m. and sundown every day of the year.

== See also ==
- Florida State Parks in Alachua County
- Mission San Francisco de Potano
