= Robert Hudson Howren =

Robert Hudson Howren (August 9, 1811 - September 22, 1889) was a minister in the Methodist Episcopal Church, South. He helped organize the Florida Annual Conference of the Methodist Episcopal Church in Tallahassee in 1845. He was the chairman of the Board of Trustees of the Florida Annual Conference in 1848 which helped establish the first educational institution in Florida, the East Florida Seminary, which was a forerunner to the University of Florida. He became a Methodist minister in 1839 in Lowndes County, Georgia, and served for more than 50 years through south Georgia and north Florida. He was the father of Florida congressman Henry Durant Howren and the maternal grandfather of Florida Secretary of State Robert Andrew Gray.
