= Newnansville, Florida =

- Newnansville Town Site
- U.S. National Register of Historic Places
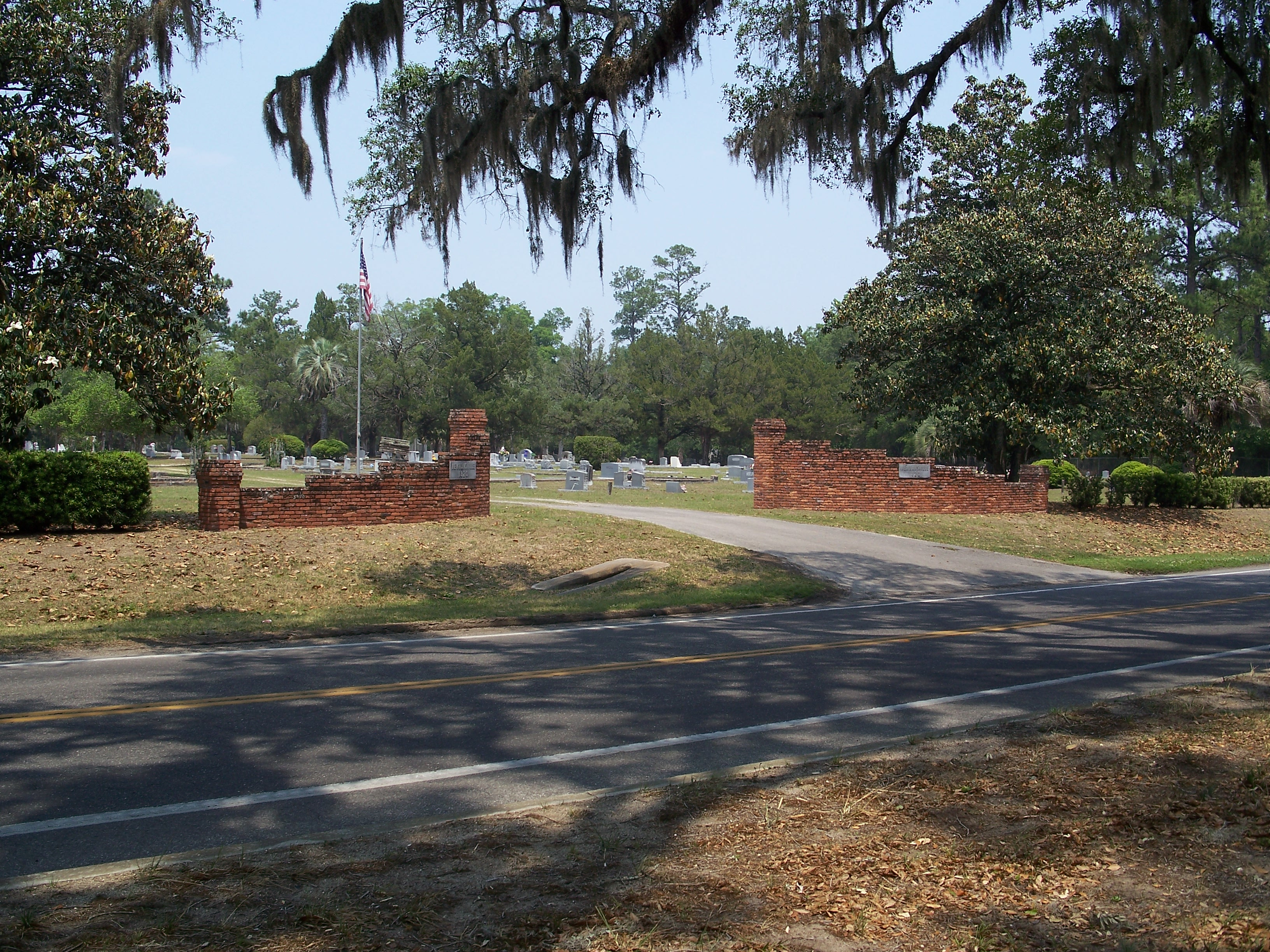
- Entrance to the Newnansville Cemetery, one of the few surviving remains of the town
- Location: Alachua County, Florida, USA
- Nearest city: Alachua
- Coordinates: 29°48′31″N 82°28′36″W
- NRHP reference No.: 74000608
- Added to NRHP: December 4, 1974

Newnansville, Florida was one of the first American settlements in the interior of Florida. It became the second county seat of Alachua County in 1828, and one of the central locations for activity during the Second Seminole War, during which time it was one of the largest cities in the State. In the 1850s, the Florida Railroad bypassed Newnansville, resulting in the county seat being moved to the new town of Gainesville in 1854. Consequently, Newnansville began to decline, and when a second railway bypassed the town in 1884, most of its residents relocated and formed the new City of Alachua. By 1900, Newnansville was deserted.

The site is approximately 1.5 miles northeast of Alachua, on S.R. 235 off of US 441. Containing partial walls of two cemeteries, the town site was added to the National Register of Historic Places on December 4, 1974.

== History ==
=== Bellamy Road ===
In 1824, only three years after Florida became a United States territory (and the same year that Alachua County itself was created), Congress authorized the construction of the first federal highway in the state. It would connect Pensacola to St. Augustine. The Territorial Council commissioned John Bellamy, a Monticello planter, to build it. The project took two years to complete, at a cost of $20,000. The route would become known as Bellamy Avenue. It was a major highway until the Civil War, when other roads became preferred routes. Newnansville was founded on the Bellamy Road.

=== Initial settlement and peak ===
The Dell brothers (James, Simeon, and Maxey), who had earlier (during the Patriot War) visited the Alachua County area, came back to settle there sometime after 1814. The exact date of first settlement is uncertain, though the period between 1814 - 1820 is determined from the date of the oldest burial in Newnansville Cemetery, infant Robert Pyles in 1820. Records also show the Dell brothers staying with Edward Wanton (one of the initial founders of the Town of Micanopy) in the Fall of 1821. Newnansville and Micanopy are the oldest distinctly American settlements in the State.

The Dells constructed a post office on the Bellamy Avenue in 1826 which became the nucleus of the new settlement. In 1828, it was renamed Newnansville (in honor of Daniel Newnan, who had led a raid into what is now Alachua County during the Patriot War) and was made the second county seat of Alachua County. In 1832, Newnansville was included as part of the newly formed Columbia County.

With the outbreak of the Second Seminole War in 1835, many residents from around the area abandoned their farms and moved to the town or nearby Fort Gilliland for refuge. Women and men both worked to fortify the town's defenses, and families doubled up in crowded spaces. Some 300 people lived in tents outside the fort.

In 1839, the legislature returned Newnansville to Alachua County, and it again became the county seat. A United States General Land Office was established in 1842 to make it easier for settlers to buy public land or file claims, rather than having to go all the way to St. Augustine. Following the end of the Seminole wars, the town flourished, becoming the center for trade and plantation life in the area. The county produced mainly corn and cotton in the antebellum years. It built a new courthouse in 1850.

=== Decline ===
The Florida Railroad Company announced its plan to build a line from Fernandina to Cedar Key, passing several miles south of Newnansville. As a result, county residents voted in 1853 to move the county seat to a location along the planned route of the railroad, naming the new town Gainesville. Losing the county seat marked the beginning of decline for Newnansville as settlement moved south in the county. The town was directed to sell the courthouse in 1857, and it was used as a Masonic temple.

After the Civil War farmers developed the citrus industry in the area. Two major factors contributed to the town's continuing decline. The Live Oak, Tampa and Charlotte Harbor Railroad, said to be connecting Newnansville to Gainesville, bypassed the town in 1883, building its line to the south. In 1884 the town was bypassed again, when the Savannah, Florida, and Western Railroad constructed its line a mile and a half to the southwest. A new town, Alachua, grew up at a station stop there. In the winter of 1886, a major freeze ruined the area citrus crop. This major setback, plus the lack of railway connections, led businesses and residents to move to the growing communities of Alachua and Gainesville.

Newnansville was the site of several race-related murders in the mid-19th Century. In 1896 Harry Jordan, an African-American man suspected of the murder of Dr. J.N. Cloud, was burned to death in Newnansville. He had taken shelter in a house, defending himself in a shootout with a white mob outside. They set the house on fire, and he died. In 2021, the Alachua-Newnansville Community Remembrance Project identified eight victims of lynching from Newnansville: George Bibbon (1867), Cooley Johnson (1867), Willey Bradley (1868), Ceasar Sullivan (1868), Harry Hurl (1869), Joseph Hurl (1869), son of Harry Harold (1869), and William Rawls (1895).

Newnansville had been deserted by 1900, and all the remaining buildings were razed by the middle of the twentieth century. All that was left of Newnansville were two cemeteries and the remains of Bellamy Road, closed to traffic.

== Notable people ==
- Josiah T. Walls, Reconstruction Era politician
- Matthew M. Lewey, newspaper editor and publisher, postmaster, lawyer, politician, and justice of the peace in Florida, served as postmaster and mayor (1875–1877) of Newnansville
- Philip Dell, former Speaker of the Florida House of Representatives and President of the Florida Senate
- Henry Durant Howren, former Florida congressman
- William Caldwell Rives, former Florida congressman
