= Alachua, Florida =

- City
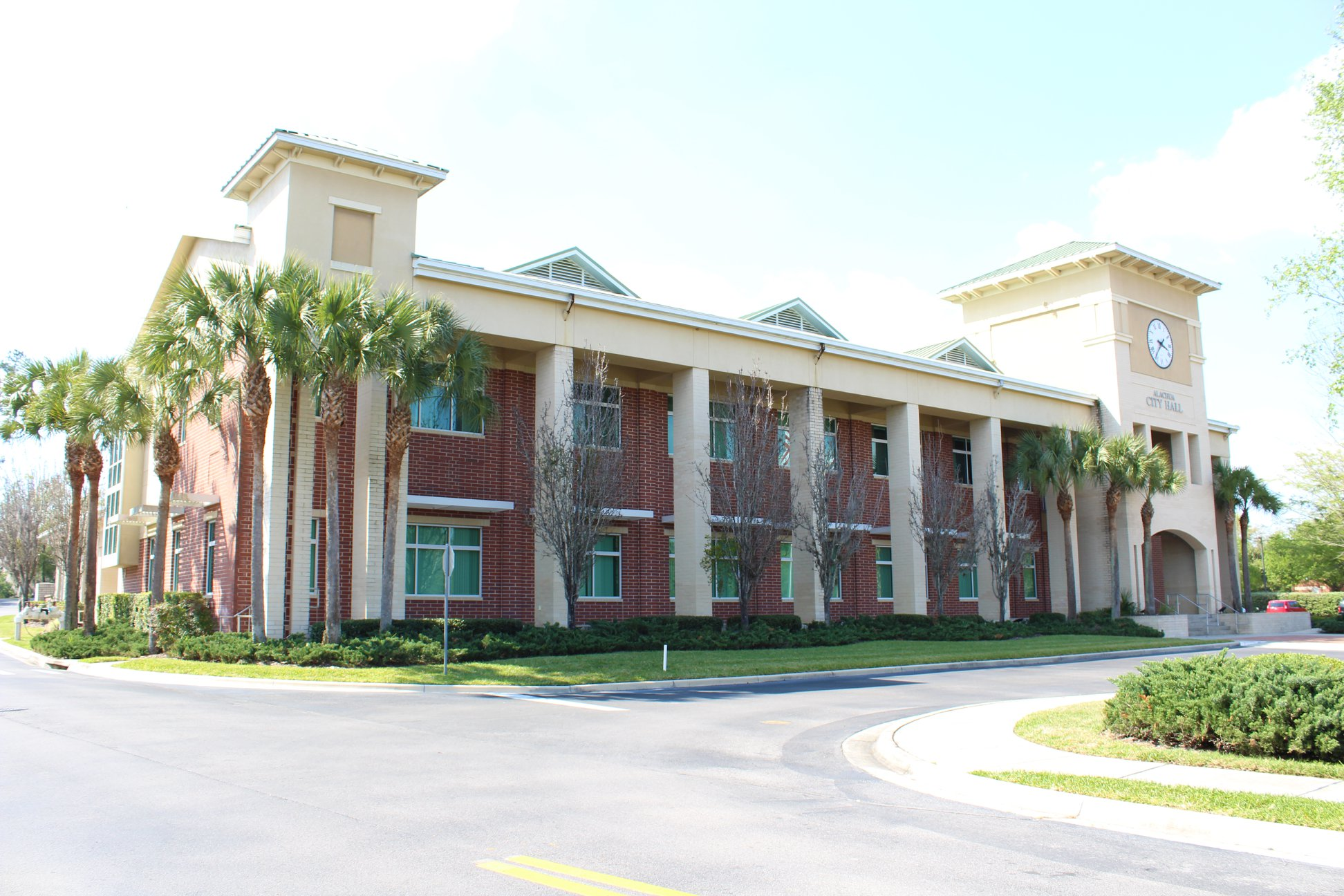
- Alachua City Hall (2022)

- Seal Logo

- Location within Alachua County and Florida
- Coordinates: 29°45′45″N 82°30′28″W
- Country: United States
- State: Florida
- County: Alachua
- Settled: 1884
- Incorporated: 1905 (city)

Government
  - Type: Commission-Manager

Area
  - Total: 36.56 sq mi (94.70 km^{2})
  - Land: 36.20 sq mi (93.75 km^{2})
  - Water: 0.37 sq mi (0.95 km^{2}) 0.11%
- Elevation: 79 ft (24 m)

Population (2020)
  - Total: 10,574
  - Density: 292.1/sq mi (112.8/km^{2})
- Time zone: UTC-5 (EST)
  - Summer (DST): UTC-4 (EDT)
- ZIP Codes: 32615-32616
- Area codes: 386, 352
- FIPS code: 12-00375
- GNIS ID: 2403070
- Website: cityofalachua.com

Alachua (/əˈlætʃueɪ/ ə-LATCH-oo-ay) is the second-most populous city in Alachua County, Florida, and the third-largest in North Central Florida. According to the 2020 census, the city's population was 10,574, up from 9,059 at the 2010 census. It is part of the Gainesville, Florida Metropolitan Statistical Area. Alachua has one of the largest bio and life sciences sectors in Florida and is the site for the Santa Fe College Perry Center for Emerging Technologies.

== History ==
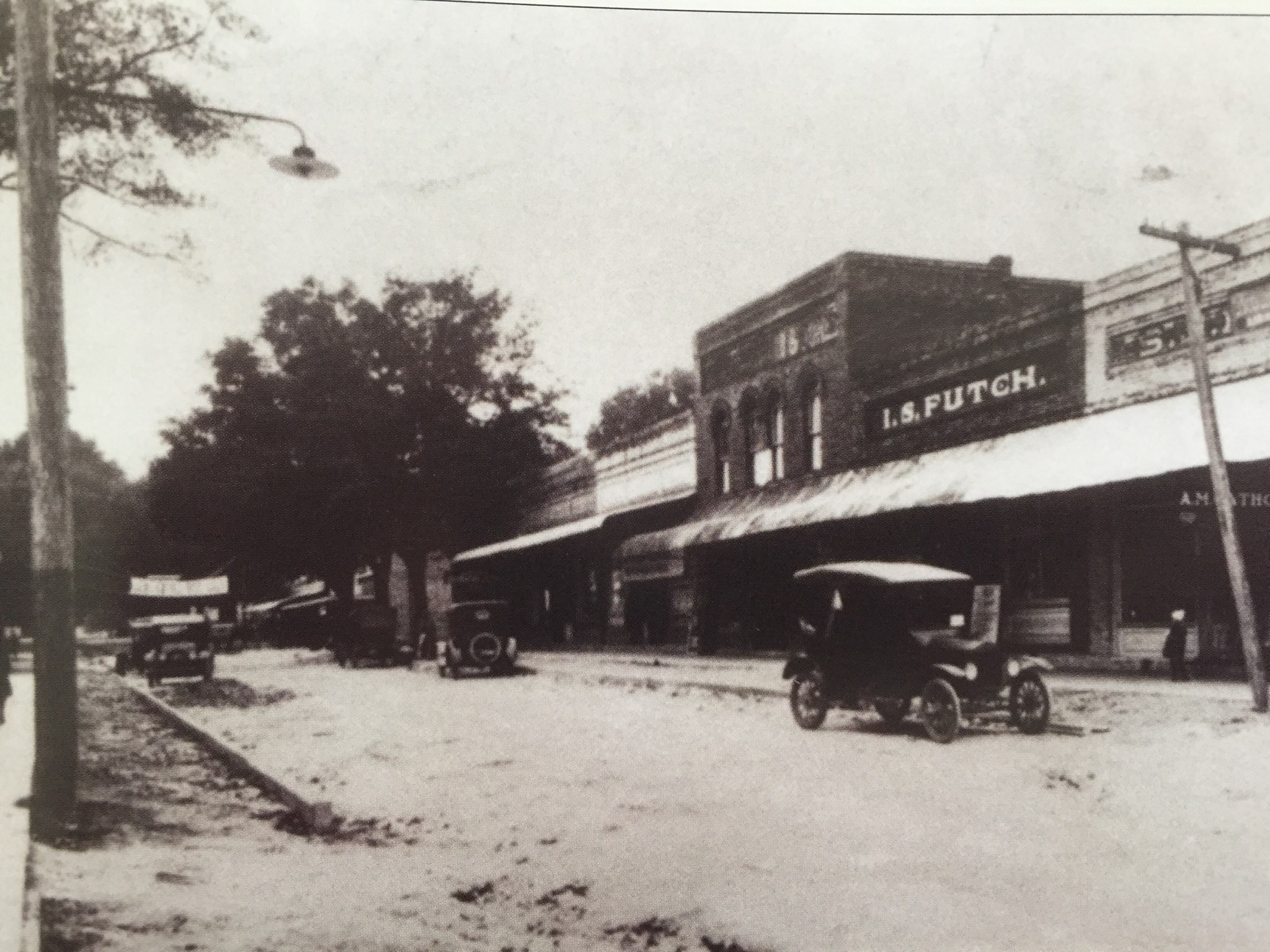
Main Street Alachua, 1910

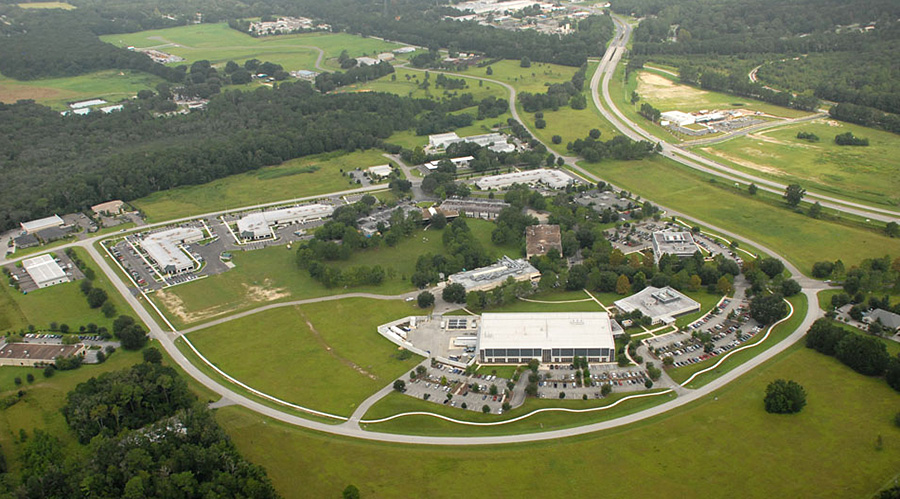
Aerial view of Progress Corporate Park

Evidence of habitation by pre-historic Paleo-Indians exists in several documented locations within the San Felasco Hammock Preserve State Park. In the historic era, the primary town for the Potano tribe that lived throughout North Central Florida also was within San Felasco. This town became the site of the first Spanish doctrina (mission with a resident priest) in the Florida interior in 1606, Mission San Francisco de Potano, and it was the last to be abandoned by the Spanish in the early 1700s due to raids instigated by the British. Nearby to the north along the Santa Fe River was another mission, Santa Fe de Toloca, which was part of the mission chain stretching from St. Augustine to Pensacola.

The area slightly northeast of the current city of Alachua was among the first settled by Americans in Florida in the early 19th century. Many participants in the Patriot War that attempted to force the annexation of Florida to the United States from the Spanish resided there, including the Dell family. The exact date of first settlement is unknown, but the community first known as Dell's Courthouse then later renamed as Newnansville is, along with Micanopy, the oldest distinctly American settlement in the state. The Methodist church that started with the Dell family continues to this day and is the oldest in the state, Alachua Methodist Church.

Newnansville became the second county seat of Alachua County and one of the central locations for activity during the Second Seminole War, with the inclusion of Fort Gilleland within its borders. The influx of settlers seeking refuge within the city temporarily increased the population between 1,500 and 2,000, making it one of the largest cities in the state.

When the first cross-state railroad, the Florida Railroad, bypassed Newnansville in the early 1850s, members of the County Commission voted by a slim margin to relocate the county seat along the rail line in a centrally located, new city to be called Gainesville. Newnansville began to lose influence and, when the Savannah, Florida, and Western Railroad bypassed the city by about 1.5 miles to the southwest in the early 1880s, citizens began to relocate along the new rail line (eventually abandoning Newnansville and turning it into a ghost town) and established the city of Alachua. Alachua was founded in 1884, with its post office opening in 1887. It was incorporated as a city on 12 April 1905, at which time it had a population of 526 people. A third rail line passed through the new city, and a booming cotton industry helped support the building of several lavish Queen Anne-style homes and brick businesses along Main Street at the turn of the century.

Alachua stagnated when the boll weevil nearly destroyed the American cotton industry in 1919–1920, then through the Great Depression in the 1930s. The main industries through the middle of the twentieth century were lumber and food processing, notably through Duke Lumber Company and Copeland Sausage Company, respectively.

Interstate 75 passed slightly to the west of Downtown Alachua when it was built in the 1960s, providing new access and economic opportunity. Alachua faced another downturn with the closing of Copeland Sausage in 1976, and by the 1980s the buildings and businesses on Main Street were in poor shape. A concerted effort by the citizens and local government of Alachua focused on rehabilitating Downtown, and the construction of Progress Corporate Park with the University of Florida led to the creation of the UF Innovate Sid Martin Biotech Incubator which has resulted in the formation of one of the State's largest bio and life science business sectors.

The largest Hare Krishna community in the Western Hemisphere is located in Alachua, with satellite communities throughout North Florida.

== Geography ==
According to the United States Census Bureau, the city has a total area of 35.1 square miles (91.0 km^{2}), of which 34.7 square miles (90.0 km^{2}) is land and 0.39 square miles (1.0 km^{2}) (1.08%) is water.

=== Cityscape ===
Alachua's Main Street runs along a North-South direction and is the heart of the City of Alachua Downtown Historic District, which is listed on the National Register of Historic Places. The rest of the Historic District lies mainly to the west of Main Street and consists of residential structures built primarily in the early 20th century. Main Street is bisected by US Highway 441, which runs East-West along the old Atlantic Coast Line railway. The Historic District lies south of US 441.

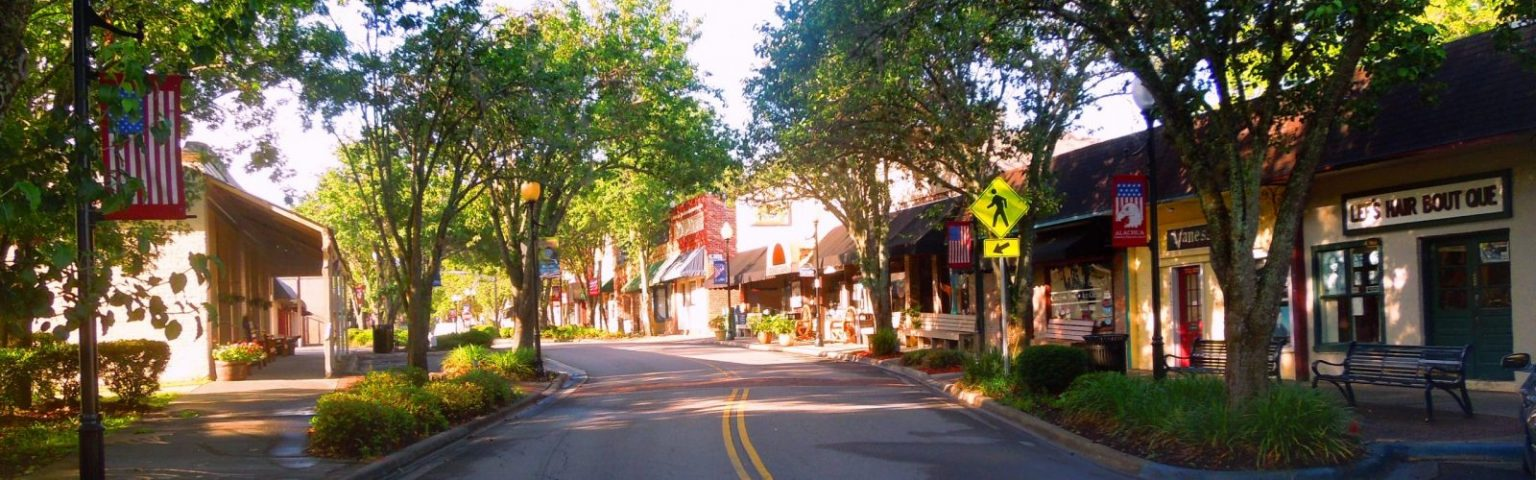
Main Street in 2016

Selected historic structures of note that are listed in the Register:

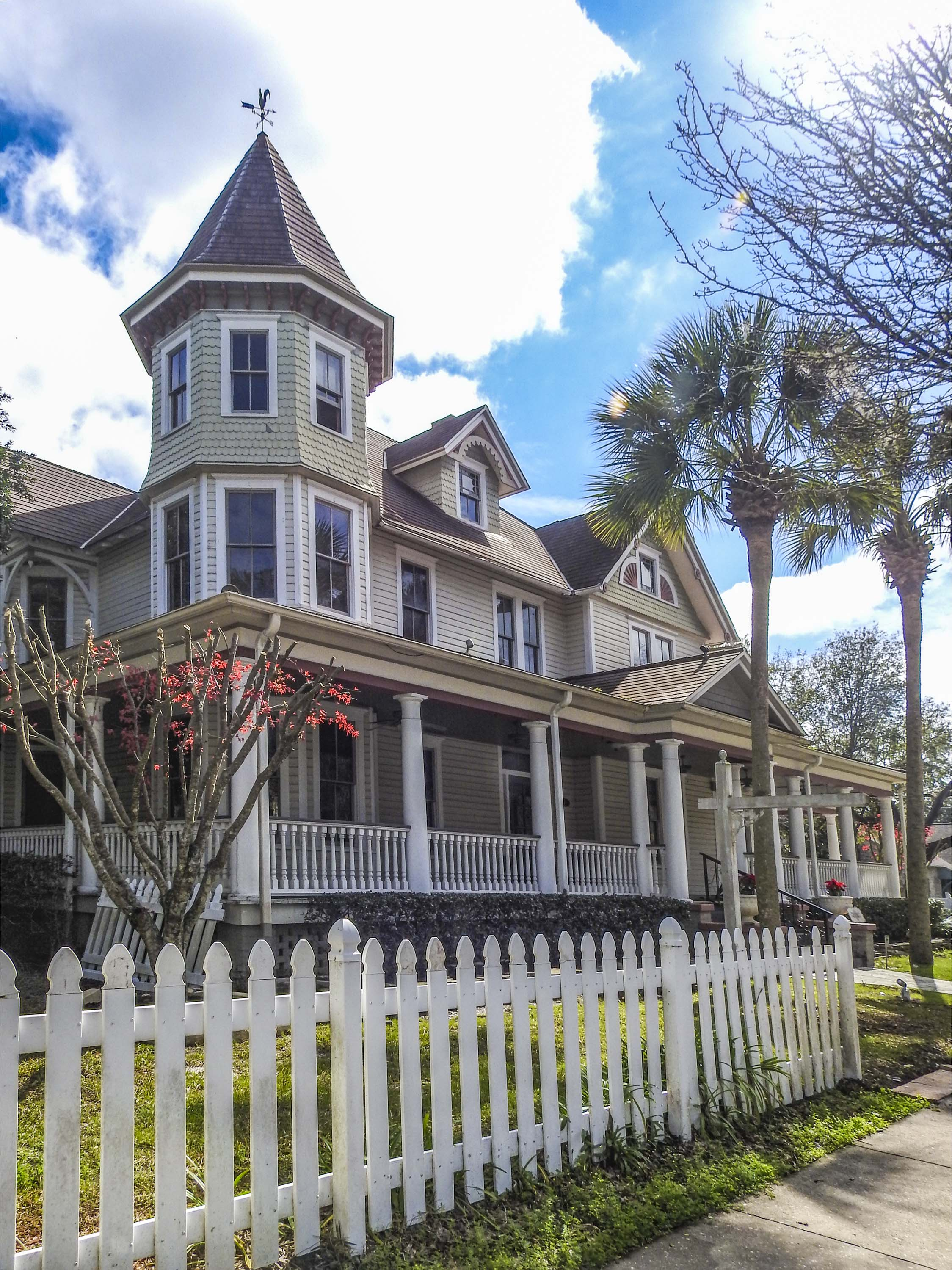
Williams-LeRoy House

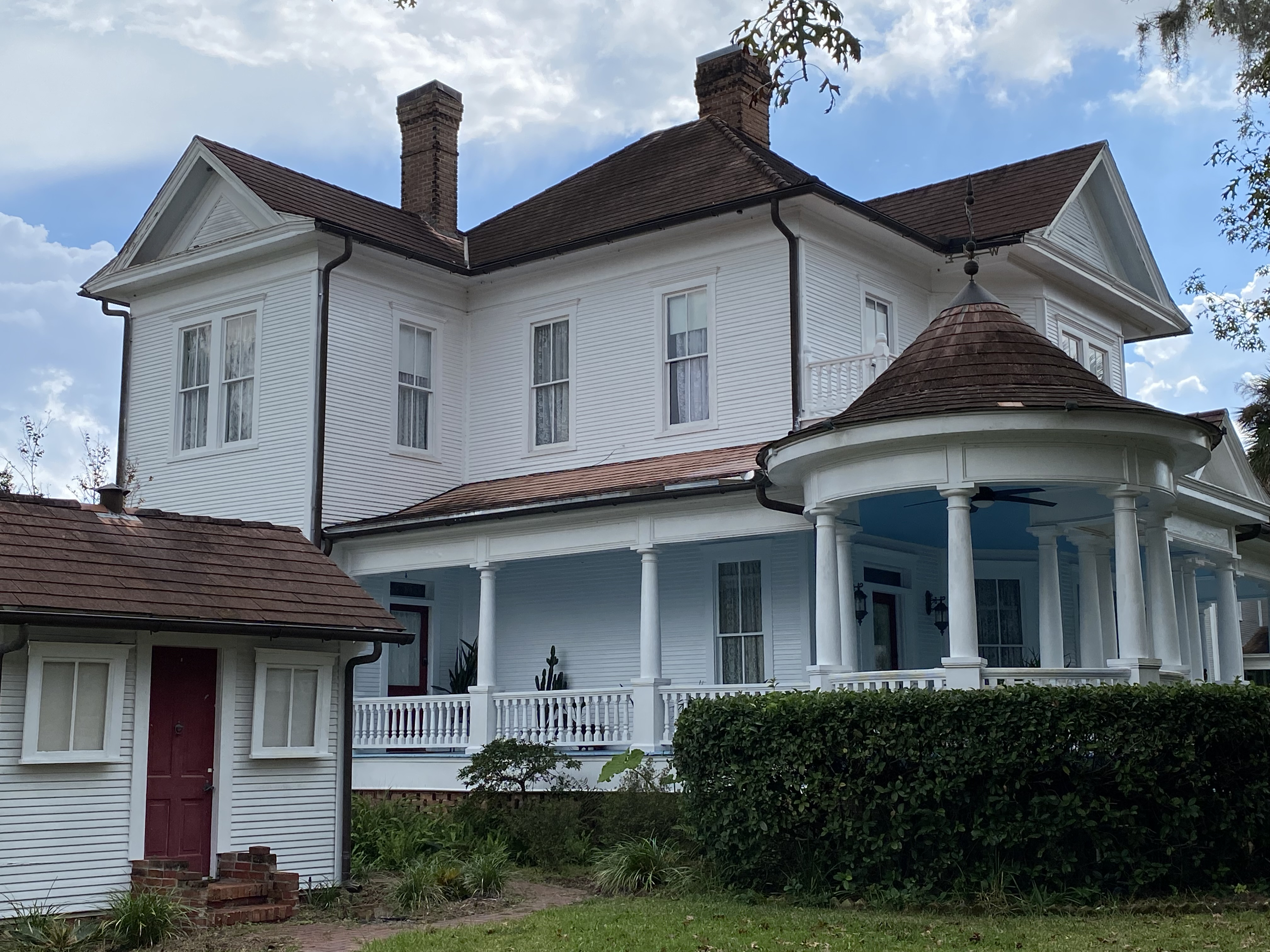
Pierce-Bishop House

Main Street Businesses

- 14925 Main Street (1898)
- 14933 Main Street (1898)
- 14920 Main Street (1900)
- Old Movie Theater (c. 1910)
- Old First National Bank (1909)
- Stringfellow Building (c. 1900)
- Bank of Alachua (1904)
- Old Cigar Factory (c. 1900)
- Sealey Dry Goods (c. 1900)
- Eddy Store (c. 1900)
- Williams Store (c. 1900)
- Enneis Motor Company (c. 1915)

Main Street Residences

- Pierce-Bishop House (1898)
- Mizell-Stephens House (1910)
- David Waters House (c. 1900)
- Williams-LeRoy House (1901)

Businesses line US 441 heading west toward the Interstate 75 corridor and east toward Gainesville. Heading east on US 441 lies Progress Corporate Park, which is the heart of Alachua's bio and life sciences sector. The northern entrance of the San Felasco Hammock Preserve State Park is accessible through the corporate park entrance and also via the San Felasco Parkway, constructed in 2019 to aid in expansion of the corporate sector.

== Demographics ==
Historical population
Census	Pop.	Note	%±
1910	610		—
1920	778		27.5%
1930	865		11.2%
1940	1,081		25.0%
1950	1,116		3.2%
1960	1,974		76.9%
1970	2,252		14.1%
1980	3,561		58.1%
1990	4,529		27.2%
2000	6,098		34.6%
2010	9,059		48.6%
2020	10,574		16.7%
2025 (est.)	10,612	▲	0.4%
U.S. Decennial Census

Alachua is part of the Gainesville, Florida Metropolitan Statistical Area.

=== Racial and ethnic composition ===
Alachua racial composition (Hispanics excluded from racial categories) (NH = Non-Hispanic)
Race	Pop 2010	Pop 2020	% 2010	% 2020
White (NH)	6,098	6,279	67.31%	59.38%
Black or African American (NH)	1,919	2,223	21.18%	21.02%
Native American or Alaska Native (NH)	30	38	0.33%	0.36%
Asian (NH)	198	267	2.19%	2.53%
Pacific Islander or Native Hawaiian (NH)	3	5	0.03%	0.05%
Some other race (NH)	25	54	0.28%	0.51%
Two or more races/Multiracial (NH)	158	521	1.74%	4.93%
Hispanic or Latino (any race)	628	1,187	6.93%	11.23%
Total	9,059	10,574		

=== 2020 census ===
As of the 2020 census, Alachua had a population of 10,574. The median age was 40.0 years. 23.5% of residents were under the age of 18 and 19.3% of residents were 65 years of age or older. For every 100 females there were 87.7 males, and for every 100 females age 18 and over there were 85.1 males age 18 and over.

0.0% of residents lived in urban areas, while 100.0% lived in rural areas.

There were 4,201 households in Alachua, of which 33.4% had children under the age of 18 living in them. Of all households, 48.8% were married-couple households, 15.2% were households with a male householder and no spouse or partner present, and 29.9% were households with a female householder and no spouse or partner present. About 24.3% of all households were made up of individuals and 11.0% had someone living alone who was 65 years of age or older.

There were 4,504 housing units, of which 6.7% were vacant. The homeowner vacancy rate was 2.6% and the rental vacancy rate was 5.7%.

The 2020 American Community Survey 5-year estimates reported 2,557 families residing in the city.

=== 2010 census ===
As of the 2010 United States census, there were 9,059 people, 3,466 households, and 2,152 families residing in the city.

=== 2000 census ===
As of the census of 2000, there were 6,098 people, 2,348 households, and 1,751 families residing in the city. The population density was 211.0 inhabitants per square mile (81.5/km^{2}). There were 2,501 housing units at an average density of 86.5 per square mile (33.4/km^{2}). The racial makeup of the city was 67.56% White, 29.08% African American, 0.15% Native American, 1.12% Asian, 1.13% from other races, and 0.97% from two or more races. Hispanic or Latino of any race were 3.61% of the population.

In 2000, there were 2,348 households, out of which 34.4% had children under the age of 18 living with them, 51.5% were married couples living together, 19.0% had a female householder with no husband present, and 25.4% were non-families. 19.9% of all households were made up of individuals, and 7.4% had someone living alone who was 65 years of age or older. The average household size was 2.59 and the average family size was 2.97.

In 2000, in the city, the population was spread out, with 27.8% under the age of 18, 7.8% from 18 to 24, 26.9% from 25 to 44, 25.8% from 45 to 64, and 11.7% who were 65 years of age or older. The median age was 37 years. For every 100 females, there were 87.6 males. For every 100 females age 18 and over, there were 85.0 males.

In 2000, the median income for a household in the city was $38,075, and the median income for a family was $49,542. Males had a median income of $36,315 versus $28,018 for females. The per capita income for the city was $18,299. About 14.0% of families and 16.0% of the population were below the poverty line, including 22.3% of those under age 18 and 11.6% of those age 65 or over.

== Economy ==
The median household income in Alachua according to the US Census Bureau is $72,491, which is above both the average Alachua County median household income of $57,566 and the state of Florida median household income of $67,917.

Alachua offers the lowest residential electric utility rate in Florida.

=== Top employers ===
The local economy is highlighted by one of the largest bio and life science business clusters in Florida and a growing number of distribution centers located primarily in the southwest section of the city near its interchange with I-75. According to Alachua's 2024 Annual Financial Report, the top employers in the city are:

No.	Employer	No. of Employees
1	Walmart Distribution Center	915
2	Dollar General Distribution Center	776
3	School Board of Alachua County	313
4	Sandvik Mining & Construction USA, LLC	270
5	Publix Supermarkets	243
6	National Resilience (Ology Bioservices)	235
7	Regeneration Technologies, Inc.	210
8	Lowe's	157
9	City of Alachua	155
10	Baugh Southeast Cooperative, Inc. (Sysco)	147

== Education ==
Alachua is served by the School Board of Alachua County, which operates two elementary schools, W.W. Irby Elementary (K–2), Alachua Elementary (3–5), A.L. Mebane Middle School and Santa Fe High School (an award-winning, top 5 public high school in the county) in the city, and the Alachua County Library District, which operates a branch library in the city. Alachua is home to the Alachua Learning Academy, a K–8th grade public charter school that is the #1 ranked middle school and #2 ranked elementary school in the county.

The Santa Fe College Perry Center for Emerging Technologies is located in Alachua across the street from Progress Corporate Park, which houses one of the largest bio and life science business clusters in the state. Biotechnology, AgriScience, and veterinary assisting magnet programs at A.L. Mebane Middle School and Santa Fe High School are intended to help students prepare for the Biotechnology Laboratory Technology, A.S. degree at Santa Fe College.

== Culture ==
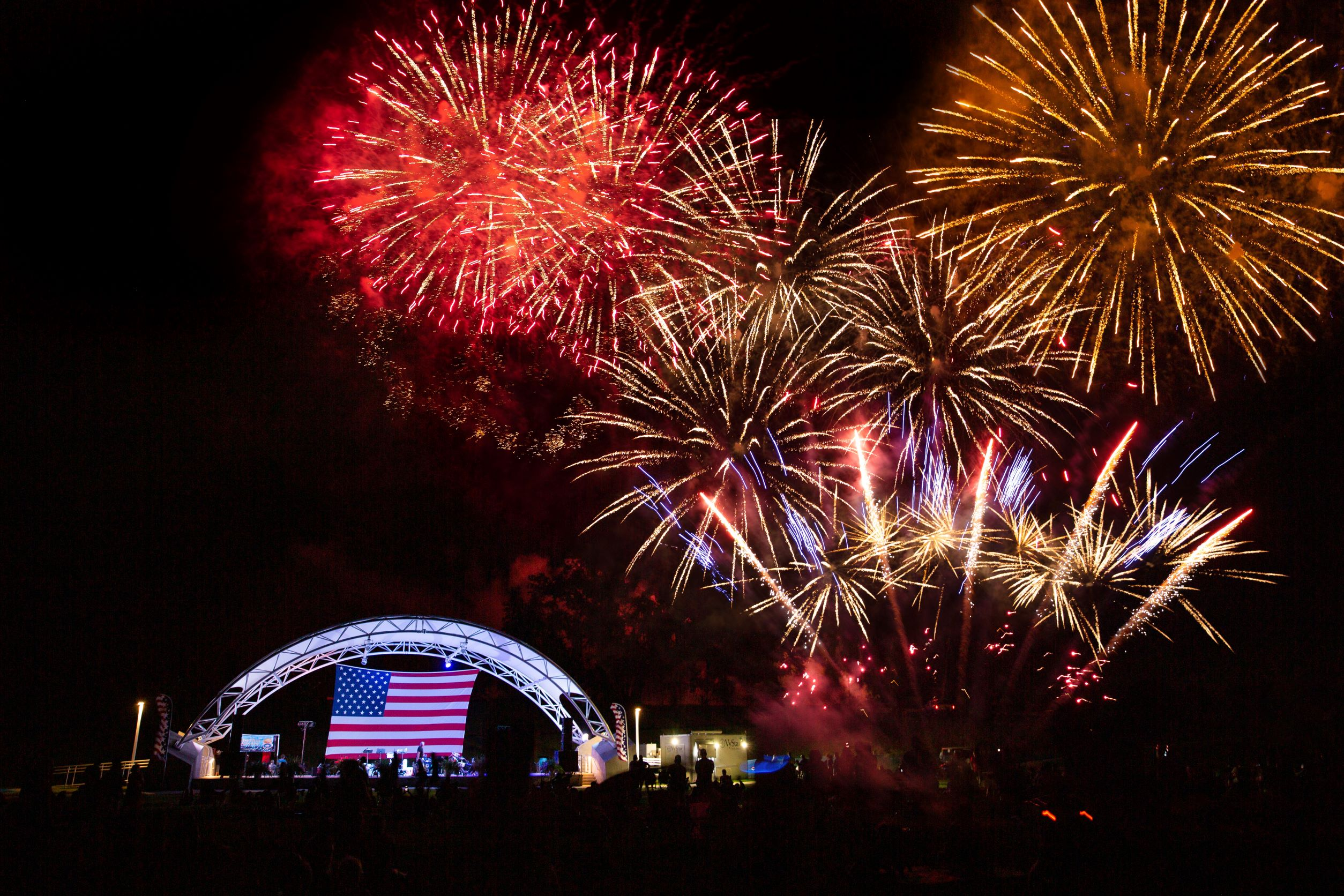
Legacy Park during July 4th celebration

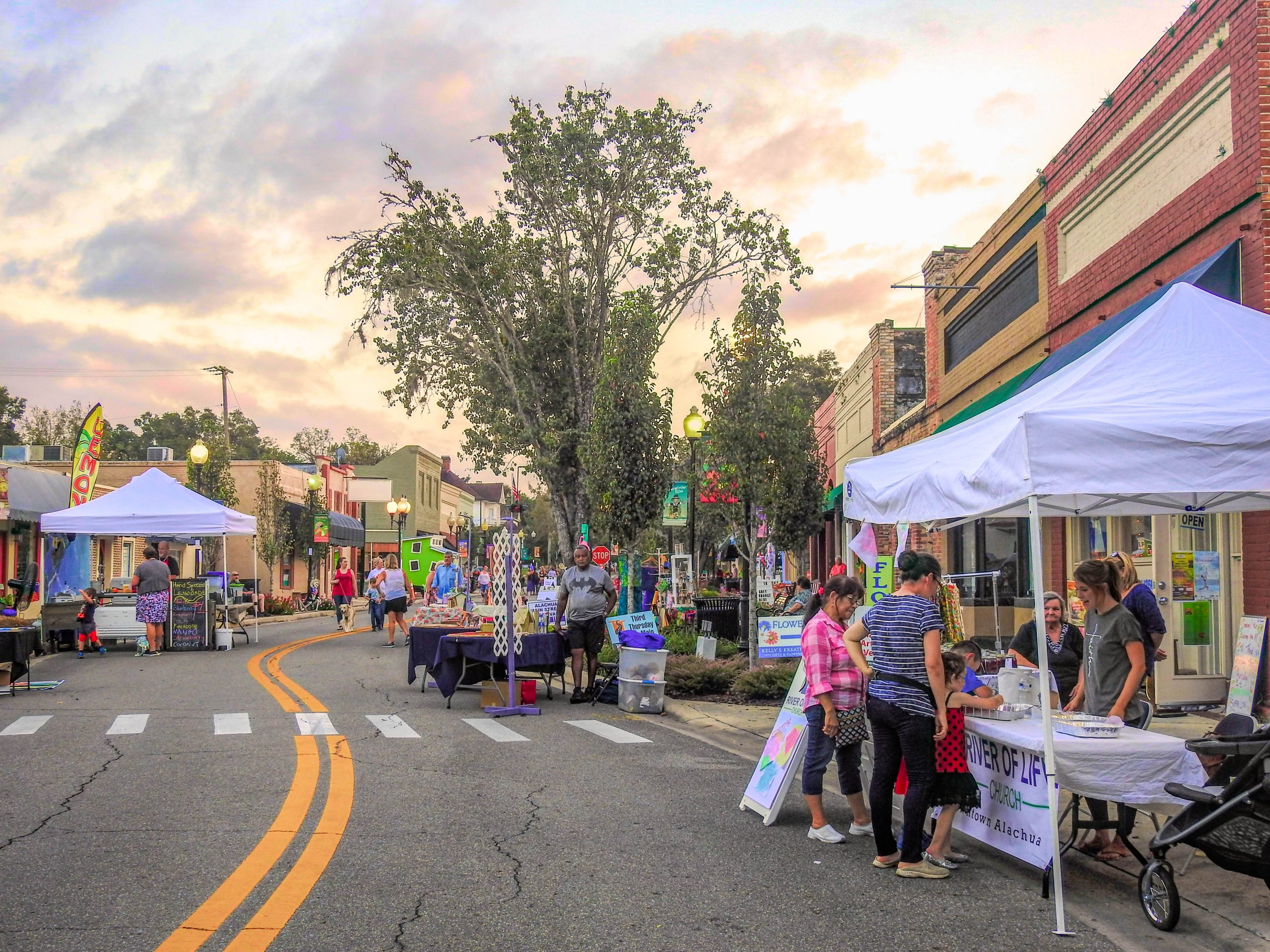
Main Street Alachua

Alachua has a very active recreation program centered around the facilities at Hal Brady Recreation Complex and Legacy Park. Youth activities that are offered include baseball, softball, tackle football and cheerleading, girls volleyball, soccer, and basketball. Adult activities include Zumba and karate as well as open gym availability at Legacy Park Multipurpose Center. Senior activities offered at the Cleather Hathcock Community Center include bingo, arts and crafts, and food distribution in partnership with St. Matthew Baptist Church.

There are several regular events and festivals held in Alachua:

- Fourth of July Celebration (The Largest Small Town Fireworks Display in America)
- Movies in the Park
- Legacy Park Concert Series
- Legacy Park Summer Camp
- Martin Luther King, Jr. Day Celebration
- Nutcracker Under the Stars by Dance Alive National Ballet
- Holiday Nights on Main, including Christmas tree lighting, parade and charity ball
- Trick or Treat on Main Street
- Tour de Felasco
- Alachua Main Street Fall Festival

== Media ==
=== Print ===
The newspaper Alachua County Today has its headquarters in the city of Alachua. The paper serves all the communities within Alachua County, but it focuses on smaller municipalities outside Gainesville.

== Points of Interest ==
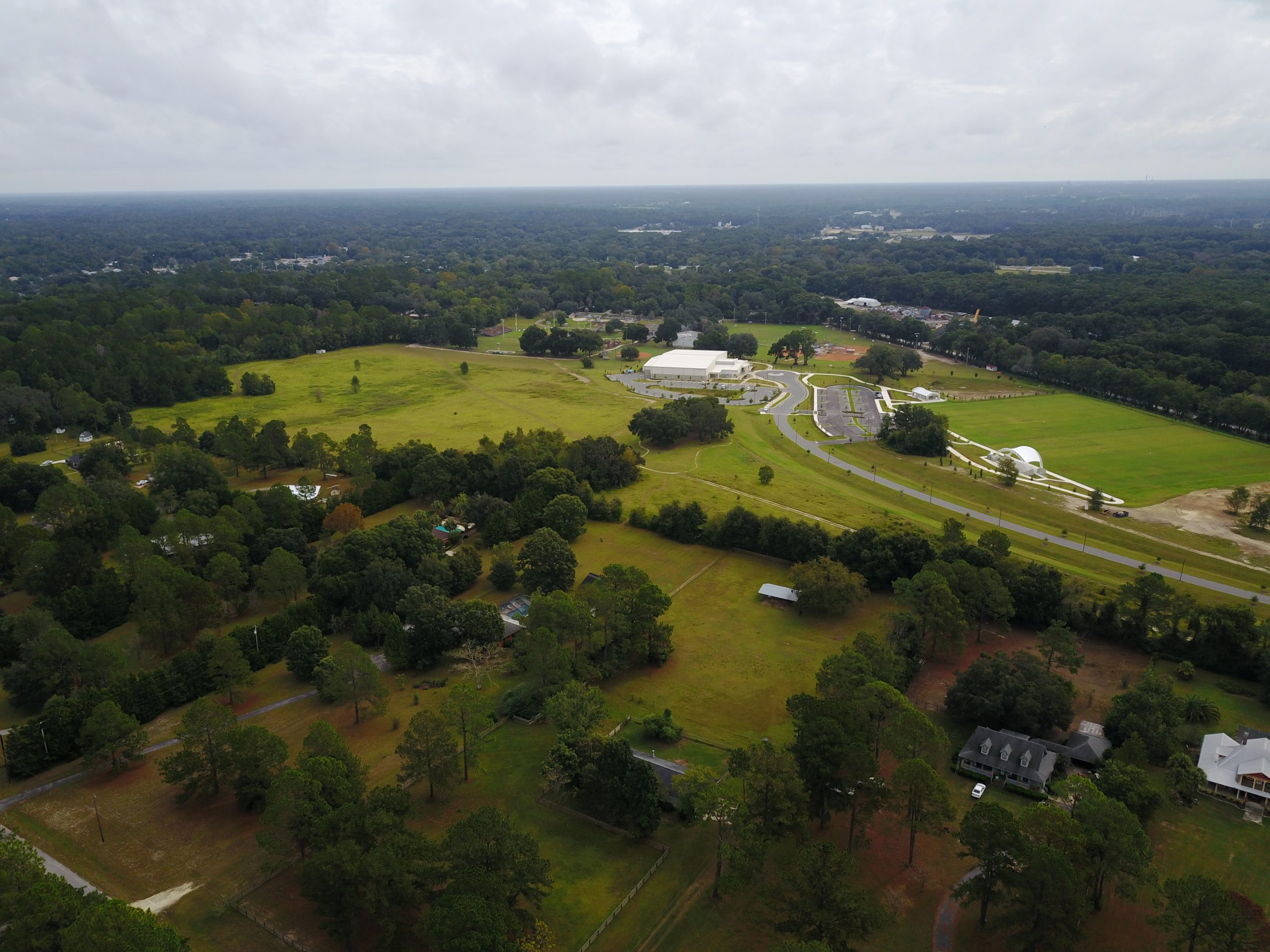
Aerial view of Legacy Park and Hal Brady Complex

- Alachua Hare Krishna Temple
- Alachua Skate Park
- Alachua Splash Park
- Hal Brady Recreation Complex
- Legacy Park Recreation Complex
- Main Street Alachua
- Mill Creek Farm Retirement Home for Horses
- Mill Creek Preserve
- Newnansville Town Site
- San Felasco Hammock Preserve State Park
- San Felasco Tech City
- Santa Fe River Preserve
- Turkey Creek Preserve

== Notable people ==
- Michele Boyd, actress
- Chuck Clemons, former Florida congressman
- J. Emory Cross, judge and politician
- Philip Dell, former Speaker of the Florida House of Representatives and President of the Florida Senate
- Lenny DiNardo, former MLB pitcher
- Dwayne Dixon, former college WR coach
- Hewritt Dixon, former NFL running back
- Craig Fugate, former Administrator of FEMA
- Tracy Ham, former NFL and CFL quarterback
- Jade Jolie, drag queen
- Linval Joseph, NFL defensive tackle
- Matthew M. Lewey, pioneer African American newspaper publisher
- Adam Paine, Black Seminole soldier and Medal of Honor recipient
- Ivan H. Parke, horse racing jockey and trainer
- Adrian Peterson, former NFL running back
- Mike Peterson, former NFL linebacker
- Michael Alan Singer, author
- Rod Smith, former Florida state senator
- Kirby Snead, MLB pitcher
- Freddie Solomon, former NFL wide receiver
- Miranda Uhl, gold medal-winning American Paralympic swimmer
- Josiah T. Walls, Reconstruction Era politician
- Clovis Watson Jr., former Florida congressman and Alachua County Sheriff
