= Terrence Flagler =

American football player (born 1964)

No. 32
- Position: Running back

Personal information
- Born: September 24, 1964 (age 62); New York, New York, U.S.
- Listed height: 6 ft 0 in (1.83 m)
- Listed weight: 200 lb (91 kg)

Career information
- High school: Fernandina Beach (Fernandina Beach, Florida)
- College: Clemson
- NFL draft: 1987: 1st round, 25th overall pick

Career history
- San Francisco 49ers (1987–1989); Dallas Cowboys (1990)*; Phoenix Cardinals (1990); San Francisco 49ers (1991)*; Phoenix Cardinals (1991); Los Angeles Raiders (1992)*; Kansas City Chiefs (1993)*; Jacksonville Tomcats (2000–2003)
- * Offseason or practice squad member only

Awards and highlights
- 2× Super Bowl champion (XXIII, XXIV); Consensus All-American (1986); First-team All-ACC (1986)

Career NFL statistics
- Rushing yards: 237
- Rushing average: 4.2
- Rushing touchdown: 2
- Stats at Pro Football Reference

Robert Terrence Flagler (born September 24, 1964) is an American former professional football player who was a running back in the National Football League (NFL) for the San Francisco 49ers and Phoenix Cardinals. He played college football for the Clemson Tigers, earning consensus All-American honors in 1986. He was selected by the 49ers in the first round of the 1987 NFL draft with the 25th overall pick.

== Early life ==
Flagler attended Fernandina Beach High School, where as a senior he posted 1,683 rushing yards on 200 carries and 20 touchdowns, including one of the greatest games in Northeast Florida high school history, when against West Nassau (October 23, 1981) he had 405 rushing yards and 7 touchdowns. He also practiced basketball and led the district in scoring as a senior.

== College career ==
He accepted a scholarship from Clemson University and became a full-time starter until his senior season. He helped the team win an ACC championship, while finishing with 1,258 rushing yards (13th in nation), 10 touchdowns, six 100-yard rushing games (including 2 games with over 200 rushing yards), 274 all purpose yards in one game (school record), 106.9 rushing yards per game in one season (school record). He was a runner-up in the ACC Player of the Year voting.

In 2013, he was inducted into the Clemson Athletic Hall of Fame.

== College career statistics ==
Legend
| **Bold** | Career high |

| Year | Team | Games | Rushing | | | | Receiving | | | |
| Year | Team | GP | Att | Yds | Avg | TD | Rec | Yds | Avg | TD |
|---|---|---|---|---|---|---|---|---|---|---|
| 1982 | Clemson | **11** | 29 | 120 | 4.1 | 0 | 0 | 0 | 0.0 | 0 |
| 1983 | Clemson | 10 | 31 | 202 | **6.5** | 0 | 2 | 21 | 10.5 | 0 |
| 1984 | Clemson | **11** | 75 | 350 | 4.7 | 5 | 8 | 63 | 7.9 | 2 |
| 1985 | Clemson | 9 | 52 | 232 | 4.5 | 2 | 10 | 54 | 5.4 | 0 |
| 1986 | Clemson | **11** | **180** | **1,176** | **6.5** | **10** | **13** | **163** | **12.5** | **3** |
| | | 52 | 367 | 2,080 | 5.7 | 17 | 33 | 301 | 9.1 | 5 |

== Professional career ==
Pre-draft measurables
| Height | Weight | Arm length | Hand span | 40-yard dash | 10-yard split | 20-yard split | 20-yard shuttle | Vertical jump | Broad jump | Bench press |
|---|---|---|---|---|---|---|---|---|---|---|
| 5 ft 11 5/8 in (1.82 m) | 199 lb (90 kg) | 30 in (0.76 m) | 9 3/4 in (0.25 m) | 4.52 s | 1.55 s | 2.62 s | 4.41 s | 30.5 in (0.77 m) | 9 ft 5 in (2.87 m) | 15 reps |
All values from NFL Combine

=== San Francisco 49ers (first stint) ===
Flagler was selected by the San Francisco 49ers in the first round (25th overall) of the 1987 NFL draft. In three years he only had 42 carries for 145 yards and one touchdown, while playing behind Roger Craig.

After asking for a trade, he was sent along with Danny Stubbs, a third (#81-Craig Veasey) and an eleventh-round (#304-Myron Jones) draft pick to the Dallas Cowboys, in exchange for a second (#47-Dennis Brown) and third-round (#68-Ron Lewis) draft choices on April 19, 1990.

=== Dallas Cowboys ===
A week after Flagler was acquired by the Dallas Cowboys to improve the running game, the team selected future hall of fame running back Emmitt Smith in the 1990 NFL draft. He was waived on September 2, 1990.

=== Phoenix Cardinals ===
On September 26, 1990, he was signed as a free agent by the Phoenix Cardinals for depth purposes, after Ron Wolfley was lost for the year. On August 12, 1991, he was traded to the San Francisco 49ers in exchange for a conditional draft choice (not exercised).

=== San Francisco 49ers (second stint) ===
Flagler was cut on August 26, 1991, when the San Francisco 49ers chose to keep veteran Spencer Tillman.

=== Phoenix Cardinals ===
On September 12, 1991, he was re-signed after starter Larry Centers was lost for the year with a broken foot. He was released on October 29.

=== Los Angeles Raiders ===
On July 19, 1992, he was signed by the Los Angeles Raiders as a free agent. He was waived on August 24.

=== Jacksonville Tomcats (AF2) ===
In 2000, he signed with the Jacksonville Tomcats of the Arena Football League 2. He was switched to wide receiver and played until the team folded in 2003.
