= Apollo Wright =

American football player and coach

Current position
- Title: Offensive coordinator
- Team: Morgan State

Playing career
- 1994–1997: Cheyney
- Position(s): Quarterback

Coaching career (HC unless noted)
- 1998: La Salle (assistant DB)
- 1999: Wagner (GA)
- 1999–2000: La Salle (Co-ST/DB)
- 2001–2003: Villanova (RB)
- 2004–2006: Villanova (ST/RB)
- 2007–2009: FIU (ST/CB)
- 2009–2011: FIU (ST/RB)
- 2012: FIU (RB)
- 2013–2014: New Mexico (RB)
- 2015: New Mexico (ST/RB)
- 2016–2019: New Mexico (ST/QB)
- 2022–2023: Fernandina Beach HS (FL)
- 2024–present: Morgan State (OC)

Apollo Wright is an American football coach and former player. He is offensive coordinator for Morgan State University. He was previously the Special teams coordinator and Quarterback coach at the University of New Mexico and Florida International University. He has been a special teams coach for the majority of his career while coaching at the FCS and FBS levels of college football.

== Coaching career ==
After Wright's playing career ended, he was the assistant defensive backs coach at La Salle in 1998.

He spent the spring of 1999 as graduate assistant at Wagner, before re-joining the La Salle staff as a full-time assistant coaching the defensive backs and assisting with special teams for the 1999 and 2000 seasons.

He then moved on to Villanova from 2001 to 2006. He was the running back coach all six seasons and added special teams coordinator to his titles for the last three seasons.

From 2007 through 2012, Wright was at Florida International. From 2007 to 2009, he coordinated the special teams and coaching the cornerbacks. In 2009, he moved to the offensive side of the ball, coaching the running backs while still coordinating the special teams from 2009 to 2011. In 2012 he coached to running backs but was no longer the special teams coordinator.

In 2013, Apollo Wright joined the staff at New Mexico as running backs coach. He held the same responsibilities in 2014. Prior to the 2015 season, Wright was made the special teams coordinator. The next year, Wright moved in to his current role as special teams coordinator and quarterbacks coach.

Following the 2019 season, New Mexico Head Coach Bob Davie was fired, and Wright was not retained as a part of new head coach Marcus Arroyo's new staff.

In March 2022, Wright was named the head coach at Fernandina Beach High School in Florida.

In 2024, Wright was hired as the offensive coordinator for Morgan State.

== Playing career ==
Apollo Wright played quarterback at Cheyney University from 1994 to 1997, starting for two years.

== Personal life ==
He and his wife, Melanie, have three sons. They have twins, Jayden and Michael, and the third son's name is Mason.

In his two years out of coaching, 2020–2021, Wright published the Amelia/Yulee Neighbors magazine and served on the board of directors of the Nassau County, Florida Chamber of Commerce.
