= Callahan, Florida =

- Town
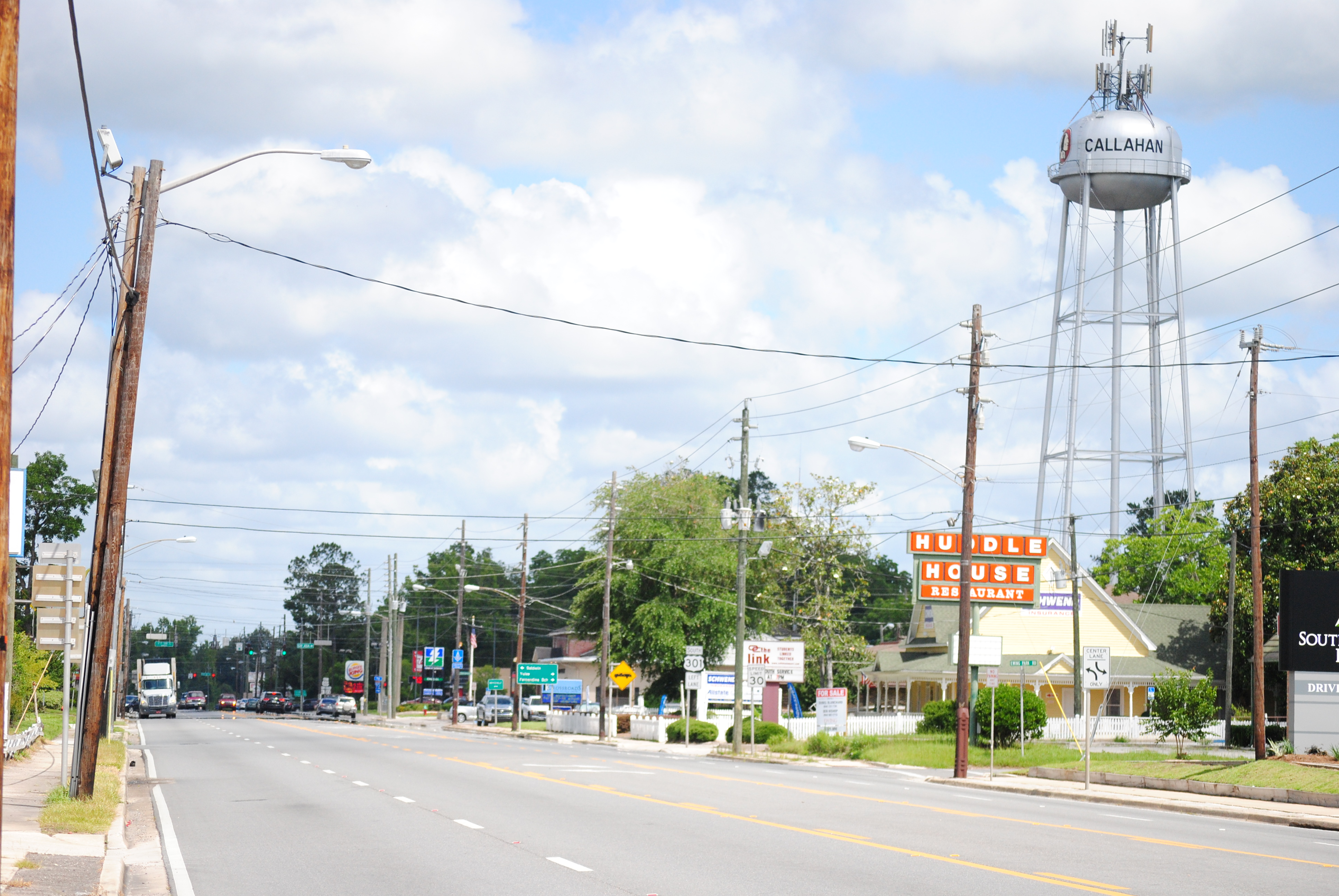
- Downtown Callahan

- Seal
- Motto: "Cross Roads to the Future"
- Location in Nassau County and the state of Florida
- Coordinates: 30°33′56″N 81°49′55″W
- Country: United States
- State: Florida
- County: Nassau
- Settled: 1856
- Incorporated: 1911

Government
  - Type: Commission-Manager
  - Mayor: Randy Knagge
  - Council President: Janet Shaw
  - Commissioners: Ashton Bishop-Vargas, Jacquelyn Fleming, and Wendi Williams
  - Town Manager: Michael "Mike" Williams
  - Town Clerk: Shawna Gugliuzza

Area
  - Total: 1.81 sq mi (4.69 km^{2})
  - Land: 1.81 sq mi (4.69 km^{2})
  - Water: 0 sq mi (0.00 km^{2})
- Elevation: 16 ft (4.9 m)

Population (2020)
  - Total: 1,526
  - Density: 843.6/sq mi (325.72/km^{2})
- Time zone: UTC-5 (Eastern (EST))
  - Summer (DST): UTC-4 (EDT)
- ZIP code: 32011
- Area code(s): 904, 324
- FIPS code: 12-09700
- GNIS feature ID: 2405365
- Website: www.townofcallahan-fl.gov

Callahan is a town in Nassau County, Florida, United States, adjacent to Duval County. The population was 1,972 at the 2020 census, up from 1,123 at the 2010 census. It is part of the Jacksonville metropolitan area. It is one location of the Northeast Florida Fair.

== History ==
The Battle of Alligator Bridge took place around Callahan on June 30, 1778, and was the only major engagement in an unsuccessful campaign to conquer British East Florida during the American Revolutionary War. The Town of Callahan was settled in 1856, but officially incorporated as a municipality in 1911.

== Geography ==
According to the United States Census Bureau, the town has a total area of 1.3 square miles (3.4 km^{2}), all land.

== Climate ==
The climate in this area is characterized by hot, humid summers and generally mild winters. According to the Köppen climate classification, the Town of Callahan has a humid subtropical climate zone (Cfa).

== Demographics ==
Historical population
| Census | Pop. | Note | %± |
|---|---|---|---|
| 1920 | 511 | | — |
| 1930 | 637 | | 24.7% |
| 1940 | 685 | | 7.5% |
| 1950 | 722 | | 5.4% |
| 1960 | 782 | | 8.3% |
| 1970 | 772 | | −1.3% |
| 1980 | 869 | | 12.6% |
| 1990 | 946 | | 8.9% |
| 2000 | 962 | | 1.7% |
| 2010 | 1,123 | | 16.7% |
| 2020 | 1,526 | | 35.9% |
U.S. Decennial Census

=== Racial and ethnic composition ===
Callahan racial composition (Hispanics excluded from racial categories) (NH = Non-Hispanic)
| Race | Pop 2010 | Pop 2020 | % 2010 | % 2020 |
|---|---|---|---|---|
| White (NH) | 994 | 1,262 | 88.51% | 82.70% |
| Black or African American (NH) | 79 | 110 | 7.03% | 7.21% |
| Native American or Alaska Native (NH) | 1 | 2 | 0.09% | 0.13% |
| Asian (NH) | 10 | 14 | 0.89% | 0.92% |
| Pacific Islander or Native Hawaiian (NH) | 0 | 1 | 0.00% | 0.07% |
| Some other race (NH) | 2 | 2 | 0.18% | 0.13% |
| Two or more races/Multiracial (NH) | 10 | 74 | 0.89% | 4.85% |
| Hispanic or Latino (any race) | 27 | 61 | 2.40% | 4.00% |
| Total | 1,123 | 1,526 | | |

=== 2020 census ===
As of the 2020 census, Callahan had a population of 1,526. The median age was 34.4 years. 29.2% of residents were under the age of 18 and 14.0% of residents were 65 years of age or older. For every 100 females there were 91.2 males, and for every 100 females age 18 and over there were 81.4 males age 18 and over.

0.0% of residents lived in urban areas, while 100.0% lived in rural areas.

There were 615 households in Callahan, of which 45.9% had children under the age of 18 living in them. Of all households, 39.7% were married-couple households, 16.7% were households with a male householder and no spouse or partner present, and 34.3% were households with a female householder and no spouse or partner present. About 26.6% of all households were made up of individuals and 14.0% had someone living alone who was 65 years of age or older. There were 652 housing units, of which 5.7% were vacant. The homeowner vacancy rate was 0.6% and the rental vacancy rate was 4.1%.

According to the 2020 American Community Survey (ACS) 5-year estimates, there were 396 families residing in the town.

=== 2010 census ===
According to the 2010 ACS 5-year estimates, there were 382 households and 223 families residing in the town.

=== 2000 census ===
At the 2000 census there were 962 people, 411 households, and 256 families living in the town. The population density was 724.9 inhabitants per square mile (279.9/km^{2}). There were 444 housing units at an average density of 334.6 per square mile (129.2/km^{2}). The racial makeup of the town was 85.86% White, 10.60% African American, 0.83% Native American, 0.21% Asian, 0.52% from other races, and 1.98% from two or more races. Hispanic or Latino of any race were 2.49%.

Of the 411 households in 2000, 33.6% had children under the age of 18 living with them, 37.0% were married couples living together, 20.7% had a female householder with no husband present, and 37.5% were non-families. 32.6% of households were one person and 16.3% were one person aged 65 or older. The average household size was 2.34 and the average family size was 2.95.

In 2000, the age distribution was 28.4% under the age of 18, 12.4% from 18 to 24, 25.5% from 25 to 44, 20.9% from 45 to 64, and 12.9% 65 or older. The median age was 33 years. For every 100 females there were 78.5 males. For every 100 females age 18 and over, there were 74.9 males.

In 2000, the median household income was $25,234 and the median family income was $32,167. Males had a median income of $27,422 versus $23,036 for females. The per capita income for the town was $14,710. About 14.8% of families and 21.9% of the population were below the poverty line, including 30.6% of those under age 18 and 18.7% of those age 65 or over.

== Education ==
The Nassau County School District serves the public schools within the Town of Callahan.

Public schools:

- Callahan Elementary School and Callahan Intermediate School serve grades K–5
- Callahan Middle School serves 6–8
- West Nassau High School serves grades 9–12

Private school:

- SonShine Christian Academy, a co-ed private school affiliated with the Assembly of God, instructs Pre-Kindergarten through 12th grade

=== Library ===
Nassau County Public Library operates the Callahan Branch Library.

== Infrastructure ==
=== Transportation ===
==== Roads ====
Callahan lies at the intersection of US 1, which is also part of US 23 as well as US 301, the northern terminus of Florida State Road A1A and Florida State Road 200. US Routes 1 and 23 run together northbound in an overlap from the Grand Park section of Northwest Jacksonville through the St. Mary's River. US 301 joins US 1 and 23 from an overlap with hidden State Road 200, that begins as far south as Ocala. SR 200 itself joins a wrong way concurrency with SR A1A into Fernandina Beach. Florida State Road 115 runs from the Deercreek section of Southeast Jacksonville and terminates with US 1 and 23 south of downtown, but contains a de facto extension at the northern edges of town in the form of CR 115 on Kings Road and Old Dixie Highway. CR 108 is known as North Brandies Avenue then becomes Saint George Road as it loops around western Nassau County then curves to the east while passing through Hillard where it runs through another intersection with US 1, 23 and 301. The road continues east through northern rural Nassau County briefly passing through Evergreen, and finally terminates at US 17 north of Becker.

- US 1 / US 23 (New Kings Road)
- US 301 (First Avenue)
- SR A1A (First Avenue)
- SR 115 (Lem Turner Road)
- SR 200 (First Avenue)
- CR 108 (Saint George Road /North Brandies Avenue)
- CR 115 (Kings Road)

==== Railroads ====
Two railroad lines exist within Callahan; The CSX Nahunta Subdivision, a former Atlantic Coast Line Railroad line which runs from the Jacksonville Terminal Subdivision in Jacksonville to the Savannah Subdivision in Savannah, Georgia, and the CSX Callahan Subdivision. a former Seaboard Air Line Railroad line which runs south to a junction in Baldwin that includes the Wildwood Subdivision the former Tallahassee Subdivision and another leg of the Jacksonville Terminal Subdivision. Two former SAL lines that extended from the Callahan Subdivision were an abandoned segment of the Fernandina Subdivision and the Gross Cutoff.

=== Air transport ===
The Hilliard Airpark is a small, unpaved airstrip available for personal aircraft. This is a municipal facility, and has hangars available for those who want them. The Airpark can also be used as a landing site for helicopters to transport patients in urgent situations. The complex is located on Eastwood Road, across the street from Eastwood Oaks Apartments.

=== Fire department ===
Nassau County Fire Rescue operates Station 50 in Callahan.

== Notable people ==
- George C. Coleman, state legislator
- Howie Kendrick, former MLB baseball player for the Anaheim Angels, Los Angeles Dodgers and Washington Nationals
- Frank Murphy, former NFL American football player for the Chicago Bears, Tampa Bay Buccaneers and Houston Texans
