= Yulee High School =

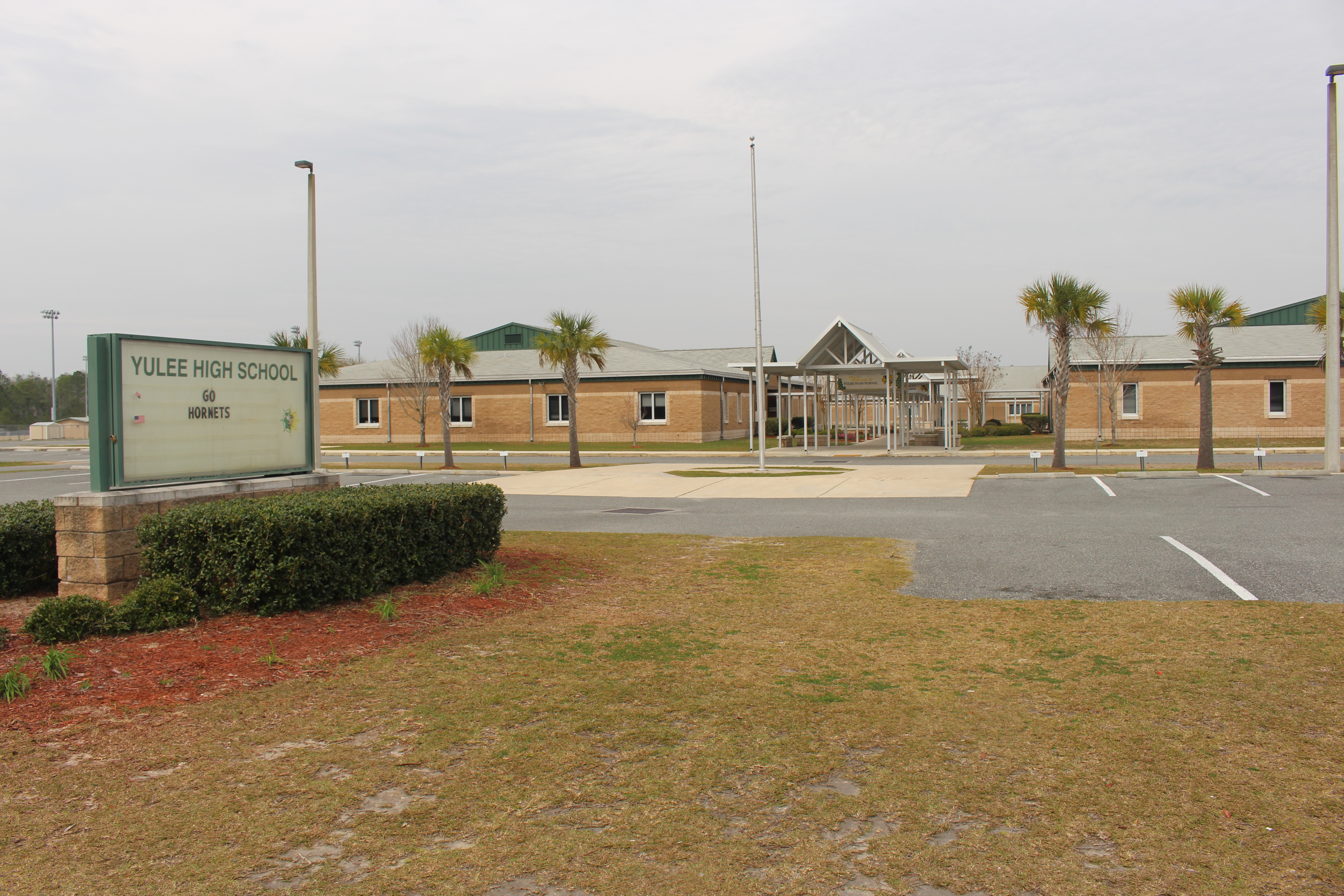

Location
- 85375 Miner Road; Yulee, Florida 32097–7253; United States; 30°36′36″N 81°34′48″W

Information
- Type: Public high school
- School district: Nassau County School District
- NCES District ID: 1201350
- CEEB code: 102060
- NCES School ID: 120135004995
- Dean: LaTroy Strong
- Principal: Charles Alvare'
- Principal: Donna Jackson
- Principal: Rachel Norfleet
- Teaching staff: 78.50 (on an FTE basis)
- Grades: 9–12
- Enrollment: 1,431 (2023–24)
- Student to teacher ratio: 18.23
- Colors: Green & Gold
- Fight song: Hornet Victory March (Arrangement of University of Notre Dame Fight Song)
- Sports: Band, Baseball, Basketball, Bowling, Cheerleading, Cross Country, Flag Football, Football, Soccer, Softball, Swimming, Tennis, Track and Field, Volleyball, Weightlifting, and Wrestling
- Mascot: Hornet
- Newspaper: Stinger
- Yearbook: The Vespidae
- Website: Yulee High School Home Page

Yulee High School is a four-year school located in Yulee, Florida. The original school closed in 1965 when Florida desegregated public schools. Following desegregation, students were allowed to choose between attending West Nassau or Fernandina Beach. The current institution opened in 2006, although Yulee had been the site of a high school earlier, from the 1930s to the 1960s. The initial graduating class of Yulee High School, in 2007, had a 71% graduation rate, 23% of whom graduated with honors.

The mascot of the sports teams for YHS is the Hornet. Yulee high school is also in a “A” rated district in Nassau county.

== Discrimination ==
Yulee High School is located inside the Nassau County School District which has had controversies involving racial discrimination against both faculty and students, sex, and other social issues. Republican superintendent Kathy Burns denied the claims of systemic racism in the law suit Joinville v. Nassau County School Board.

Civil rights groups and auditors also say that the school has systemic problems with opportunities and discipline regarding minorities. An audit from the state of Florida also shows that Black students with disabilities are more than 2 times more likely to get disciplined.

== Notable alumni ==
- Derrick Henry – NFL running back for the Baltimore Ravens and 2015 Heisman Trophy winner.
- Yan Diomande – Winger for Real Madrid
