= Nassau County Courthouse =

Nassau County Courthouse, Old Nassau County Courthouse, or other variants thereof may refer to the following:

- Nassau County Courthouse (Florida)
- Old Nassau County Courthouse (New York)
