= Bobby Ramsay =

American football coach

Bobby Ramsay is a High school football head coach in the state of Florida.

== Life and career ==
Ramsay has 2 FHSAA championships in his career. He was the head coach of the Mandarin High School Men's Football team, but in 2021 his contract was ended. a former McMurry University football player and Graduate assistant at Trinity University. There, he has won one state championship and has been there since mid-2017. He formerly was the Men's Football coach for Yulee High School. There, he coached Heisman Trophy winner Derrick Henry to break many records at Running back and to the 2013 U.S. Army All-American Bowl. He was named the 2018 Florida Dairy Farmers Football Coach-of-the-Year.
