= Hilliard, Florida =

Town in the state of Florida, United States

- Town
- Town of Hilliard
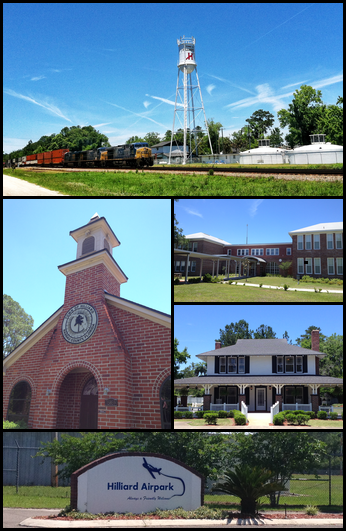
- Top, left to right: Railroad and Water Tower, Town Hall, Hilliard Middle-Senior High School, Hilliard Mansion, Hilliard Airpark

- Seal
- Motto: "Aviation to Timber...A Community for Families"
- Location in Nassau County and the state of Florida
- Coordinates: 30°41′12″N 81°55′16″W
- Country: United States
- State: Florida
- County: Nassau
- Settled: 1881
- Incorporated: 1947

Government
  - Type: Mayor–Commission
  - Mayor: John P. Beasley
  - Council President: Kenneth "Kenny" A. Sims
  - Commissioners: Jared Wollitz, Dallis Hunter, Joseph "Joe" Michaels, and Council Presidnt Pro Tem Lee Pickett
  - Town Clerk: Lisa Purvis
  - Town Attorney: Christian W. Waugh

Area
  - Total: 5.51 sq mi (14.26 km^{2})
  - Land: 5.51 sq mi (14.26 km^{2})
  - Water: 0 sq mi (0.00 km^{2})
- Elevation: 66 ft (20 m)

Population (2020)
  - Total: 2,967
  - Density: 538.7/sq mi (208.01/km^{2})
- Time zone: UTC-5 (Eastern (EST))
  - Summer (DST): UTC-4 (EDT)
- ZIP code: 32046
- Area codes: 904, 324
- FIPS code: 12-30750
- GNIS feature ID: 2405837
- Website: www.townofhilliard.com

Hilliard is a town in Nassau County, Florida, United States; northwest of Jacksonville. It is part of the Jacksonville, Florida Metropolitan Statistical Area. As of the 2020 census, the population was 2,967, down from 3,086 at the 2010 census.

Hilliard was named "2003 Rural Community of the Year" by former Florida governor Jeb Bush, for its collaboration with the YMCA to establish a local chapter, which included a swimming pool and exercise facility.

== Geography ==
Hilliard is near the Florida-Georgia border, and within the Jacksonville metropolitan area.

According to the United States Census Bureau, the town has a total area of 5.5 square miles (14 km^{2}), all land.

== Climate ==
The climate in this area is characterized by hot, humid summers and generally mild to cool winters. According to the Köppen Climate Classification system, Hilliard has a humid subtropical climate zone, abbreviated "Cfa" on climate maps.

== Demographics ==
Historical population
Census	Pop.	Note	%±
1950	607		—
1960	1,075		77.1%
1970	1,205		12.1%
1980	1,869		55.1%
1990	1,751		−6.3%
2000	2,702		54.3%
2010	3,086		14.2%
2020	2,967		−3.9%
U.S. Decennial Census

=== Racial and ethnic composition ===
Hilliard racial composition (Hispanics excluded from racial categories) (NH = Non-Hispanic)
Race	Pop 2010	Pop 2020	% 2010	% 2020
White (NH)	2,717	2,457	88.04%	82.81%
Black or African American (NH)	266	251	8.62%	8.46%
Native American or Alaska Native (NH)	12	14	0.39%	0.47%
Asian (NH)	11	16	0.36%	0.54%
Pacific Islander or Native Hawaiian (NH)	1	3	0.03%	0.10%
Some other race (NH)	4	4	0.13%	0.13%
Two or more races/Multiracial (NH)	31	137	1.00%	4.62%
Hispanic or Latino (any race)	44	85	1.43%	2.86%
Total	3,086	2,967		

=== 2020 census ===
As of the 2020 census, Hilliard had a population of 2,967. The median age was 35.6 years. 26.7% of residents were under the age of 18 and 16.4% of residents were 65 years of age or older. For every 100 females there were 89.2 males, and for every 100 females age 18 and over there were 84.9 males age 18 and over.

As of 2020, 0.0% of residents lived in urban areas, while 100.0% lived in rural areas.

In 2020, there were 1,100 households in Hilliard, of which 37.5% had children under the age of 18 living in them. Of all households, 43.4% were married-couple households, 18.5% were households with a male householder and no spouse or partner present, and 30.1% were households with a female householder and no spouse or partner present. About 25.4% of all households were made up of individuals and 10.5% had someone living alone who was 65 years of age or older.

In 2020, there were 1,195 housing units, of which 7.9% were vacant. The homeowner vacancy rate was 3.4% and the rental vacancy rate was 5.8%.

According to the 2020 American Community Survey 5-year estimates, there were 883 families residing in the town.

=== 2010 census ===
As of the 2010 United States census, there were 3,086 people, 1,016 households, and 739 families residing in the town.

=== 2000 census ===
As of the census of 2000, there were 2,702 people, 966 households, and 705 families residing in the town. The population density was 491.7 inhabitants per square mile (189.8/km^{2}). There were 1,066 housing units at an average density of 194.0 per square mile (74.9/km^{2}). The racial makeup of the town was 84.09% White, 13.10% African American, 0.70% Native American, 0.48% Asian, and 1.63% from two or more races. Hispanic or Latino residents of any race were 1.00% of the population.

In 2000, there were 966 households, out of which 40.7% had children under the age of 18 living with them, 49.8% were married couples living together, 18.5% had a female householder with no husband present, and 27.0% were non-families. 24.5% of all households were made up of individuals, and 9.9% had someone living alone who was 65 years of age or older. The average household size was 2.68 and the average family size was 3.17.

In 2000, in the town, 30.4% of the population was under the age of 18, 8.8% was from 18 to 24, 27.9% from 25 to 44, 20.4% from 45 to 64, and 12.5% was 65 years of age or older. The median age was 33 years. For every 100 females, there were 87.0 males. For every 100 females age 18 and over, there were 82.6 males.

In 2000, the median income for a household in the town was $34,531, and the median income for a family was $37,227. Males had a median income of $34,554 versus $23,713 for females. The per capita income for the town was $14,683. About 11.0% of families and 11.7% of the population were below the poverty line, including 10.2% of those under age 18 and 18.6% of those age 65 or over.

== Economy ==
Along with Callahan, Hilliard is one of the major economic centers of western Nassau County. Its location on the railroad and at the intersection of several major roads (US 1 and County Road 108) have contributed significantly to economic growth. The area has significant stands of lumber used in the manufacture of paper as well as wood products. Much of the area land for tree farming is owned by either Rayonier or The Moyer Company.

Hilliard is home to a Federal Aviation Administration (FAA) Air Traffic Control Center, which coordinates most commercial and civilian air traffic for the southeastern United States. The FAA center is a major employer in Hilliard.

Hilliard is one of many towns along US 1 that saw its tourism trade dwindle when I-95 was opened. Logging is a major industry in the area surrounding Hilliard.

Because of specific soil conditions and a great deal of open rural land in the area, Hilliard was at one time considered by the Department of Energy as a possible site for the Superconducting Super Collider; however, that never materialized.

== Arts and culture ==
Nassau County Public Library operates the Hilliard Branch Library, opened in the 1970s.

== Government ==
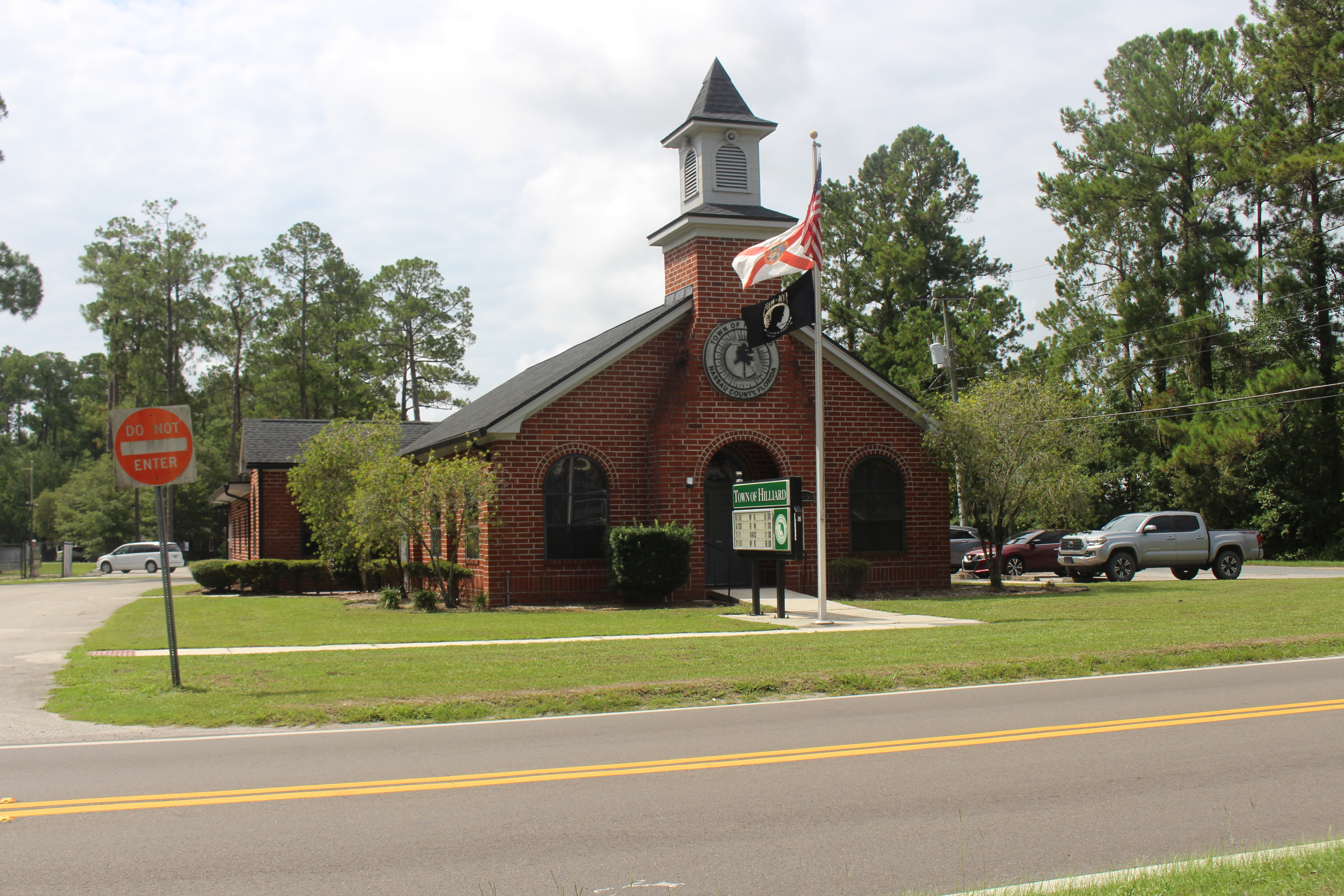
Hilliard Town Hall

Hilliard has a Mayor–Commission form of government.

As of 2026, the Mayor is John P. Beasley, and the Town Clerk is Lisa Purvis.

== Education ==
As of 2000, there are 680 residents, or 25.1% of the total population, who are enrolled in some type of school. 7.9% of those school-age individuals are in nursery or pre-school, 9.0% attend kindergarten, 44.6 are in elementary school (grades 1–8), 30.4% are in high school (9–12), and 8.1% are enrolled in college or graduate school.

In 2000, Hilliard has 1,651 residents who are 25 years and older. 8.8% have less than a 9th grade education, and 23.9% have between a 9th and 12th grade education, but no diploma. 38.3% have a high school diploma or GED, 18.8% have some college but no degree, 4.3% have an Associate's degree, 3.8% have a Bachelor's degree, and 2.0% have a Master's degree or higher.

=== Educational institutions ===
It is a part of the Nassau County School District. Hilliard Elementary School serves grades K–5, and Hilliard Middle-Senior High School is a consolidated institution which holds grades 6–12.

== Infrastructure ==
=== Transportation ===
==== Area roads ====
Hilliard lies at the intersection of County Road 108 (CR 108) and New Kings Road (US 1), which is also part of US 301 and US 23 as it runs south from the St. Mary's River to Callahan. CR 108 is known as Second Street while passing through Hilliard; at this intersection is the only complete set of traffic signals in the town. There is also a blinking yellow light approximately two miles south, at the intersection of Old Dixie Highway (CR 115) and US 1.

- US 1 / US 23 / US 301 (New Kings Road)
- CR 108 (Second Street)
- CR 115 (Old Dixie Highway)
- CR 115A (Kings Ferry Road)

==== Railroads ====
The sole railroad line within Hilliard is the CSX Nahunta Subdivision, a former Atlantic Coast Line Railroad line which runs from the Jacksonville Terminal Subdivision in Jacksonville to the Savannah Subdivision in Savannah, Georgia.

==== Air transport ====
The Hilliard Airpark is a small, unpaved airstrip available for personal aircraft. This is a municipal facility, and has hangars available for those who want them. The airpark can also be used as a landing site for helicopters to transport patients in urgent situations. The complex is located on Eastwood Road, across the street from Eastwood Oaks Apartments.

=== Fire department ===
Nassau County Fire Rescue operates Station 40 in Hilliard, as well as Station 90 River Road.

== Notable people ==
- Mike Alessi, professional Motocross and Supercross racer
- Howie Kendrick, Major League Baseball baseball player for the Anaheim Angels
- Daniel Thomas, National Football League American football player for the Miami Dolphins
