= George C. Coleman =

American politician

George C. Coleman (1851-1926) was an American state legislator from Florida. He represented Nassau County, Florida in the Florida House of Representatives in 1881.

His post office was in Callahan, Florida. In 1889, the Indianapolis Journal reported that he had to flee his home at night for safety from enraged Democrats. He was described as "Colored".

== See also ==
- African American officeholders from the end of the Civil War until before 1900
