= United States Post Office, Custom House, and Courthouse (Fernandina, Florida) =

Historic building in Florida, US

Coordinates: 30.6714°N 81.4619°W

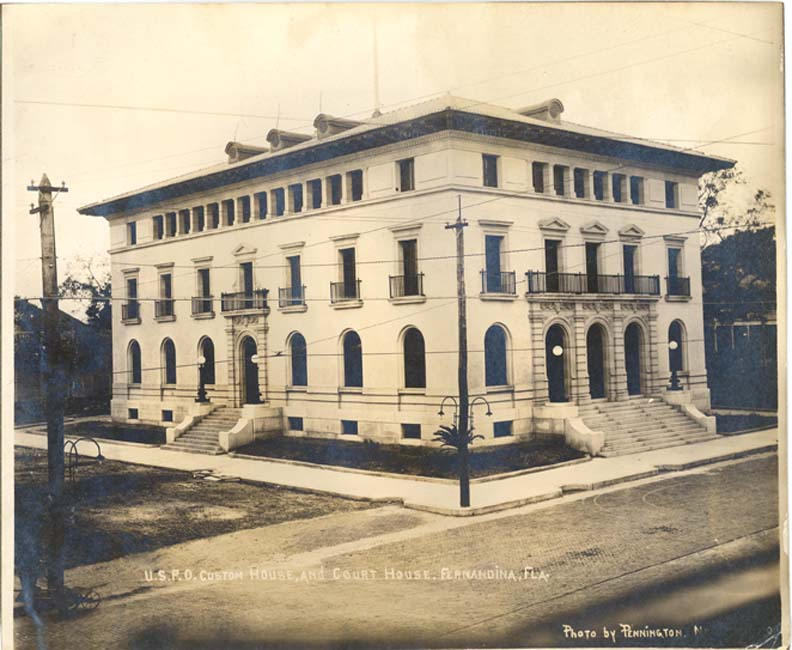
U.S. Post Office, Custom House, and Courthouse (n.d., ca. 1912) Completed in 1912

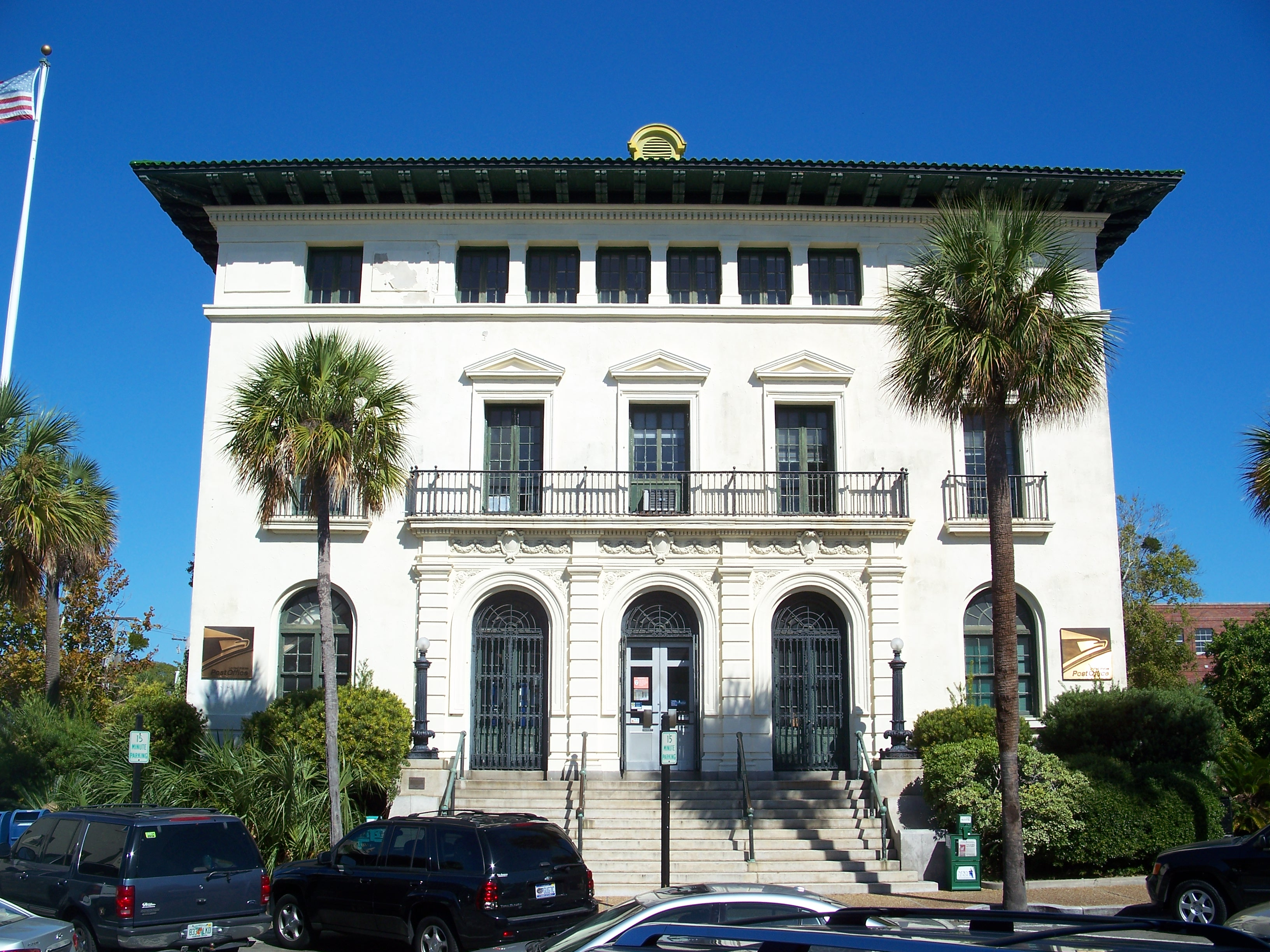
The post office in 2011

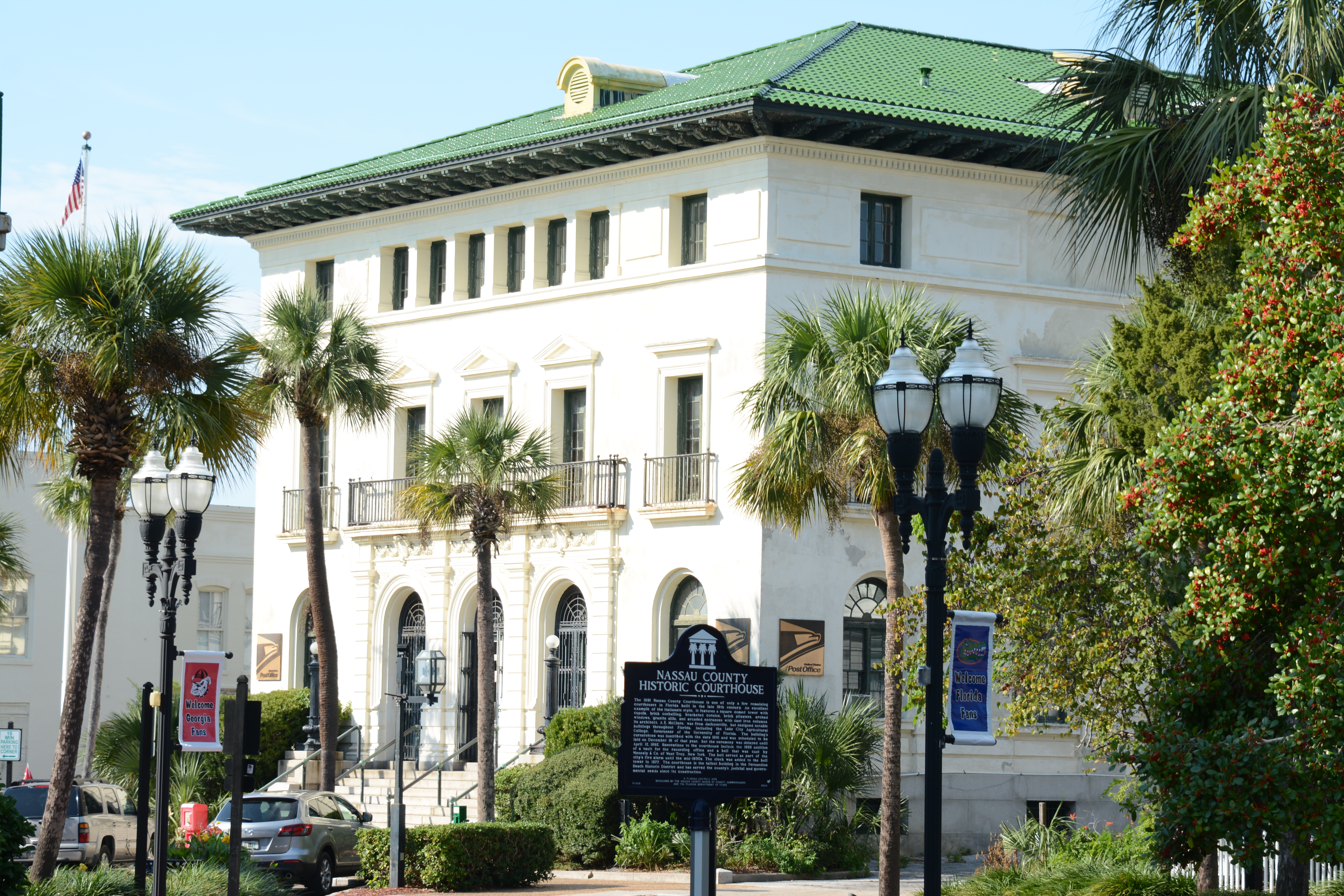
The post office in 2015

The United States Post Office, Custom House, and Courthouse is an historic building of the United States government in Fernandina Beach, Florida. It was constructed in the locally popular Renaissance Revival architecture style, and was completed in 1912 under the supervision of James Knox Taylor, Supervising Architect of the United States Treasury Department. The building sits at the intersection of 4th and Centre Streets, across from another historic Court House (c. 1898), and adjacent to the pre-Civil War Victorian Lesesne House (c. 1859). It is three stories, comprising 18,800 square feet (1,750 m^{2}), including a basement and a partial attic.

The United States District Court for the Southern District of Florida met here until the creation of the Middle District in 1962, at which time the building entered use by the Middle District of Florida beginning in 1962. The facility was also in use as a post office during that entire period. Other federal offices vacated the building in the 1930s–1940s, with the post office remaining only on the first floor. Some second and third floor space was used commercially into the 1990s, but the condition of the structure and lack of elevators ultimately led to the end of those uses.

In 1989, the building was listed in A Guide to Florida's Historic Architecture, published by the University of Florida Press.
