= Isle of Eight Flags Shrimp Festival =

Annual festival held in Fernandina Beach, Florida

Coordinates: 30°40′15.9″N 81°27′52.8″W

The Isle of Eight Flags Shrimp Festival is an annual festival held in Fernandina Beach, Florida. The first festival, which was originally referred to as the Shrimp Boat Festival, was held in 1964. The festival is normally held over the first weekend in May. Events and activities of the festival include cooking and selling shrimp and seafood, display and sale of arts, crafts, collectibles, and antiques, live music, the Miss Shrimp Festival pageant, a fireworks display, and a parade.

The 2013 edition of the festival marked the 50th anniversary, and was celebrated as the "Year of the Golden Shrimp". In 2020-21, the festival went on hiatus caused by COVID-19 pandemic. 2022 saw its resumption.
