= Hilliard Middle-Senior High School =

Coordinates: 30.6878°N 81.9269°W

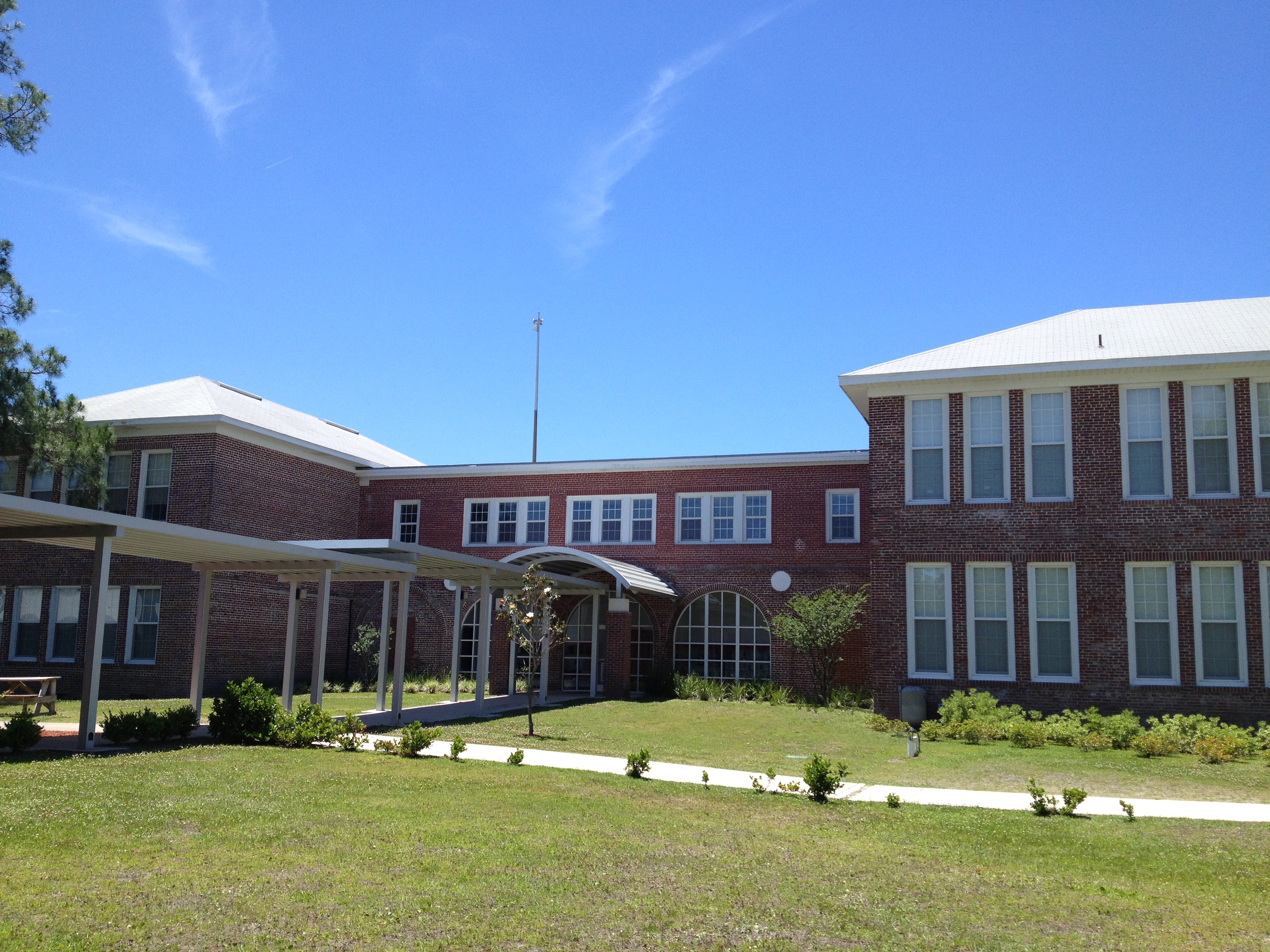

Location
- 1 Flashes Avenue; Hilliard, Florida 32046–3700; United States

Information
- Type: Public
- School district: Nassau County School District
- NCES District ID: 1201350
- CEEB code: 100675
- NCES School ID: 120135001315
- Principal: John Crawford
- Teaching staff: 40.83 (on an FTE basis)
- Grades: 6–12
- Enrollment: 783 (2023–2024)
- Student to teacher ratio: 19.18
- Colors: Red and white
- Mascot: Red Flashes
- Website: High School Home Page

Hilliard Middle-Senior High School is a public combined middle-senior high school located in Hilliard, Florida, United States. It is part of the Nassau County School District and serves grades 6 through 12. For athletics, the school's nickname and mascot is the Hilliard Flashes, named after the Town of Hilliard's previous status as the statistical lightning capital of Florida.

== Notable alumni ==
- Daniel Thomas, National Football League player for the Miami Dolphins
