= Frank Murphy (gridiron football) =

American football player (born 1977)

No. 87, 83, 15, 82
- Position: Wide receiver

Personal information
- Born: February 11, 1977 (age 49); Jacksonville, Florida, U.S.
- Listed height: 6 ft 0 in (1.83 m)
- Listed weight: 217 lb (98 kg)

Career information
- High school: West Nassau (Callahan, Florida)
- College: Kansas State
- NFL draft: 2000: 6th round, 170th overall pick

Career history
- Chicago Bears (2000)*; Tampa Bay Buccaneers (2000–2002); Houston Texans (2002); Tampa Bay Buccaneers (2004); Miami Dolphins (2006)*; Toronto Argonauts (2007); Hamilton Tiger-Cats (2007)*; Toronto Argonauts (2009)*; Florida Tuskers (2009); Tampa Bay Storm (2011)*
- * Offseason or practice squad member only

Awards and highlights
- First-team NJCAA All-American (1997); First-team All-KJCCC (1997); KJCCC Offensive P.O.Y. (1997)

Career NFL statistics
- Receptions: 8
- Receiving yards: 71
- Receiving touchdowns: 1
- Return yards: 677
- Stats at Pro Football Reference

Career CFL statistics
- Receptions: 37
- Receiving yards: 614
- Receiving touchdowns: 2
- Stats at CFL.ca (archived)

Frank Murphy (born February 11, 1977) is an American former professional football player who was a wide receiver in the National Football League (NFL) and Canadian Football League (CFL). He was selected by the Chicago Bears in the sixth round of the 2000 NFL draft. He played college football for the Kansas State Wildcats.

Murphy was also a member of the Tampa Bay Buccaneers, Houston Texans, Miami Dolphins, Toronto Argonauts, Hamilton Tiger-Cats, Florida Tuskers, and Tampa Bay Storm.

== Early life ==
Murphy was an All-American, All-State and Nassau County Player of the Year as a senior running back and return specialist at West Nassau High School in Callahan, Florida.

== College career ==
In 1995, Murphy played wide receiver for Itawamba Community College. He transferred to Garden City Community College in 1996 and sat out the season as a transfer. In 1997, he was named to the National Junior College Athletic Association All-American first-team and National Player of the Year.

Transferring to Kansas State University in 1998, he appeared in the Wildcats' final eight games as a reserve tailback, recording 257 yards and five touchdowns on 55 carries, three catches for 91 yards and a touchdown, and returned eight kickoffs for 210 yards. In 1999, he finished second on the Wildcats with 541 yards and six touchdowns on 97 carries primarily as a backup running back, caught six passes for 39 yards, and 199 yards on seven kickoff returns.

== Professional career ==
=== Chicago Bears ===
Murphy was selected in the sixth round of the 2000 NFL draft by the Chicago Bears and released by Chicago in August.

=== Tampa Bay Buccaneers (first stint) ===
Murphy subsequently signed to the practice squad with the Tampa Bay Buccaneers and made his NFL debut on December 3, 2000 returning two kickoffs for 24 yards against the Dallas Cowboys. In 2001, he dressed in 11 games for Tampa Bay with 8 catches for 71 yards and 1 touchdown and he led the Buccaneers with 20 kick returns for 445 yards and recorded two defensive tackles.

In the first pre-season game of the 2002 NFL season on August 12, Murphy returned the opening kickoff against the Miami Dolphins for a 95-yard touchdown. It was the very first play in live action for the reign of Jon Gruden as the Buccaneers' Head Coach. Despite this, Murphy was subsequently released by Tampa Bay during final cuts.

=== Houston Texans ===
Murphy signed as a free agent with the Houston Texans on November 27, 2002, dressing in five games for the Texans and recorded 8 special teams tackles and 1 kickoff return.

Murphy was released by the Texans following training camp in 2003 and spent the rest of the year out of football.

=== Tampa Bay Buccaneers (second stint) ===
Murphy re-signed with the Buccaneers as a free agent in 2004. He played in three games with the Bucs in 2004 as a backup receiver and special teams player before suffering a season-ending injury. He was released prior to the 2005 season.

=== Miami Dolphins ===
Murphy signed with the Miami Dolphins in 2006 but was waived prior to the regular season.

=== Toronto Argonauts (first stint) ===
Murphy signed as a free agent with the Toronto Argonauts on June 10, 2007 and dressed for 16 games recording 37 catches for 614 yards and 3 touchdowns making him the Argonauts’ third-leading receiver that year.

=== Hamilton Tiger-Cats ===
Murphy was traded to the Hamilton Tiger-Cats in exchange for running back Anthony Davis on December 18, 2007.

=== Toronto Argonauts (second stint) ===
After a year out of football, Murphy re-signed with the Argonauts on April 15, 2009. He was released in June.

=== Florida Tuskers ===
Murphy was signed by the Florida Tuskers of the United Football League on September 3, 2009.

=== Tampa Bay Storm ===
Murphy was signed by the Tampa Bay Storm of the Arena Football League in February 2011.
