= Daniel Thomas (running back) =

American football player (born 1987)

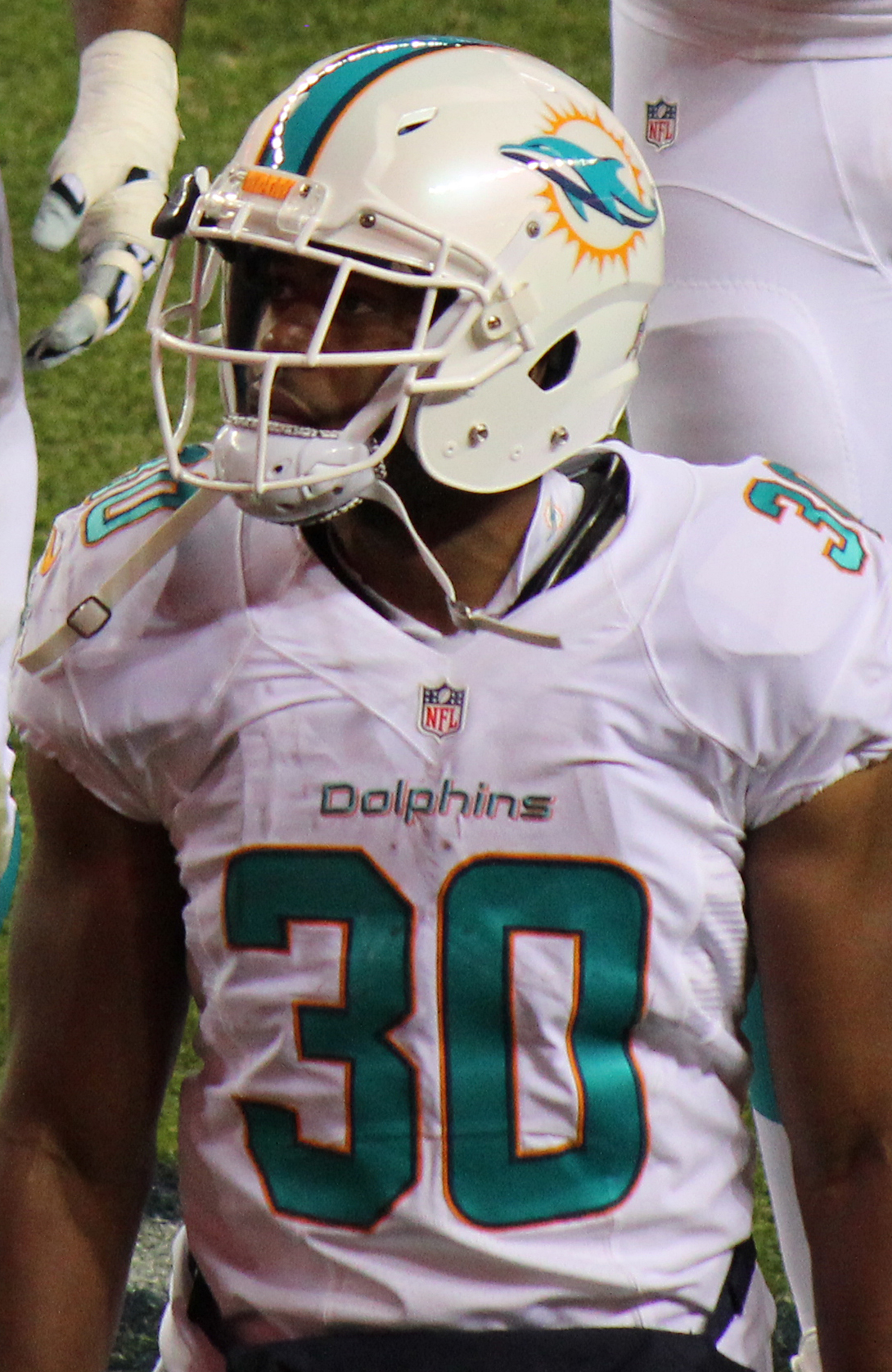
- Thomas with the Miami Dolphins in 2014

No. 33, 30
- Position: Running back

Personal information
- Born: October 29, 1987 (age 39); Hilliard, Florida, U.S.
- Listed height: 6 ft 0 in (1.83 m)
- Listed weight: 225 lb (102 kg)

Career information
- High school: Hilliard (FL)
- College: Kansas State
- NFL draft: 2011: 2nd round, 62nd overall pick

Career history
- Miami Dolphins (2011–2014); Chicago Bears (2015)*; Miami Dolphins (2016)*; Saskatchewan Roughriders (2017)*
- * Offseason or practice squad member only

Awards and highlights
- First-team All-Big 12 (2009); Second-team All-Big 12 (2010); Big 12 Offensive Newcomer of the Year (2009); JUCO All-American (2007)

Career NFL statistics
- Rushing attempts: 409
- Rushing yards: 1,480
- Rushing touchdowns: 10
- Receptions: 55
- Receiving yards: 412
- Receiving touchdowns: 3
- Stats at Pro Football Reference

Daniel Thomas (born October 29, 1987) is an American former professional football player who was a running back for the Miami Dolphins of the National Football League (NFL). He played college football for the Kansas State Wildcats. He was selected by the Dolphins in the second round of the 2011 NFL draft.

== Early life ==
Thomas rushed 103 times for 1,100 yards and 11 touchdowns at quarterback as a senior at Hilliard Middle-Senior High School in Hilliard, Florida. He threw for 936 yards and added 11 touchdowns. He also chipped in 57 tackles and one interception as a senior safety. He earned all-state honors as both a quarterback and linebacker. As a Junior, Thomas rushed for 178 yards and a touchdown and also had 34 receptions for 596 yards and four touchdowns primarily playing WR on a team that also featured Ralph Bolden who was an All-Big 10 performer at RB for Purdue in 2009. Thomas was also a stand-out basketball player in High School, earning All-Nassau county honors while averaging 17.3 points and 6.2 rebounds per game.

== College career ==
=== Junior college ===
Thomas rushed for over 500 yards and seven touchdowns as a freshman and helped lead Northwest Mississippi CC to a division championship. Thomas accounted for 618 yards and six touchdowns in 2007 on 103 carries and also threw for 450 yards and two scores. Thomas capped off his junior college career by becoming a JUCO All-American.

Unable to qualify academically for Kansas State in July 2008, Thomas spent the 2008 season at Butler County Community College and Manhattan Christian College in order to meet academic requirements.

=== Kansas State ===
Thomas came to Kansas State as a four-star prospect by Rivals.com and the number 35 junior college prospect in the nation. He was also a three-star prospect by Scout.com. He was rated as the No. 8 JUCO prospect in the state of Mississippi by the Sun Herald.

Thomas was voted the 2009 Big 12 Newcomer of the Year and was named to the All-Big 12 First-team. Thomas gave the Wildcats their third straight Offensive Newcomer of the Year award winner and league-leading fourth overall. Brandon Banks and Deon Murphy were honored in 2008 and 2007, respectively, joining K-State’s first honoree, Michael Bishop in 1997. Thomas rushed for 1,265 yards on 247 carries, averaging 5.1 yards and 11 touchdowns.

At the close of his KSU career, Thomas ranked second in school history in career rushing yards, single season rushing yards, number three in carries in a career, number four in rushing touchdowns, number two in single season rushing touchdowns, number six in single season all-purpose yards, number five in all-time all-purpose yards.

=== College statistics ===
Season	Rushing				Receiving			
Season	Att	Yds	Avg	TD	Rec	Yds	Avg	TD
2006	69	394	5.7	3	0	0	0.0	0
2007	103	562	5.5	6	0	0	0.0	0
2008	Did not play due to NCAA transfer rules							
2009	247	1,265	5.1	11	25	257	10.3	0
2010	298	1,585	5.3	19	27	171	6.3	0
Totals*	545	2,850	5.2	30	52	428	8.2	0

*FBS totals only

== Professional career ==
Pre-draft measurables
Height	Weight	Arm length	Hand span	Wingspan	40-yard dash	10-yard split	20-yard split	20-yard shuttle	Three-cone drill	Vertical jump	Broad jump	Bench press
6 ft 0 1/4 in (1.84 m)	230 lb (104 kg)	32 3/8 in (0.82 m)	9 in (0.23 m)	6 ft 5 in (1.96 m)	4.62 s	1.54 s	2.64 s	4.29 s	7.06 s	34.0 in (0.86 m)	10 ft 3 in (3.12 m)	21 reps
All values from NFL Combine/Pro Day

=== Miami Dolphins (first stint) ===
Thomas was taken with the 62nd overall pick in the second round of the 2011 NFL draft by the Miami Dolphins. On July 29, 2011, he signed a 4-year contract. Thomas found early success in the NFL, rushing for 107 yards in Week 2 and 95 yards with a receiving touchdown in Week 3. He injured his hamstring and was not able to play again until Week 6. Thomas finished the season with 165 carries for 581 yards.

The Dolphins released Thomas on August 30, 2014 for final roster cuts before the start of the 2014 season.

Thomas was re-signed on September 15, 2014, after an injury to Knowshon Moreno.

=== Chicago Bears ===
On June 18, 2015, the Chicago Bears signed Thomas to a one-year contract. He was released on August 30, 2015.

=== Miami Dolphins (second stint) ===
Thomas signed with the Dolphins on March 31, 2016. On September 3, 2016, he was released by the Dolphins as part of final roster cuts.

=== Saskatchewan Roughriders ===
Thomas signed with the Saskatchewan Roughriders in January 2017. He was released on June 1, 2017
