= Nassau County School District =

School district in Florida, United States

Address
- 1201 Atlantic Avenue Fernandina Beach, Florida, 32034; United States

District information
- Type: Public
- Grades: PreK–12
- NCES District ID: 1201350

Students and staff
- Students: 11,898
- Teachers: 761.13
- Staff: 814.8
- Student–teacher ratio: 15.63

Other information
- Website: www.nassau.k12.fl.us

Nassau County School District (NCSD) is a school district headquartered in Fernandina Beach, Florida. It serves all of Nassau County. The district serves five geographic areas: Fernandina, Bryceville, Callahan, Hilliard, and Yulee.

== Schools ==
=== Elementary schools ===
- Callahan Elementary School (K–2)
- Southside Elementary School (K–2)
- Yulee Primary School (K–2)
- Bryceville Elementary School (K–5)
- Hilliard Elementary School (K–5)
- Wildlight Elementary School (K–5)
- Callahan Intermediate School (3–5)
- Emma Love Hardee Elementary School (3–5)
- Yulee Elementary School (3–5)

=== Middle and high schools ===
- Callahan Middle School (6–8)
- Fernandina Beach Middle School (6–8)
- Yulee Middle School (6–8)
- Hilliard Middle-Senior High School (6–12)
- Fernandina Beach High School (9–12)
- West Nassau County High School (9–12)
- Yulee High School (9–12)

=== Alternative schools ===
- Nassau Adult High School
- Nassau Virtual School
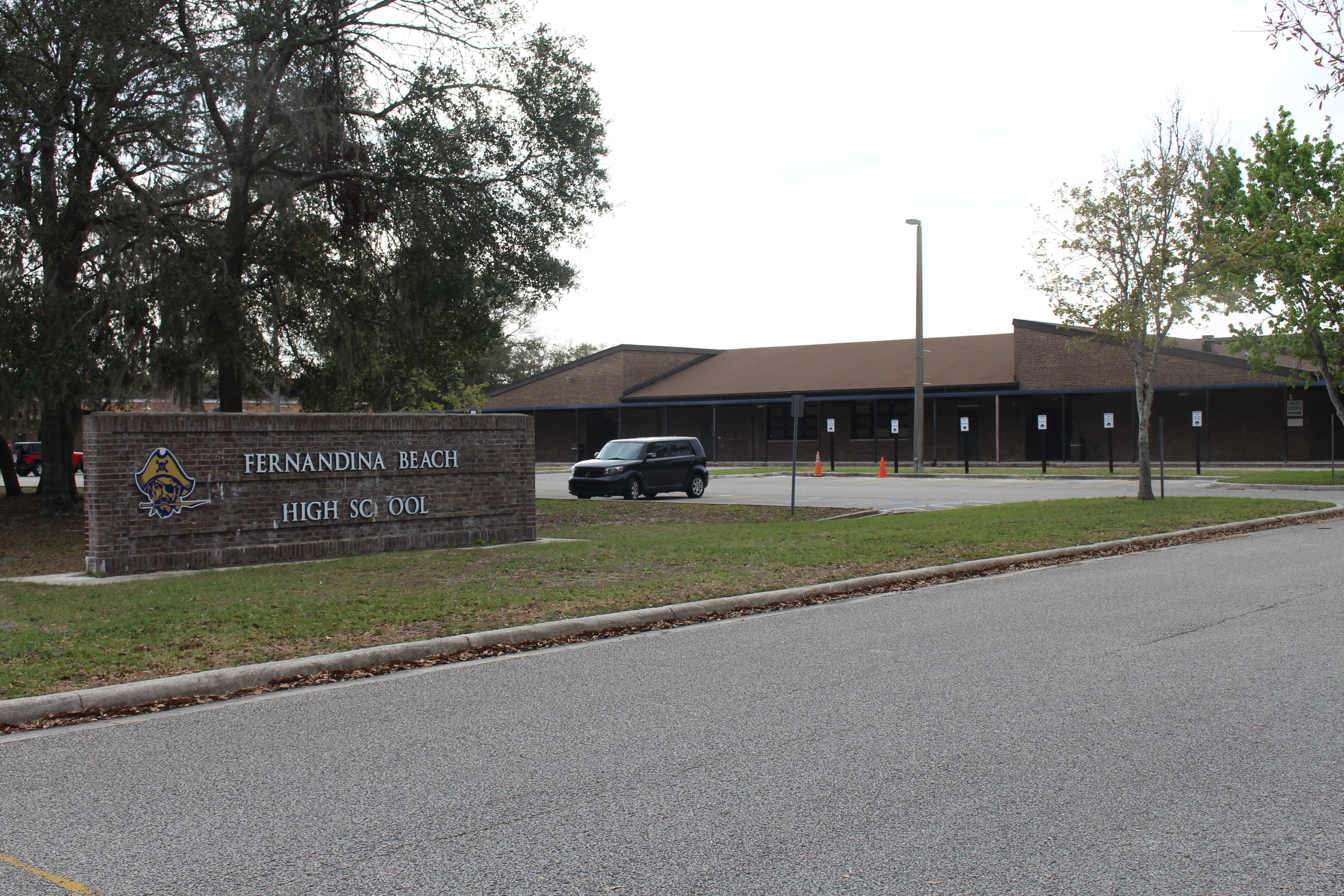
Fernandina Beach High School

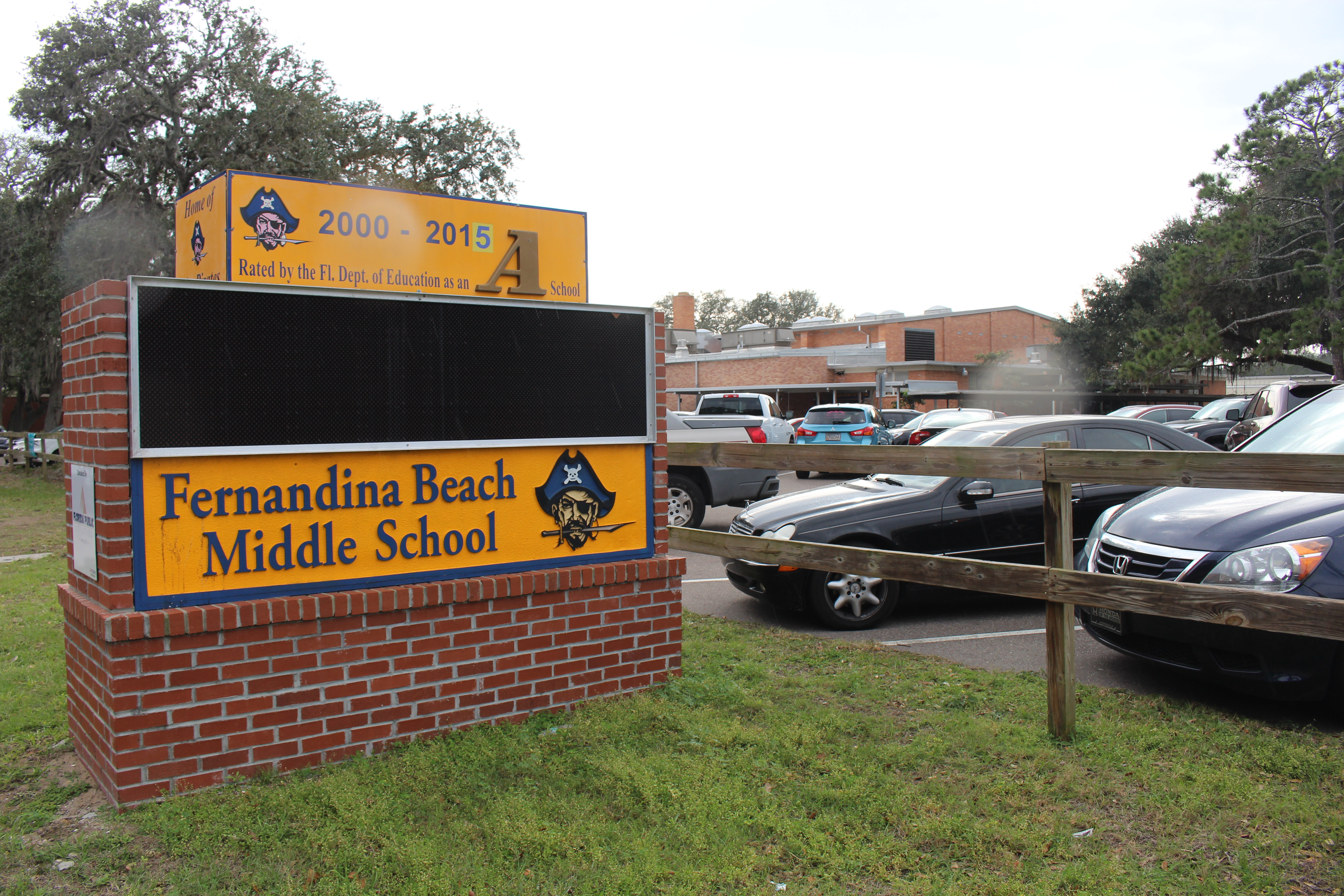
Fernandina Beach Middle School

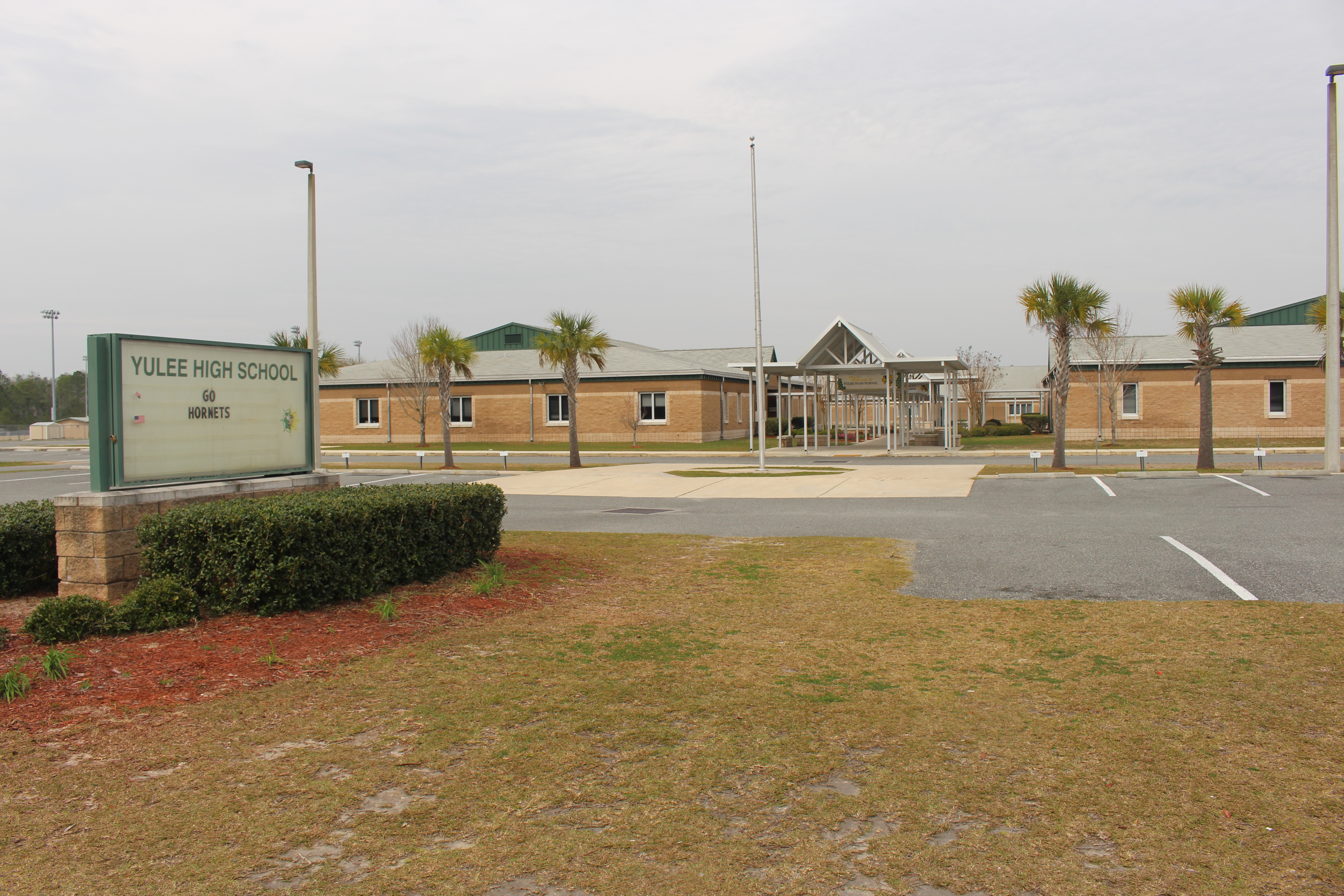
Yulee High School

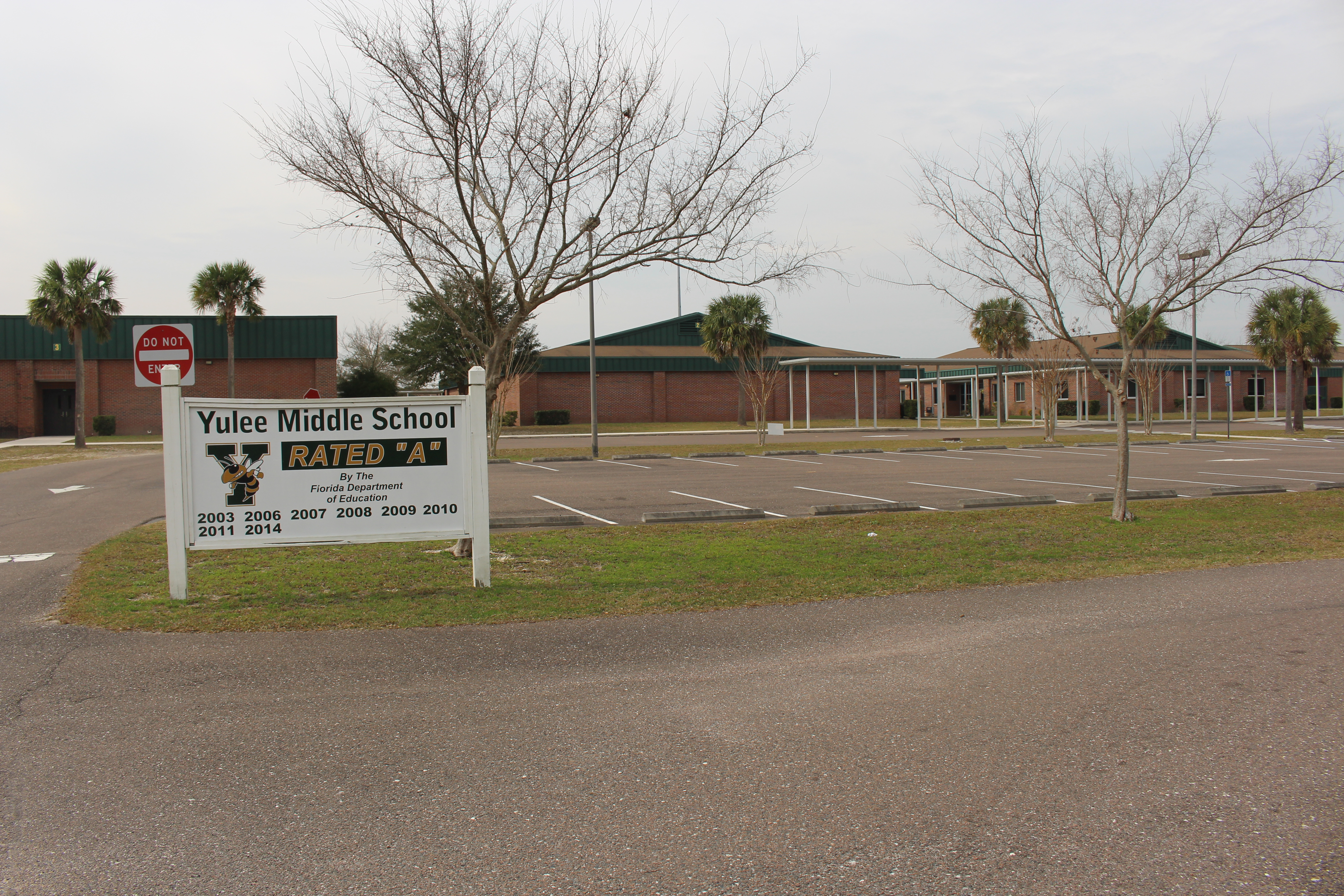
Yulee Middle School

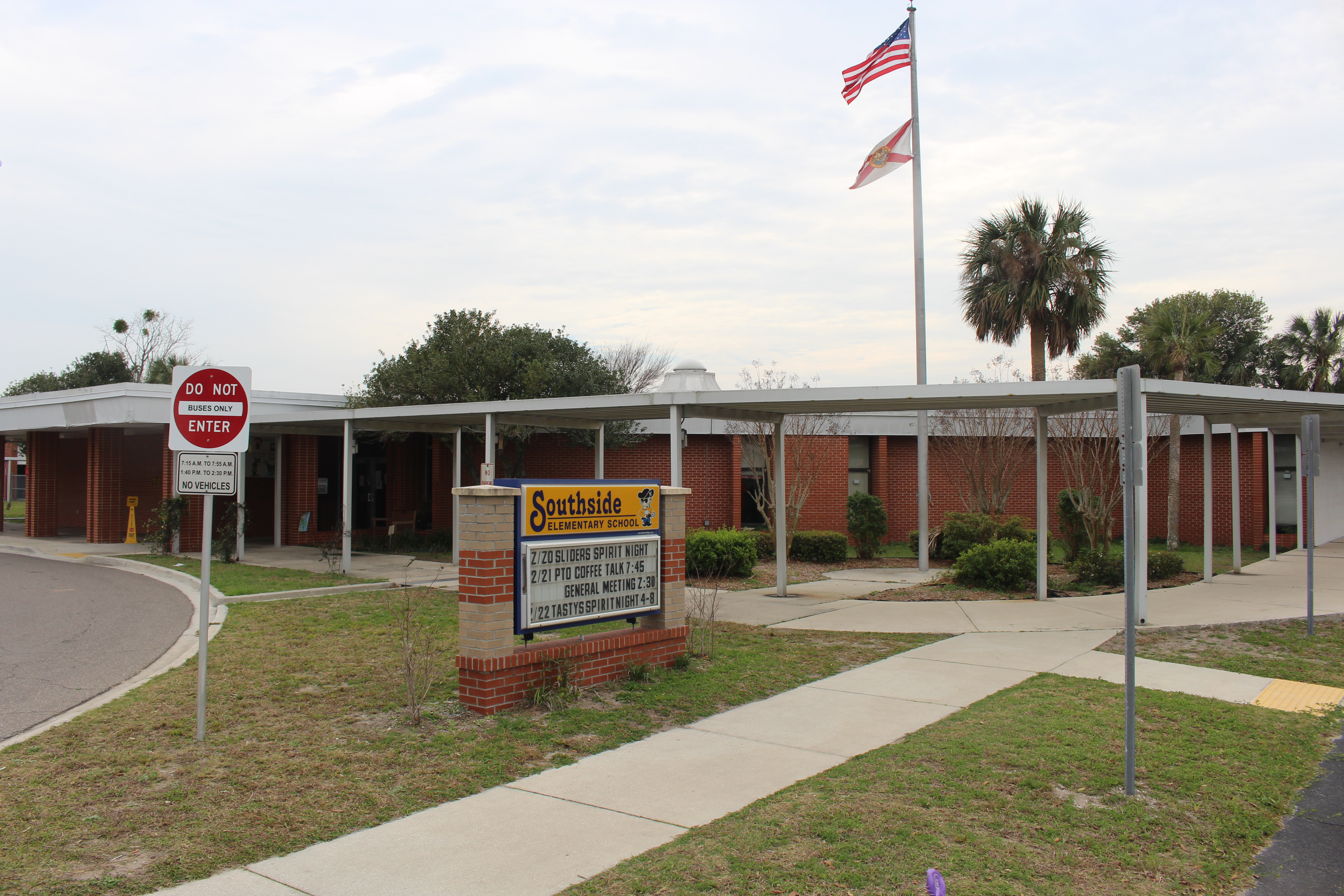
Southside Elementary School

== Geographic zones ==
NCSD's geographic zones determine the feeder plans for its schools.

Zone Grade	Fernandina Beach	Bryceville	Callahan	Yulee		Hilliard
K	Southside Elementary	Bryceville Elementary	Callahan Elementary	Yulee Primary	Wildlight Elementary	Hilliard Elementary
1	Southside Elementary	Bryceville Elementary	Callahan Elementary	Yulee Primary	Wildlight Elementary	Hilliard Elementary
2	Southside Elementary	Bryceville Elementary	Callahan Elementary	Yulee Primary	Wildlight Elementary	Hilliard Elementary
3	Emma Love Hardee Elementary	Bryceville Elementary	Callahan Intermediate	Yulee Elementary	Wildlight Elementary	Hilliard Elementary
4	Emma Love Hardee Elementary	Bryceville Elementary	Callahan Intermediate	Yulee Elementary	Wildlight Elementary	Hilliard Elementary
5	Emma Love Hardee Elementary	Bryceville Elementary	Callahan Intermediate	Yulee Elementary	Wildlight Elementary	Hilliard Elementary
6	Fernandina Beach Middle	Callahan Middle		Yulee Middle		Hilliard Middle-Senior High
7	Fernandina Beach Middle	Callahan Middle		Yulee Middle		Hilliard Middle-Senior High
8	Fernandina Beach Middle	Callahan Middle		Yulee Middle		Hilliard Middle-Senior High
9	Fernandina Beach High	West Nassau County High		Yulee High		Hilliard Middle-Senior High
10	Fernandina Beach High	West Nassau County High		Yulee High		Hilliard Middle-Senior High
11	Fernandina Beach High	West Nassau County High		Yulee High		Hilliard Middle-Senior High
12	Fernandina Beach High	West Nassau County High		Yulee High		Hilliard Middle-Senior High

== Controversy ==
In September 2024, NCSD settled a lawsuit with students and parents who had sued the district over alleged unlawful removal of books containing LGBTQ+ content from school libraries, with the district agreeing to replace three dozen books, including the children's book And Tango Makes Three, which the district agreed is not obscene and is appropriate for students of all ages.

The Nassau County School District which has had many scandals recently involving race, sex, and other social issues. The current superintendent Kathy Burns has denied the claims of systemic racism. Kathy Burns denied claims in a recent law suit Joinville v. Nassau County School Board. Since the passing of Amendment 1, Establishing School Board Elections as Partisan, Kathy Burns identified as a republican.

Civil rights groups and auditors also say that the school has systemic problems with opportunities and discipline regarding minorities. An audit from the state of Florida also shows that Black students with disabilities are more than 2 times more likely to get disciplined.
