= Nassau County Courthouse (Florida) =

Historic courthouse Florida, United States

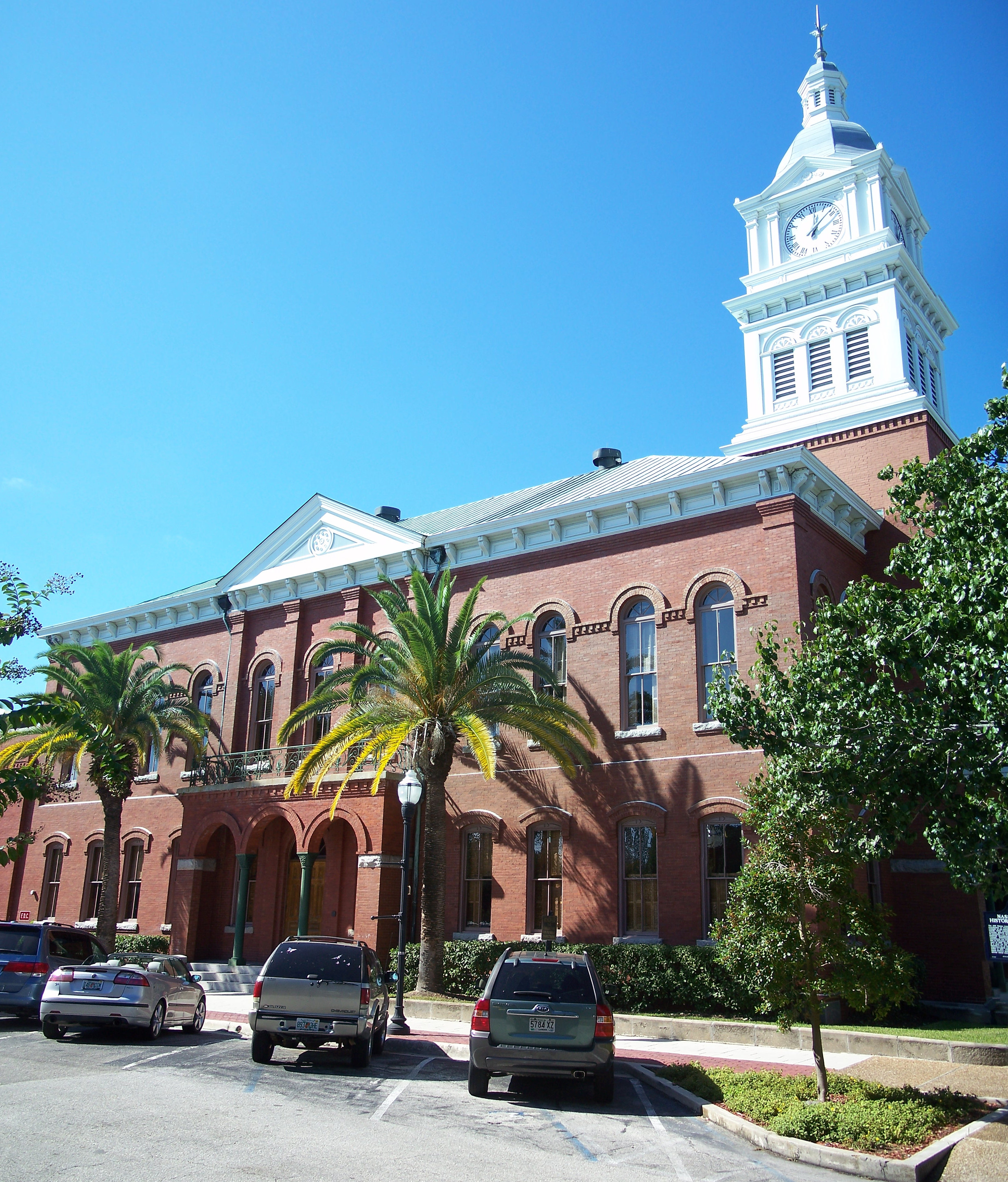
- Interactive map of the Nassau County Courthouse area

General information
- Architectural style: Classical Revival
- Location: 416 Centre Street, Fernandina Beach, Florida, United States
- Coordinates: 30.67048°N 81.46163°W
- Completed: 1891
- Cost: $20,614
- Client: Nassau County

Technical details
- Structural system: brick

The Nassau County Courthouse, also known as the Old Nassau County Courthouse and the Historic Nassau County Courthouse, is a historic two-story red brick courthouse building located at 416 Centre Street in Fernandina Beach, Nassau County, Florida. It was designed in the Classical Revival style.

== History ==
The courthouse was built in 1891 and features cast-iron Corinthian columns and a massive bell tower and steeple. Meneely and Co. of West Troy, New York, cast the bell for the tower, which was used as a fire alarm for many years.

In 1989, the Nassau County Courthouse was listed in A Guide to Florida's Historic Architecture, published by the University of Florida Press.

In 2002, the building was restored and renovated by The Auchter Company of Jacksonville. Also, in 2002, construction began on a new Judicial Annex at 76347 Veteran's Way in Yulee. It was opened in 2004.

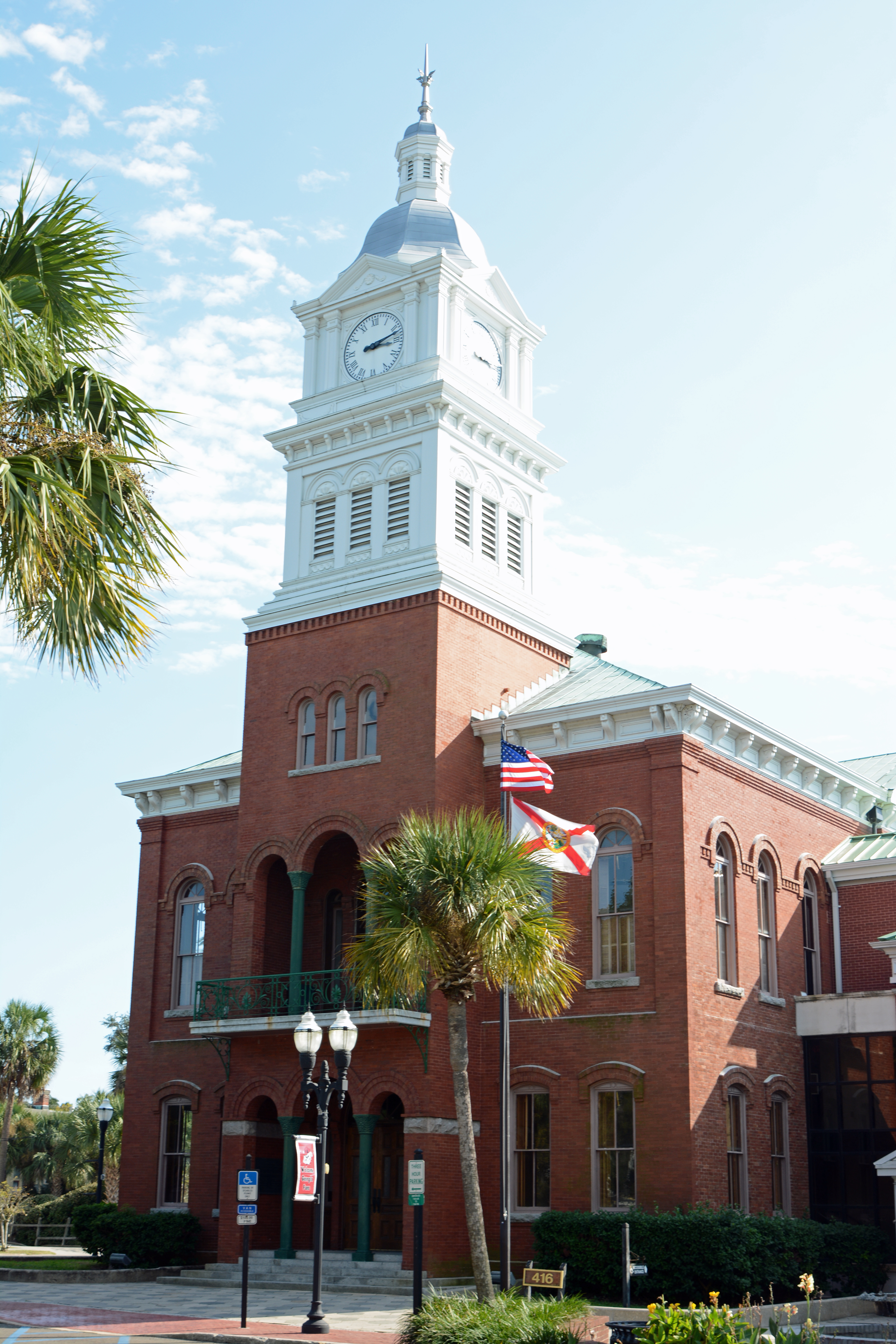
Front view

== See also ==
- United States Post Office, Custom House, and Courthouse (Fernandina, Florida)
