= Hilliard Airpark =

Airport in Florida, U.S.

Coordinates: 30°41′10.79″N 081°54′20.47″W

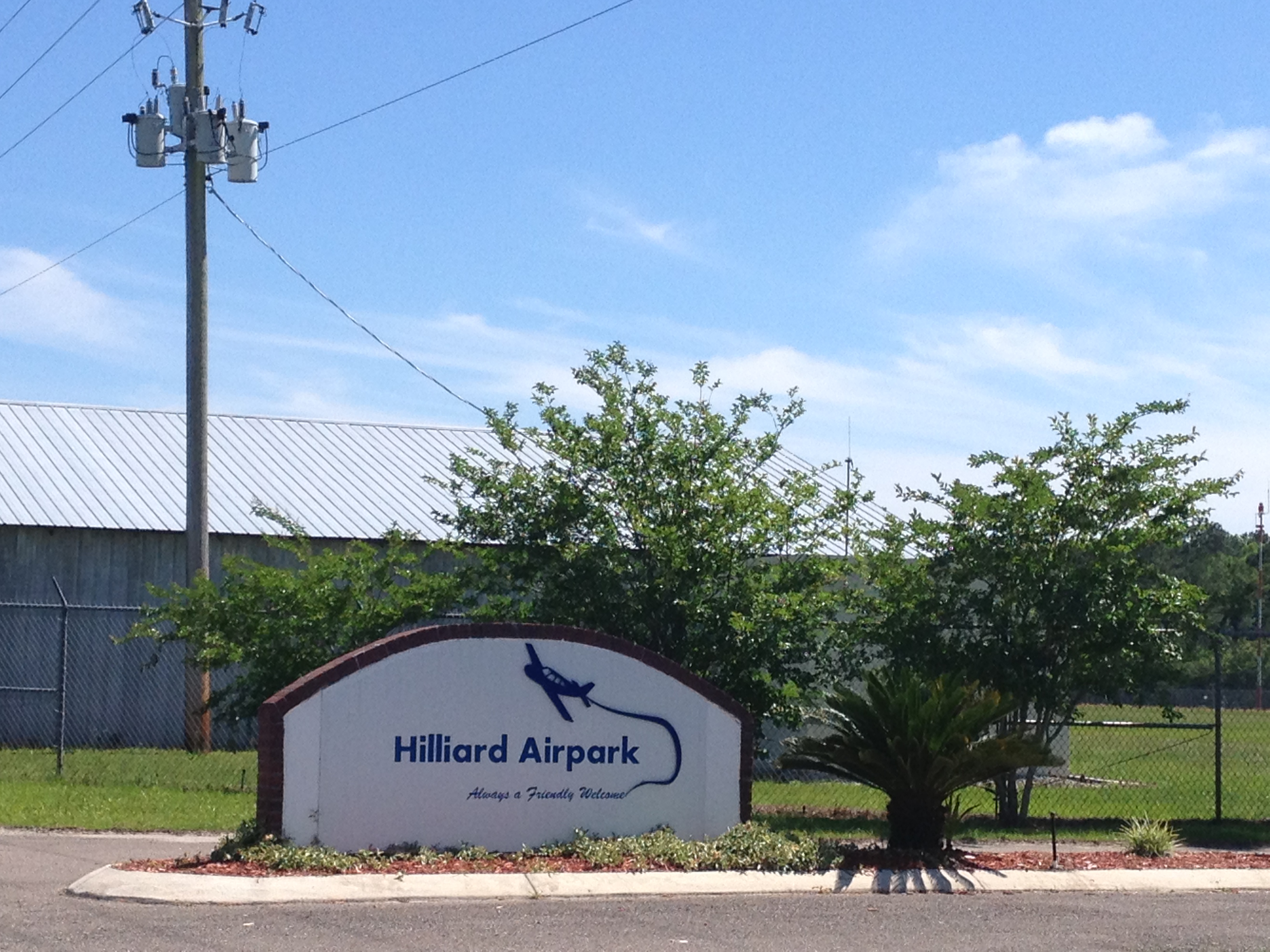
- IATA: none; ICAO: none; FAA LID: 01J

Summary
- Airport type: Public use
- Owner: Town of Hilliard
- Operator: Jack Bailey
- Serves: Hilliard, Florida
- Location: Nassau County, Florida
- Elevation AMSL: 59 ft (18 m)
- Interactive map of Hilliard Airpark

Runways
Direction	Length		Surface
Direction	ft	m	Surface
18/36	3,600	1,097	Turf

Statistics (2018)
- Aircraft operations (year ending 2/6/2018): 5,000
- Based aircraft: 21
- Source: Federal Aviation Administration

Hilliard Airpark (FAA LID: 01J) is a public-use airport located 1 mile (1.6 km) east of the central business district of the town of Hilliard in Nassau County, Florida, United States. The airport is publicly owned.

== See also ==
- List of airports in Florida
