= Fernandina Beach, Florida =

City in Florida, United States

Fernandina Beach
- City
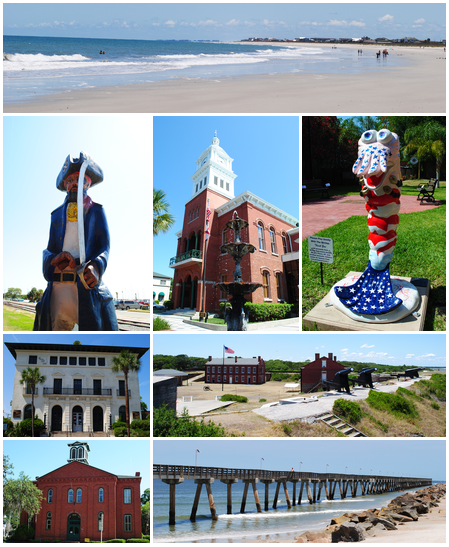
- Images from top, left to right: Beach, statue of a pirate (the mascot of Fernandina Beach High School), Nassau County Courthouse (Florida), shrimp statue (representing the annual Shrimp Festival), United States Post Office, Custom House, and Courthouse (Fernandina, Florida, 1912), Fort Clinch, Old School House, Fort Clinch Pier

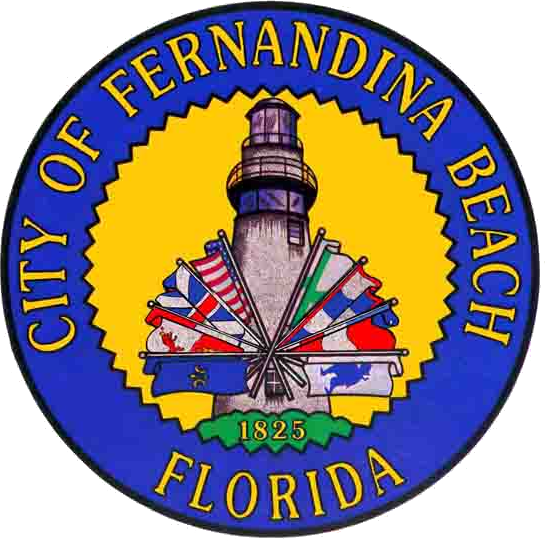
- Seal
- Nickname: Isle of 8 Flags
- Location in Nassau County and the state of Florida
- Coordinates: 30°38′10″N 81°27′22″W
- Country: United States
- State: Florida
- County: Nassau

Government
  - Type: Commissioner-Manager

Area
  - Total: 12.62 sq mi (32.68 km^{2})
  - Land: 11.83 sq mi (30.64 km^{2})
  - Water: 0.79 sq mi (2.04 km^{2})
- Elevation: 23 ft (7.0 m)

Population (2020)
  - Total: 13,052
  - Density: 1,103.1/sq mi (425.92/km^{2})
- Time zone: UTC−5 (EST)
  - Summer (DST): UTC−4 (EDT)
- ZIP codes: 32034-32035
- Area codes: 904, 324
- FIPS code: 12-22175
- GNIS feature ID: 2403607
- Website: www.fbfl.us.

Fernandina Beach is a city in and the county seat of Nassau County, Florida, United States, in the state's northeastern corner. It is the northernmost city on Florida's Atlantic coast, situated on Amelia Island, and is one of the municipalities comprising Greater Jacksonville (formally the Jacksonville, Florida Metropolitan Statistical Area).

As of the 2020 census, Fernandina Beach had a population of 13,052.

== History ==
The area was first inhabited by the Timucua people. Known as the "Isle of 8 Flags", Amelia Island has had the flags of the following nations flown over it: France, Spain, Great Britain, Spain (again), the Republic of East Florida (1812), the Republic of the Floridas (1817), Mexico, the Confederate States of America, and the United States.

The French, English, and Spanish all maintained a presence on Amelia Island at various times during the 16th, 17th, and 18th centuries, but the Spanish established Fernandina. The town of Fernandina, which was about a mile from the present city, was named in honor of King Ferdinand VII of Spain by the governor of the Spanish province of East Florida, Enrique White. Fernandina has the distinction of being the last Spanish city platted in the Western Hemisphere, in 1811.

According to the 2020 census, the city population was 13,052, up from 11,487 at the 2010 census. It is the seat of Nassau County. It is also the largest incorporated city in the county, since Yulee is an unincorporated town.

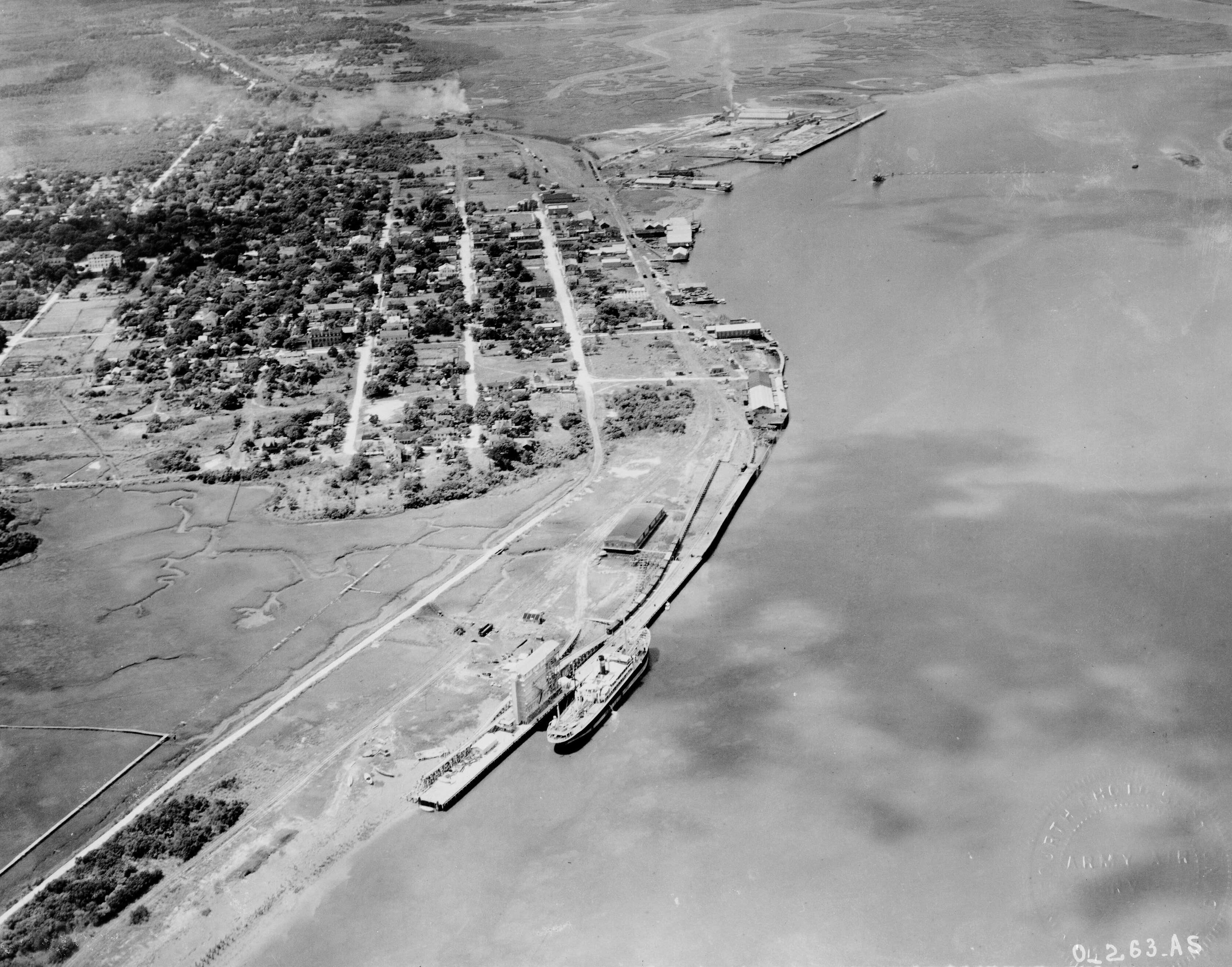
Fernandina Beach, December 1924

Prior to the arrival of Europeans on what is now Amelia Island, Native Americans occupied the site of the original town of Fernandina. Native American bands associated with the Timucuan mound-building culture had settled on the island about 1000 CE, calling it Napoyca. They remained on the island until the early 18th century, when European settlement began.

=== Old Town Fernandina ===
On January 1, 1811, Enrique White, governor of Spain's East Florida province, named the town of Fernandina, about a mile from the present city, in honor of King Ferdinand VII. On May 10 of that year, Fernandina became the last town platted under the Laws of the Indies in the Western hemisphere. The town was intended as a bulwark against U.S. territorial expansion. In the following years, it was captured and recaptured by a succession of renegades and privateers.

==== Republic of East Florida ====
At the beginning of the Patriot War, with the approval of President James Madison and Georgia Governor George Mathews on March 13, 1812, insurgents known as the "Patriots of Amelia Island" seized the island. After raising a Patriot flag, they replaced it with the United States flag. American gunboats under the command of Commodore Hugh Campbell maintained control of the island. On May 15, 1812, the British brig. Sappho fired on Gunboat no. 168, which had fired on the loyalist merchant vessel Fernando to prevent her leaving. Outgunned, the American gunboat withdrew, which enabled several vessels to escape from the port. President Madison eventually denounced the filibustering of George Mathews, however, on the grounds that Mathews had violated his instructions.

==== Mexico ====
Spanish pressure forced the American evacuation from the island in 1813. Spanish forces erected Fort San Carlos on the island in 1816. However, A Scottish soldier and adventurer named Gregor MacGregor with 55 musketeers seized Fort San Carlos in 1817, claiming the island on behalf of "the brethren of Mexico, Buenos Ayres, New Grenada and Venezuela", and raised the Green Cross of Florida flag over the Spanish Fort San Carlos. MacGregor claimed to be Brigadier General of the armies of the United Provinces of New Grenada and Venezuela (where he had successfully fought and led troops), and General-in-Chief of the armies for the two Floridas, commissioned by the Supreme Director of Mexico.

Spanish soldiers forced MacGregor's withdrawal, but their attempt to regain complete control was foiled by American irregulars organized by Ruggles Hubbard and former Pennsylvania congressman Jared Irwin. Hubbard and Irwin later joined forces with the French-born pirate Louis Aury, who laid claim to the island on behalf of the Republic of Mexico. U.S. Navy forces drove Aury from the island, and President James Monroe vowed to hold Amelia Island "in trust for Spain."

=== Modern Fernandina ===
In 1847 construction of Fort Clinch began in nearby present-day Fernandina. The Third System fort was named after General Duncan Lamont Clinch who fought in the War of 1812 and the Seminole Wars. Senator David Levy Yulee, founder of the Florida Railroad, wanted the eastern terminus of his railroad line to end in Amelia Island. The Old Town Fernandina was too cut off by the marshes to be used as a terminal. Yulee wanted to end the railroad on the banks of the Amelia River one mile to the south. The leaders of Fernandina did not want a new community to grow and prosper to surpass their town. The leaders of Fernandina decided to move the town up to the railroad where the present-day Fernandina Beach stands. Yulee began construction of the railroad in 1855 and was completed in 1861.

==== Civil War ====
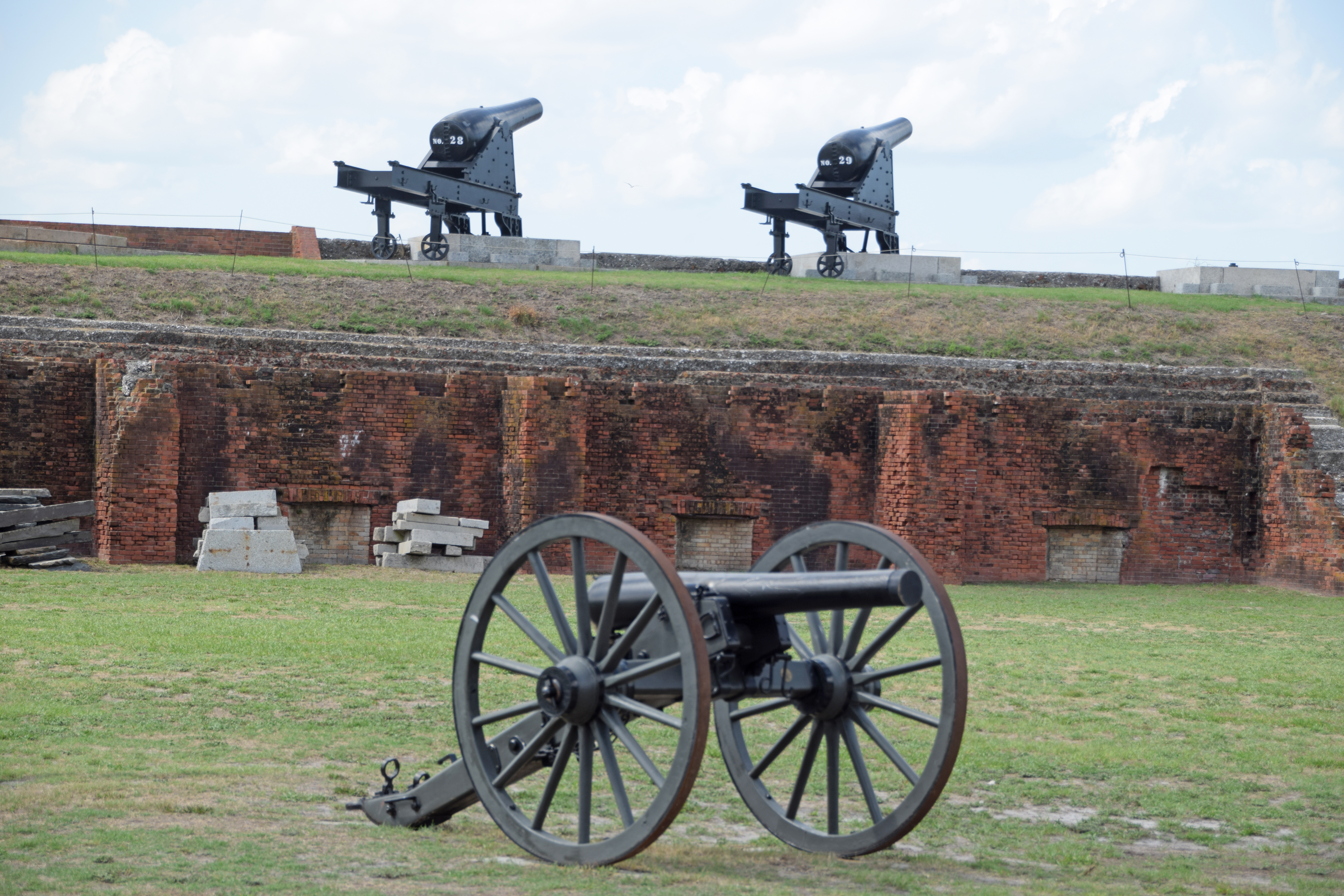
Inside Fort Clinch

On January 8, 1861, two days before Florida's secession, Confederate sympathizers (the Third Regiment of Florida Volunteers) took control of Fort Clinch, already abandoned by the Federal workers who had been enlarging the structure. The Confederates erected batteries on the northern end of Amelia Island but lacked the resources to fortify Fort Clinch. Robert E. Lee, who was commanding coastal defenses in the Deep South, ordered cannons and troops withdrawn in early 1862.

Lee's orders to withdraw the cannons and troops were too late. Union forces, consisting of 28 gunboats commanded by Commodore Samuel Dupont, occupied the island on March 3, 1862, and raised the American flag. In January 1863, the first all-black regiment of former slaves recruited to fight for the Union was read Lincoln's Emancipation Proclamation at Fernandina. Three weeks later they set sail up the St. Marys River to engage the Confederate forces. The Union used the fort as a base for its operations in the area for the remainder of the war.

==== Later 19th century ====
In 1891, Harmon Murray, who had been the leader of a criminal gang operating out of Gainesville, arrived in Fernandina, where his sister lived. Murray was soon committing burglaries and robberies in Fernandina and elsewhere on Amelia Island. Law officers chased a black suspect several times, who shot at them on one occasion. Murray taunted the police with a letter in early May, to the effect that he would not be taken alive, and would take the Nassau County sheriff and Fernandina police chief with him. Acting on a tip, on May 16 police surrounded the house Murray was staying in. Murray heard the officers getting into position, and shot and killed deputy sheriff Joseph W. Robinson. In the ensuing gun battle Murray wounded Fernandina Police Chief James Higgenbotham. Although grazed on the wrist and scalp, Murray was able to escape. Despite the intensive manhunt for him, Murray was able to slip off of Amelia Island to the mainland. The City of Fernandina offered a reward for the capture of Murray, "dead or alive".

== Geography ==
Fernandina Beach is located approximately 25 miles (40 km) northeast of downtown Jacksonville.

According to the United States Census Bureau, the city has a total area of 15.7 square miles (41 km^{2}), all land. It is the northernmost city on the eastern coast of Florida.

=== Climate ===
Fernandina Beach has a humid subtropical climate (Cfa) with long, hot, and rainy summers and short, mild winters.

Climate data for Fernandina Beach, Florida, 1991–2020 normals, extremes 1892–present
Month	Jan	Feb	Mar	Apr	May	Jun	Jul	Aug	Sep	Oct	Nov	Dec	Year
Record high °F (°C)	89 (32)	91 (33)	95 (35)	94 (34)	101 (38)	104 (40)	103 (39)	102 (39)	102 (39)	96 (36)	93 (34)	85 (29)	104 (40)
Mean maximum °F (°C)	77.6 (25.3)	79.8 (26.6)	83.6 (28.7)	87.7 (30.9)	91.9 (33.3)	94.7 (34.8)	96.0 (35.6)	95.4 (35.2)	91.8 (33.2)	87.3 (30.7)	82.7 (28.2)	79.2 (26.2)	97.1 (36.2)
Mean daily maximum °F (°C)	63.3 (17.4)	66.6 (19.2)	72.2 (22.3)	77.4 (25.2)	83.9 (28.8)	88.3 (31.3)	90.7 (32.6)	89.5 (31.9)	86.0 (30.0)	80.1 (26.7)	72.4 (22.4)	66.3 (19.1)	78.1 (25.6)
Daily mean °F (°C)	54.9 (12.7)	57.6 (14.2)	63.2 (17.3)	68.6 (20.3)	75.8 (24.3)	80.7 (27.1)	82.8 (28.2)	82.2 (27.9)	79.6 (26.4)	72.7 (22.6)	64.3 (17.9)	57.8 (14.3)	70.0 (21.1)
Mean daily minimum °F (°C)	45.4 (7.4)	48.6 (9.2)	54.1 (12.3)	59.8 (15.4)	67.7 (19.8)	73.1 (22.8)	74.9 (23.8)	74.9 (23.8)	73.2 (22.9)	65.3 (18.5)	56.1 (13.4)	49.4 (9.7)	61.9 (16.6)
Mean minimum °F (°C)	30.1 (−1.1)	32.9 (0.5)	37.7 (3.2)	45.9 (7.7)	56.2 (13.4)	66.1 (18.9)	69.4 (20.8)	70.1 (21.2)	64.8 (18.2)	49.0 (9.4)	38.8 (3.8)	34.4 (1.3)	28.3 (−2.1)
Record low °F (°C)	4 (−16)	17 (−8)	22 (−6)	35 (2)	40 (4)	47 (8)	53 (12)	61 (16)	49 (9)	33 (1)	24 (−4)	12 (−11)	4 (−16)
Average precipitation inches (mm)	3.20 (81)	3.13 (80)	3.27 (83)	3.03 (77)	2.68 (68)	6.12 (155)	4.96 (126)	6.39 (162)	7.19 (183)	4.97 (126)	1.87 (47)	3.12 (79)	49.93 (1,268)
Average precipitation days (≥ 0.01 in)	9.3	8.5	8.4	6.8	6.7	12.6	12.6	12.9	12.7	7.6	7.1	8.9	114.1
Source: NOAA

== Economy ==
In 2020, the total value of products produced in Fernandina Beach, Florida was $87.9 million.

== Demographics ==
Historical population
Census	Pop.	Note	%±
1860	1,390		—
1870	1,722		23.9%
1880	2,562		48.8%
1890	2,803		9.4%
1900	3,245		15.8%
1910	3,482		7.3%
1920	3,147		−9.6%
1930	3,023		−3.9%
1940	3,492		15.5%
1950	4,420		26.6%
1960	7,276		64.6%
1970	6,955		−4.4%
1980	7,224		3.9%
1990	8,765		21.3%
2000	10,549		20.4%
2010	11,487		8.9%
2020	13,052		13.6%
U.S. Decennial Census

=== Racial and ethnic composition ===
Fernandina Beach racial composition (Hispanics excluded from racial categories) (NH = Non-Hispanic)
Race	Pop 2010	Pop 2020	% 2010	% 2020
White (NH)	9,216	10,633	80.23%	81.47%
Black or African American (NH)	1,320	1,001	11.49%	7.67%
Native American or Alaska Native (NH)	38	17	0.33%	0.13%
Asian (NH)	131	114	1.14%	0.87%
Pacific Islander or Native Hawaiian (NH)	9	21	0.08%	0.16%
Some other race (NH)	16	38	0.14%	0.29%
Two or more races/Multiracial (NH)	147	407	1.28%	3.12%
Hispanic or Latino (any race)	610	821	5.31%	6.29%
Total	11,487	13,052	100.00%	100.00%

=== 2020 census ===
As of the 2020 census, Fernandina Beach had a population of 13,052. The median age was 58.4 years. 12.8% of residents were under the age of 18 and 36.4% were 65 years of age or older.

For every 100 females there were 87.6 males, and for every 100 females age 18 and over there were 85.6 males age 18 and over.

98.3% of residents lived in urban areas, while 1.7% lived in rural areas.

There were 6,063 households in Fernandina Beach, of which 18.4% had children under the age of 18 living in them. Of all households, 49.9% were married-couple households, 15.2% were households with a male householder and no spouse or partner present, and 29.3% were households with a female householder and no spouse or partner present. About 30.3% of all households were made up of individuals and 17.0% had someone living alone who was 65 years of age or older.

There were 7,964 housing units, of which 23.9% were vacant. The homeowner vacancy rate was 2.1% and the rental vacancy rate was 14.8%.

=== 2020 estimates ===
As of 2020, there were 3,544 families residing in the city.

In 2020, 4.0% of residents were under 5 years old, 49.8% of the population were female, and there were 1,576 veterans living in the city. 8.8% of residents were foreign born, 9.4% of those under age 65 lived with a disability, and 15.1% of those under age 65 did not have health insurance. There were 2.12 persons per household.

In 2020, 81.0% of housing units were owner-occupied. The median value of owner-occupied housing units was $356,600, and the median gross rent was $1,041. The median household income was $80,260 with a per capita income of $50,051. 10.2% of the population lived below the poverty threshold.

In 2020, 97.9% of households had a computer and 96.5% had a broadband internet subscription. Among people age 25 and older, 95.5% were high school graduates or higher and 45.5% had a bachelor's degree or higher.

=== 2010 census ===
As of the 2010 United States census, there were 11,487 people, 4,789 households, and 3017 families residing in the city.

=== Ethnicity ===
As of 2016, the largest self-reported ancestries/ethnicities in Fernandina Beach, Florida (excluding Hispanic/Latino groups) were:

Largest ancestries (2016)	Percent
English (England)	14.7%
American (United States)	14.5%
German (Germany)	12.6%
Irish (Republic of Ireland)	10.2%
Italian (Italy)	5.2%
French (France)	3.3%
Polish (Poland)	3.0%
Scottish (Scotland)	2.1%
Scots-Irish (Ulster/Northern Ireland)	2.1%
Dutch (Netherlands)	1.4%
Welsh (Wales)	1.3%
Norwegian (Norway)	1.2%
Russian (Russia)	0.6%
French Canadian (Canada) / (Quebec)	0.5%
Swedish (Sweden)	0.5%
Hungarian (Hungary)	0.5%

== Government and infrastructure ==
Nassau County Fire Rescue operates Station 20 on the south end of Amelia Island, as well as Station 70 Oneil.

The Fernandina Beach Municipal Airport is a general aviation airfield approximately three miles south of the city that serves Amelia Island.

== Education ==
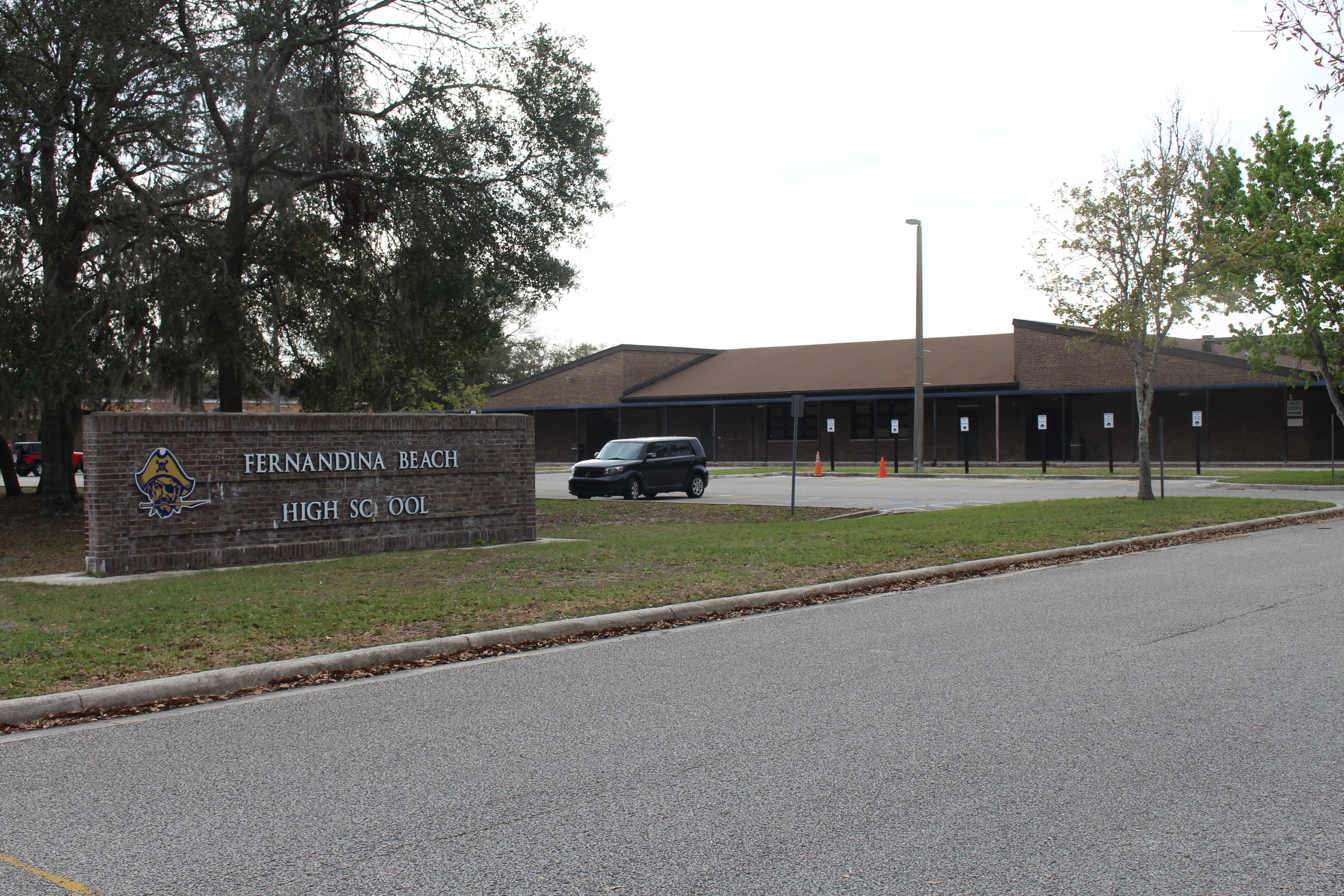
Fernandina Beach High School

The public schools of Fernandina Beach are part of the Nassau County School District. They include:

- Southside Elementary School (Pre-K–2)
- Emma Love Hardee Elementary School (3–5)
- Fernandina Beach Middle School (6–8)
- Fernandina Beach High School (9–12)
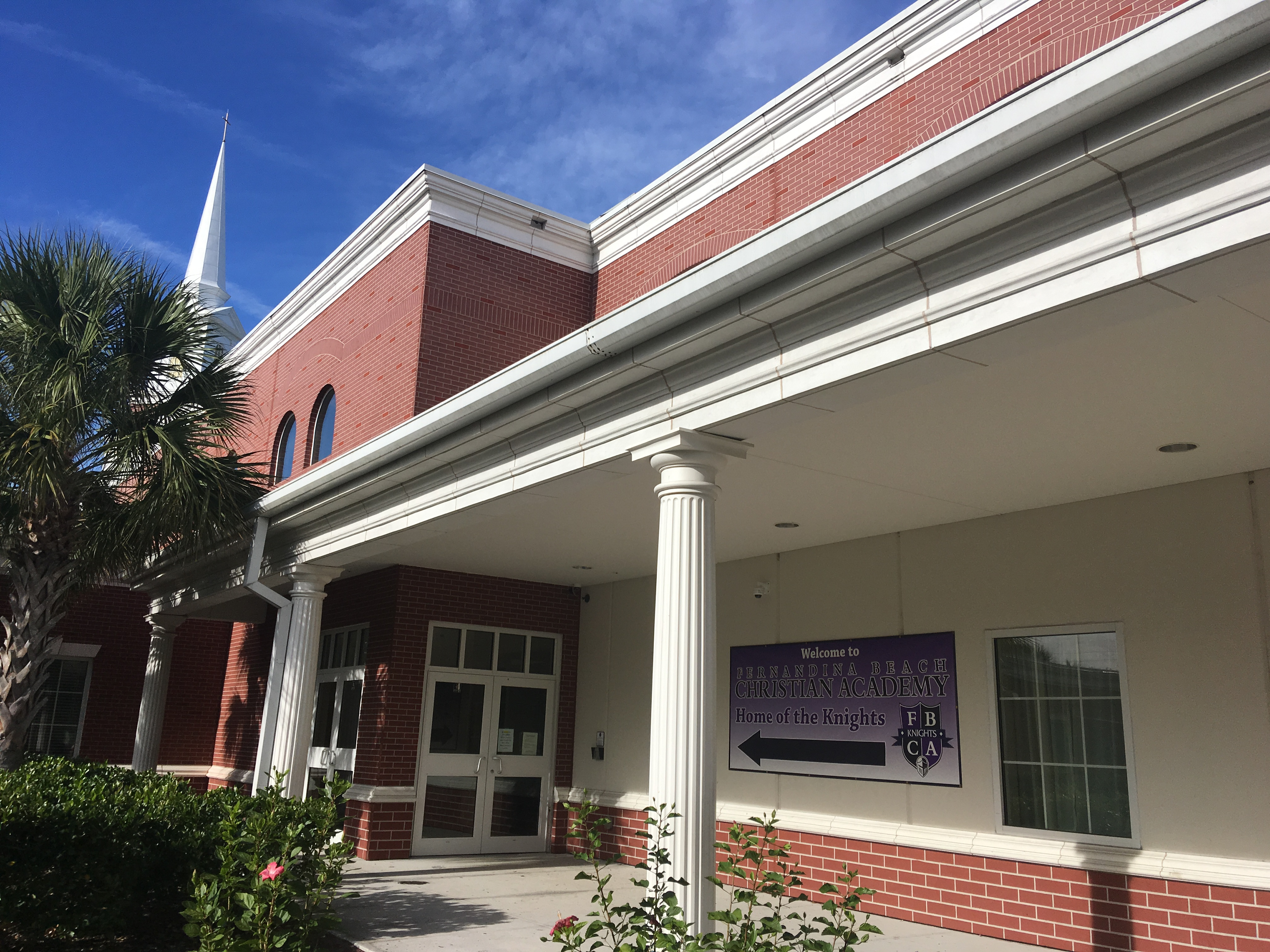
  Fernandina Beach Christian Academy

Private schools:

- Amelia Island Montessori School (Preschool–8)
- Fernandina Beach Christian Academy (K–8)
- St. Michael's Academy (Pre-K–8)

Note: Atlantic Elementary (2nd and 3rd grades) was closed at the end of the 2008 school year. After the closing, 2nd grade was moved to Southside and 3rd grade to Emma Love. Also, the private Catholic school, St. Michael's Academy, is in downtown Fernandina Beach. All three Fernandina Beach public schools are "A" rated by the State of Florida. The nickname of Fernandina Beach High School's athletic teams is the "Pirates". Amelia Island Montessori School is near American Beach and is accredited by the Florida Council of Independent Schools and is an associate member school with the American Montessori Society.

== Library ==
Nassau County Public Library operates the Fernandina Beach Branch which is located at 25 N. 4th Street. This is the main branch in the library system with a variety of services. The library also is a passport acceptance facility. This location underwent major renovations beginning in 2014 through early 2015, but is still currently located in the historic downtown area.

== Notable people ==
- William B. Allen, chairman of the United States Commission on Civil Rights from 1988 to 1989
- Aaron Bean, U.S. representative
- Liberty Billings, Reconstruction era politician
- Raymond A. Brown, attorney
- George Rainsford Fairbanks, a Confederate Major in the U.S. Civil War and Florida State Senator.
- Joseph Finegan, Brigadier general for the Confederate States Army
- Katrina Foster, Lutheran bishop
- Broadway Jones, singer and jazz musician
- Anna Madgigine Jai Kingsley, wife of slave trader and planter Zephaniah Kingsley
- Samuel Petty, politician
- Rick Stockstill, football head coach at Middle Tennessee
- David Levy Yulee, first U.S. Senator from Florida and builder of Florida's first cross-state railroad

== Attractions ==
The 1988 fantasy film The New Adventures of Pippi Longstocking was filmed in Fernandina Beach and at soundstages in Jacksonville. The house that stood in for Villa Villekulla, Pippi's home, is known locally as Captain Bell's House and is on Estrada Street in the Old Town area directly across from the Fernandina Plaza (parade ground for the Spanish fort) and overlooking the Amelia River.

The Isle of Eight Flags Shrimp Festival occurs annually over the first weekend in May. Events and activities of the festival include vendors with seafood, arts, crafts, collectibles and antiques, live music, the Miss Shrimp Festival pageant, a fireworks display and a parade.

== Historic places ==
- Original Town of Fernandina Historic Site
- Fairbanks House
- Historic Nassau County Courthouse
- United States Post Office, Custom House, and Courthouse (Fernandina, Florida, 1912)
- Fort Clinch State Park
- See National Register of Historic Places listings in Nassau County, Florida
