= Fernandina Beach High School =

Coordinates: 30.6625°N 81.4454°W

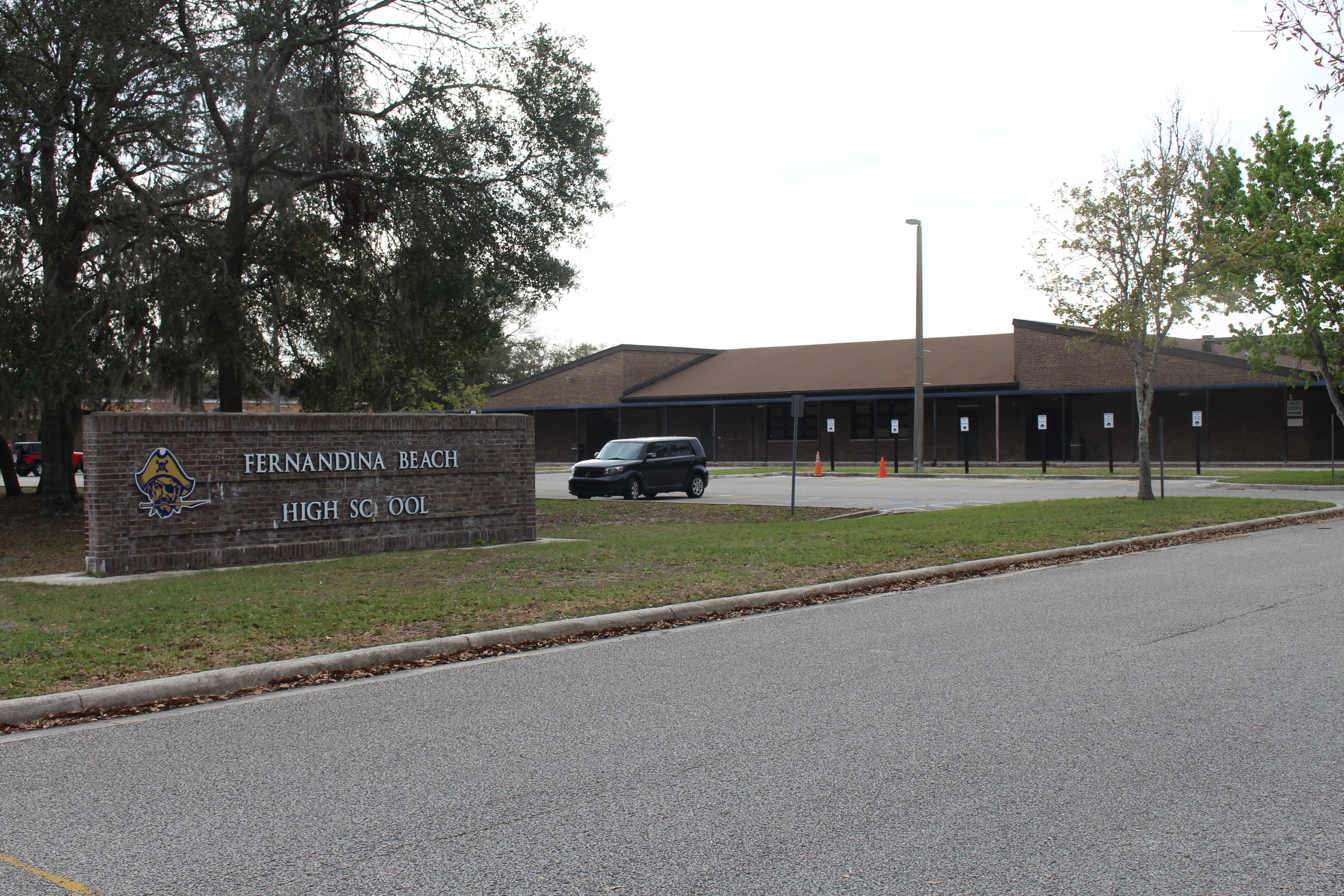

Location
- 435 Citrona Drive; Fernandina Beach, Florida 32034–2741; United States

Information
- Type: Public high school
- School district: Nassau County School District
- NCES District ID: 1201350
- CEEB code: 100460
- NCES School ID: 120135002851
- Principal: Chris Webber
- Teaching staff: 56.50 (FTE)
- Grades: 9–12
- Enrollment: 980 (2023-2024)
- Student to teacher ratio: 17.35
- Colors: Blue and Gold
- Mascot: Pirate
- Website: https://www.nassau.k12.fl.us/o/fbhs

Fernandina Beach High School is a public high school located in Fernandina Beach, Florida, United States. It is part of the Nassau County School District and serves grades 9 through 12. Chris Webber is the school's principal. For athletics, the school's colors are blue and gold and its teams' nickname is the "Pirates".

== Notable alumni ==
- Aaron Bean, U.S. Representative from Florida
- Clint Crisher, American singer-songwriter
- Terrence Flagler, former NFL player
- Jason Mudd, founder of Axia Public Relations
- Rick Stockstill, former head coach of Middle Tennessee State University
