= West Nassau High School =

Public high school in Callahan, Florida, United States

Location
- 1 Warrior Dr. Callahan, Florida; United States; 30.558005°N 81.831061°W

Information
- Type: Public, Secondary
- Motto: "Home of the Warriors"
- Established: 1936 (Callahan High) 1968 (West Nassau High)
- School district: Nassau County School District
- Principal: Richard Pearce
- Asst principals: Sherida Jones and Lester Smith
- Teaching staff: 46.00 (FTE)
- Grades: 9-12
- Gender: Co-Educational
- Enrollment: 974 (2022-2023)
- Student to teacher ratio: 21.17
- Colors: Cardinal and gold
- Mascot: Warrior
- Nickname: Warriors
- Accreditation: AdvancED
- Yearbook: The Warrior
- Website: https://www.nassau.k12.fl.us/o/wnhs

West Nassau High School is a rural public high school for grade 9-12 located in the town of Callahan, Florida. It is one of three 9-12 high schools in the Nassau County School District. Nassau County is rated as an "A" School District under the Florida A+ Evaluation System. The School is located off Highway 301 and ½ mile from U.S. 1, at 1 Warrior Drive. The main north/south CSX rail line is located directly behind the athletic complex of West Nassau High School.

== School spirit ==
"Cherokee" is the school's official fight song, arranged by former directors of the Warrior Band. "War Chant" written and arranged by Florida State University is alternatively used as one of the fight songs. The school's mascot is Lenny the Warrior, who retired in 2003 and returned in 2022. (2004-2021 Lenny was replaced by various white horses and a student dressed as an Indian warrior.)

== History ==
West Nassau High School opened in August 1936 as Callahan High School (now the location of Callahan Elementary School). The school was combined at the time with Callahan Elementary with the name Callahan School. According to the Nassau County School Board, teachers were hired in July 1936 under the names of Callahan High and Callahan Elementary.

The school's mascot was the Ramblers. The school colors were then Blue and Gold.

The final month of classes at Callahan High was June 1968. During this period of time the State of Florida was mandated by Federal Law under the Civil Rights Act of 1964 to desegregate its school systems statewide and allow African Americans to attend its all-white public school systems. The African American students from Hilliard and Callahan who were previously attending the all African American school of Pine Forrest Community School in grades K through 12 in Callahan were allowed to receive an education equal to their white counterparts.

Mr. Emmitt Coakley, the football coach at Pine Forrest Community School, would later become the principal at West Nassau High School.

In August 1968, Hilliard High School and Callahan High School were combined at a new location to form West Nassau County High School. The Flashes of Hilliard and the Ramblers of Callahan became the Warriors of West Nassau County High School. The school colors at West Nassau represent the consolidation of the two schools with the cardinal red representing Hilliard High School and gold representing Callahan High School.

The Class of 2009 marked the 40th anniversary of West Nassau County High School. Hilliard students attended high school at West Nassau (Callahan) for three years and then Hilliard Combined 6-12 School was re-opened. Even though Hilliard reopened their combined middle/high school, the high school in Callahan continued-to-be named West Nassau County High School and the name was not changed back to Callahan High School. The school has been serving students from the Bryceville and Callahan area since 1968.

== Student population ==
The student population reached an all-time high of 1500 in the school year of 2009–2010. The population is projected to continue growing as Jacksonville continues to expand northward and real estate prices continue to rise in the eastern area of the county.

== Recent construction ==
Recent construction projects include a new building construction lab, a new technology lab, three new classrooms, two new girls’ locker rooms and two renovated boys’ locker rooms. Ten portable classrooms are necessary to accommodate the students.

== Community pride ==
The community of Callahan placed the warrior head insignia and "Home of the Warriors" on the town water tower in 2005 to demonstrate support for the school. The water tower logo is positioned so people entering Callahan from either direction are welcomed by the Warrior Head logo on the tower. Every game day, the local restaurants would advertise that day's game on their sign.

== Band ==
The Warrior Band's current director is William Jason Eason. Eason is a C/o 2000 graduate from WNHS. The Warrior Band was awarded the Otto Kraushaar trophy for receiving Straight Superior in every adjudicated performance at District and State 2001, 2002 and 2005. The Warrior band qualified for State by receiving a Superior at District evaluations for 25 consecutive years. In 2010 Mr. Don Reynolds was awarded the highest honor bestowed on a High School Director by receiving the Oliver Hobbs Award from the Florida Bandmasters Association. In 2004 the band played for the inauguration of President George W. Bush.

== Notable alumni ==
- Howie Kendrick, former MLB player for the Washington Nationals, Los Angeles Angels of Anaheim, Los Angeles Dodgers, and Philadelphia Phillies. MVP of the 2019 National League Championship Series. 2019 World Series Champion with the Washington Nationals
- Ben "Bubba" Dickerson, professional golfer
- Frank Murphy Jr former NFL football player for the Chicago Bears, Tampa Bay Buccaneers, Houston Texans and Miami Dolphins
