= National Register of Historic Places listings in Nassau County, Florida =

Location of Nassau County in Florida

This is a list of the National Register of Historic Places listings in Nassau County, Florida.

This is intended to be a complete list of the properties and districts on the National Register of Historic Places in Nassau County, Florida, United States. The locations of National Register properties and districts for which the latitude and longitude coordinates are included below, may be seen in a map.

There are 15 properties and districts listed on the National Register in the county.

This National Park Service list is complete through NPS recent listings posted November 6, 2026.

Contents: Counties in Florida (non-linked contain no National Register listings)
Alachua - Baker - Bay - Bradford - Brevard - Broward - Calhoun - Charlotte - Citrus - Clay - Collier - Columbia - DeSoto - Dixie - Duval - Escambia - Flagler - Franklin - Gadsden - Gilchrist - Glades - Gulf - Hamilton - Hardee - Hendry - Hernando - Highlands - Hillsborough (Tampa) - Holmes - Indian River - Jackson - Jefferson - Lafayette - Lake - Lee - Leon - Levy - Liberty - Madison - Manatee - Marion - Martin - Miami-Dade (Miami) - Monroe - Nassau - Okaloosa - Okeechobee - Orange - Osceola - Palm Beach - Pasco - Pinellas - Polk - Putnam - St. Johns - St. Lucie - Santa Rosa - Sarasota - Seminole - Sumter - Suwannee - Taylor - Union - Volusia - Wakulla - Walton - Washington

== Current listings ==
	Name on the Register	Image	Date listed	Location	City or town	Description
1	Amelia Island Lighthouse	Amelia Island Lighthouse	February 13, 2003 (#03000004)	215½ Lighthouse Circle; 30°40′23″N 81°26′33″W	Fernandina Beach	Part of the Florida's Historic Lighthouses MPS (see Florida's MPS)
2	American Beach Historic District	American Beach Historic District	January 28, 2002 (#01001532)	Roughly bounded by Gregg, Lewis, Leonard, Main, and James Streets, and Ocean Boulevard; 30°34′24″N 81°26′46″W	American Beach	
3	Bailey House	Bailey House	June 4, 1973 (#73000591)	28 South 7th Street; 30°40′11″N 81°27′34″W	Fernandina Beach	Built ca. 1895
4	Bosque Bello Cemetery	Bosque Bello Cemetery	November 3, 2026 (#100013578)	Bounded by N 14th St., Bosque Bello St., and Magnolia St. 30°41′12″N 81°27′02″W	Fernandina Beach	
5	Ervin's Rest	Ervin's Rest	April 23, 1998 (#98000376)	5448 Gregg Street; 30°34′30″N 81°26′39″W	American Beach	Contributing property to American Beach Historic District
6	Fairbanks House	Fairbanks House	June 4, 1973 (#73000592)	227 South 7th Street; 30°40′02″N 81°27′38″W	Fernandina Beach	Built in 1885
7	Fernandina Beach Historic District	Fernandina Beach Historic District	July 20, 1973 (#73000593)	Roughly bounded by North 9th Street, Broome, Ash, South 5th Street, Date, and South 8th Street; also roughly bounded by Sixth, Broome, North Third, and Escambia Streets, Seventh and Date Streets, and Ash; 30°40′13″N 81°27′42″W	Fernandina Beach	Second set of boundaries represents a boundary increase of April 20, 1987.
8	Fort Clinch	Fort Clinch	February 23, 1972 (#72000343)	3 miles north of Fernandina Beach on State Road A1A; 30°42′17″N 81°27′18″W	Fernandina Beach	
9	Hippard House	Hippard House	October 12, 2001 (#01001087)	5406 Ervin Street; 30°34′34″N 81°26′48″W	American Beach	
10	Merrick-Simmons House	Merrick-Simmons House	January 13, 1983 (#83001431)	102 South 10th Street; 30°40′08″N 81°27′26″W	Fernandina Beach	
11	Mount Olive Missionary Baptist Church	Mount Olive Missionary Baptist Church	August 28, 1998 (#98001099)	State Road 107; 30°34′42″N 81°31′08″W	Nassauville	
12	Nassau County Jail	Nassau County Jail	November 18, 2009 (#09000927)	233 South 3rd Street; 30°40′04″N 81°27′50″W	Fernandina Beach	Now houses the Amelia Island Museum of History
13	Original Town of Fernandina Historic Site	Original Town of Fernandina Historic Site	January 29, 1990 (#86003685)	Roughly bounded by Towngate Street, the city cemetery, and Nassau, Marine, and Ladies Streets; 30°41′20″N 81°27′16″W	Fernandina Beach	
14	John Denham Palmer House	John Denham Palmer House	July 3, 1986 (#86001453)	1305 Atlantic Avenue; 30°40′13″N 81°27′09″W	Fernandina Beach	
15	Tabby House	Tabby House	June 4, 1973 (#73000594)	27 South 7th Street; 30°40′11″N 81°27′36″W	Fernandina Beach	Built in 1885

== See also ==
- List of National Historic Landmarks in Florida
- National Register of Historic Places listings in Florida
