= Palmer House =

Palmer House may refer to:

== In the United Kingdom ==
- Palmer House, Great Torrington, an 18th-century house in Devon

== In the United States ==
Items in this section are alphabetized by state, then city.

- Palmer House (Blackton, Arkansas)
- E. Payne Palmer House
- A. Z. Palmer House, Taylor, Arizona, listed on the NRHP in Navajo County, Arizona
- Jordan Palmer House, Taylor, Arizona, listed on the NRHP in Navajo County, Arizona
- Judge Augustus C. Palmer House, Calistoga, California, listed on the NRHP in Napa County, California
- Annie Palmer House, Point Arena, California, listed on the NRHP in Mendocino County, California
- Minnie Hill Palmer House, Chatsworth, California
- Palmer Hall (Colorado Springs, Colorado)
- Hezekiah Palmer House, Branford, Connecticut
- Isaac Palmer House, Branford, Connecticut
- John Palmer House (Lisbon, Connecticut)
- Capt. Nathaniel B. Palmer House, Stonington, Connecticut
- Amos Palmer House (Stonington, Connecticut)
- Palmer Home, Dover, Delaware
- John Denham Palmer House, Fernandia Beach, Florida
- Palmer-Perkins House, Monticello, Florida
- Palmer House (Monticello, Florida)
- Palmer House, Atlanta, Georgia, demolished 2011
- B. J. Palmer House, Davenport, Iowa, listed on the NRHP in Scott County, Iowa
- The Palmer House Hilton, Chicago, Illinois, historic hotel
- Col. Gustavius A. Palmer House, Crystal Lake, Illinois
- Hiram Palmer House, Farmington, Illinois
- Dana-Palmer House, Cambridge, Massachusetts
- Dorsey-Palmer House, Hagerstown, Maryland
- William B. and Mary Shuford Palmer House, Ann Arbor, Michigan
- George W. Palmer House, Chelsea, Michigan
- Charles Palmer House, Imlay City, Michigan
- Lorenzo Palmer and Ruth Wells House, Hudson, Michigan
- Albert Palmer House, Owosso, Michigan
- Myrick-Palmer House, Pontiac, Michigan
- The Palmer House (Sauk Centre)
- Lindamood Building of Palmer Home for Children, Columbus, Mississippi, listed on the NRHP in Lowndes County, Mississippi
- Palmer-Marsh House, Bath, North Carolina, a National Historic Landmark
- Palmer-Lewis Estate, Bedford, New York
- Palmer House (Northfield Center, Ohio), listed on the NRHP in Summit County, Ohio
- Palmer House (Dayton, Oregon)
- John Palmer House (Portland, Oregon)
- Amos Palmer House (Langhorne, Pennsylvania)
- Palmer-Northrup House, North Kingstown, Rhode Island
- Arnold-Palmer House, Providence, Rhode Island
- W. E. Palmer House, Henning, Tennessee, also known as Alex Haley House and Museum, a Tennessee state historic site in Lauderdale County
- Gen. Joseph B. Palmer House, Murfreesboro, Tennessee
- Thomas H. Palmer House, Pittsford, Vermont
- Charles R. Palmer House, Burlington, Vermont
- Amiss-Palmer House, Blacksburg, Virginia
- O. K. Palmer House, Chehalis, Washington
- Palmer Brother's Octagons, near West Salem, Wisconsin

== See also ==
- John Palmer House (disambiguation)
