= John Palmer House =

John Palmer House may refer to:

- John Palmer House (Lisbon, Connecticut)
- John Denham Palmer House, Fernandia Beach, Florida
- John Palmer House (Portland, Oregon)

== See also ==
- Palmer House (disambiguation)
