= Fernandina Beach Historic District =

Historic district in Florida, United States

- U.S. National Register of Historic Places
- U.S. Historic district
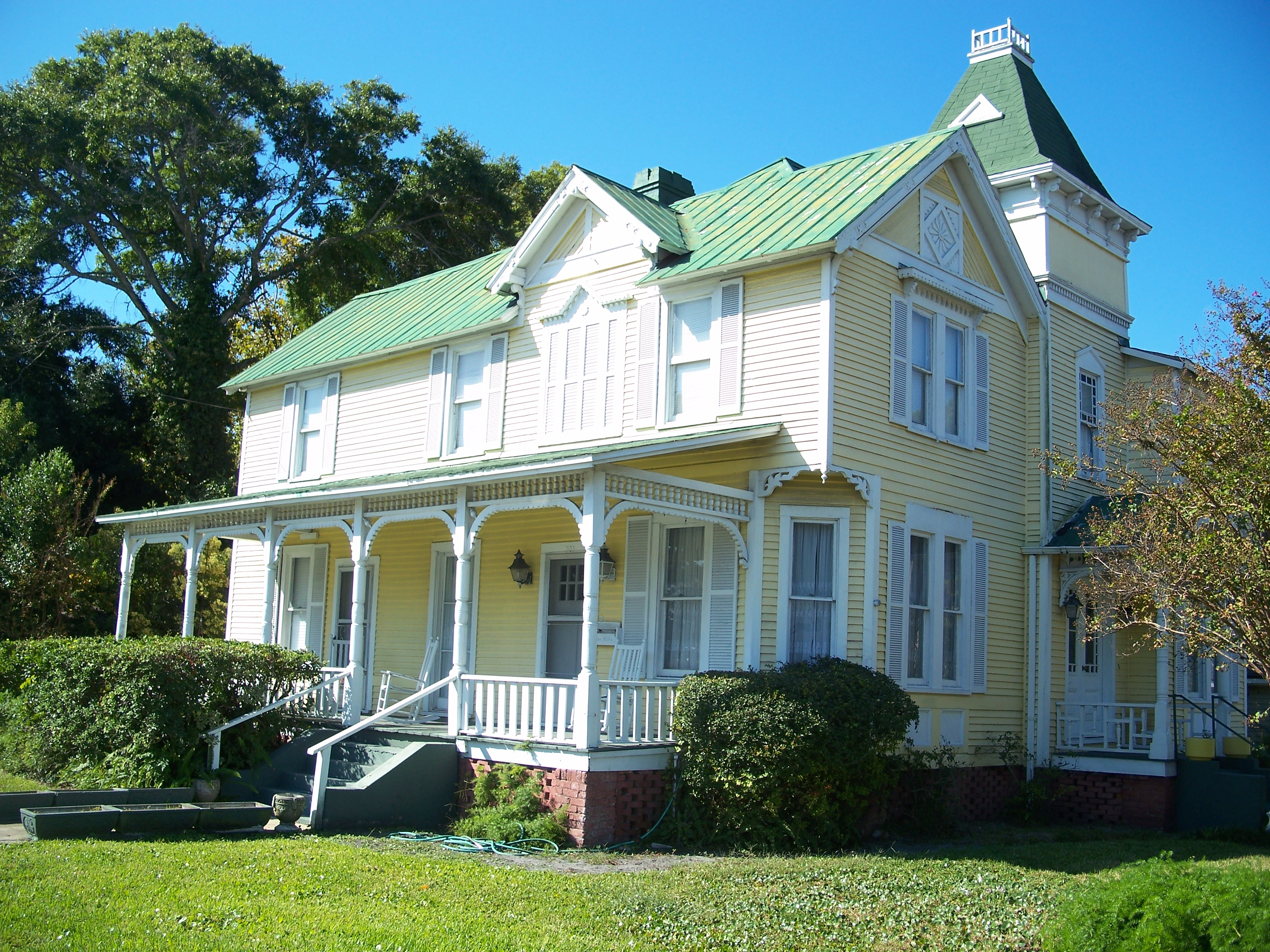

- Location within Florida Location within the United States
- Location: Fernandina Beach, Florida
- Coordinates: 30°40′13″N 81°27′42″W
- Area: 1,500 acres (610 ha)
- Architectural style: Victorian and Frame Vernacular (predominant styles)
- NRHP reference No.: 73000593 (original); 87000195 (increase)

Significant dates
- Added to NRHP: July 20, 1973
- Boundary increase: April 20, 1987

The Fernandina Beach Historic District is a U.S. historic district located in Fernandina Beach, Florida on Amelia Island. The Fernandina Beach Historic District was included on the National Register of Historic Places on July 20, 1973 and encompasses approximately 1,500 acres (610 ha), bounded by North 9th Street, Broome, Ash, South 5th Street, Date, and South 8th Street. On April 20, 1987, the National Register listing was expanded to include an additional 970 acres (3.9 km^{2}), bounded by Sixth, Broome, North 3rd, & Escambia Streets; Seventh & Date Streets, and Ash. Approximately 300 buildings are included in this district.

David Levy Yulee, one of the first United States senators from Florida, established the first cross-state railroad running from Fernandina Beach to Cedar Key, which opened on March 1, 1861. When Yulee established the railroad, he platted "new" Fernandina, shifting the town of Fernandina to its present location. Prior to this, Fernandina was located further north in what is now known as Old Town, or the Original Town of Fernandina Historic Site, also on the National Register of Historic Places. The railroad development, in addition to the bustling maritime industry along the Amelia River waterfront, caused "new" Fernandina to boom. Buildings in the Fernandina Beach Historic District reflect this late 19th and early 20th century development.

Significant buildings within the Historic District include the Nassau County Courthouse, the Post Office, the Train Depot, Public School No. 1, St. Peter's Episcopal Church, the First Presbyterian Church, St. Michael's Catholic Church and Academy, the Waas House, the Fairbanks House, the Tabby House, and the Bailey House. Residential architecture is most commonly frame vernacular style, often with Queen Anne influences. Robert Schuyler, a well-known architect in northeast Florida, designed St. Peter's and Public School No. 1. The Post Office is credited to James Knox Taylor, Supervising Architect of the United States Department of Treasury from 1897 to 1912.

The City of Fernandina Beach recognized the importance of the Historic District in telling the story of Fernandina's heritage, and in 1975 passed a historic preservation ordinance protecting this district by establishing local boundaries. The ordinance also created design guidelines for rehabilitation and construction projects on the historic buildings, and in addition created the City's Historic District Council, who reviews the projects. In 1985 and again in 2007, the City had the Historic District professionally surveyed to inventory the historic buildings. The ordinance and City land development regulations have been updated periodically to reflect contemporary historic preservation practices and to include updated information based on the surveys. The John Denham Palmer House, Amelia Island Lighthouse, and Peck High School have also all been individually included in the local historic district boundaries.

The Historic District is home to shops, restaurants, bed and breakfasts, and residences. The Amelia Island Museum of History is directly adjacent to the District, and Fort Clinch and the beach are within a short distance east. Each year in May, the Isle of Eight Flags Shrimp Festival takes place in the Historic District, attracting thousands of visitors.

== See also ==
- Bailey House
- Liberty Billings
- Fairbanks House
- John Denham Palmer House
- Merrick-Simmons House
- Tabby House
- Old Town

== Gallery ==
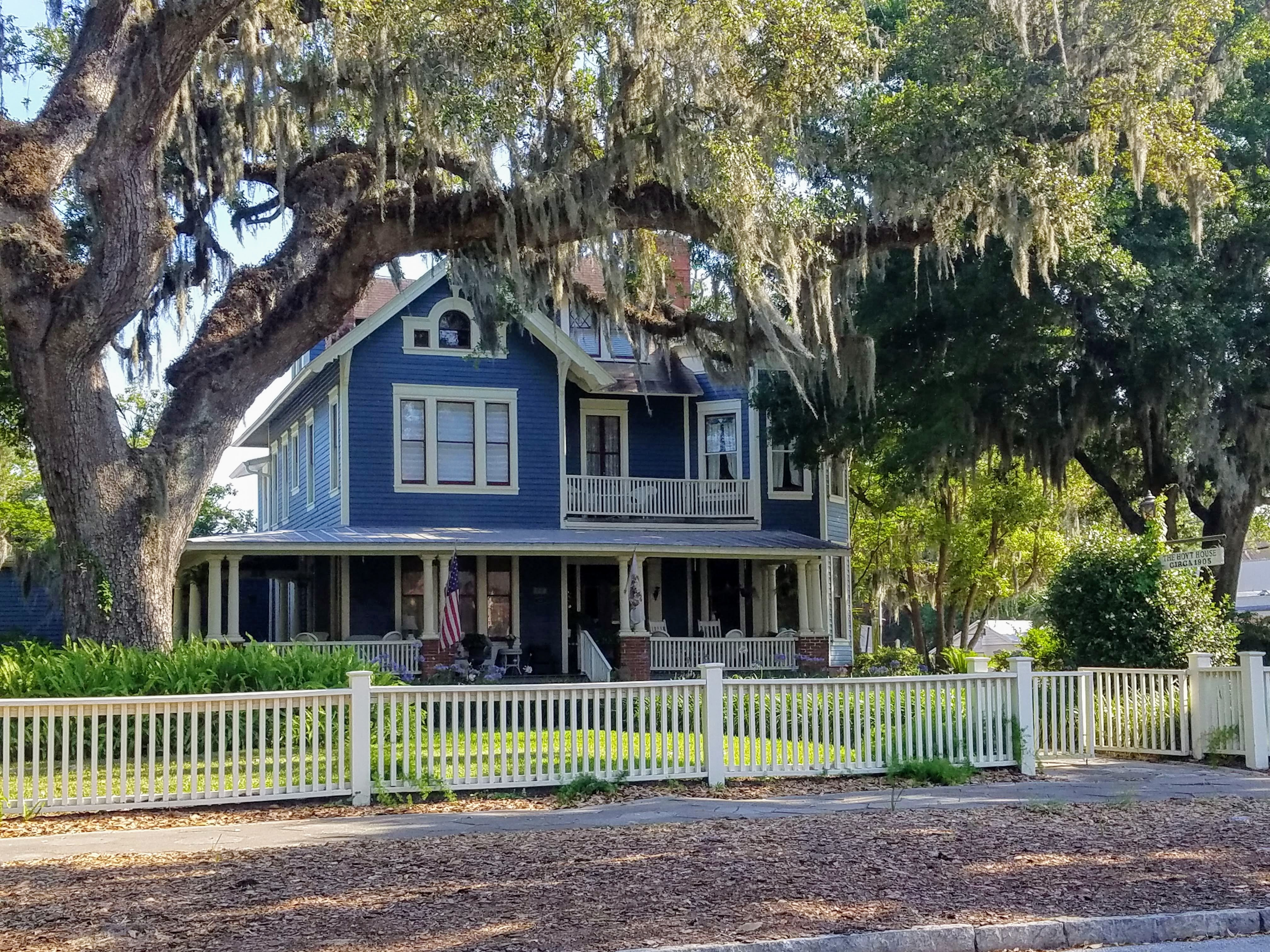
Hoyt House - May 2022

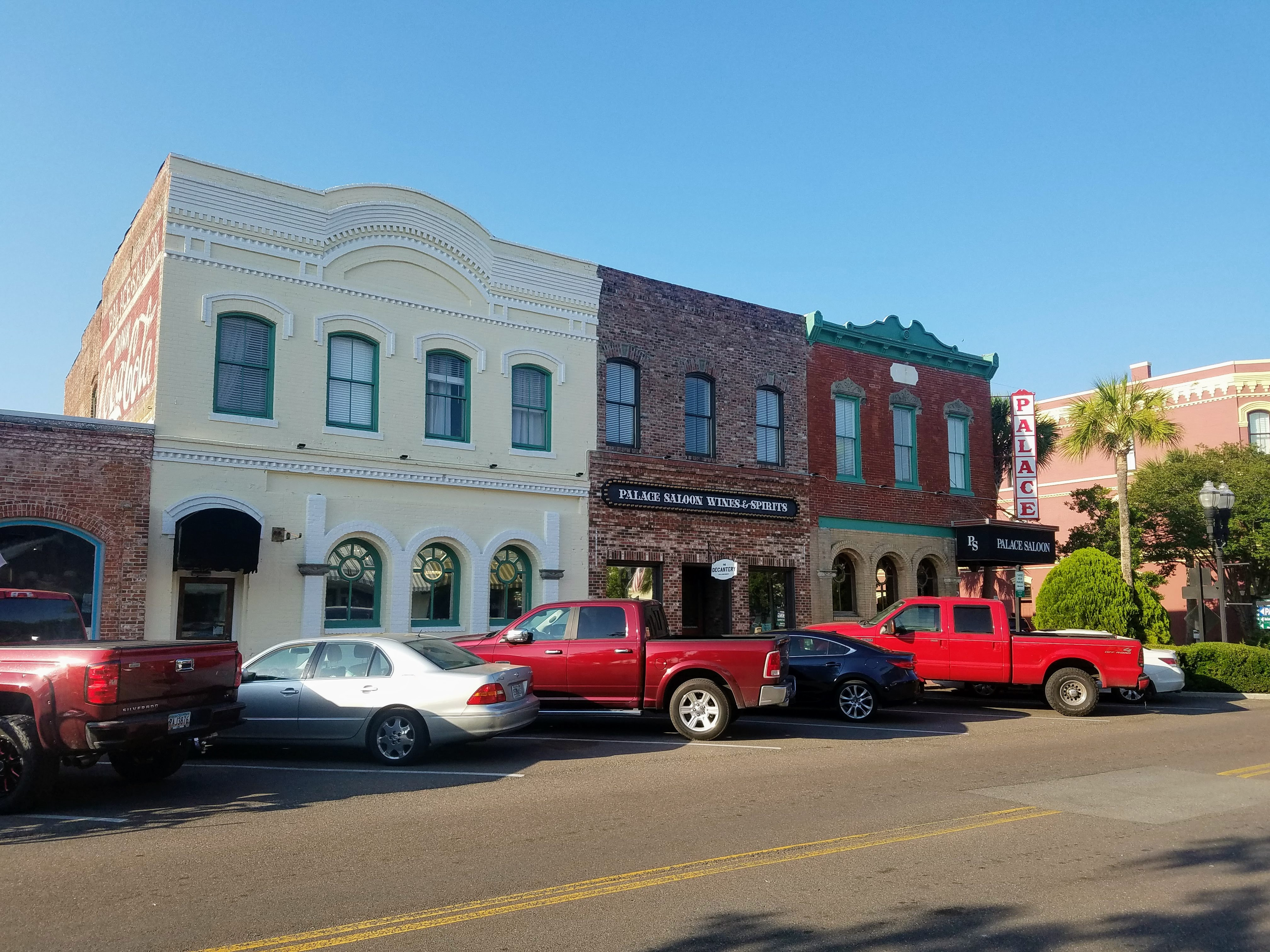
Centre Street Businesses - May 2019

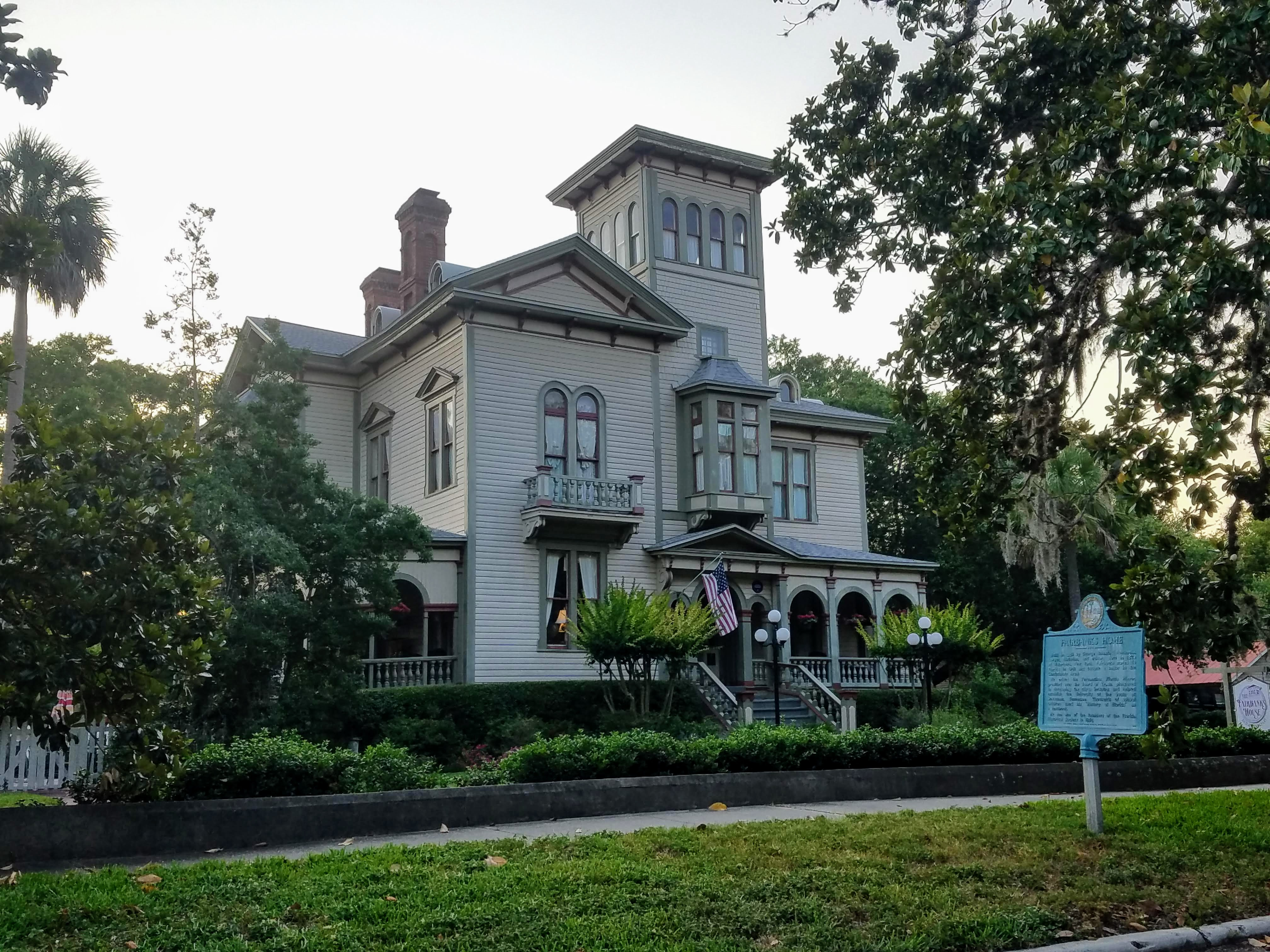
Fairbanks House - May 2019

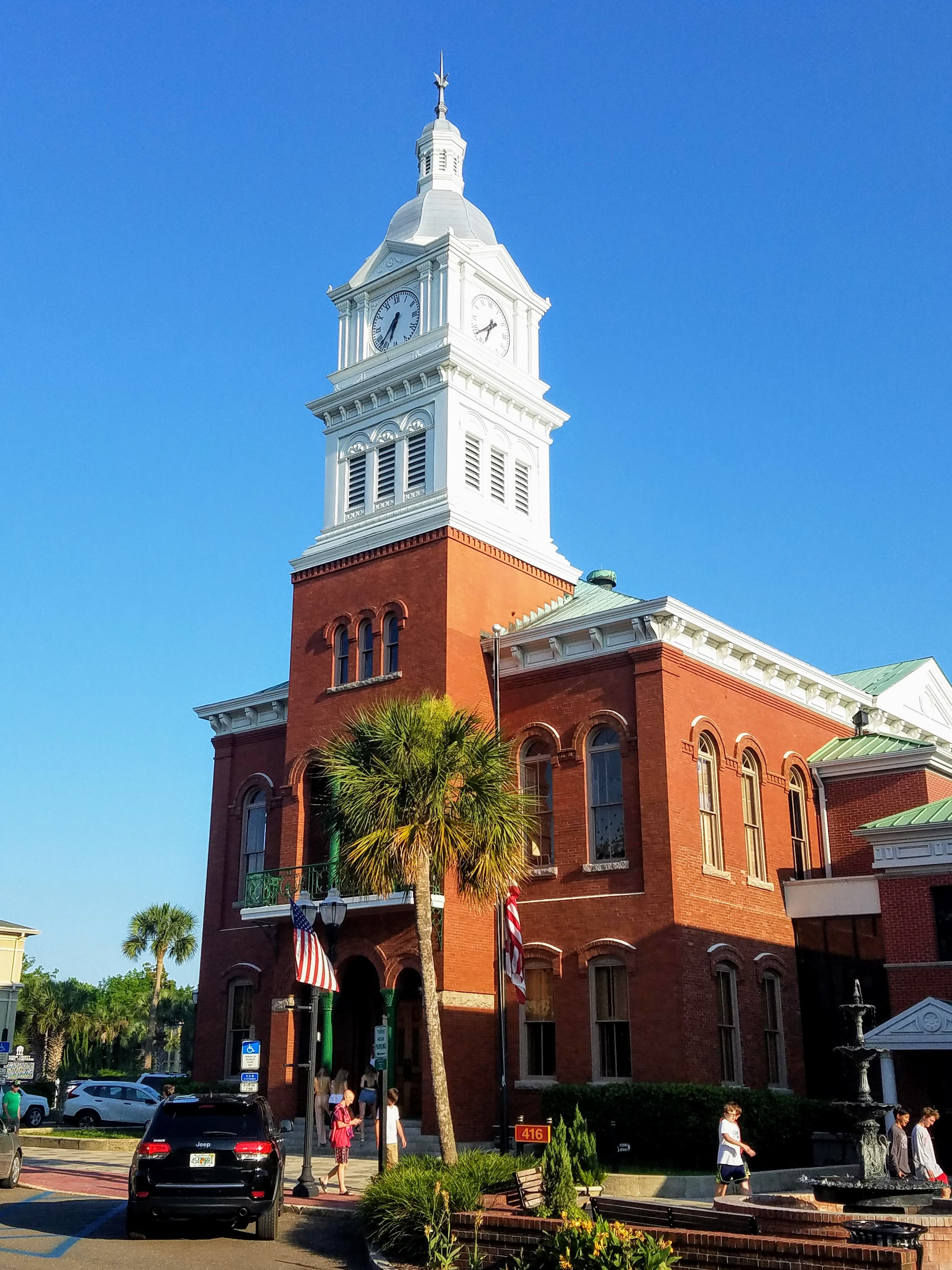
Historic Nassau County Courthouse - May 2019

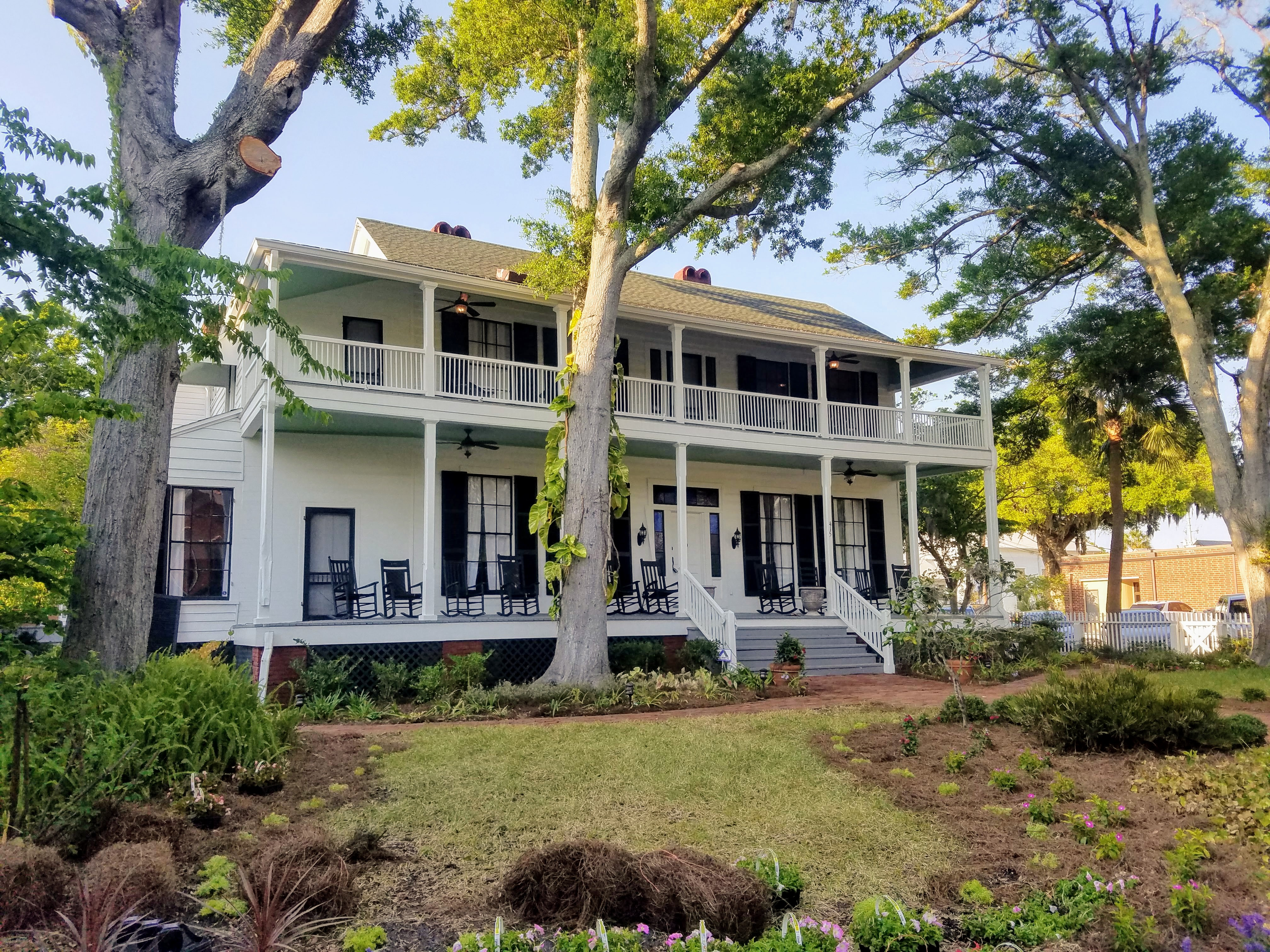
Lesesne House - May 2019

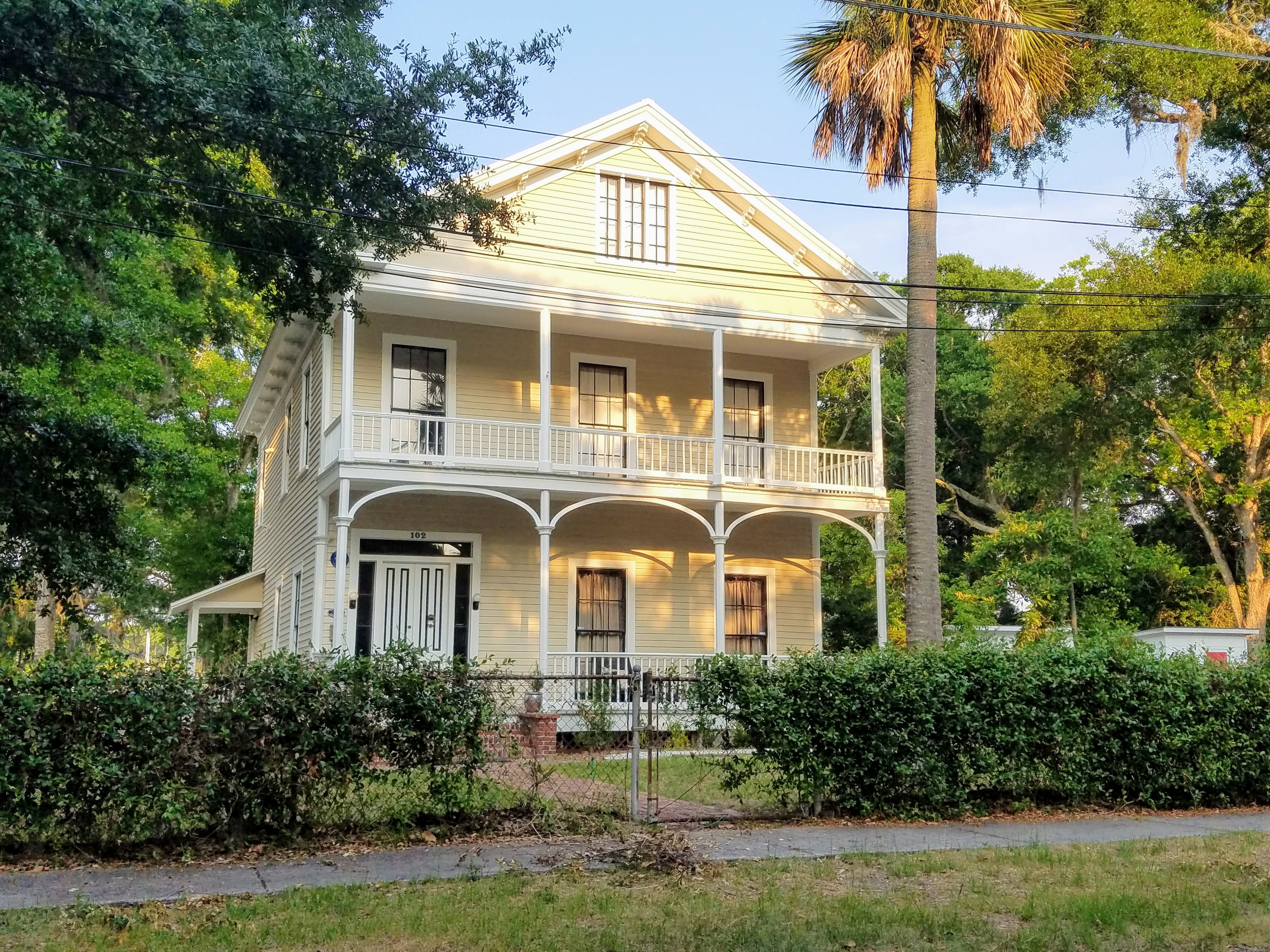
Merrick-Simmons House - May 2019

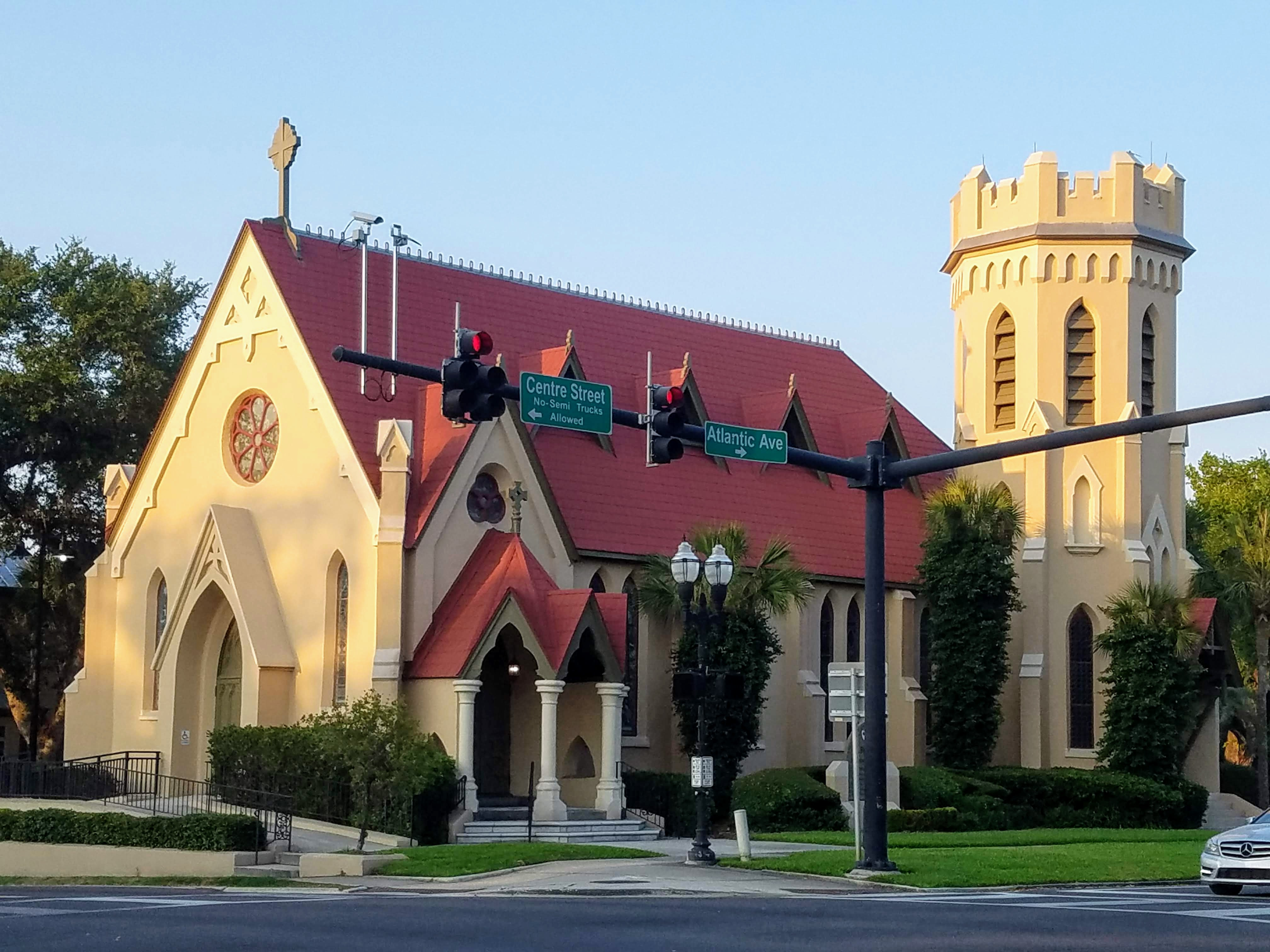
St. Peter's Episcopal Church - May 2019

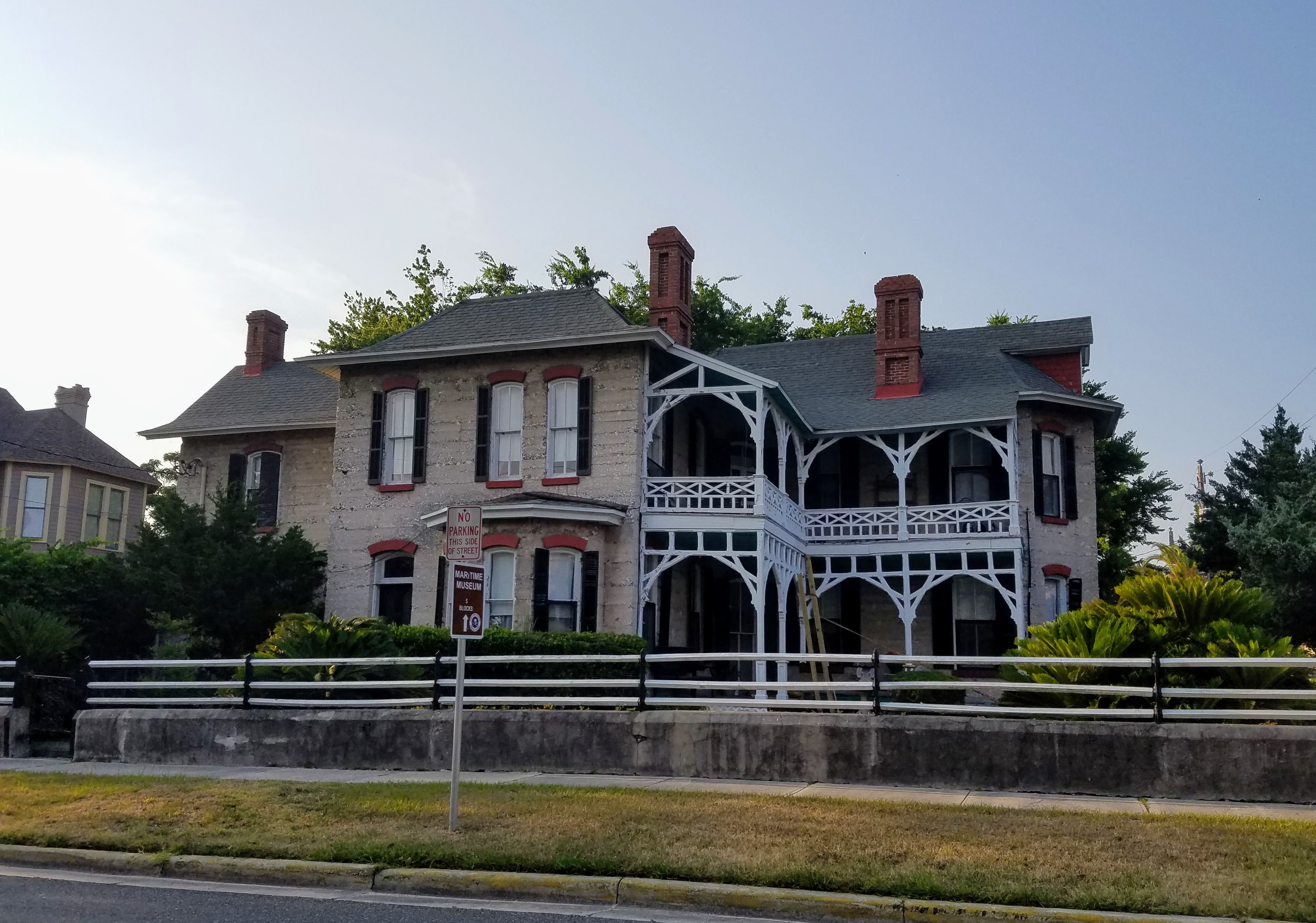
Tabby House - May 2019

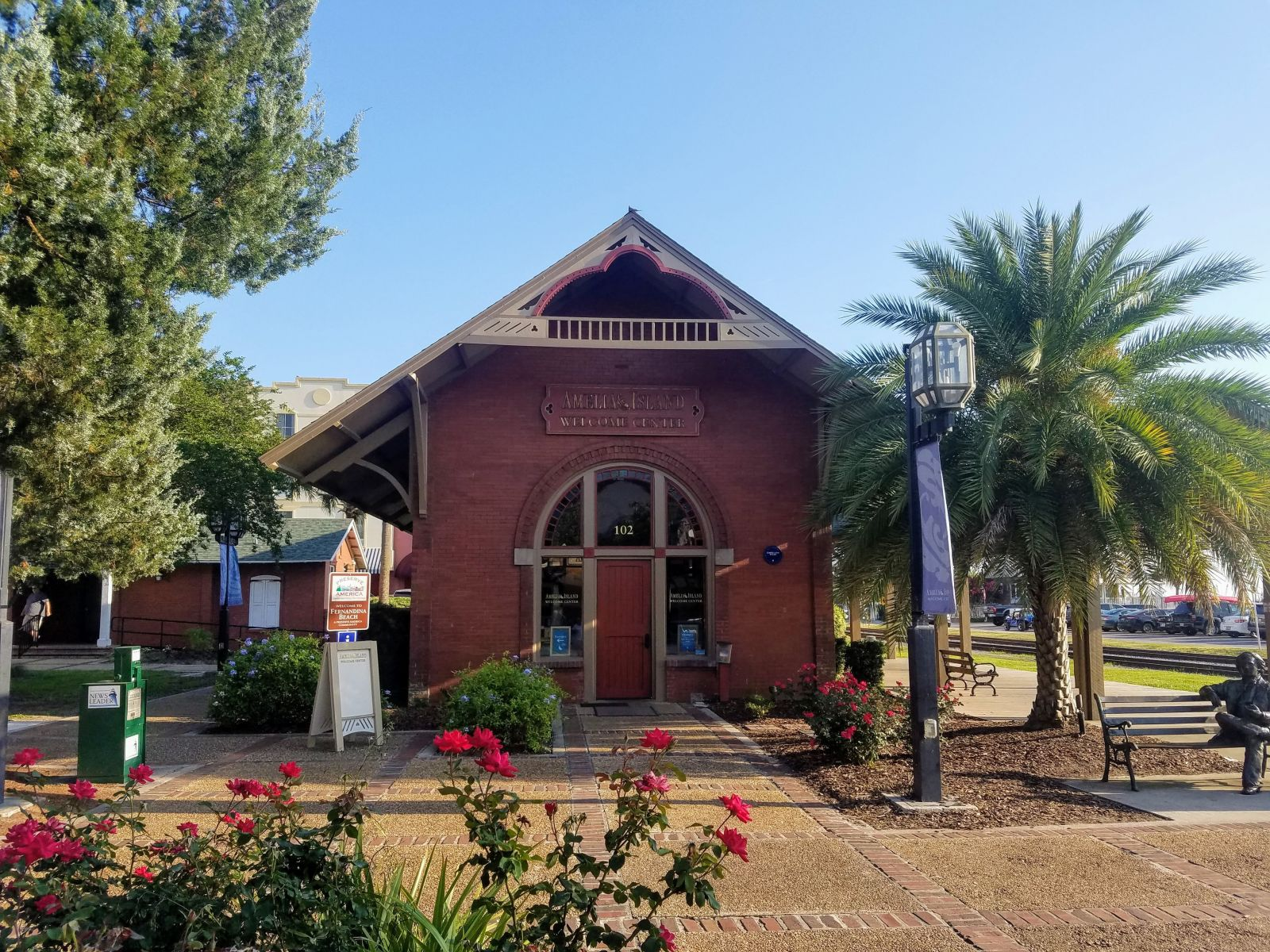
Historic Fernandina Beach Train Depot

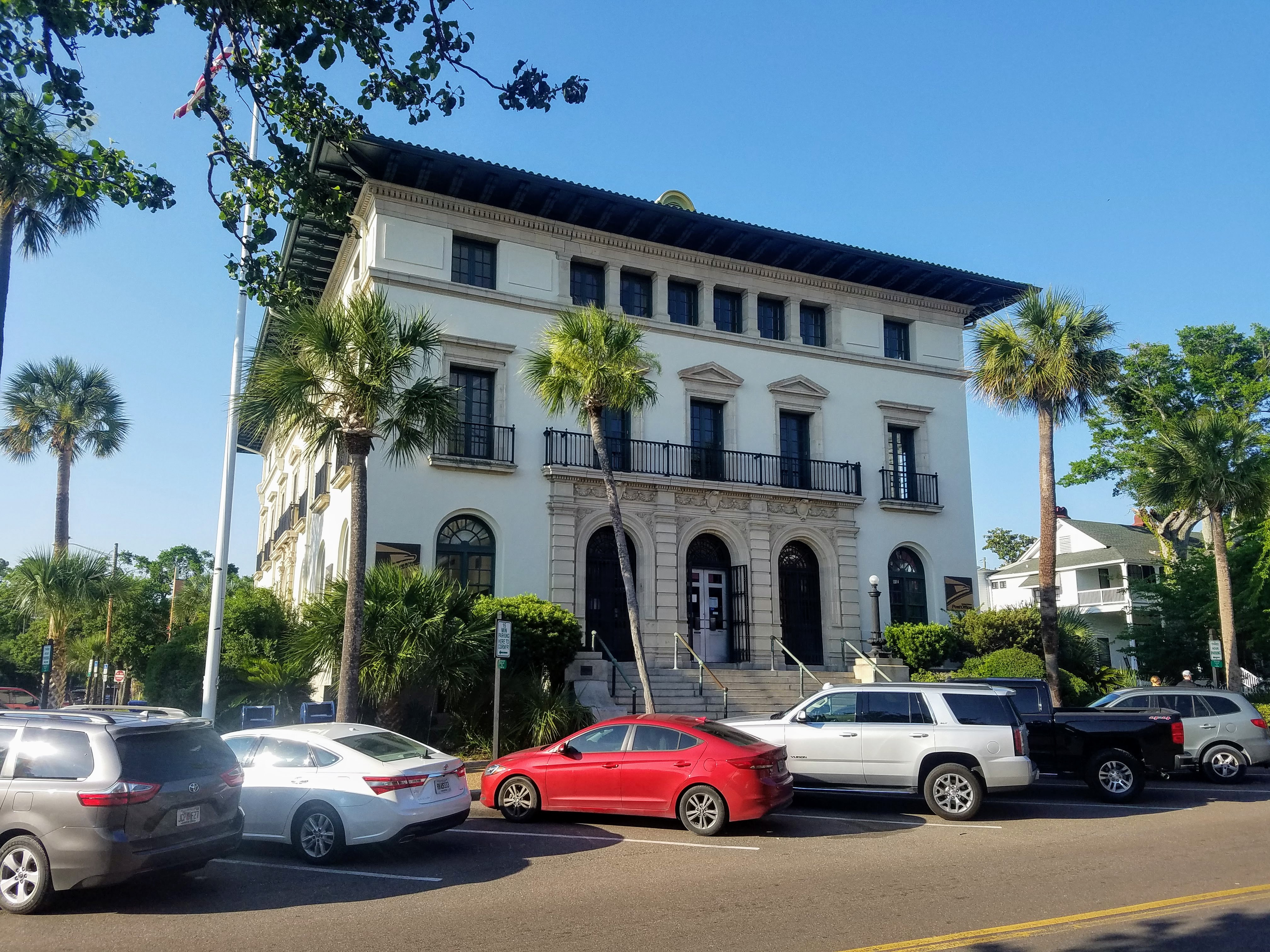
Post Office - May 2019

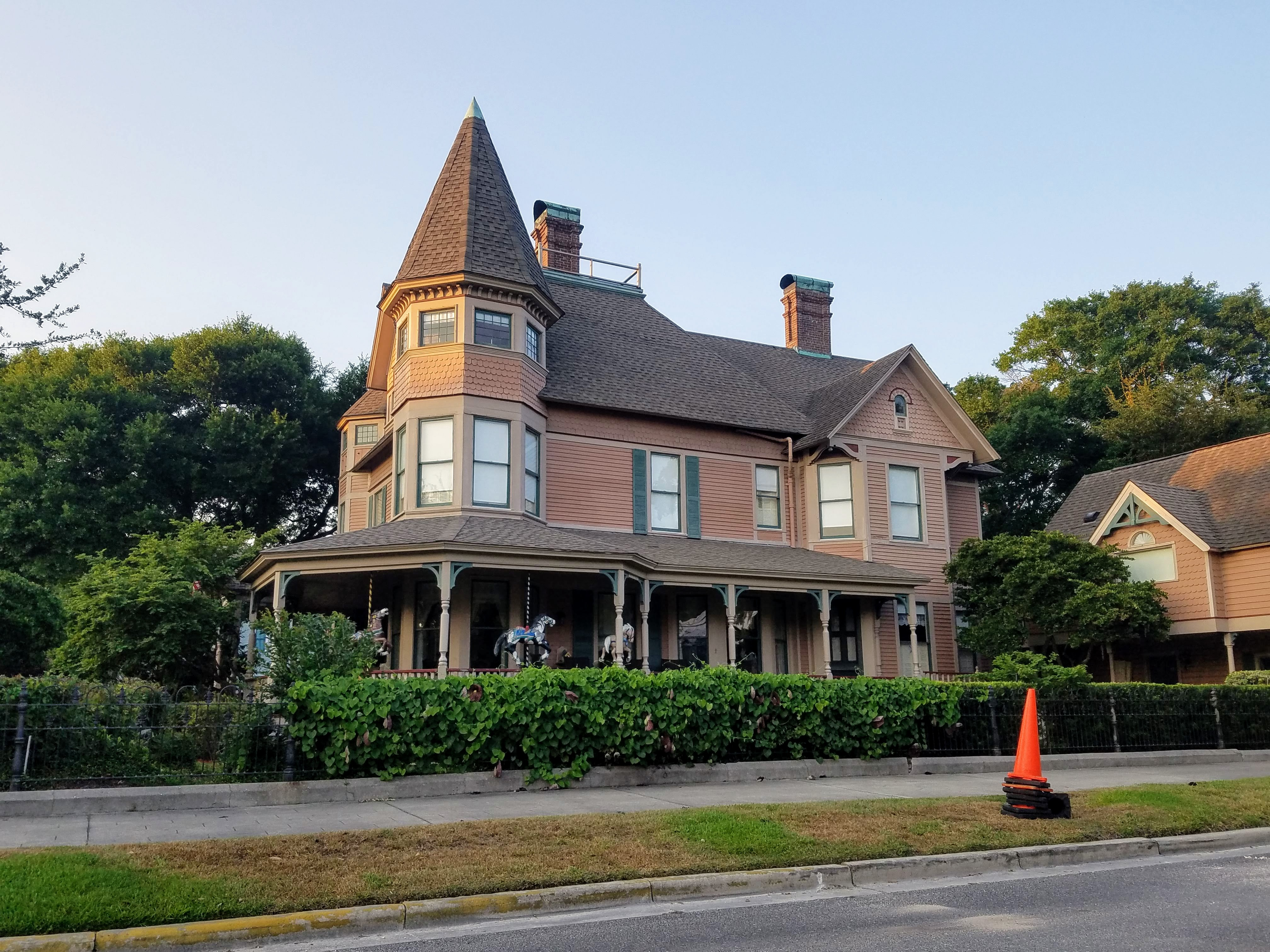
Bailey House - May 2019
