= Nassauville, Florida =

Unincorporated community in Florida, U.S.

Nassauville is an unincorporated community in Nassau County, Florida, United States. It is located on the northern bank of the Nassau River, near its northernmost bend.

The Mount Olive Missionary Baptist Church in Nassauville is listed on the National Register of Historic Places.

== Geography ==
Nassauville is located at 30°34′09″N 81°31′11″W (30.56917, -81.51972).
