= Liberty Billings =

American politician

- Born: 1823; Saco, Maine, USA
- Died: 1877 (aged 53–54)
- Military career
- Allegiance: United States
- Branch: Union Army
- Commands: 1st South Carolina Volunteer; 33rd United States Colored Infantry
- Conflicts: American Civil War

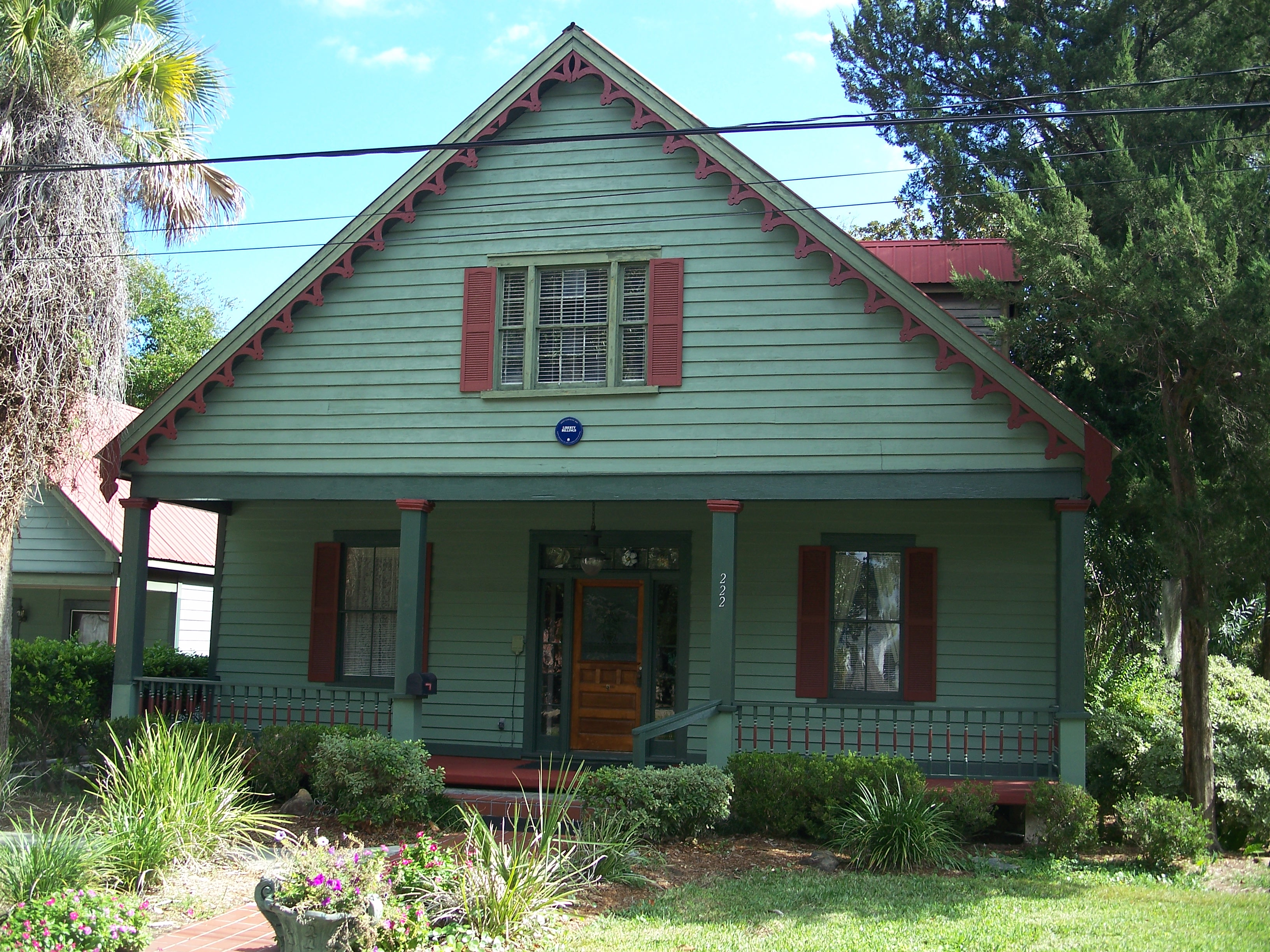
Billings House in Fernandina Beach, Florida

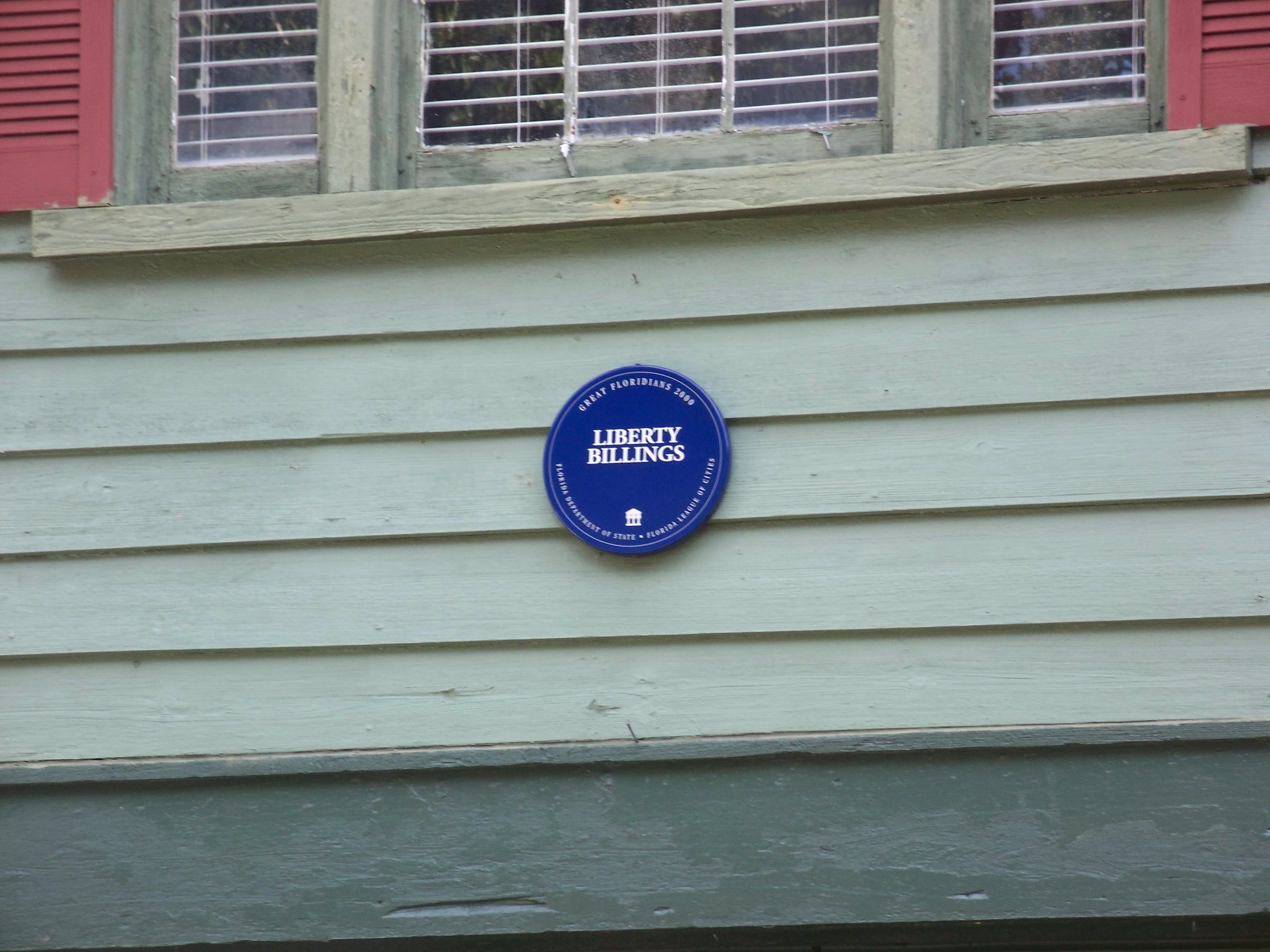
Billings Great Floridian plaque

Liberty Billings (1823–1877) was an American officer in the Union Army, a Unitarian minister, and a state senator.

Billings was born in Saco, Maine in 1823. He was educated at Thornton Academy and later graduated from Meadville Theological School in 1848.

Billings served as Lieutenant Colonel of the 1st South Carolina Volunteer Infantry which in turn became the 33rd United States Colored Infantry during the American Civil War. He was a Republican (Radical Republican) during the Reconstruction Era and served as a state senator in Florida. He was involved in the constitutional convention that developed the 1868 Florida Constitution. Billings has been honored posthumously as a Great Floridian.

He was deemed ineligible to participate in the constitutional convention and was voted out along with others accused of being residents of other states.

The Billings House is located in the Fernandina Beach Historic District in Fernandina Beach, Florida.

== See also ==
- African American officeholders from the end of the Civil War until before 1900
