= Hezekiah Palmer House =

Historic house in Connecticut, United States

- U.S. National Register of Historic Places
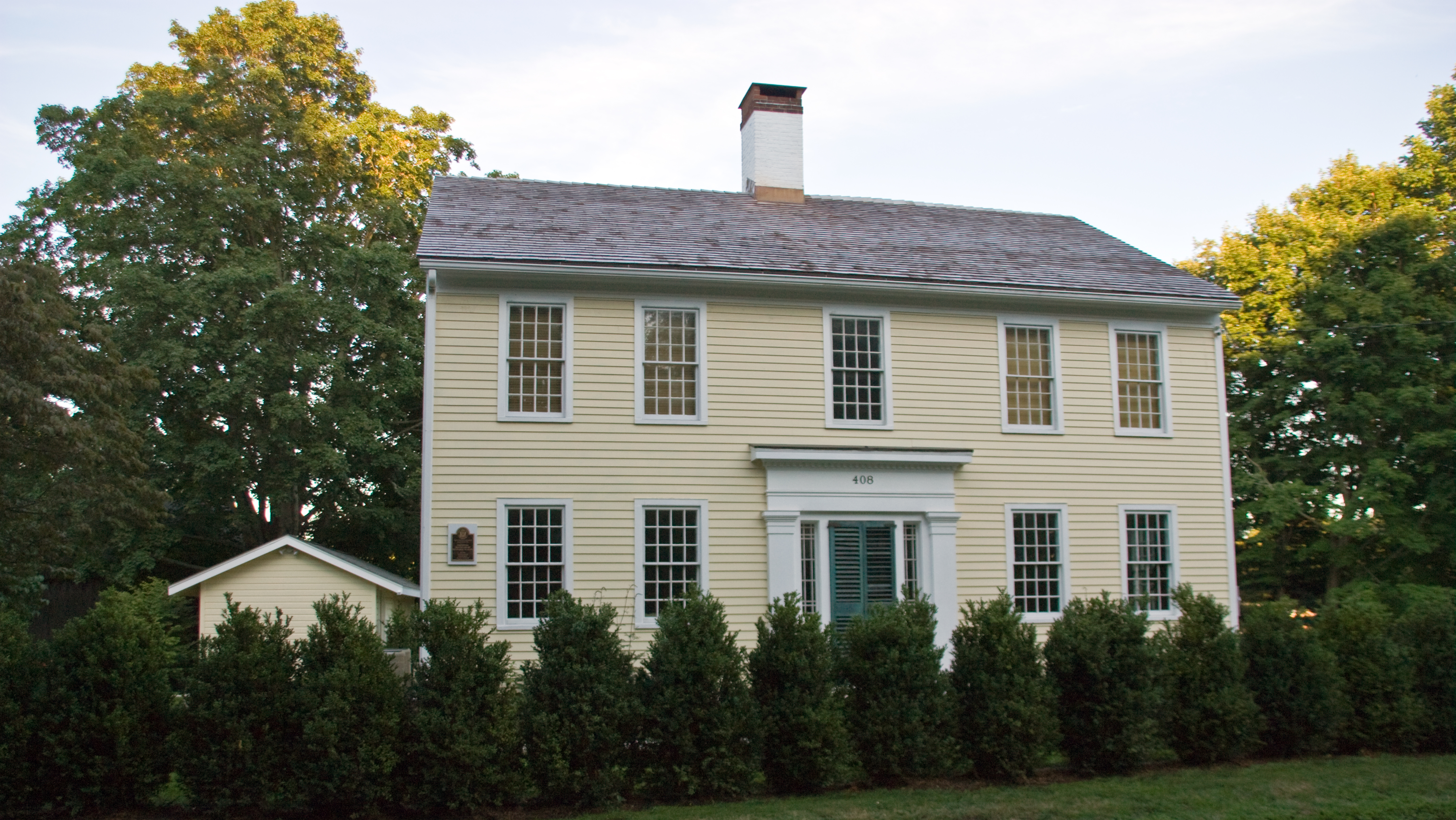
- Hezekiah Palmer House in 2008

- Location within Connecticut Location within the United States
- Location: 340-408 Leete's Island Road, Branford, Connecticut
- Coordinates: 41°16′30″N 72°45′25″W
- Area: 0.5 acres (0.20 ha)
- Built: c. 1830
- Architectural style: Greek Revival, Colonial, New England Colonial
- MPS: Colonial Houses of Branford TR
- NRHP reference No.: 88002641
- Added to NRHP: December 1, 1988

The Hezekiah Palmer House is historic house at 340-408 Leete's Island Road in Branford, Connecticut. Probably built in the early 19th century, it is an uncommonly late example in the town of colonial Georgian architecture. The house was listed on the National Register of Historic Places on December 1, 1988.

== Description and history ==
The Hezekiah Palmer House is located in eastern Branford village of Stony Creek, on the east side of Leete's Island Road just north of its junction with Stony Brook Road and Thimble Island Road. It is a 2 1/2-story wood-frame structure, with a side-gable roof, large central chimney, and clapboarded exterior. It has a rear leanto section giving it a classic New England saltbox appearance. The main facade is five bays wide, with sash windows arranged symmetrically around the entrance. The main entrance is framed by sidelight windows and pilasters, which support an entablature with cornice.

The house has traditionally been given a construction date of 1830, based on the carving of that number on one of its main beams. Land records suggest that it was built sometime before 1830 by James Palmer, whose son Hezekiah is recorded as its owner in 1852. Its transitional Colonial/Greek Revival styling and construction methods suggest an earlier date.

== See also ==
- National Register of Historic Places listings in New Haven County, Connecticut
