= Mount Olive Missionary Baptist Church (Nassauville, Florida) =

Historic church in Florida, United States

- U.S. National Register of Historic Places
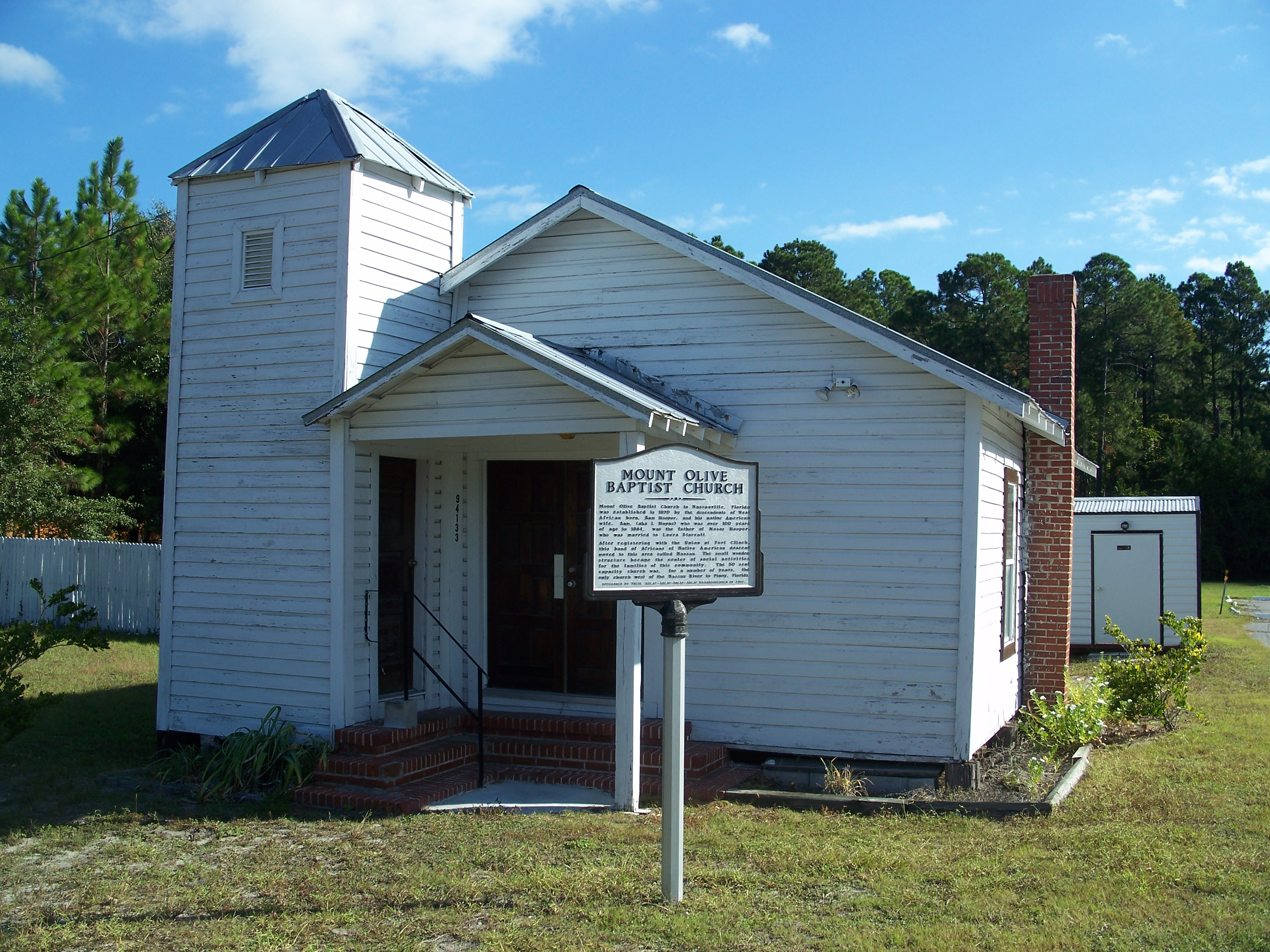

- Location within Florida Location within the United States
- Location: Nassauville, Florida
- Coordinates: 30°34′42″N 81°31′8″W
- NRHP reference No.: 98001099
- Added to NRHP: August 28, 1998

The Mount Olive Missionary Baptist Church is a historic site in Nassauville, Florida. It is located on County Road 107. On August 28, 1998, it was added to the U.S. National Register of Historic Places.
