= Isaac Palmer House =

Historic house in Connecticut, United States

- U.S. National Register of Historic Places
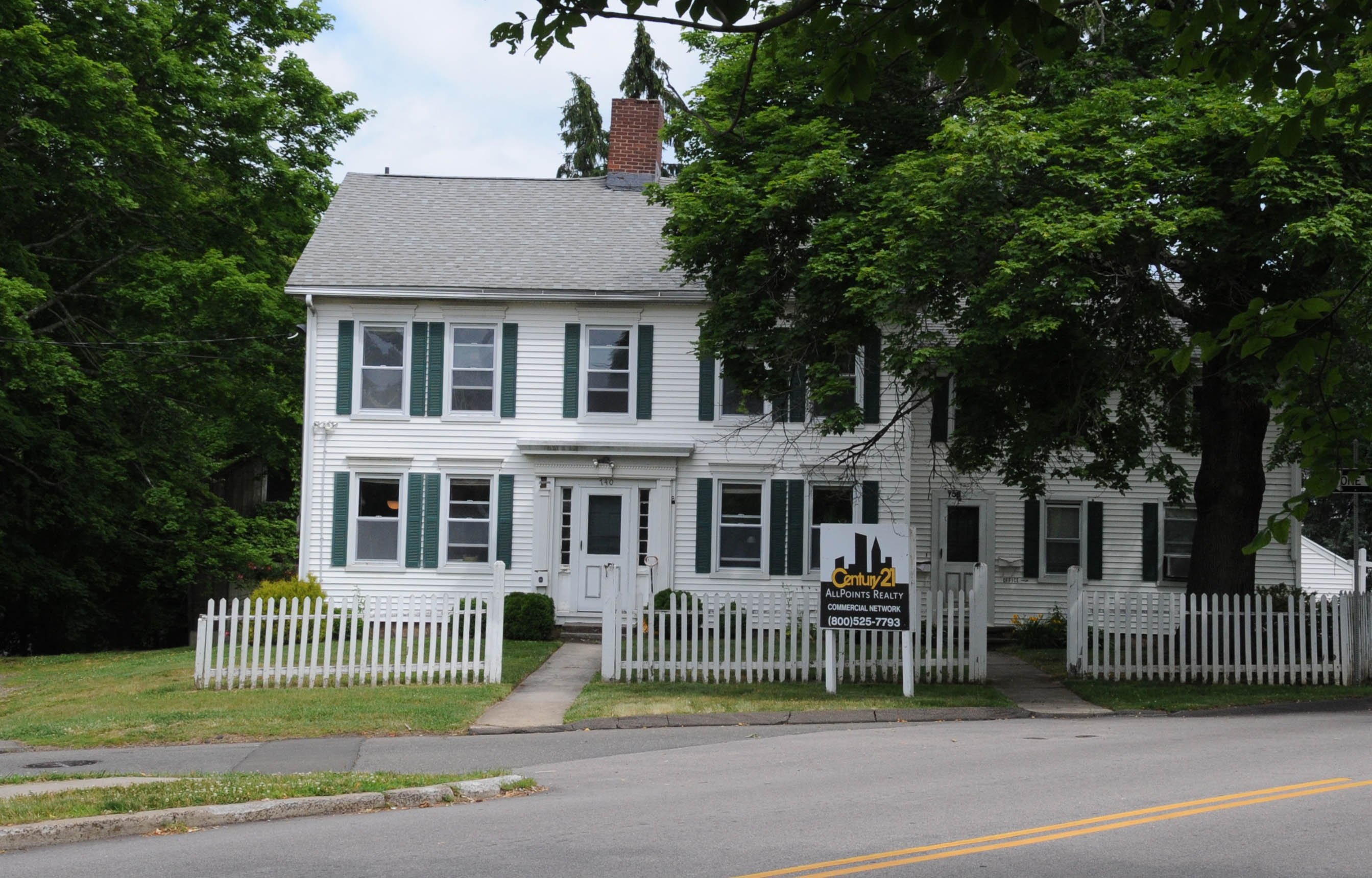

- Location within Connecticut Location within the United States
- Location: 736–756 Main Street, Branford, Connecticut
- Coordinates: 41°16′47″N 72°48′57″W
- Area: 0.6 acres (0.24 ha)
- Built: 1810
- Built by: Robinson, Linus
- Architectural style: Federal
- MPS: Colonial Houses of Branford TR
- NRHP reference No.: 88002643
- Added to NRHP: December 1, 1988

The Isaac Palmer House is a historic house at 736–756 Main Street in Branford, Connecticut, USA. Built about 1810, it is a good local example Federal period architecture. It was listed on the National Register of Historic Places in 1988.

== Description and history ==
The Isaac Palmer House is located west of downtown Branford, on the north side of Main Street at its junction with Cedar Street. It is a 2 1/2-story wood-frame structure, with a side-gable roof and clapboarded exterior. It originally had a central chimney, which is no longer visible above the roof line. The main facade is five bays wide, with sash windows arranged symmetrically around the center entrance, each with a projecting cornice. The entrance is flanked by sidelight windows and wide Doric pilasters, and is topped by an entablature and projecting cornice. A two-story ell extends to the right of the main block, and a 20th-century garage is located at the rear of the property.

The house was built about 1810, probably by Linus Robinson shortly before he sold it to John Hobart and Edmund Palmer. It remained in the Palmer family through most of the 19th century and has since been subdivided into two units.

== See also ==
- National Register of Historic Places listings in New Haven County, Connecticut
