= Bailey House (Fernandina Beach, Florida) =

Historic house in Florida, United States

- U.S. National Register of Historic Places
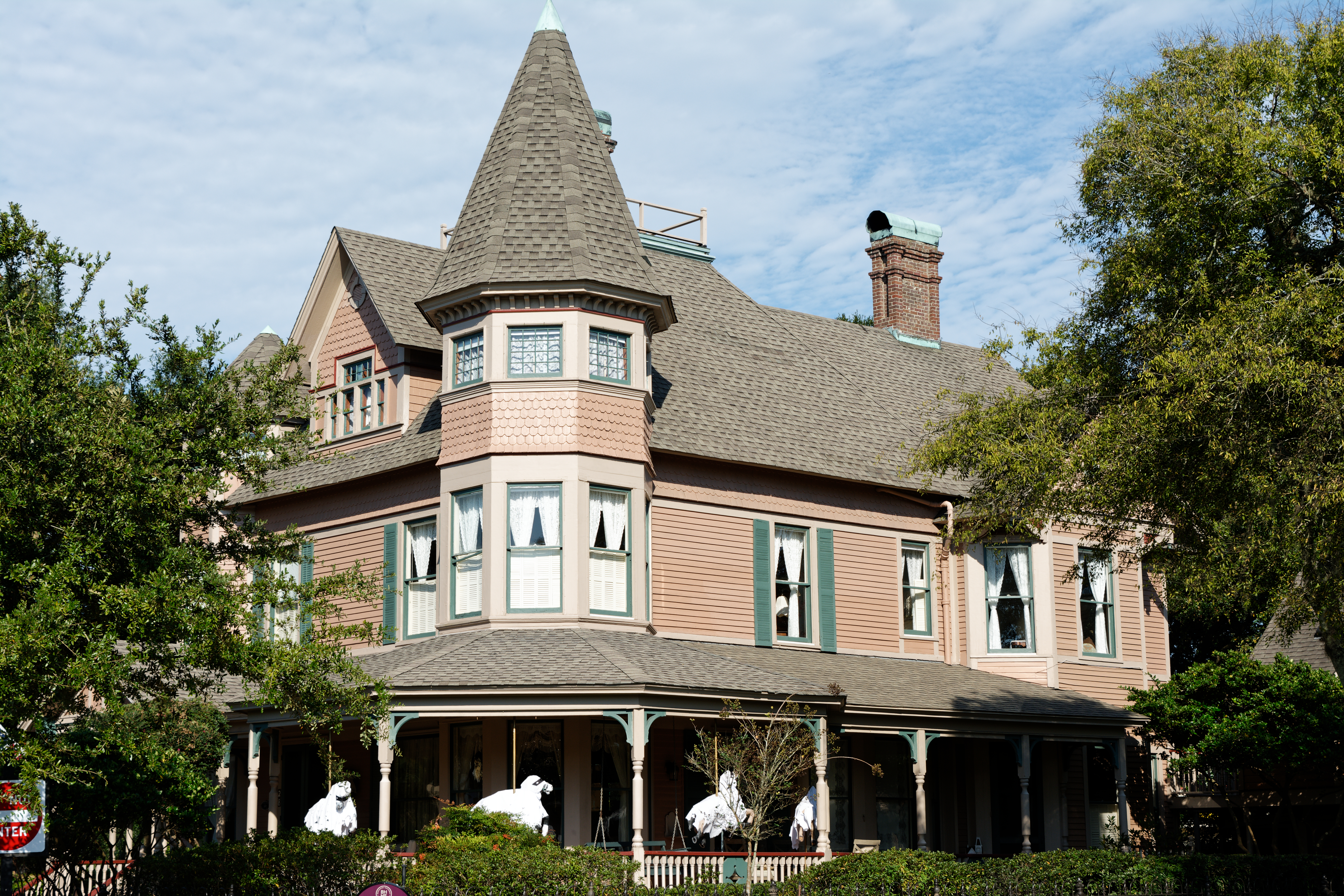

- Location within Florida Location within the United States
- Location: 7th and Ash Sts., Fernandina Beach, Florida
- Coordinates: 30.66974°N 81.45958°W
- Area: 0.5 acres (0.20 ha)
- Built: 1895
- Architect: George Franklin Barber
- Architectural style: Late Victorian
- NRHP reference No.: 73000591
- Added to NRHP: June 4, 1973

The Bailey House is a historic site in Fernandina Beach, Florida. It was built about 1895 and is located at 28 South 7th Street. On June 4, 1973, it was added to the U.S. National Register of Historic Places.

The house was built by or for Mr. E.W. Bailey. It was designed by the firm of architect George Franklin Barber and is Late Victorian in style.

The house is built of yellow heart pine and rests on brick piers. It has three-story turreted bays at the two corners of its front facade. It has wide-eaved porches on its south and east sides. It It has fish-scale shingles covering its gables, its front dormer, and part of the larger turret.

== See also ==
- List of George Franklin Barber works
