= Amelia Island Museum of History =

History museum in Fernandina Beach, Florida, U.S.

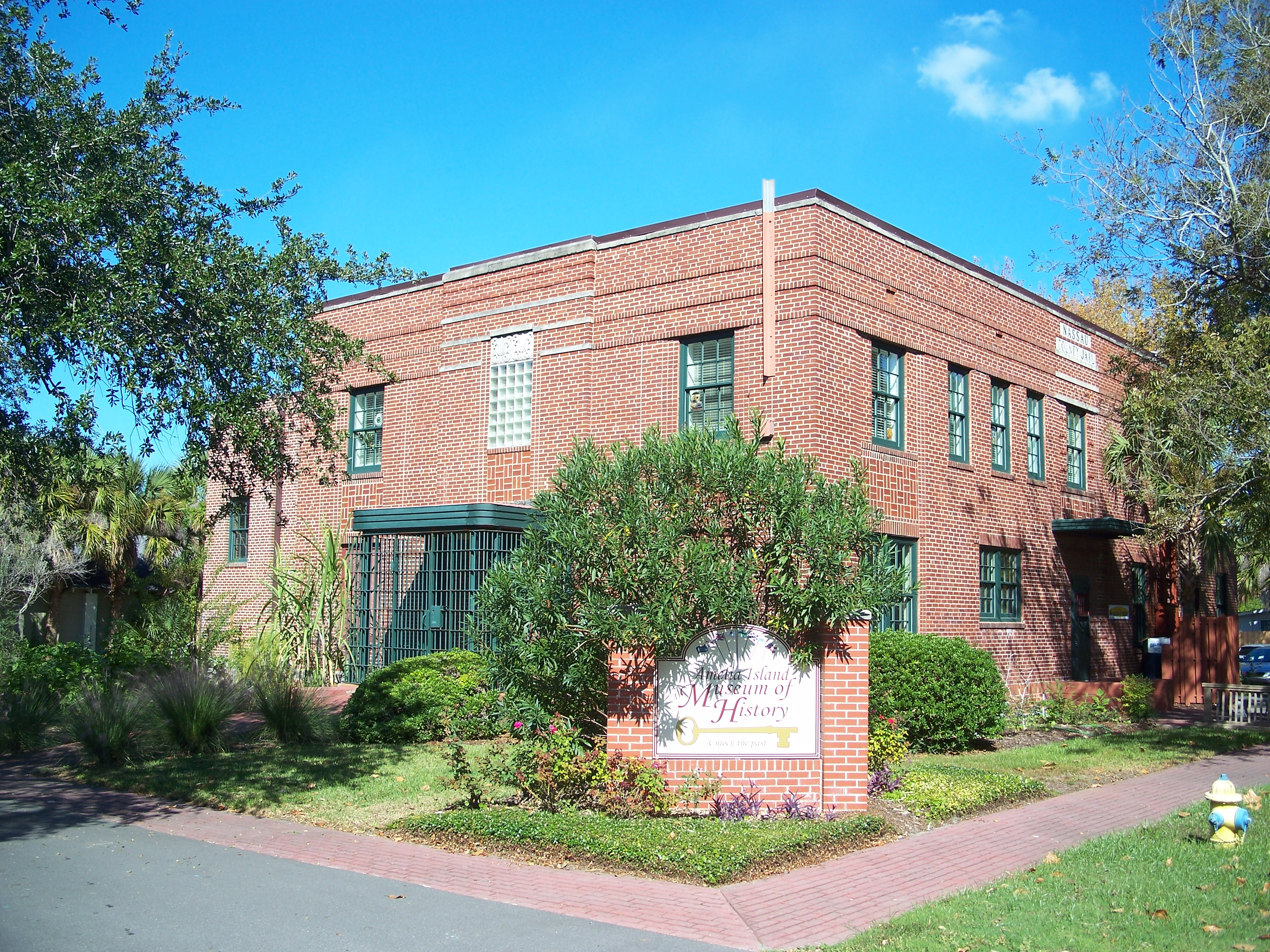

- Location within Florida
- Location: 233 South Third Street; Fernandina Beach, Florida
- Coordinates: 30.66765°N 81.46378°W
- Type: Archaeology, Culture, History, Library
- Website: Amelia Island Museum of History
- Nassau County Jail
- U.S. National Register of Historic Places
- Area: 1 acre (0 ha)
- Built: 1938
- Architect: Roy A. Benjamin
- Architectural style: Moderne
- NRHP reference No.: 09000927
- Added to NRHP: November 18, 2009

The Amelia Island Museum of History is located at 233 South Third Street, Fernandina Beach, Florida. It houses exhibits focusing on the history of Nassau County, Florida and is situated inside the old Nassau county jail. The idea of the museum was first put forward in 1975 by the Duncan Lamont Clinch (DLC) Historical Society. This group formed a committee in hopes of creating a museum that would display items and artifacts related to the history of Amelia Island. During this time period resident William Decker, was collecting thousands of documents and artifacts related to the local history. When he passed this collection was then left to his son Doug, who wanted to be able to share his father’s work with the community. In 1977 a board of trustees was created from the original DLC committee that then formed the non-profit cultural institution called the “Fernandina Historical Museum. Through various fundraising activities the group lobbied the City of Fernandina Beach to purchase a portion of materials from the Decker collection. These materials were then donated to the museum group and housed in their first location, an old schoolhouse on Atlantic Avenue.

The second location of this local museum was an old railroad depot that was donated by the CSX railroad company. In 1978 the depot became the dual residence of the Chamber of Commerce and the Museum. Items from the Decker Collection were put on permanent display along with traveling exhibits from the Smithsonian, Ft. Clinch, and George Davis Collection of historic photos. While this location served for the time being the trustees continued to look for a location all their own. When Nassau County built another jail in 1979 the Museum spoke to the county about taking possession of the old jail location. The county offered the Museum a 99 year lease at $1 per year. While the old jail location was in dire shape, volunteers worked to repair the space to a functional capacity. This new location then became known as the “Eight Flags Museum” after the creation of a contest within local schools. The first director of this new museum was Dorothy Groshell. In 1982 an additional space was cleared for the Victorian-era collection items and a new multi-media room.

The direction of the museum changed somewhat in 1984 as it established a partnership with the Northeast Florida Railway Society and was renamed the “Florida Museum of Transportation and History”. The aim of this new direction was to distinguish the museum within the state and increase interest. However after only a year the museum saw that this theme was no longer drawing attendance and sought another direction. A volunteer by the name Deon Jaccard was responsible for the next phase of the museum’s life when they developed a ‘Spoken History’ program for the community and trained other volunteers to become tour guides for the museum and other district walking tours. At this time the museum came to be known by its current name “The Amelia Island Museum of History”. In 2003 the building completed a half million dollar update including the addition of an archive and research area on the second floor. The museum houses more than 11,000 artifacts, photographs, books, and other archival materials. The research library is open on Tuesday and Thursday, 10am-4pm or by appointment with the museum's archivist. Later in 2018 the museum underwent another renovation on the first floor that housed many of the museum’s permanent exhibits. Care was also given to balance the historical narratives presenting the history of Nassau County. The building was added to the National Register of Historic Places on November 18, 2009.

The museum has docent-led tours Monday-Saturday at 11am and 2pm, and Sunday at 2pm. These tours are included with the purchase of a ticket.

== Photos ==
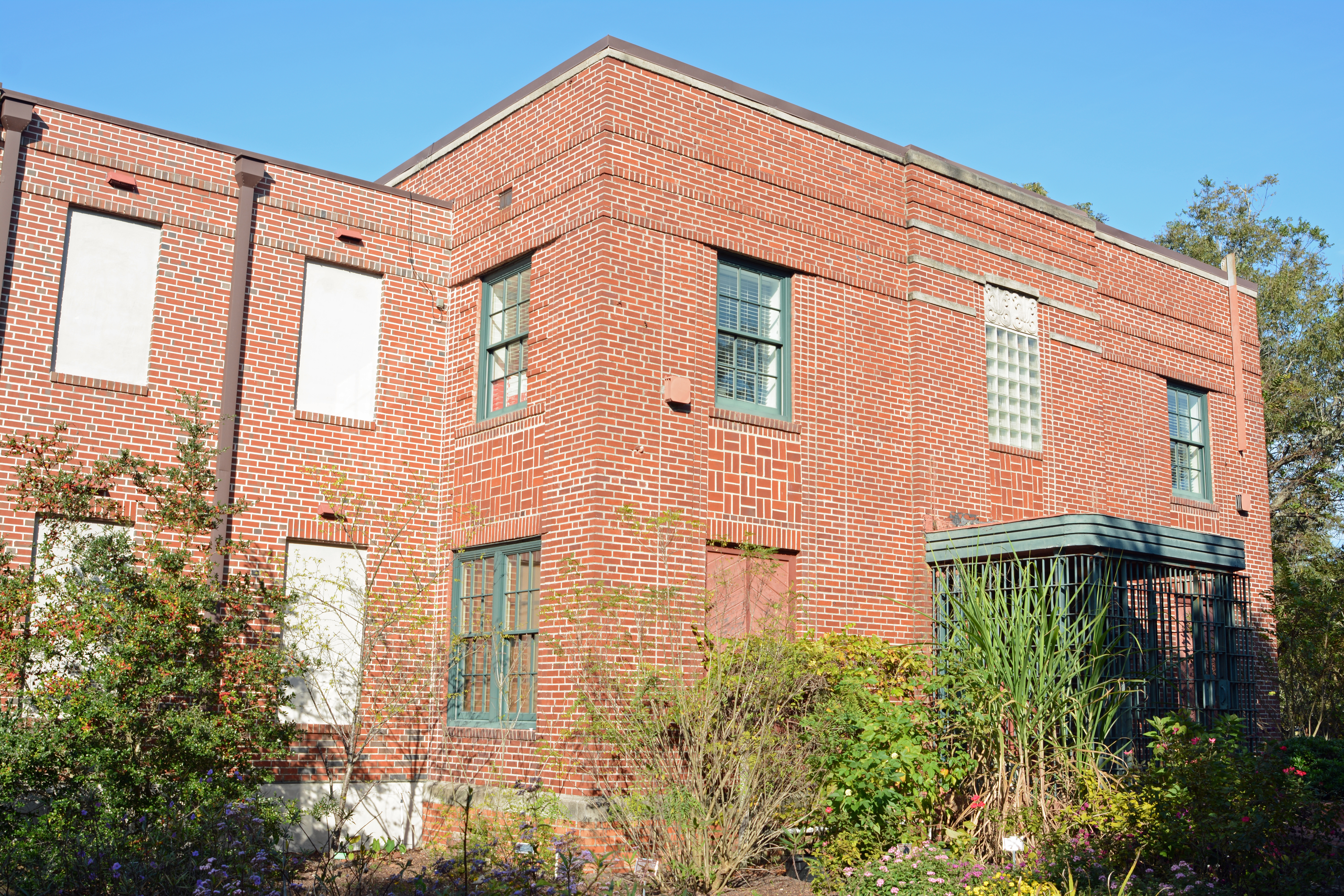
Corner view

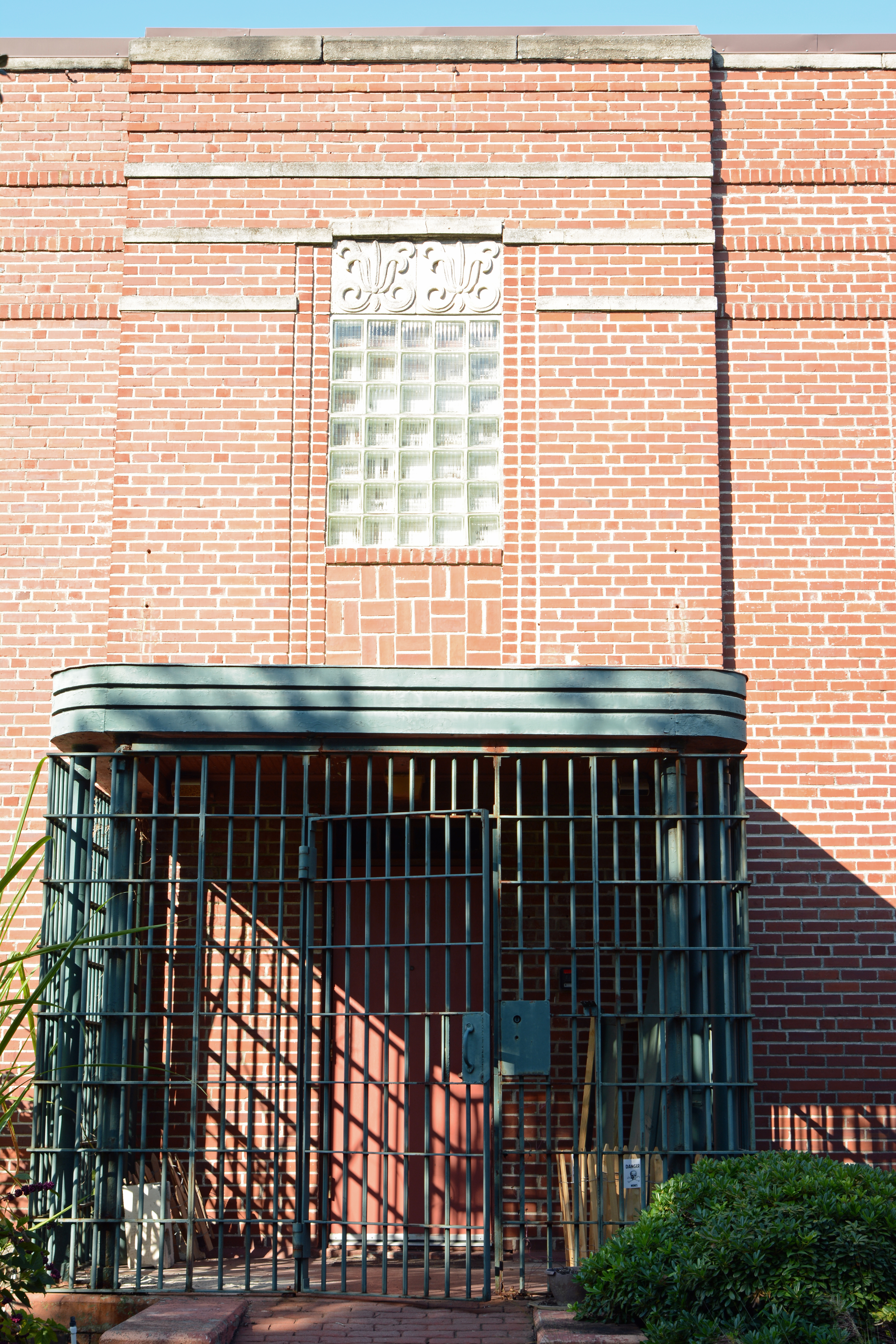
Secure jail door

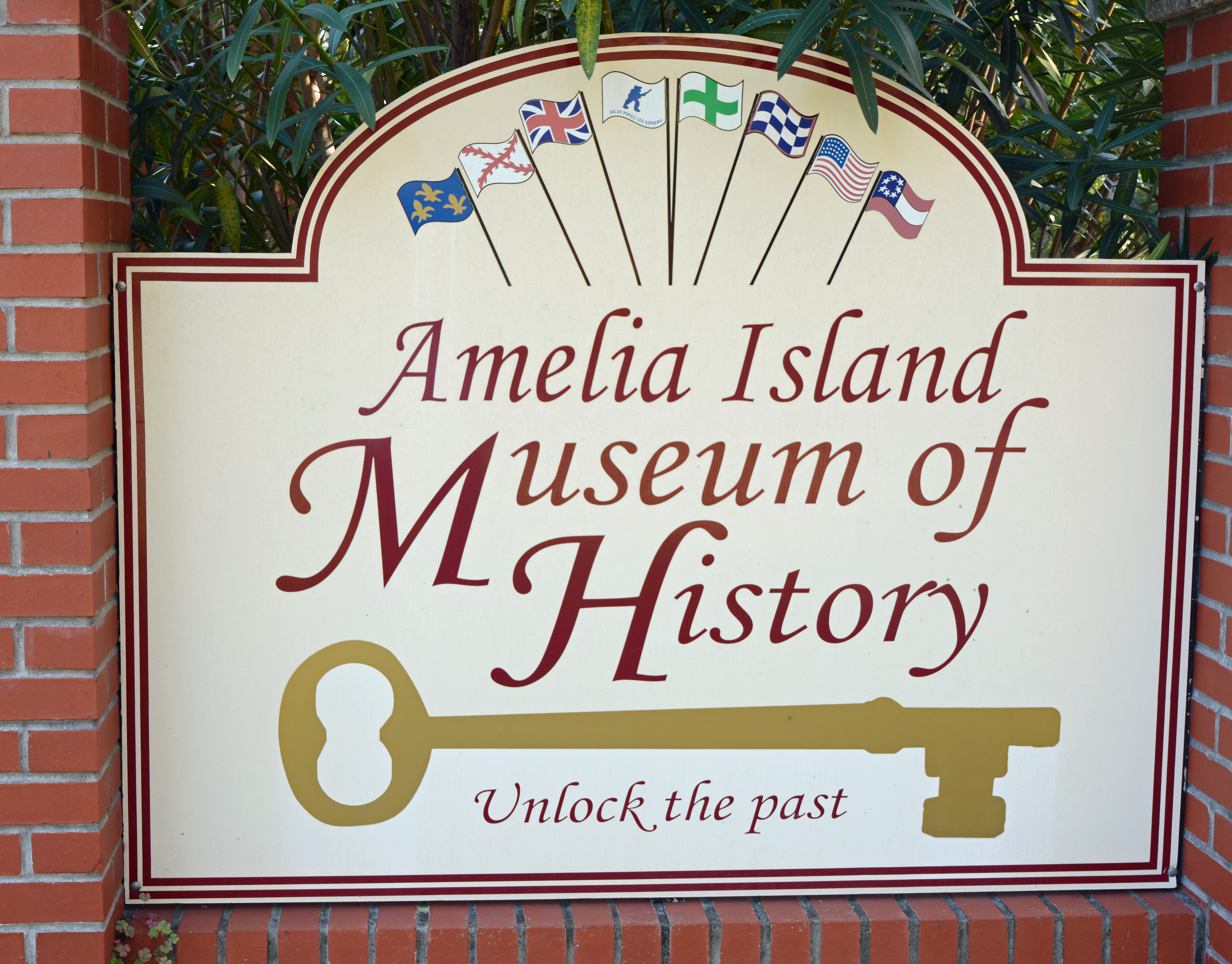
Sign

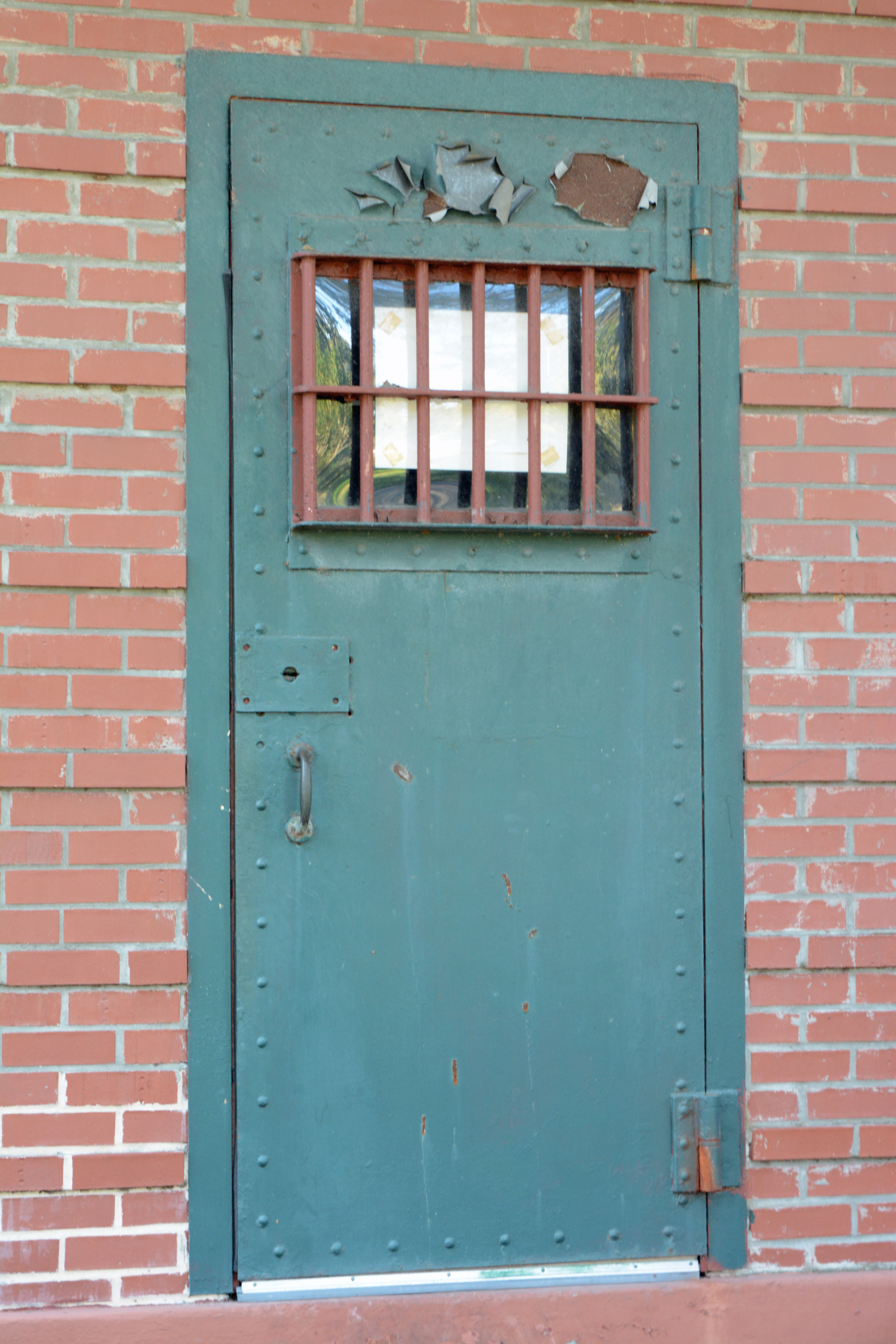
Side door
