= John Palmer House (Lisbon, Connecticut) =

Historic house in Connecticut, United States

- U.S. National Register of Historic Places
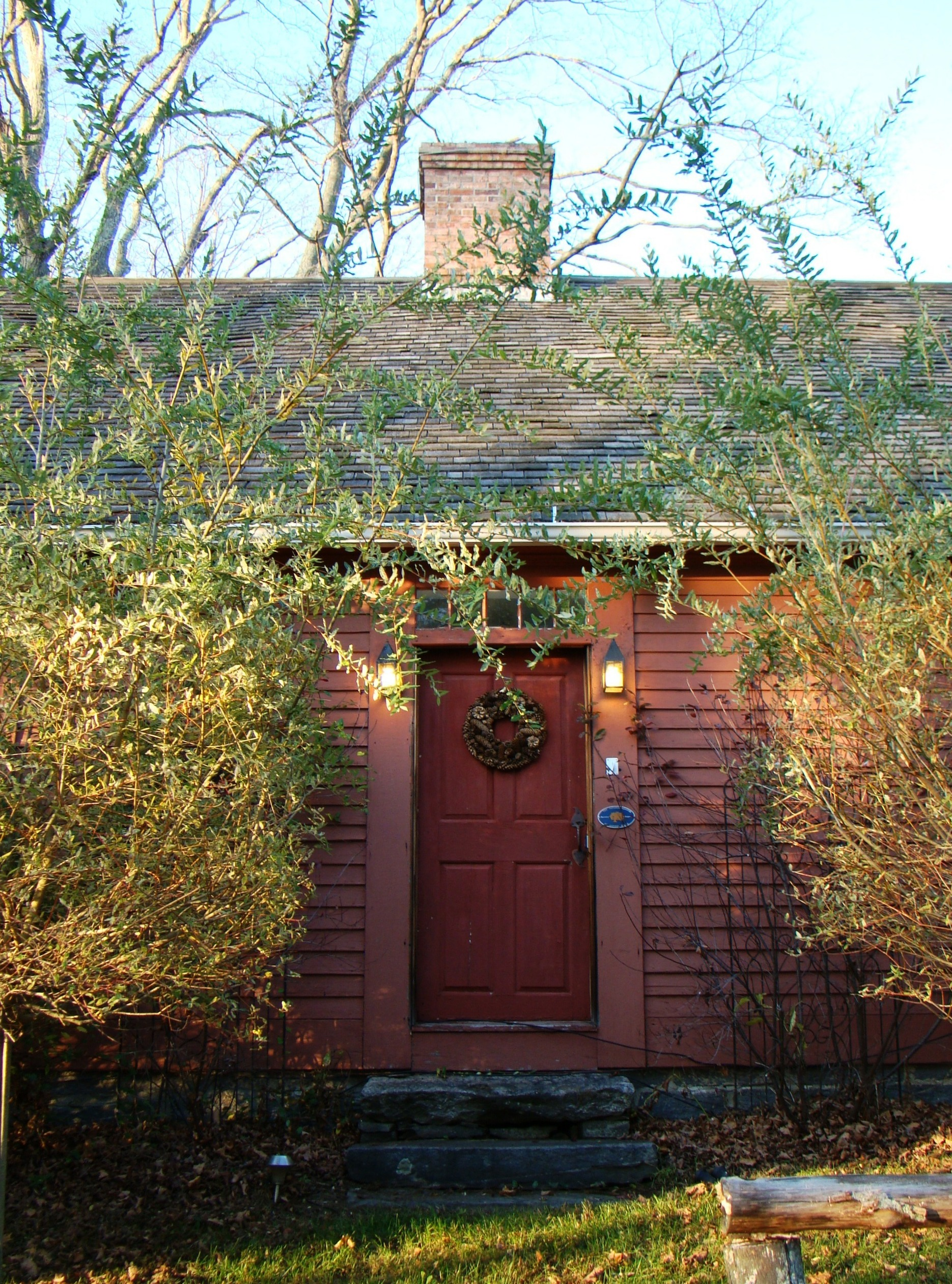

- Location within Connecticut Location within the United States
- Location: 291 North Burnham Highway, Lisbon, Connecticut
- Coordinates: 41°20′34″N 71°54′28″W
- Area: 38 acres (15 ha)
- Built: 1790
- Built by: John Palmer
- Architectural style: Colonial
- NRHP reference No.: 04001461
- Added to NRHP: January 12, 2005

The John Palmer House is a historic house at 291 North Burnham Highway in Lisbon, Connecticut. Built in 1790, it is a well-preserved example of an 18th-century Cape style farmhouse. It was listed on the National Register of Historic Places in 2005.

== Description and history ==
The John Palmer House is located in a rural setting of northern Lisbon, on the west side of North Burnham Highway (Connecticut Route 169) at its junction with Ross Hill Road. The house is set on 38 acres (15 ha) of land, and is set back a modest distance from the road, from which it separated by a stone wall and mature trees. The main part of the house is a 1 1/2-story wood-frame structure, with a side-gable roof, central chimney, and clapboarded exterior. It is oriented with its main facade to the south, with additions extending to the rear (north). The facade is five bays wide, with a center entrance topped by a four-light transom window. The interior, carefully restored after a 1968 fire, has the main parlor to the left, but deviates from typical period plans by placing the stairs to the upper level in the rear keeping room, instead of in the entry vestibule.

John Palmer moved to this area and built this house in 1790. Palmer was an influential member of the church in nearby Scotland, where he played a major role in the establishment of a Separatist congregation during the First Great Awakening of the 1740s, and successfully petitioned the state in the 1770s for relief from taxation for the support of the Congregationalist church. Palmer's church declined and was disbanded after his death. His house is notable for its relatively conservative (essentially retardaire to the mid-18th century) construction methods, and for its well-documented rehabilitation in the 20th century.

== See also ==
- National Register of Historic Places listings in New London County, Connecticut
