= Merrick-Simmons House =

Historic house in Florida, United States

- U.S. National Register of Historic Places
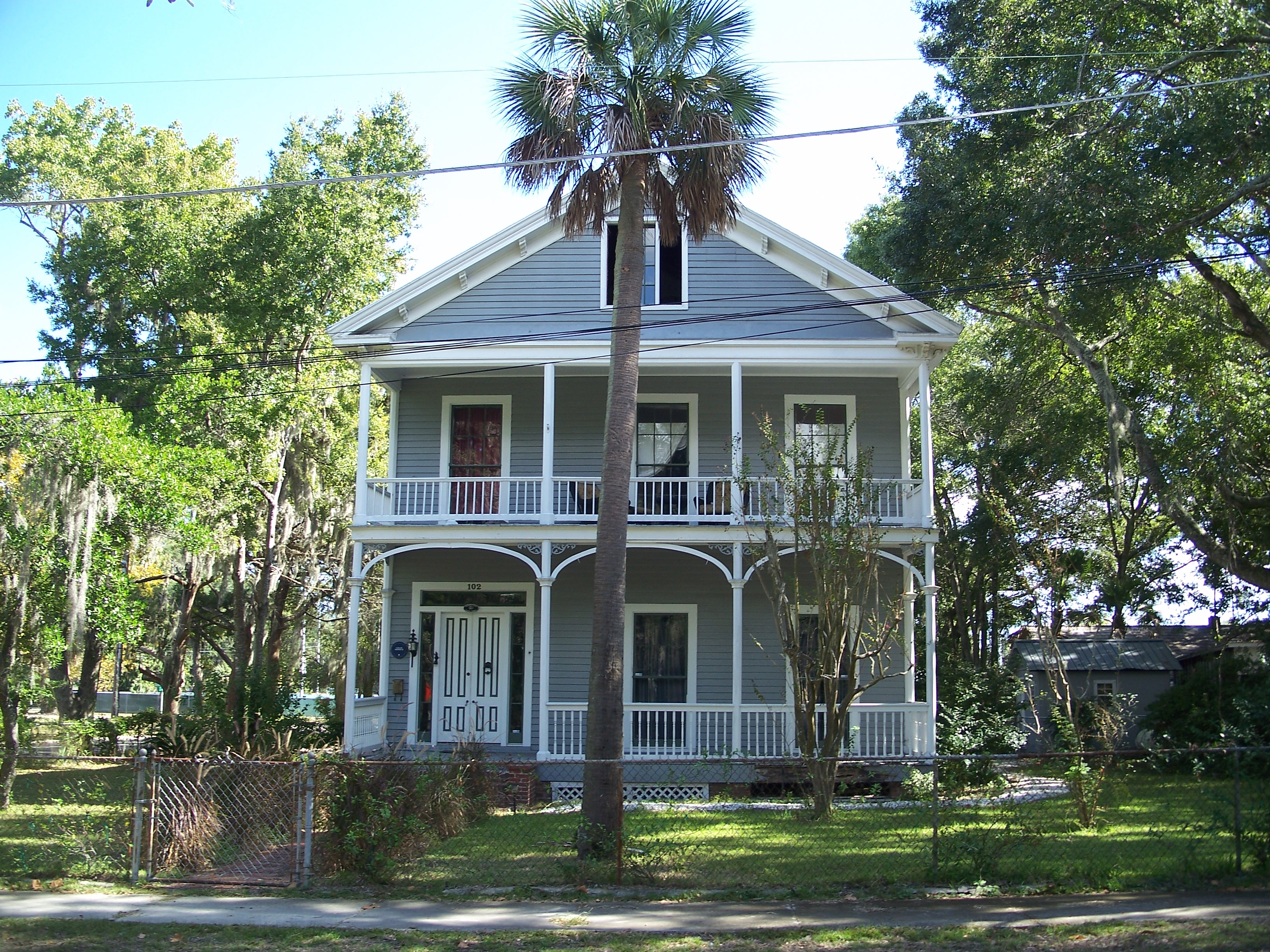

- Location within Florida Location within the United States
- Location: 102 S. 10th St., Fernandina Beach, Florida
- Coordinates: 30°40′8″N 81°27′26″W
- Built: 1861
- Architectural style: Greek Revival
- NRHP reference No.: 83001431
- Added to NRHP: January 13, 1983

The Merrick-Simmons House (also known as the C.W. Lewis House) is a historic house located at 102 South 10th Street in Fernandina Beach, Florida.

== Description and history ==
It was added to the National Register of Historic Places on January 13, 1983.
