= John Palmer House (Portland, Oregon) =

Historic house in Portland, Oregon, U.S.

- U.S. National Register of Historic Places
- Portland Historic Landmark
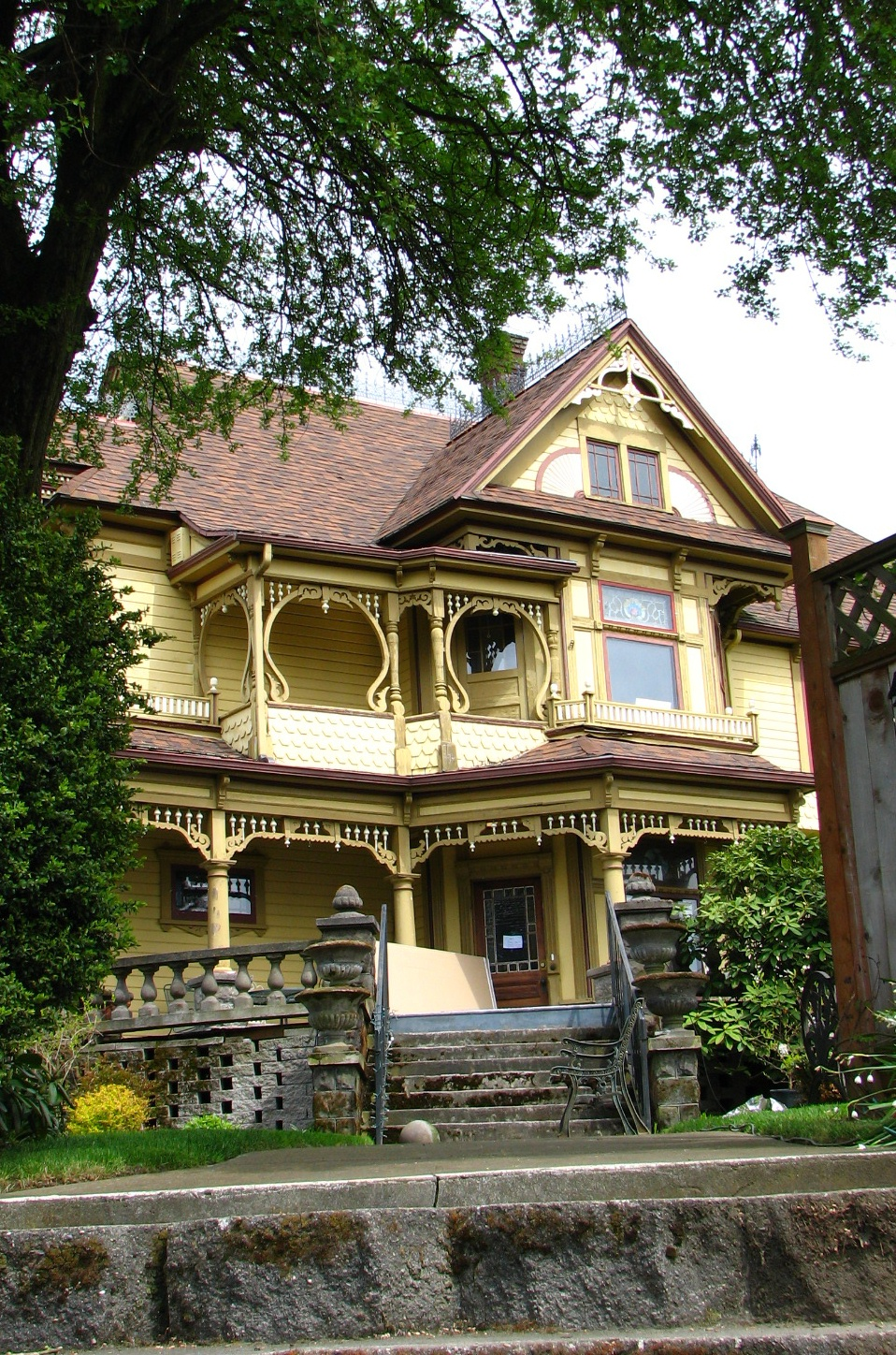
- Exterior in 2008

- Location within Portland, Oregon
- Location: 4314 N. Mississippi Avenue, Portland, Oregon
- Coordinates: 45°33′18″N 122°40′31″W
- Built: 1890
- NRHP reference No.: 78002320
- Added to NRHP: March 8, 1978

John Palmer House is a historic house in Portland, Oregon, United States. It is listed on the National Register of Historic Places.

John Palmer was a builder who settled in Portland, Oregon in the 19th century. Construction on the John Palmer House was started in 1890. John Palmer's wife died just four years after moving into the home. For many years the home was used as the Multnomah Conservatory of Music. The Sauter Family purchased the John Palmer House in the October of 1968 and lavished great care and attention on the home. They opened the home as a bed and breakfast and hosted many receptions and weddings in the beautiful garden until 2000. Maggie Kolkena and Susan Dunn purchased the home in 2008 for use by not-for-profit organizations. Refreshing this grand old house has included complete re-wiring and re-plumbing, the remodel of the kitchen and addition of a modern bathroom. The main floor, with its extravagant Bradbury & Bradbury wallpapers, remains largely unchanged. External work was initiated in the spring of 2010. The house has a new roof, a repaired porch and a new coat of paint. In fall of 2024 the house is expected to be remodeled again with new wood finishes, a more historic look is to be done on the interior of the house.

== See also ==
- National Register of Historic Places listings in North Portland, Oregon
