= John Denham Palmer House =

Historic house in Florida, United States

- U.S. National Register of Historic Places
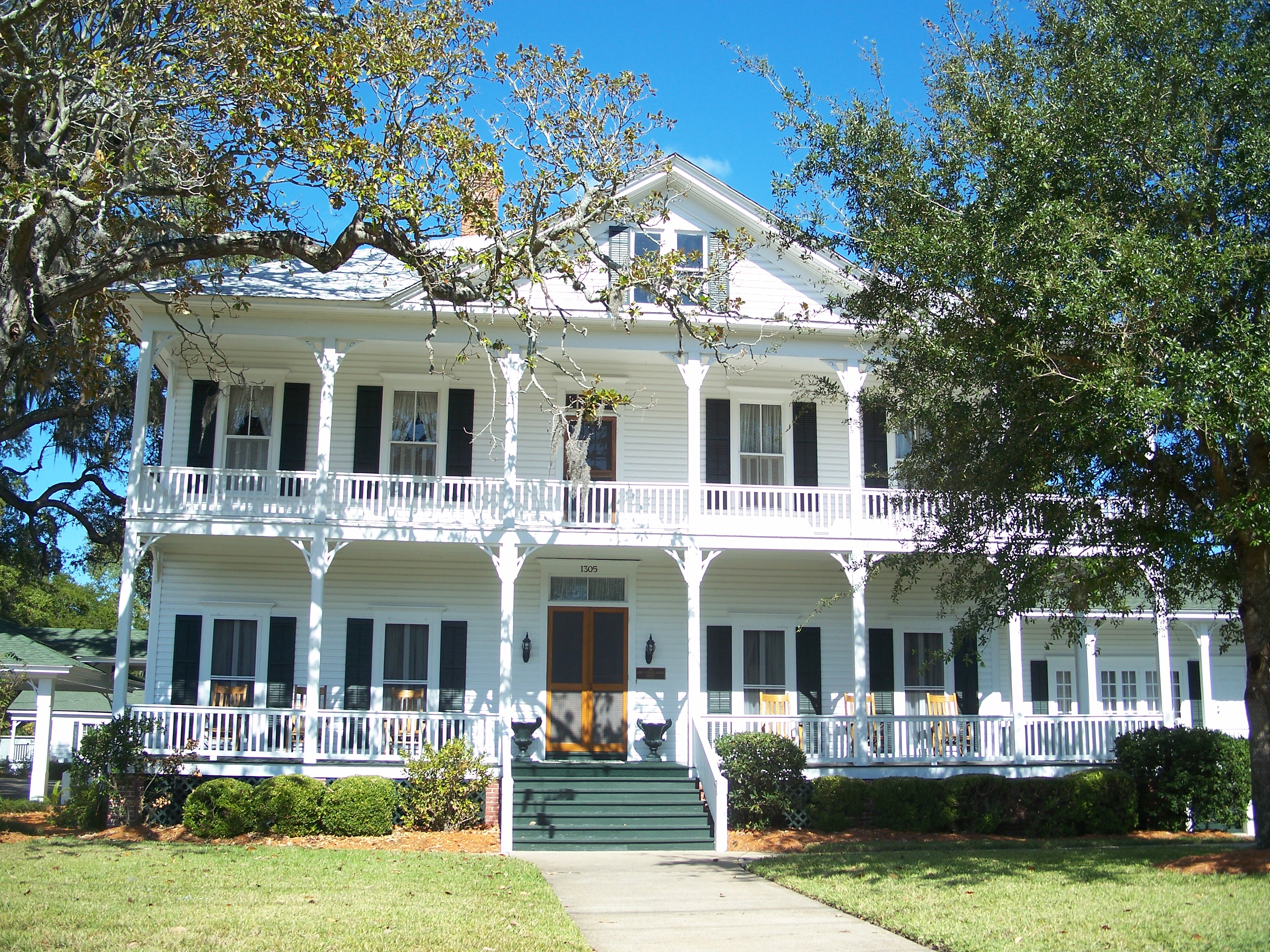

- Location within Florida Location within the United States
- Location: Fernandina Beach, Florida
- Coordinates: 30.67039°N 81.45258°W
- Area: less than one acre
- Built: c. 1891
- Architect: John R. Mann
- Architectural style: Frame Vernacular with Colonial Revival elements
- NRHP reference No.: 86001453
- Added to NRHP: July 3, 1986

The John Denham Palmer House (now also known as the Oxley-Heard Funeral Home) is a historic house in Fernandina Beach, Florida. It is located at 1305 Atlantic Avenue. On July 3, 1986, it was added to the U.S. National Register of Historic Places.
