= Kings Ferry =

Kings Ferry may refer to:

- The Kings Ferry, a bus and coach operator in Kent, UK
- Kings Ferry, Florida, a small town in the United States
