= Lessie, Florida =

Unincorporated community in Florida

Lessie is an unincorporated community in Nassau County, Florida, United States. It is located near the center of the county.

A post office called Lessie was established in 1899, and closed in 1908.

== Geography ==
Lessie is located at 30°43′30″N 81°46′38″W (30.725, -81.7772).
