= Dahoma, Florida =

Unincorporated community in Florida, U.S.

Dahoma is an unincorporated community in Nassau County, Florida, United States. It is located on US 301, in the southwestern part of the county.

== Geography ==
Dahoma is located at 30°28′11″N 81°54′31″W.
