= Franklintown, Florida =

Unincorporated community in Florida, U.S.

Franklintown is an unincorporated community in Nassau County, Florida, United States. It is located in the southern half of Amelia Island, on A1A near the Amelia River.

== Geography ==
Franklintown is located at 30°33′22″N 81°26′59″W.
