= Nassau County, Florida =

County in Florida, United States

- County
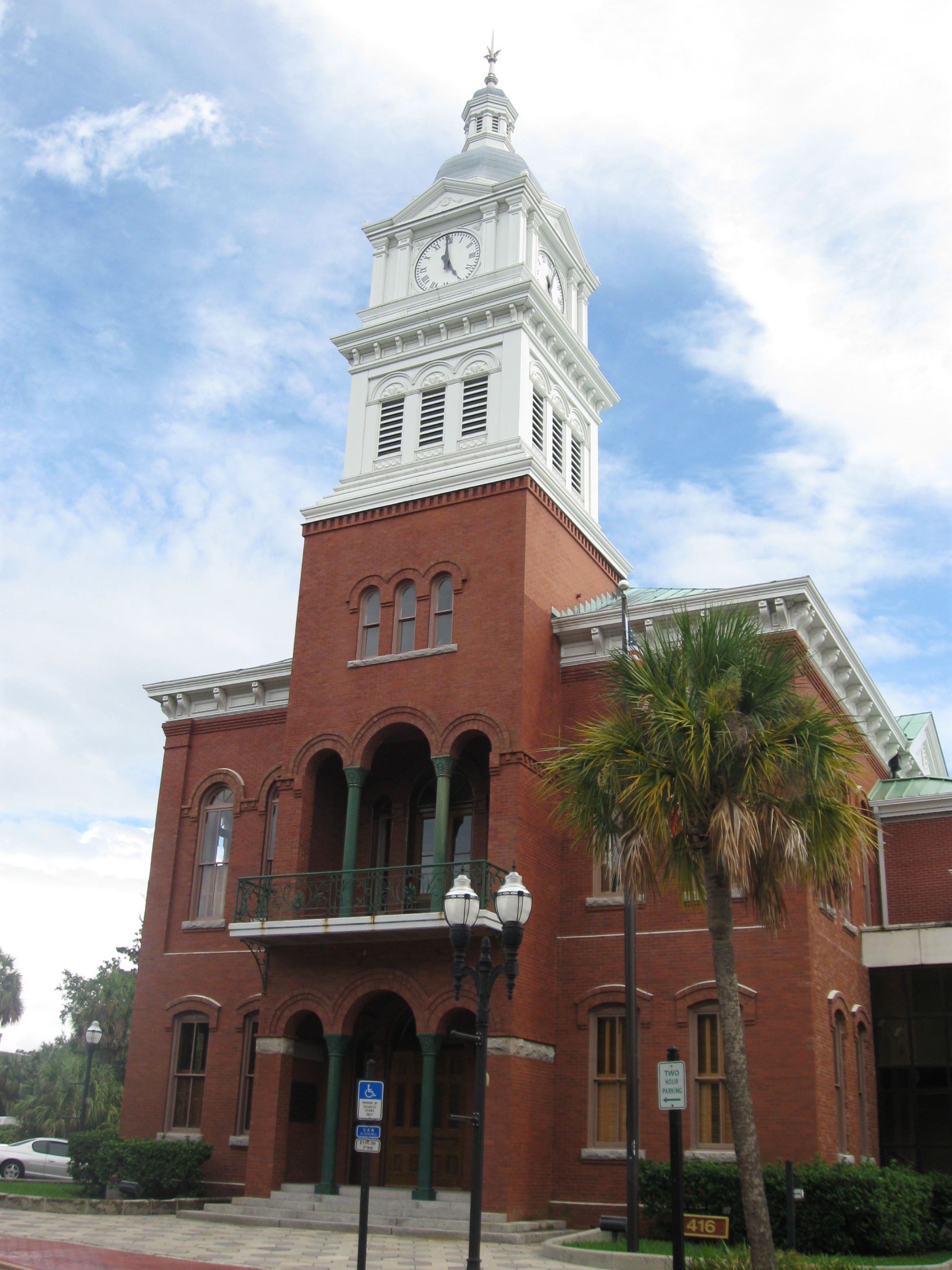
- Nassau County Courthouse

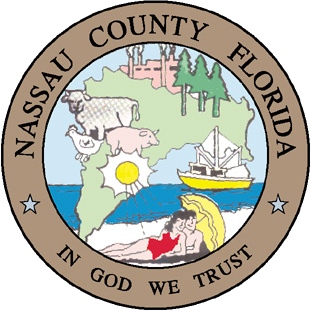
- Seal Logo

- Location within the U.S. state of Florida
- Coordinates: 30°37′N 81°46′W
- Country: United States
- State: Florida
- Founded: December 29, 1824
- Named for: Duchy of Nassau
- Seat: Fernandina Beach
- Largest community: Yulee

Area
  - Total: 726 sq mi (1,880 km^{2})
  - Land: 649 sq mi (1,680 km^{2})
  - Water: 77 sq mi (200 km^{2}) 10.6%

Population (2020)
  - Total: 90,352
  - Estimate (2025): 106,879 ▲
  - Density: 139/sq mi (53.8/km^{2})
- Time zone: UTC−5 (Eastern)
  - Summer (DST): UTC−4 (EDT)
- Congressional district: 4th
- Website: www.nassaucountyfl.com

Nassau County is located in the U.S. state of Florida. It is the northeasternmost county in the state. The county seat is Fernandina Beach. The population was 90,352 at the 2020 census.

Nassau County is a constituent of the Jacksonville, Florida Metropolitan Statistical Area, which accommodates around 1.68 million inhabitants as of 2022. The county is situated in Northeast Florida with a land area of 726 square miles (1,880 km^{2}). Population growth in the county has increased by over 28,000 residents since the year 2000 as a result of Nassau's proximity to downtown Jacksonville, new housing developments, agricultural production, tourism locations, and a diversifying tax base with new industrial and commercial companies moving to the county. Nassau County is also a favored residential destination for military personnel stationed at bases in the adjacent Duval County, Florida (Naval Air Station Jacksonville, Naval Station Mayport) and Camden County, Georgia (Naval Submarine Base Kings Bay). Nassau County celebrated 200 years with its bicentennial celebration in 2024.

== History ==
Nassau County was created in 1824 from Duval County. It was named for the Duchy of Nassau in Germany.

The ancestral and core coat of arms of Nassau

Coat of Arms for Nassau

The Battle of Alligator Bridge took place in Nassau County around Callahan on June 30, 1778, and was the only major engagement in an unsuccessful campaign to conquer British East Florida during the American Revolutionary War.

In 1817, the short-lived Republic of the Floridas was established on Amelia Island. It was one of several attempts to wrest Florida from Spanish control into the growing United States.

Some of the men from the county had formed a militia unit called the Davis Guards leading up to the Civil War. This unit would be organized as Company K of the 2nd Florida Infantry Regiment in the Confederate army.

== Law and government ==
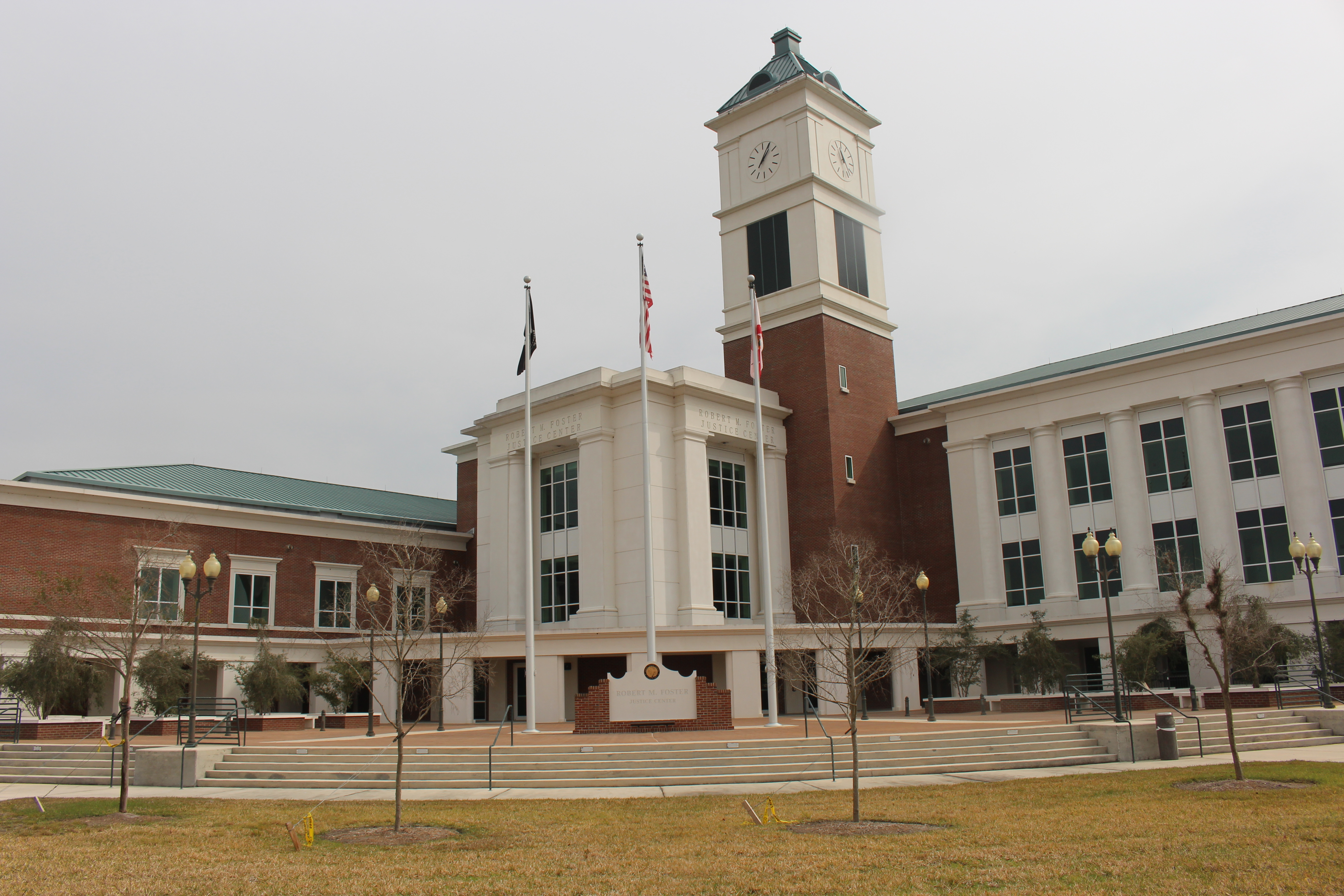
Robert M. Foster Justice Center in Yulee

=== County commissioners ===
Nassau County operates under the administration of the Nassau County Board of County Commissioners, comprising five members. These commissioners are elected by the voters to serve four-year terms, with the election cycle structured such that either three or two commissioners are subject to election every two years. The following individuals constitute the Nassau County Commissioners:

Commissioner	Term
John Martin (Chairman)	2020–2028
A.M. "Hupp" Huppman (Vice-Chairman)	2022-2026
Jeff Gray	2020–2028
Alyson McCullough	2022-2026
Klynt Farmer	2020–2028

=== Ocean Highway and Port Authority ===
Ocean Highway & Port Authority of Nassau County Florida
- Abbreviation: OHPA
- Formation: 1941
- Type: agency
- Headquarters: Fernandina Beach, Florida
- Location: 86130 License Road
- Region served: Nassau County, Florida
- Website: www.portoffernandina.org

The Ocean Highway & Port Authority (OHPA) functions as an autonomous governmental organization within Nassau County, Florida, responsible for the ownership and management of the seaport infrastructure at the Port of Fernandina. OHPA was founded in 1941 by the Florida Legislature. Relay Terminals is the current operating partner of the Port.

The Port of Fernandina is a terminal for pulp and paper as well as steel exports, machinery, auto parts, chemicals, beverages, chemicals, building materials and food products. Container lines from the port serve routes to Colombia, Venezuela, the Dominican Republic, Haiti, Jamaica, Aruba, Curaçao, and Bermuda. In 2020 the port received over a million dollar grant from the United States Department of Transportation to start a barge service.

OHPA Commissioners

- District 1: Miriam Hill
- District 2: Scott Moore
- District 3: Justin M. Taylor (Chair)
- District 4: Ray Nelson (Vice-Chair)
- District 5: Michael Cole

=== Nassau County Soil and Water Conservation District ===
The main environmental and agricultural body is the Nassau County Soil and Water Conservation District, which works closely with other area agencies. According to a summary taken from Florida Statutes Ch. 582, the Board's powers include conducting surveys, investigations, research and demonstrational projects relating to soil and water conservation (in areas like irrigation, water quality, and soil erosion). SWCD supervisors do not receive monetary compensation, and, for the most part, conduct their activities on their own time. Supervisors are members of a five-person board for the district, to which they can either be elected or appointed.

=== Police ===
The Nassau County Sheriff's Office provides services for the citizens of Nassau County. The Office of the Sheriff has a duty to enforce both the Florida Constitution and Florida state laws and statutes, and to provide for the security, safety and well-being of its citizens. This is accomplished through the delivery of law enforcement services, the operation of the Nassau County Jail and Detention Center, and the provision of court security. The Nassau County Sheriff's Office Headquarters are in Yulee. As of 2023 the Sheriff is Bill Leeper.

=== Court houses ===
The Nassau County Courthouse in Fernandina Beach is a historic two-story red brick courthouse built in 1891.

The Robert M. Foster Justice Center, located in Yulee, was opened in 2004 to augment the historic Nassau County Courthouse location. This facility contains over 111,000 square feet and cost over $20 million to build.

== Climate ==
Like much of the south Atlantic region of the United States, Nassau County has a humid subtropical climate (Köppen Cfa), with mild weather during winters and hot and humid weather during summers. Seasonal rainfall is concentrated in the warmest months from May through September, while the driest months are from November through April. Yulee's low latitude and proximity to the coast allow for little cold weather, and winters are typically mild and sunny.

Climate data for Nassau County, Florida
Month	Jan	Feb	Mar	Apr	May	Jun	Jul	Aug	Sep	Oct	Nov	Dec	Year
Mean daily maximum °F (°C)	63.0 (17.2)	65.8 (18.8)	71.2 (21.8)	76.8 (24.9)	83.3 (28.5)	88.0 (31.1)	90.6 (32.6)	89.3 (31.8)	85.6 (29.8)	79.2 (26.2)	72.2 (22.3)	64.9 (18.3)	77.5 (25.3)
Daily mean °F (°C)	53.8 (12.1)	56.5 (13.6)	61.9 (16.6)	67.7 (19.8)	75.0 (23.9)	80.4 (26.9)	82.6 (28.1)	82.1 (27.8)	79.2 (26.2)	72.1 (22.3)	63.9 (17.7)	56.3 (13.5)	69.3 (20.7)
Mean daily minimum °F (°C)	44.5 (6.9)	47.2 (8.4)	52.6 (11.4)	58.6 (14.8)	66.7 (19.3)	72.8 (22.7)	74.6 (23.7)	74.9 (23.8)	72.8 (22.7)	65.0 (18.3)	55.6 (13.1)	47.6 (8.7)	61.1 (16.2)
Average precipitation inches (mm)	3.42 (87)	3.20 (81)	3.92 (100)	2.82 (72)	2.31 (59)	5.27 (134)	5.52 (140)	5.82 (148)	6.91 (176)	4.59 (117)	2.08 (53)	2.95 (75)	48.81 (1,240)
Average precipitation days (≥ 0.01 in)	9.1	8.4	8.4	5.9	6.0	11.5	11.9	12.5	11.8	8.1	7.3	8.2	109.1
Source: NOAA (1981–2010 Normals)

== Geography ==
According to the U.S. Census Bureau, the county has an area of 726 square miles (1,880 km^{2}), of which 649 square miles (1,680 km^{2}) is land and 77 square miles (200 km^{2}) (10.6%) is water. The city of Fernandina Beach is on Amelia Island, the county's one inhabited island. Fernandina Beach municipality extends across the Intracoastal Waterway along A1A to Yulee.

=== Topography ===
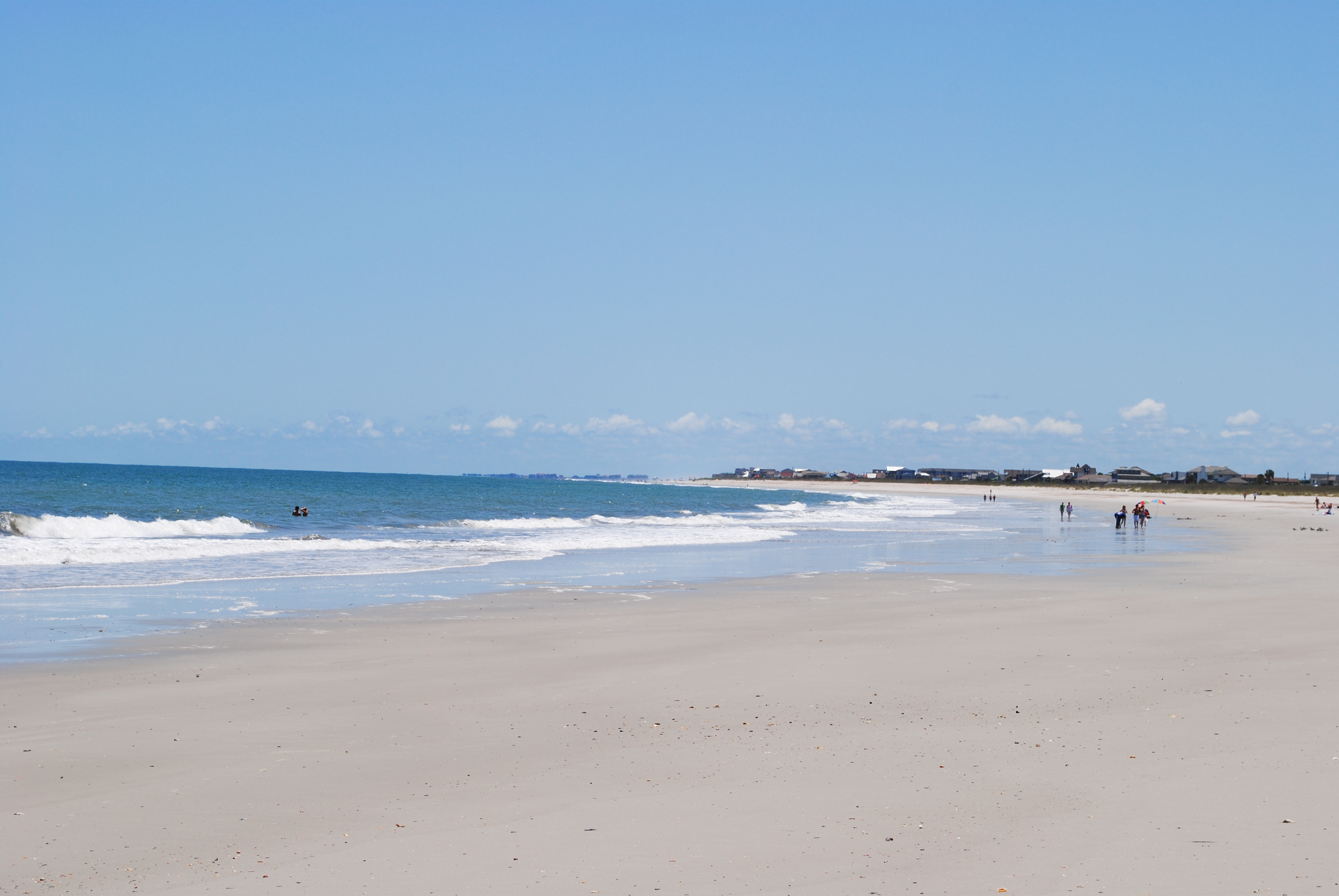
Fernandina Beach

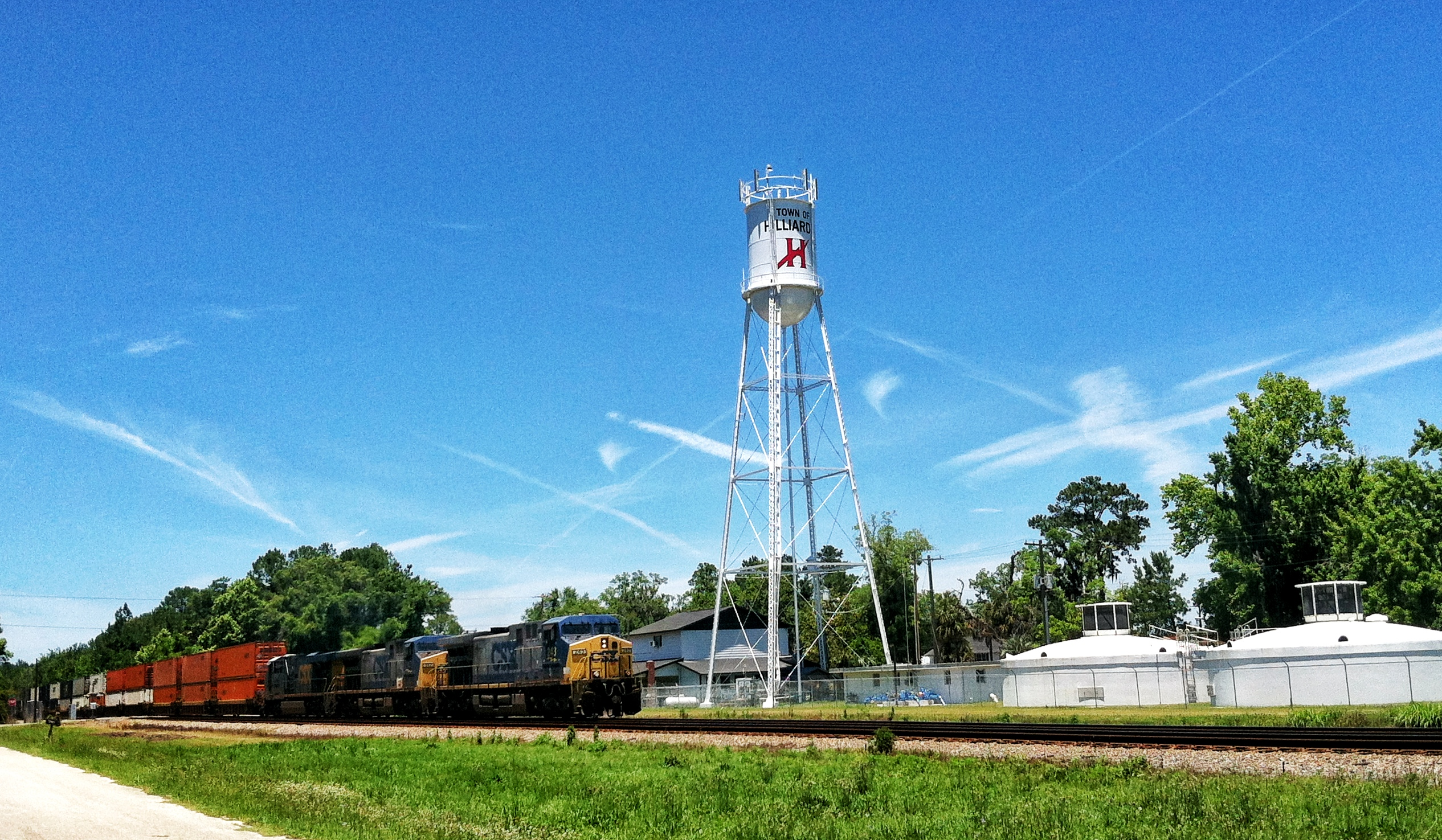
Hilliard

There are 12 distinct topographical zones in Nassau County. Most of these zones run in narrow bands stretching from north to south, although this is less true as one approaches the Atlantic coast.

1. Directly against the western border with Baker County, the topography ranges from fairly flat to slightly elevated. Drainage is poor and the soil is sandy.
2. Moving east, there are some areas (mostly in the northern and central county) of higher ground with much better drainage.
3. East of these areas are some lower places, especially in the south, that are level and have extremely poor drainage.
4. Eastward again, there is a stretch that ranges from a few miles in the extreme northern areas to about 6-8 miles (13 km) wide in the southern area, including Hilliard and much of County Road 108 and State Road 301. This area again has very poor drainage, low-lying land, and fairly sandy soil.
5. East of this are scattered areas of high, sandy land with spotty or poor drainage.
6. East of this, there is an area including Callahan with very sandy soil on top, and clay underneath. This section of the county is heavily permeated by small creeks and rivers, which bring with them low, poorly drained soils. This zone extends across the entire county from north to south at a fairly consistent width of about 3-4 miles (6.4 km), except in the north, where it widens to nearly 6 miles (9.7 km) across.
7. East of this area is a large band of land with a consistent width of about 8 miles (13 km). The land is low and level with extremely poor drainage, and it is permeated by small creeks and rivers. In the northern section, this is where some tributaries join the St. Marys River, while in the south a number of tributaries drain into the Nassau River, which flows into the Nassau Sound and the Atlantic Ocean.
8. East of this area is a section of land about 3 miles (4.8 km) in width that has extremely sandy soils with bad drainage all around.
9. Further eastward is a large area, including Yulee and O'Neil, about 4 miles (6.4 km) in width, with poor drainage and sandy soil at higher elevations, pockmarked by large areas of low lands with even worse drainage.
10. To the south is an area of low-lying, organic soils which are essentially marshes and wetlands along the northern bank of the Nassau River, continuing into the Nassau Sound.
11. Still eastward and somewhat to the north is a large area of marshes and organic soils which characterize area wetlands. There are many small islands in this area, and it is permeated by the Bells River and Jolly River, which empty into the Cumberland Sound to the north, just below Cumberland Island.
12. Amelia Island, the easternmost section of the county, is characterized by poor drainage in the west and better drained, higher, sandier land as one travels eastward towards the beach. The northern area of the island features salty marshlands surrounding Egan's Creek, which runs directly beneath Atlantic Boulevard in Fernandina Beach.

=== Adjacent counties ===
- Camden County, Georgia – north
- Duval County – south/east
- Baker County – southwest
- Charlton County, Georgia – west

== Transportation ==
=== Airports ===
- Fernandina Beach Municipal Airport
- Hilliard Airpark

=== Major highways ===
- I-95 / SR 9 (Interstate 95)
- I-10 / SR 8 (Interstate 10)
- US 1 / SR 15
- US 17 / SR 5
- US 23
- US 90 / SR 10
- US 301
- SR A1A
- CR 2 (County extension of SR 2)
- CR 15A
- CR 108
- SR 115 / CR 115
- CR 119
- SR 200

I-10 and US 90 have no exits in Nassau County

=== Railroads ===
The main railroad line through Nassau County is the CSX Nahunta Subdivision, which runs parallel to the west side of US 1 and 23 from the Jacksonville Terminal through the bridge over the Saint Mary's River in Boulogne. It also has a junction with the CSX Callahan Subdivision which runs parallel to US 301 from the Duval County Line almost to Callahan. This line also once had an extension to the Fernandina Subdivision, as well as a second extension to Gross, which were abandoned in 1954 and 1985 respectively.

A third CSX line exists closer to the east coast of the state known as the Kingsland Subdivision, which runs parallel to US 17 from the Duval County line to Yulee, where it joins the First Coast Railroad, a class three railroad that runs along the Fernandina Subdivision and the former Kingsland Subdivision north of Yulee.

The other major railroad line in the county is Norfolk Southern Railway's Valdosta District, which spans northwest to southeast from a bridge over the Saint Mary's River in Kent to the Jacksonville Terminal. The Valdosta District has a diamond junction with the Callahan Subdivision in Crawford.

== Demographics ==
Historical population
Census	Pop.	Note	%±
1830	1,511		—
1840	1,892		25.2%
1850	2,164		14.4%
1860	3,644		68.4%
1870	4,247		16.5%
1880	6,635		56.2%
1890	8,294		25.0%
1900	9,654		16.4%
1910	10,525		9.0%
1920	11,340		7.7%
1930	9,375		−17.3%
1940	10,826		15.5%
1950	12,811		18.3%
1960	17,189		34.2%
1970	20,626		20.0%
1980	32,894		59.5%
1990	43,941		33.6%
2000	57,663		31.2%
2010	73,314		27.1%
2020	90,352		23.2%
2025 (est.)	106,879	▲	18.3%
U.S. Decennial Census; 1790–1960 1900–1990; 1990–2000 2010–2019

=== Racial and ethnic composition ===
Nassau County, Florida – Racial and ethnic composition Note: the US Census treats Hispanic/Latino as an ethnic category. This table excludes Latinos from the racial categories and assigns them to a separate category. Hispanics/Latinos may be of any race.
Race / Ethnicity (NH = Non-Hispanic)	Pop 1980	Pop 1990	Pop 2000	Pop 2010	Pop 2020	% 1980	% 1990	% 2000	% 2010	% 2020
White alone (NH)	27,879	38,697	51,323	64,410	75,817	84.75%	88.07%	89.01%	87.85%	83.91%
Black or African American alone (NH)	4,447	4,509	4,436	4,581	4,945	13.52%	10.26%	7.69%	6.25%	5.47%
Native American or Alaska Native alone (NH)	58	120	228	248	222	0.18%	0.27%	0.40%	0.34%	0.25%
Asian alone (NH)	48	129	251	619	863	0.15%	0.29%	0.44%	0.84%	0.96%
Native Hawaiian or Pacific Islander alone (NH)	x	x	18	46	52	x	x	0.03%	0.06%	0.06%
Other race alone (NH)	14	6	32	98	293	0.04%	0.01%	0.06%	0.13%	0.32%
Mixed race or Multiracial (NH)	x	x	502	932	3,711	x	x	0.87%	1.27%	4.11%
Hispanic or Latino (any race)	448	480	873	2,380	4,449	1.36%	1.09%	1.51%	3.25%	4.92%
Total	32,894	43,941	57,663	73,314	90,352	100.00%	100.00%	100.00%	100.00%	100.00%

=== 2020 census ===
As of the 2020 census, the county had a population of 90,352, 35,919 households, and 26,196 families. The population density was 139.3 per square mile (53.8/km^{2}), and there were 41,628 housing units at an average density of 64.2 per square mile (24.8/km^{2}).

The racial makeup of the county was 85.3% (77,047) white or European American (83.91% non-Hispanic white), 5.6% (5,035) black or African-American, 0.3% (300) Native American or Alaska Native, 1.0% (890) Asian, 0.1% (61) Pacific Islander or Native Hawaiian, 1.4% (1,278) from other races, and 6.4% (5,741) from two or more races. Hispanic or Latino residents of any race comprised 4.9% (4,449) of the population.

56.2% of residents lived in urban areas, while 43.8% lived in rural areas.

There were 35,919 households, of which 28.0% had children under the age of 18 living in them. Of all households, 57.4% were married-couple households, 14.5% were households with a male householder and no spouse or partner present, and 22.3% were households with a female householder and no spouse or partner present. About 22.1% of all households were made up of individuals and 11.3% had someone living alone who was 65 years of age or older. The average household size was 2.5 and the average family size was 2.9. The percent of those with a bachelor's degree or higher was estimated to be 22.2% of the population.

There were 41,628 housing units, of which 13.7% were vacant. Among occupied housing units, 80.4% were owner-occupied and 19.6% were renter-occupied. The homeowner vacancy rate was 2.0% and the rental vacancy rate was 10.8%.

20.1% of the population was under the age of 18, 6.6% from 18 to 24, 21.2% from 25 to 44, 28.5% from 45 to 64, and 23.7% who were 65 years of age or older. The median age was 46.9 years. For every 100 females there were 95.0 males, and for every 100 females age 18 and over there were 92.9 males age 18 and over.

The 2016–2020 5-year American Community Survey estimates show that the median household income was $72,998 (with a margin of error of +/- $3,786). The median family income was $84,984 (+/- $3,364). Males had a median income of $45,003 (+/- $2,709) versus $28,315 (+/- $2,311) for females. The median income for those above 16 years old was $35,889 (+/- $1,972). Approximately, 7.6% of families and 9.8% of the population were below the poverty line, including 12.6% of those under the age of 18 and 7.0% of those ages 65 or over.

=== 2000 census ===
As of the census of 2000, there were 57,663 people, 21,980 households, and 16,528 families residing in the county. The population density was 34/km^{2} (88/sq mi). There were 25,917 housing units at an average density of 15/km^{2} (40/sq mi). The racial makeup of the county was 90.0% White, 7.7% Black or African American, 0.4% Native American, 0.5% Asian, <0.1% Pacific Islander, 0.3% from other races, and 1.0% from two or more races. 1.5% of the population were Hispanic or Latino of any race.

According to the 2000 Census, the largest European ancestry groups in Nassau County were: English (36.2%), Irish (13.6%) and German (11.7%).

There were 21,980 households, out of which 32.8% had children under the age of 18 living with them, 61.2% were married couples living together, 9.9% had a female householder with no husband present, and 24.80% were non-families. 20.1% of all households were made up of individuals, and 7.7% had someone living alone who was 65 years of age or older. The average household size was 2.59 and the average family size was 2.97.

In the county, the population was spread out, with 25.0% under the age of 18, 7.2% from 18 to 24, 28.8% from 25 to 44, 26.3% from 45 to 64, and 12.6% who were 65 years of age or older. The median age was 38 years. For every 100 females there were 97.3 males. For every 100 females age 18 and over, there were 94.8 males.

As of 2021, the median income for a household in the county was $64,943. The per capita income for the county was $36,553. About 8.1% of the population were below the poverty line.

== Economy ==
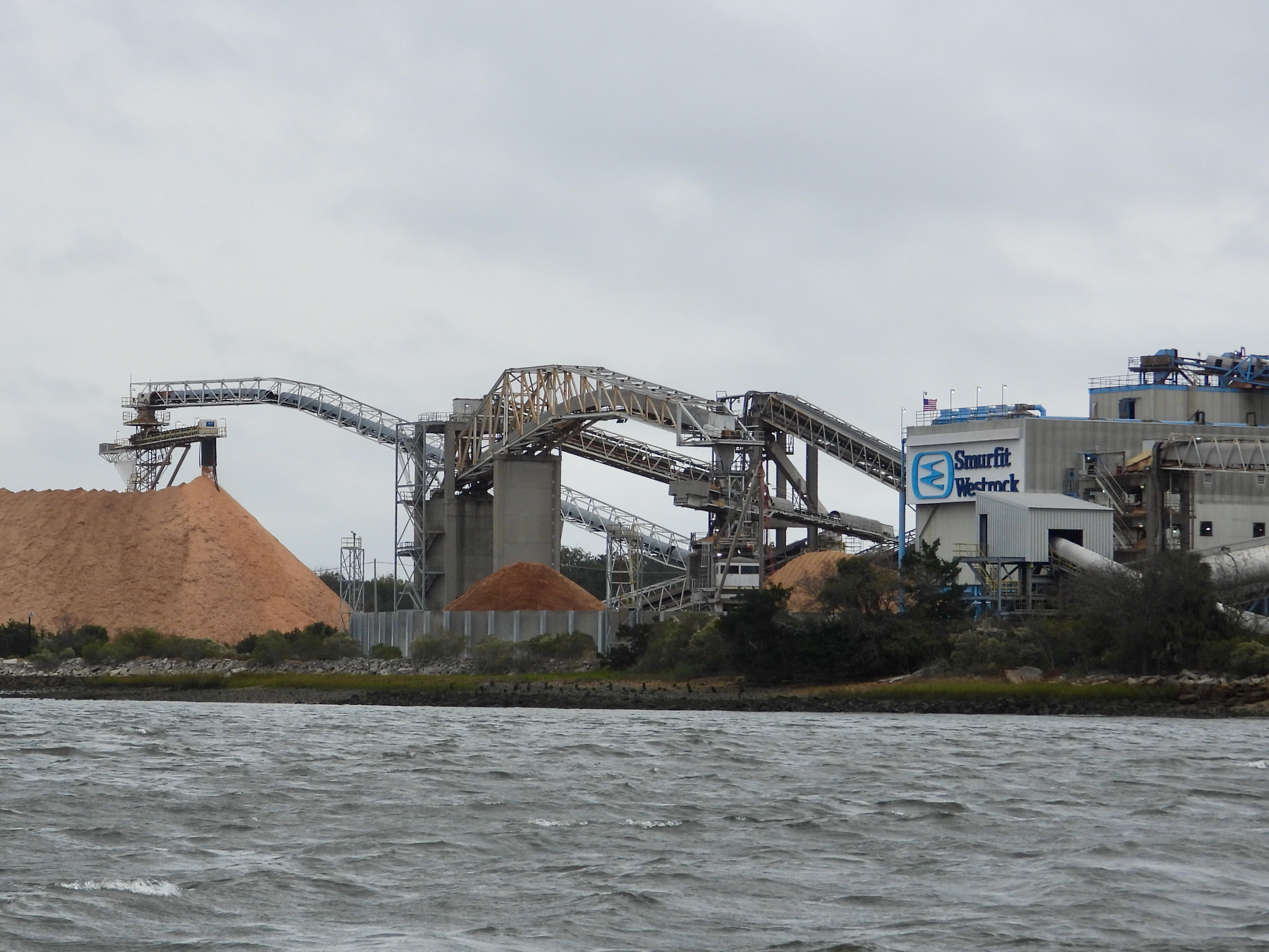
The Smurfit Westrock paper mill (originally Roayonier) at Fernandina Beach

Nassau County's economy ranges from agricultural activity (mostly in the form of tree farms) in the west and central areas, to a variety of activities closer to Amelia Island. Much of the land used for tree farming is owned by Rayonier, a major employer in the area, and the owner of a large pulp mill in Fernandina Beach. Historically, tree farming, trucking, and pulp production have characterized a large portion of the local economy. However, extensive growth is occurring in the outlying small towns in the rural western area, and the home construction market is still quite strong. Fernandina Beach has long been known for professional industries such as real estate, legal services, and medical care, and is also the closest city to two upscale resorts: the Ritz-Carlton Hotel and Omni Amelia Island Resort. In the central area of the county, a private tract of land known as the White Oak Conservation was once owned by a wealthy family who ran the area as a private zoo, complete with exotic animals such as giraffes and large albino cats. Numerous public figures, including former President Bill Clinton, have vacationed at the resort.

Nassau County has several outdoor festivals and events. The county is home to two world-class golf courses: The Golf Club at North Hampton was designed in part by Arnold Palmer, and is over 7,000 acres (2,800 ha), has 18 holes and a 72 par. and the Amelia National Golf & Country Club, designed by Tom Fazio which has 18 holes and a 72 par.

The Nassau County Economic Development Board, which represents all of Nassau County as a desirable place to relocate a business or to expand a business. In November 2017 it was announced that the University of Florida will be building two health and fitness facilities. In January 2018 the large energy company Florida Public Utilities announced that they will be relocating to Yulee and will be building a new 55,000-square-foot (5,100 m^{2}) corporate headquarters.

In 2017 Rayonier completed building a new corporate headquarters in Yulee. Rayonier also plans to develop a 24,000-acre (9,700 ha) pine forest in Yulee into a community complete with housing, offices, medical facilities, shopping centers, light industrial facilities and schools. The development, starting with 4,200 acres (1,700 ha) and is called Wildlight. Rayonier is also working with Nassau County to develop the Wildlight Elementary School at a cost of $26 million which is scheduled to open for the start of the 2017–2018 academic year with 600 students.

Fernandina Beach Municipal Airport, a general aviation airport and former military airbase that is also now used at times by the U.S. Navy, the U.S. Coast Guard and the Florida Air National Guard and is in Amelia Island three nautical miles (5.6 km) south of the central business district of Fernandina Beach. It is designated as a reliever airport for Jacksonville International Airport.

Located in Hilliard is a Federal Aviation Administration (FAA) Air Traffic Control Center, which coordinates most commercial and civilian air traffic for the southeastern United States. The FAA center is a major employer in Hilliard, and many retired FAA employees live in Nassau County.

The Florida Welcome Center in the county is a "tourist information house", near the Florida/Georgia state line on I-95. This center provides incoming visitors with a variety of information on travel, highways, sports, climate, accommodations, cities, outdoor recreation, and attractions. In tribute to the citrus industry (which historically has been a major part of Florida's economy), every visitor is offered a free cup of Florida citrus juice (orange or grapefruit)..

=== Top employers ===
According to the Nassau County website as of June 2019, the top employers in the county are:

#	Employer	# of Employees in 2019
1	Nassau County School District	1,598
2	The Omni Amelia Island Resort	1,200
3	Nassau County Government	672
4	The Ritz-Carlton, Amelia Island	700
5	Federal Aviation Administration	550
6	WestRock	460
7	Baptist Medical Center Nassau	420
8	Rayonier Advanced Materials	300
9	Care Centers of Nassau	250
10	Rayonier	249

== Education ==
=== Public – Nassau County School District ===
Nassau County Public School District operates public schools. Its schools are below:

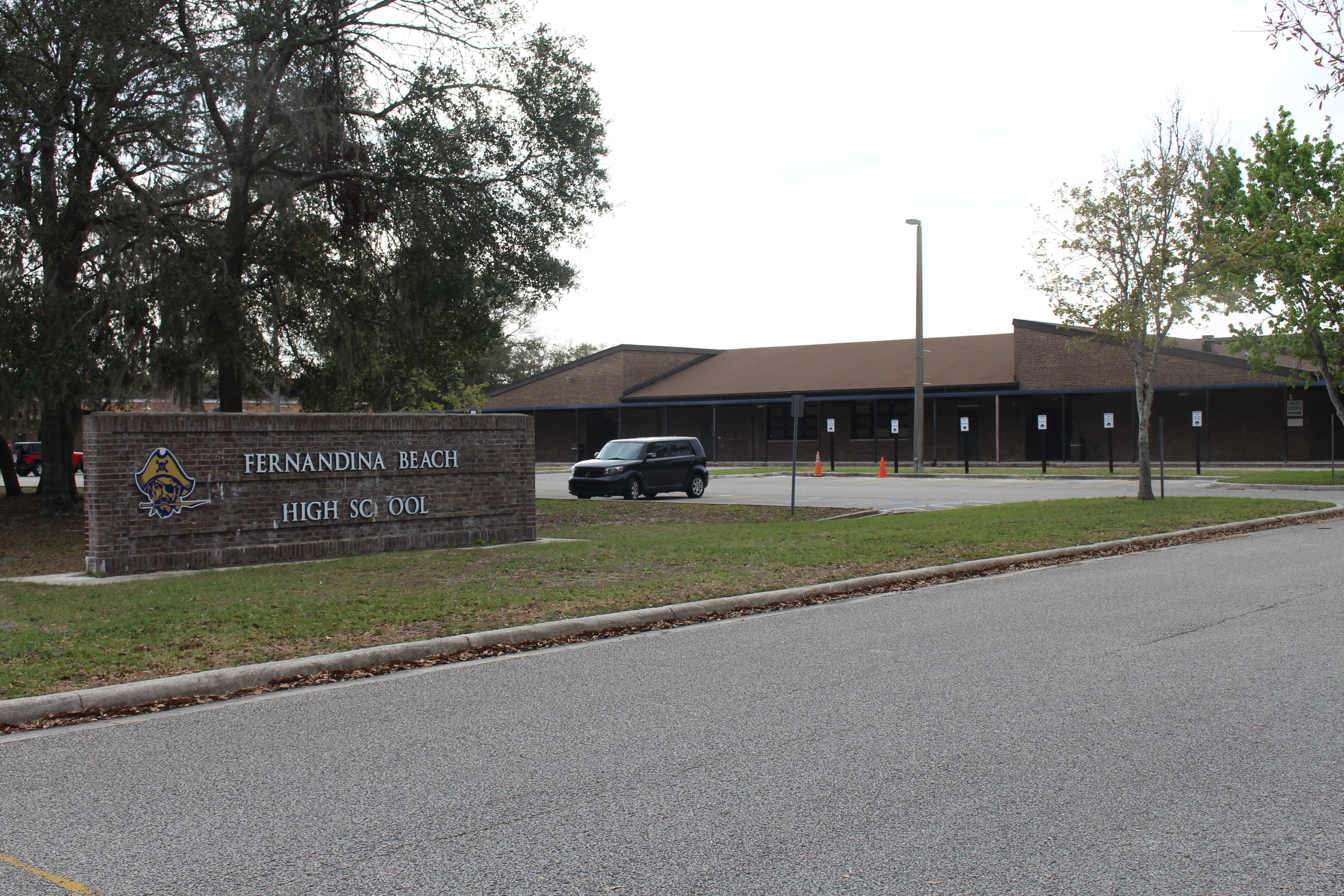
Fernandina Beach High School

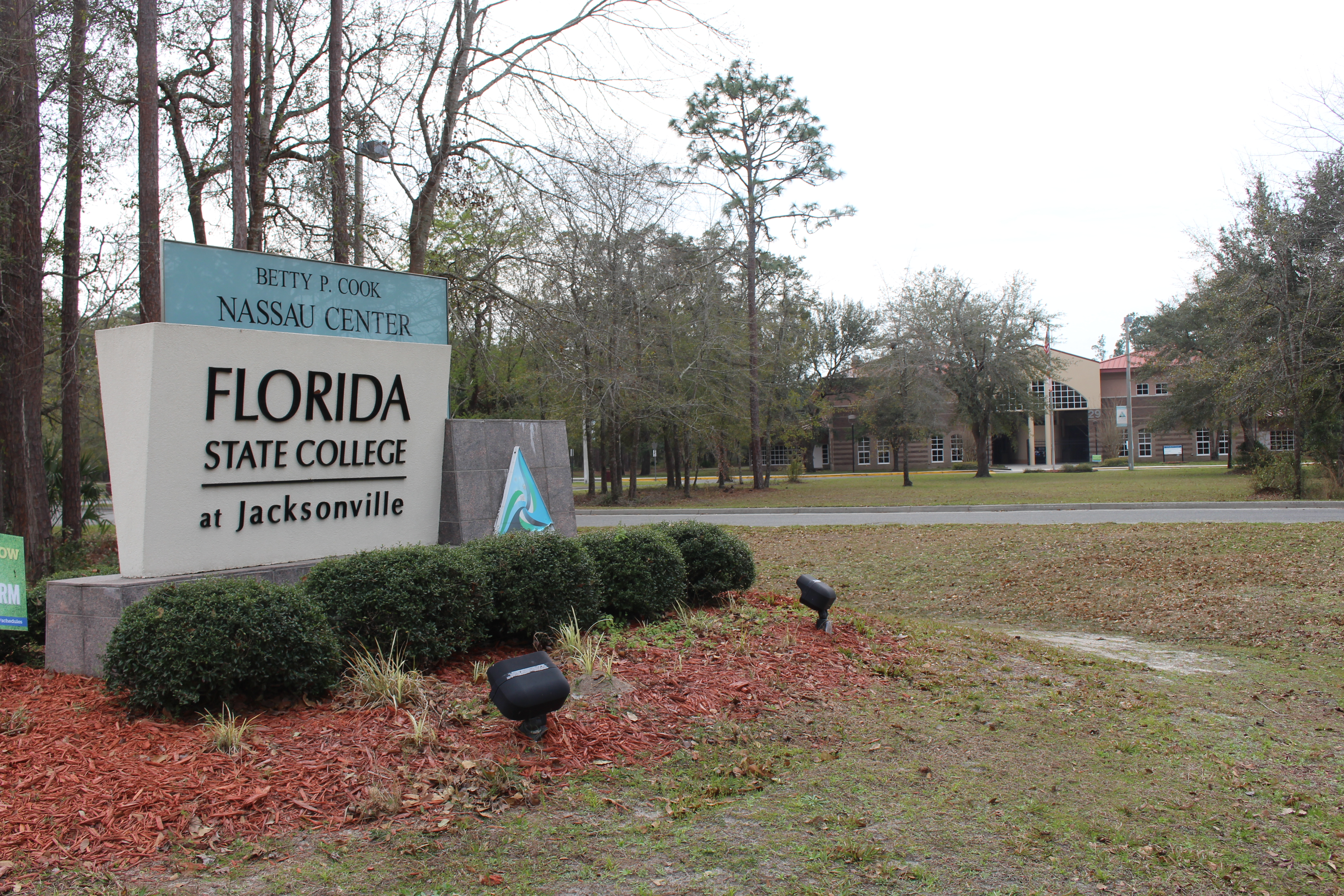
FSCJ Betty Cook Center

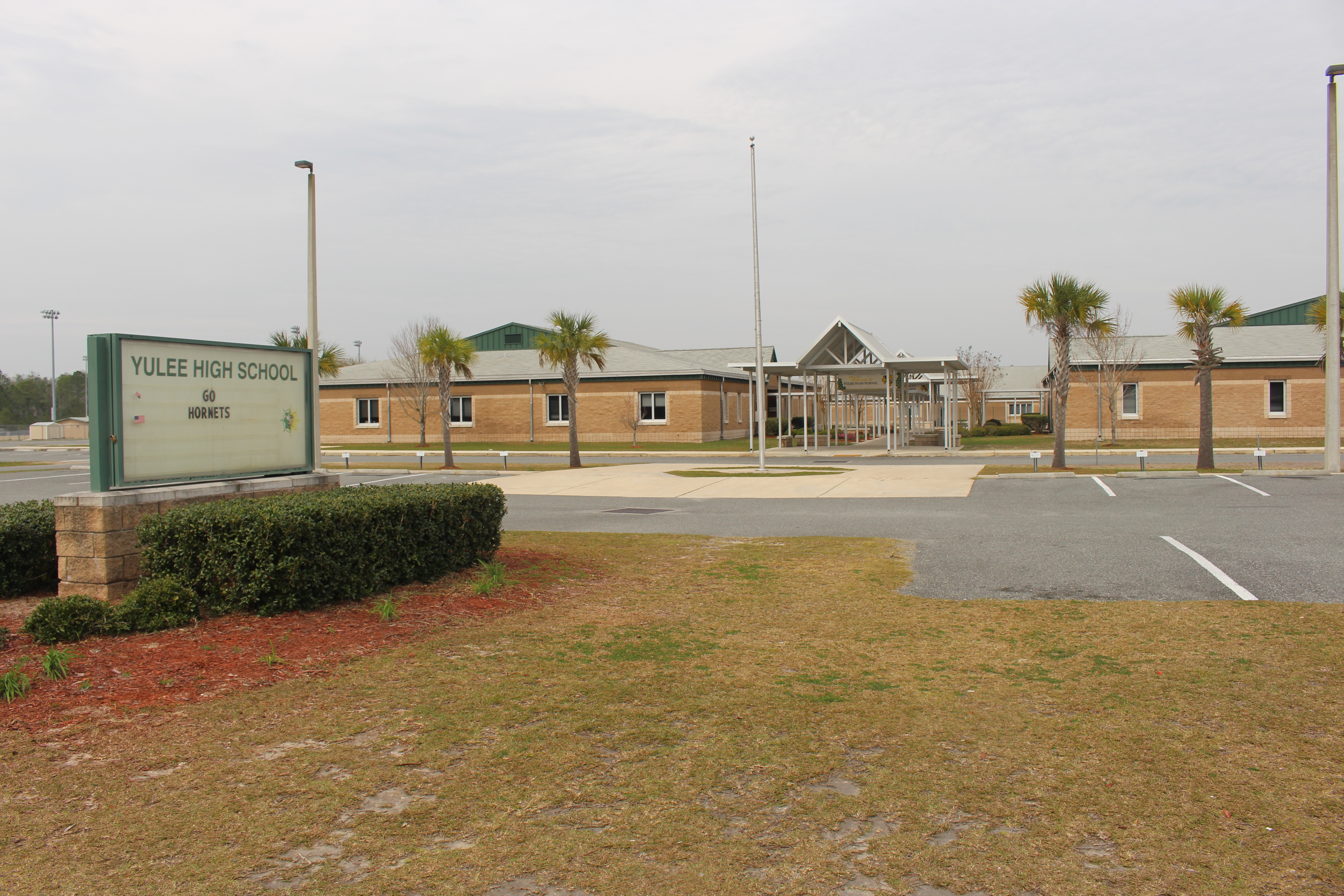
Yulee High School

Elementary schools:

- Bryceville Elementary (K-5) – Bryceville
- Callahan Elementary (PreK-2) – Callahan
- Callahan Intermediate (3–5) – Callahan
- Emma Love Hardee Elementary (3–5) – Fernandina Beach
- Hilliard Elementary (PreK-5) – Hilliard
- Southside Elementary (PreK-2) – Fernandina Beach
- Wildlight Elementary (K-5) – Wildlight
- Yulee Elementary (3–5) – Yulee
- Yulee Primary (PreK-2) – Yulee

Middle schools:

- Callahan Middle (6–8) (Mascot: Ramblers) – Callahan
- Fernandina Beach Middle (6–8) (Mascot: Pirates) – Fernandina Beach
- Yulee Middle (6–8) (Mascot: Hornets) – Yulee

High schools:

- Fernandina Beach High (9–12) (Mascot: Pirates) – Fernandina Beach
- West Nassau High (9–12) (Mascot: Warriors) – Callahan
- Yulee High (9–12) (Mascot: Hornets) – Yulee

Middle-senior high schools:

- Hilliard Middle-Senior High (6–12) (Mascot: Red Flashes) – Hilliard

=== Private schools ===
- Amelia Island Montessori ( Pre Kindergarten-8) – Fernandina Beach
- Faith Christian Academy (Pre- Kindergarten-12) – Fernandina Beach
- Fernandina Beach Christian Academy ( Kindergarten-5th (2015)) – Fernandina Beach
- Nassau Christian School ( Pre Kindergarten-12) – Yulee
- St. Michaels Academy (Pre Kindergarten-8) – Fernandina Beach
- Sonshine Christian School( Pre Kindergarten-12) – Callahan

=== Higher education ===
Florida State College at Jacksonville, a state college in the Florida College System, has a campus in Nassau County near Yulee called the Betty Cook Center. It is accredited by the Southern Association of Colleges and Schools to award associates degrees and bachelor's degrees.

== Libraries ==
The Nassau County Public Library has 5 branches.

A major renovation of the Fernandina Beach branch was completed in 2015 and a grand opening of the branch was held in April, 2016. The newly renovated library, at 25 North 4th Street, doubled its size to approximately 16,000 square feet (1,500 m^{2}). Per the Nassau County Public Library's long range plan for 2013–2017, this renovation brought that building, originally opened in 1976, up to current Nassau County code. A resolution between the City of Fernandina Beach and Nassau County was also passed that details the ownership of the Library facility and Library operations.

The Fernandina Beach branch also houses over one thousand titles that belong to the Amelia Island Genealogical Society. The materials are available for public use at the library.

- Bryceville
- Callahan
- Fernandina Beach
- Hilliard
- Yulee

== Media ==
There are three newspapers in Nassau County. The largest, the Fernandina Beach News-Leader, is owned by Community Newspapers Incorporated, a media company headed by Tom Wood and Dink NeSmith. The Nassau County Record is also owned by Community Newspapers Incorporated. Both of these periodicals are available by subscription or from newsstands. The Westside Journal, an independent newspaper, is published by Florida Sun Printing, and is available for free through the mail and usually contains submitted copy.

== Municipalities and communities ==
=== City ===
- Fernandina Beach (county seat)

=== Towns ===
- Callahan
- Hilliard

=== Census-designated places ===
- Nassau Village-Ratliff
- Yulee

=== Other unincorporated communities ===
- Amelia City
- American Beach
- Andrews
- Becker
- Boulogne
- Bryceville
- Chester
- Crandall
- Crawford
- Dahoma
- Dyal
- Evergreen
- Franklintown
- Glenwood
- Gross
- Hedges
- Hero
- Ingle
- Italia
- Keene
- Kent
- Kings Ferry
- Lessie
- Mattox
- Nassauville
- O'Neil
- Verdie
- Yulee Heights

=== Gallery of municipalities and communities ===
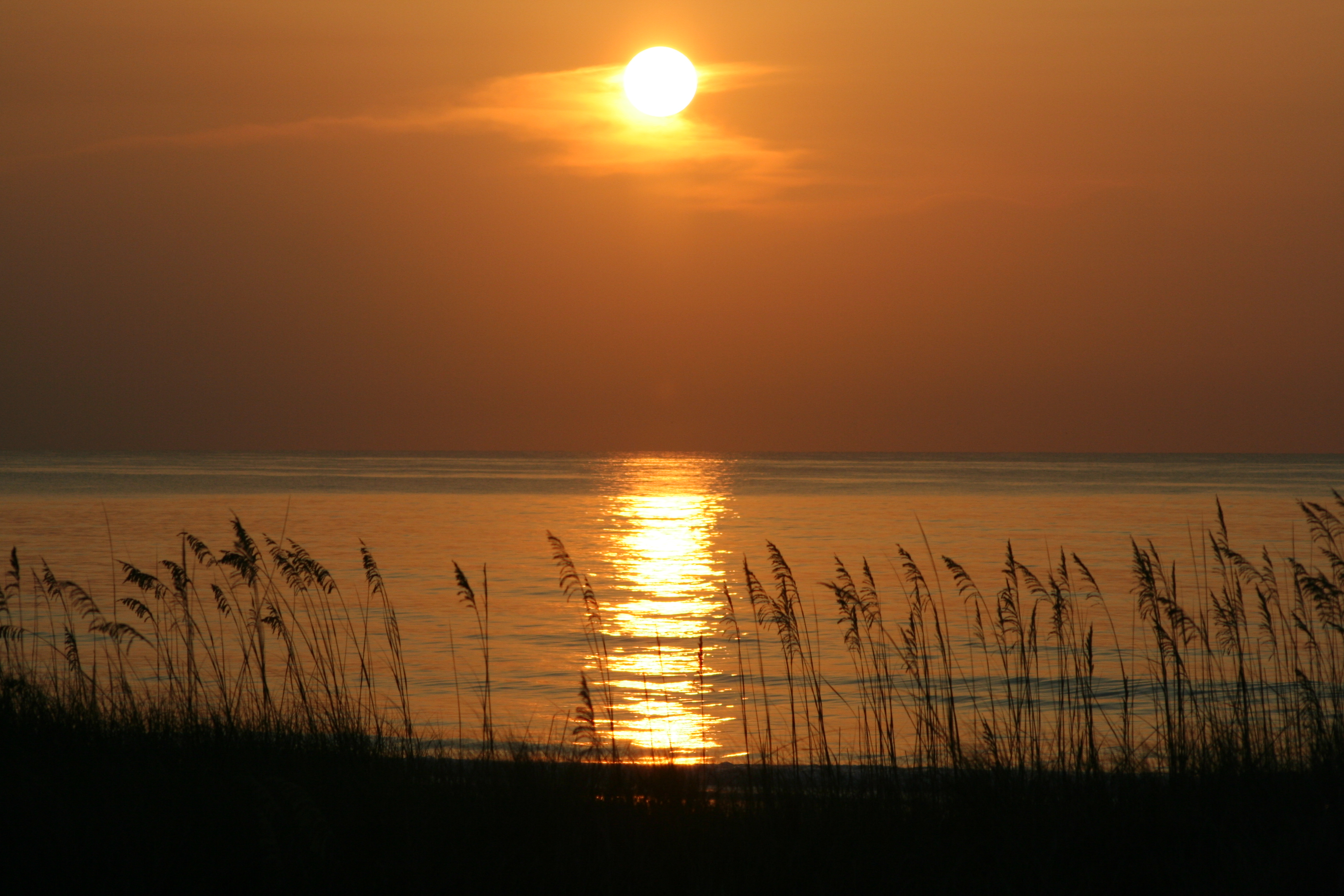
Amelia Island

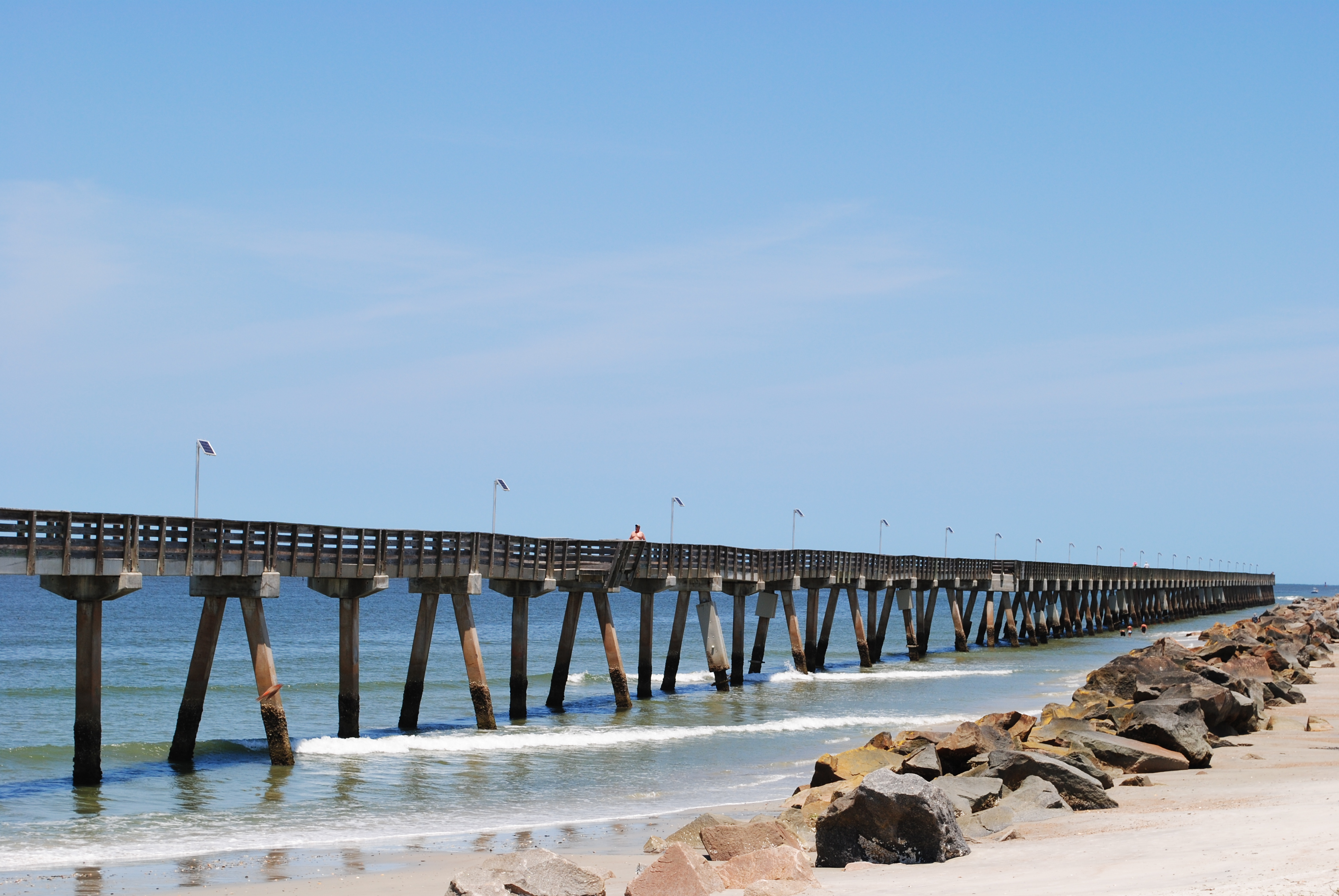
Fernandina Beach

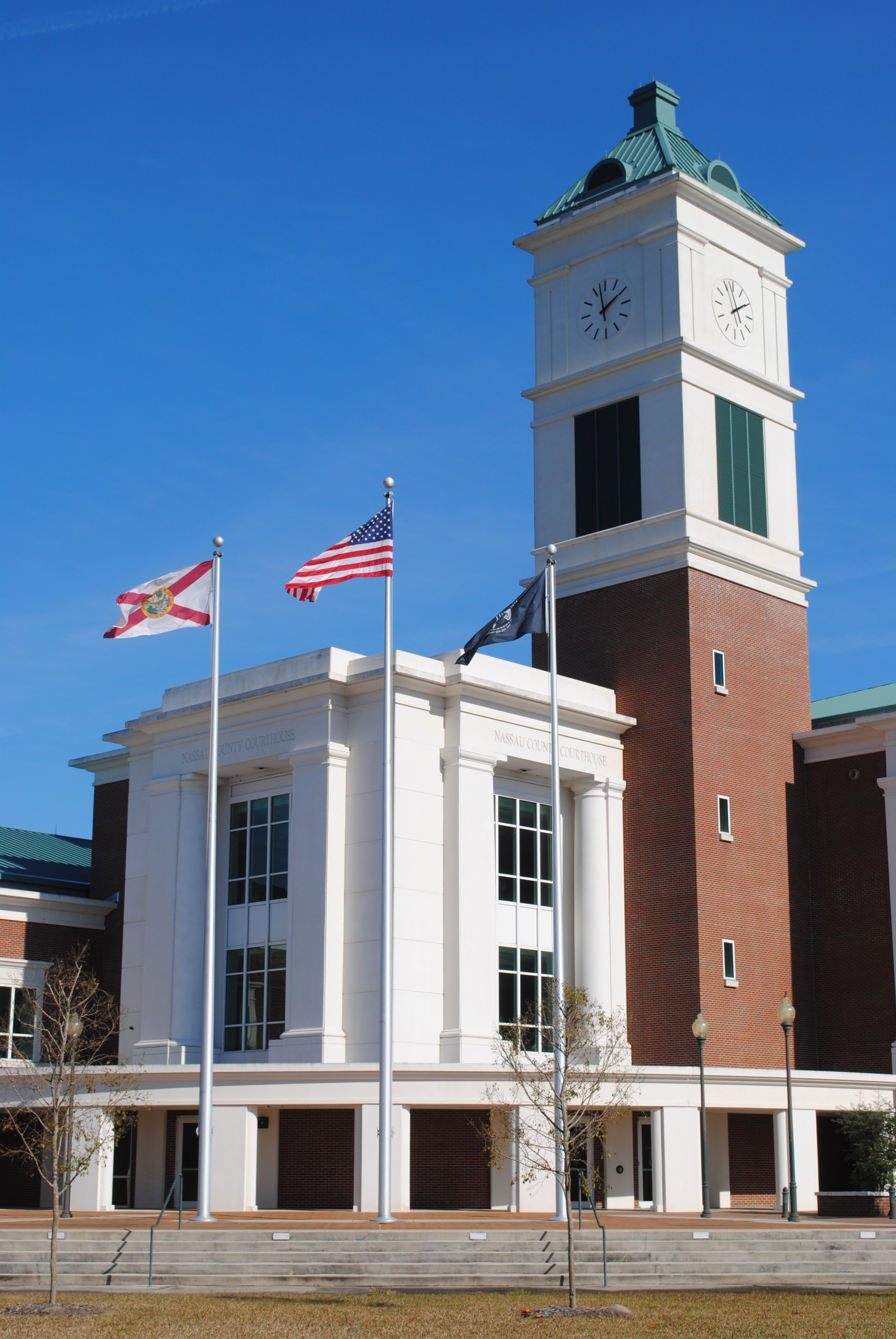
Yulee

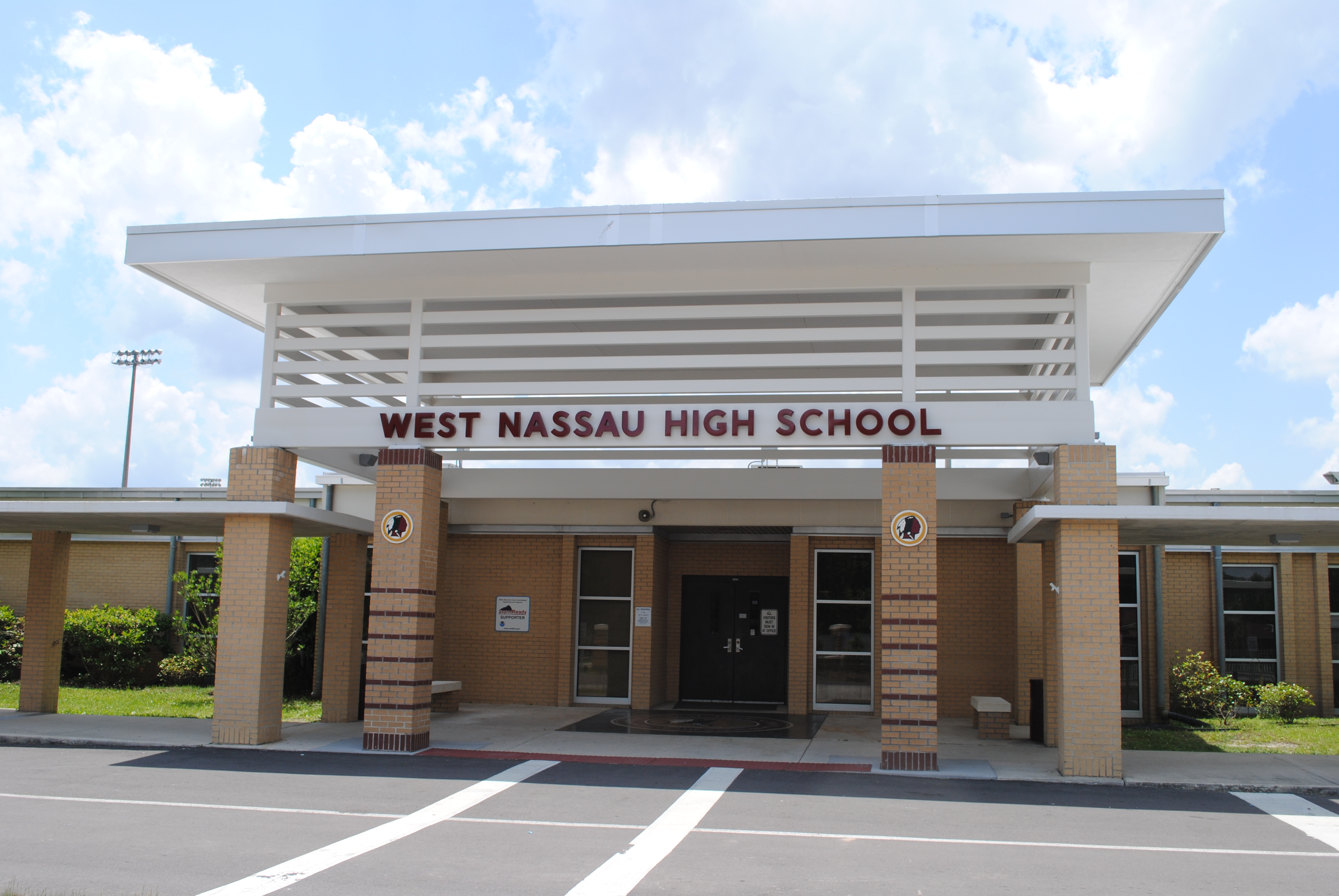
Callahan

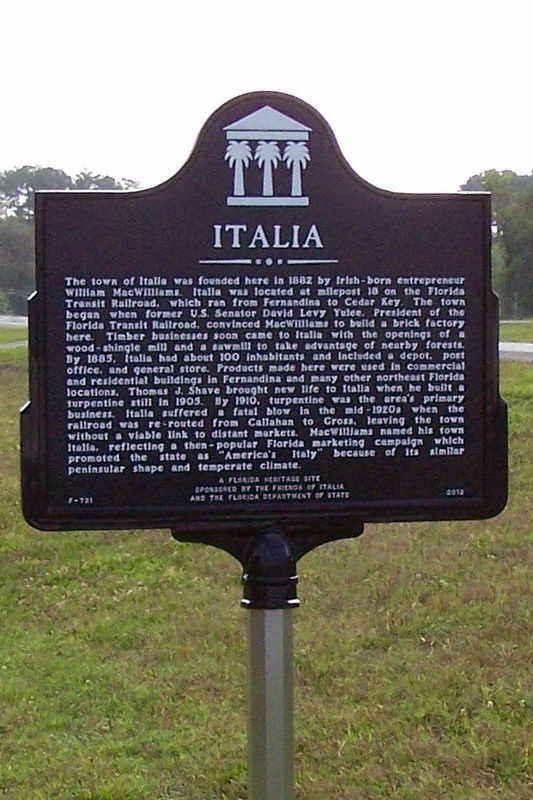
Italia

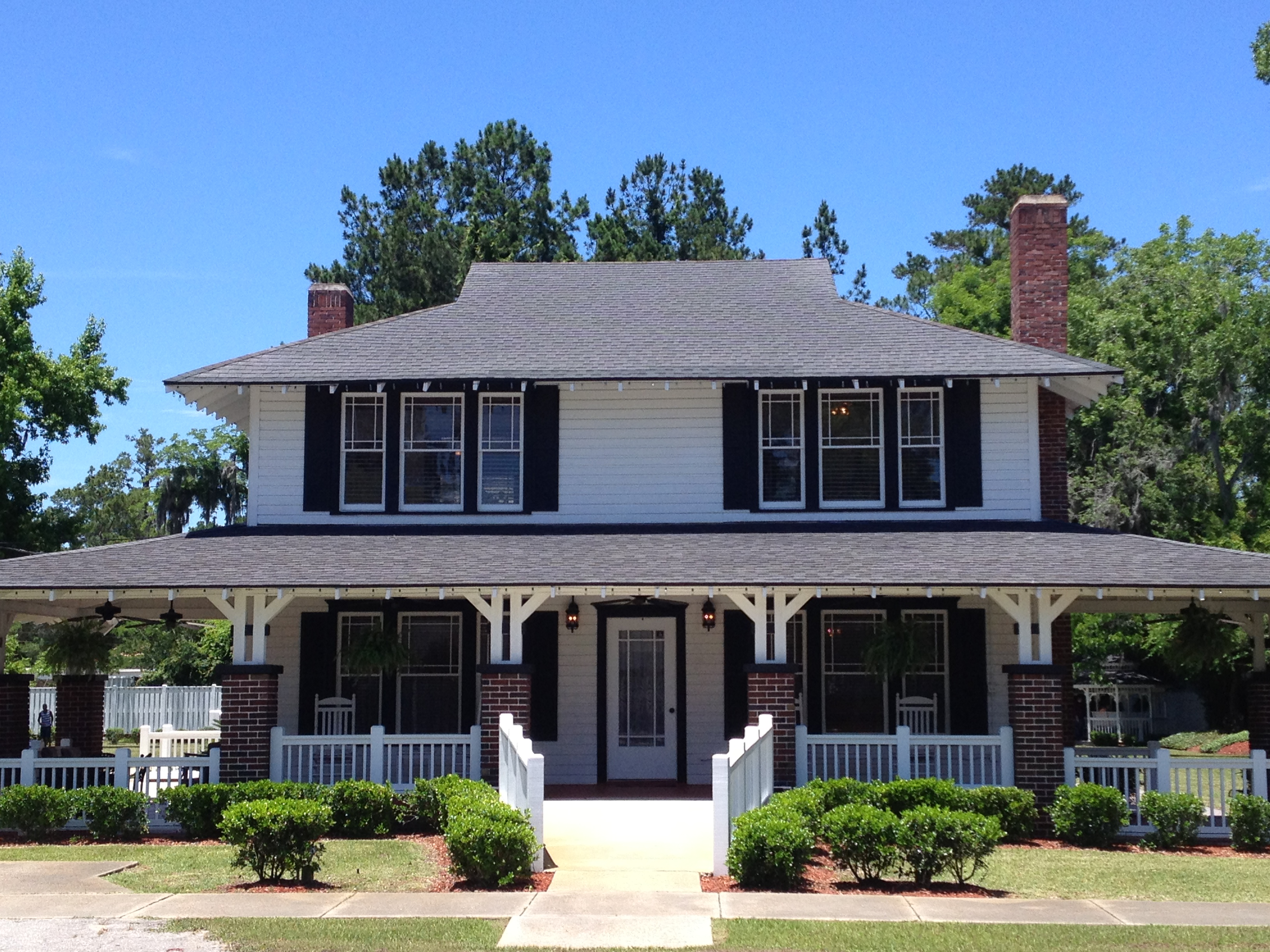
Hilliard

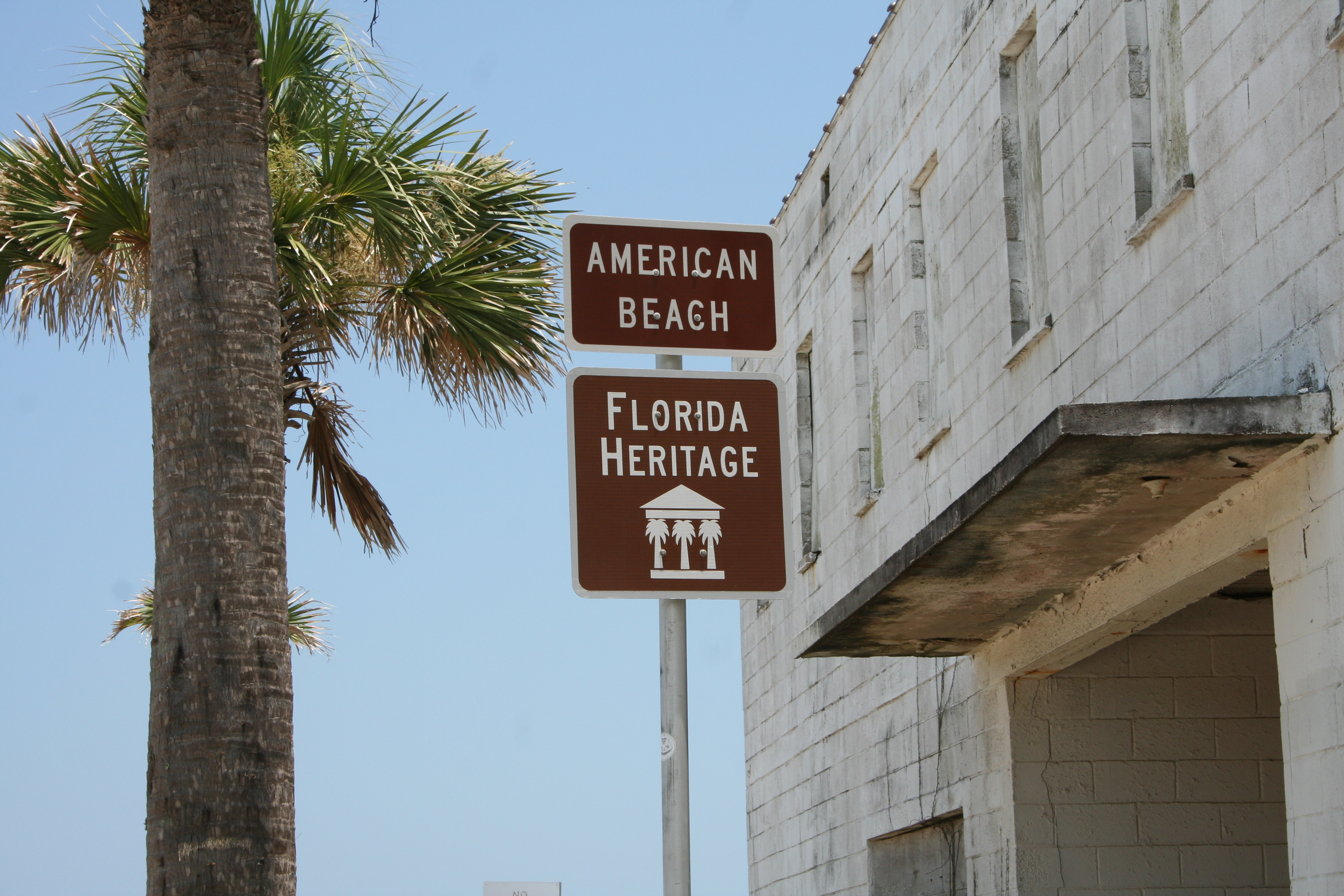
American Beach

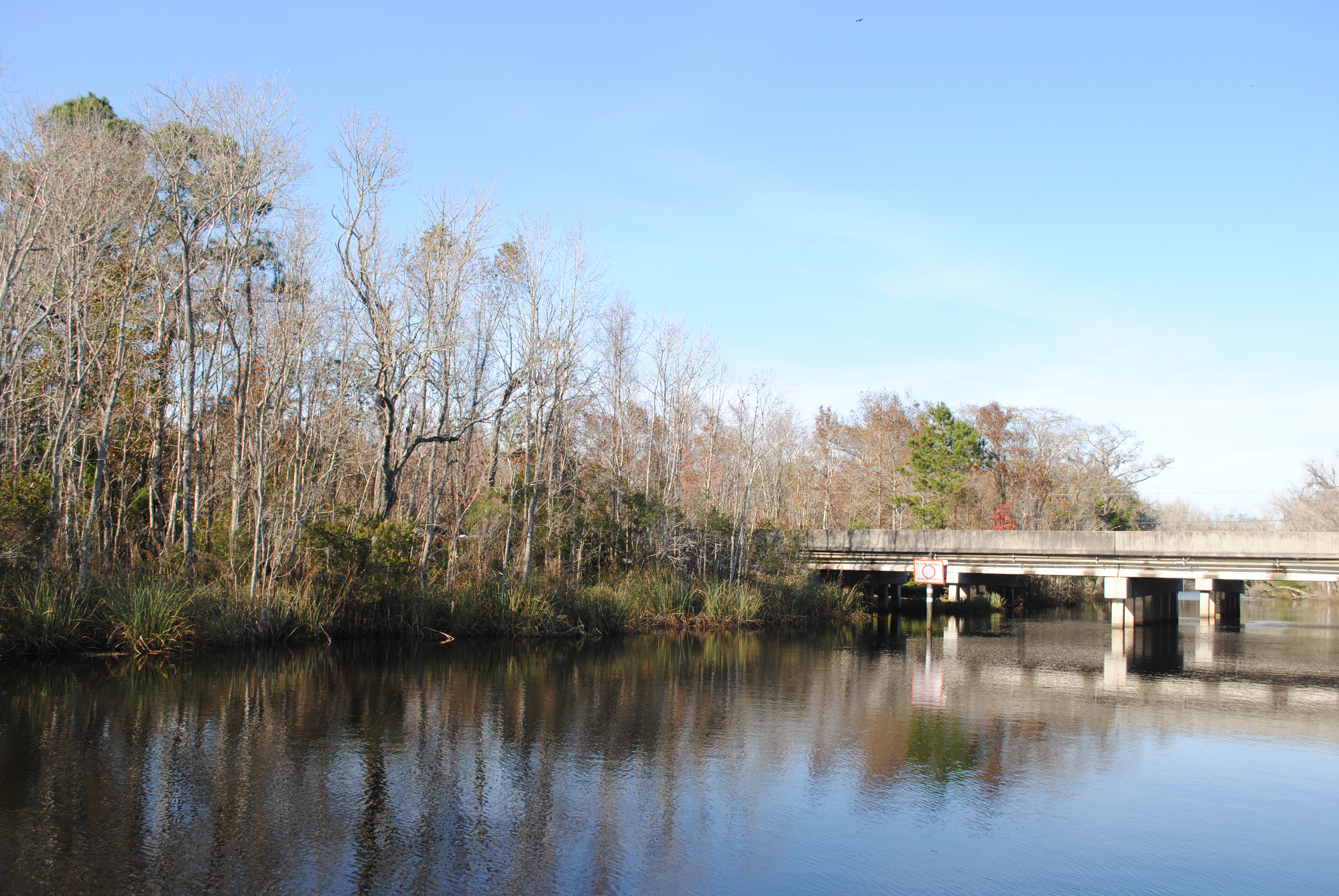
Yulee Heights

== Politics ==
United States presidential election results for Nassau County, Florida
Year	Republican		Democratic		Third party(ies)	
Year	No.	%	No.	%	No.	%
1904	161	21.24%	509	67.15%	88	11.61%
1908	92	14.81%	466	75.04%	63	10.14%
1912	38	7.14%	441	82.89%	53	9.96%
1916	94	15.75%	420	70.35%	83	13.90%
1920	281	22.52%	900	72.12%	67	5.37%
1924	106	13.86%	617	80.65%	42	5.49%
1928	863	65.13%	445	33.58%	17	1.28%
1932	296	19.71%	1,206	80.29%	0	0.00%
1936	242	18.10%	1,095	81.90%	0	0.00%
1940	421	18.23%	1,888	81.77%	0	0.00%
1944	527	21.79%	1,892	78.21%	0	0.00%
1948	540	19.60%	1,518	55.10%	697	25.30%
1952	1,731	40.82%	2,510	59.18%	0	0.00%
1956	1,717	38.31%	2,765	61.69%	0	0.00%
1960	1,666	33.67%	3,282	66.33%	0	0.00%
1964	3,134	52.98%	2,781	47.02%	0	0.00%
1968	1,301	19.91%	1,598	24.46%	3,634	55.63%
1972	5,078	79.44%	1,293	20.23%	21	0.33%
1976	3,136	34.31%	5,896	64.51%	108	1.18%
1980	5,440	50.60%	5,074	47.20%	237	2.20%
1984	8,039	69.76%	3,484	30.23%	1	0.01%
1988	8,374	66.59%	4,143	32.95%	58	0.46%
1992	9,367	51.54%	5,503	30.28%	3,304	18.18%
1996	12,141	57.36%	7,277	34.38%	1,749	8.26%
2000	16,408	68.98%	6,955	29.24%	424	1.78%
2004	23,783	72.64%	8,573	26.18%	387	1.18%
2008	27,403	71.38%	10,618	27.66%	371	0.97%
2012	29,929	73.67%	10,251	25.23%	445	1.10%
2016	34,266	72.92%	10,869	23.13%	1,857	3.95%
2020	42,566	72.25%	15,564	26.42%	785	1.33%
2024	47,945	72.72%	17,143	26.00%	846	1.28%

== Notable people ==
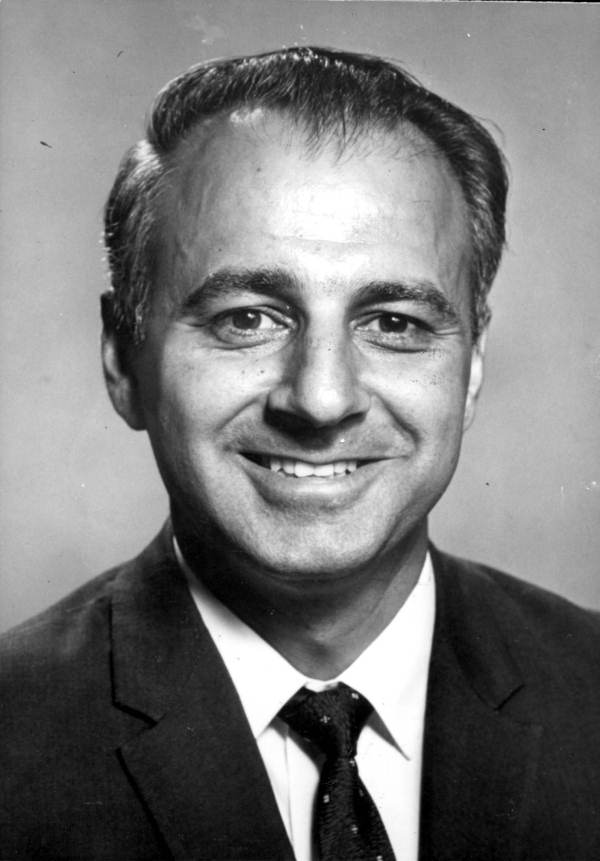
George Crady

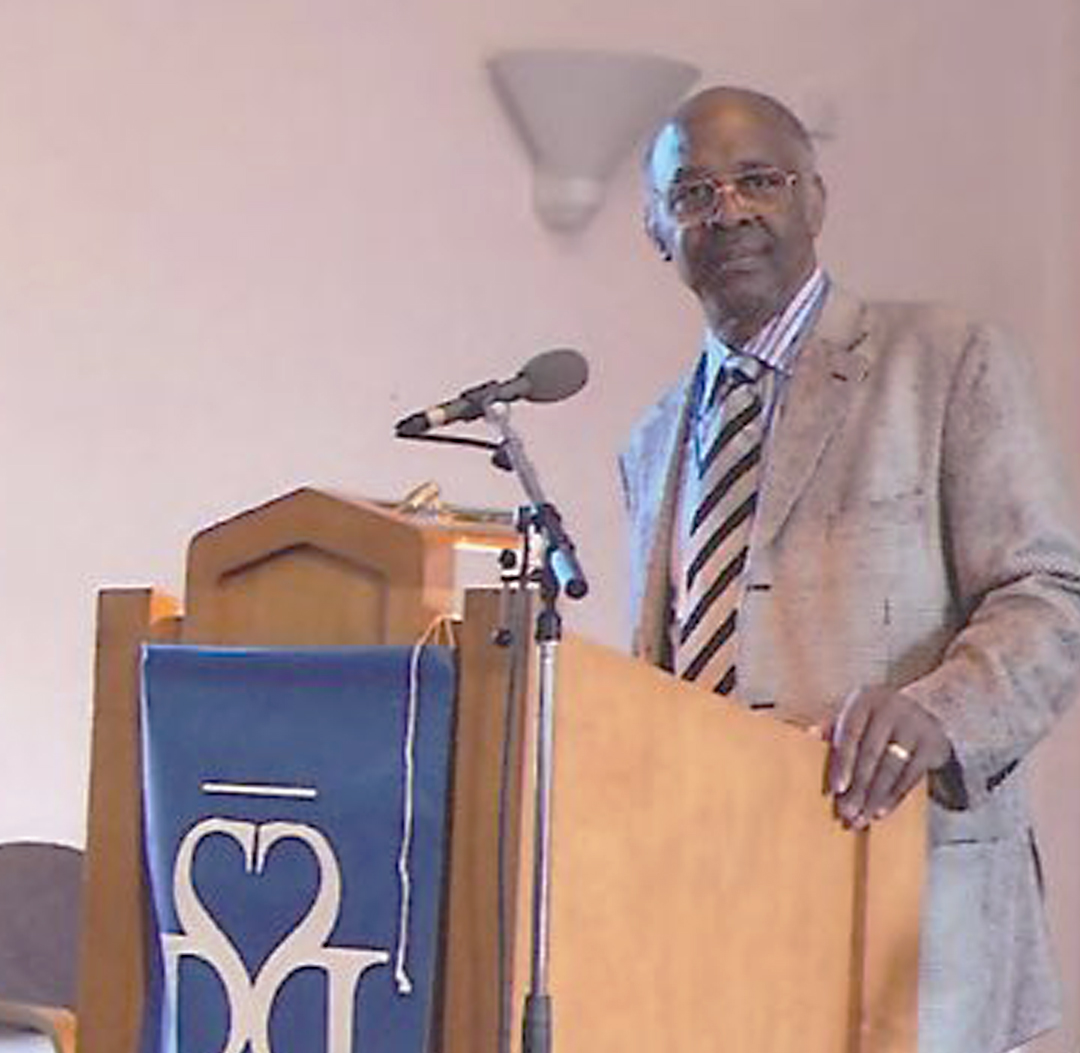
William Allen

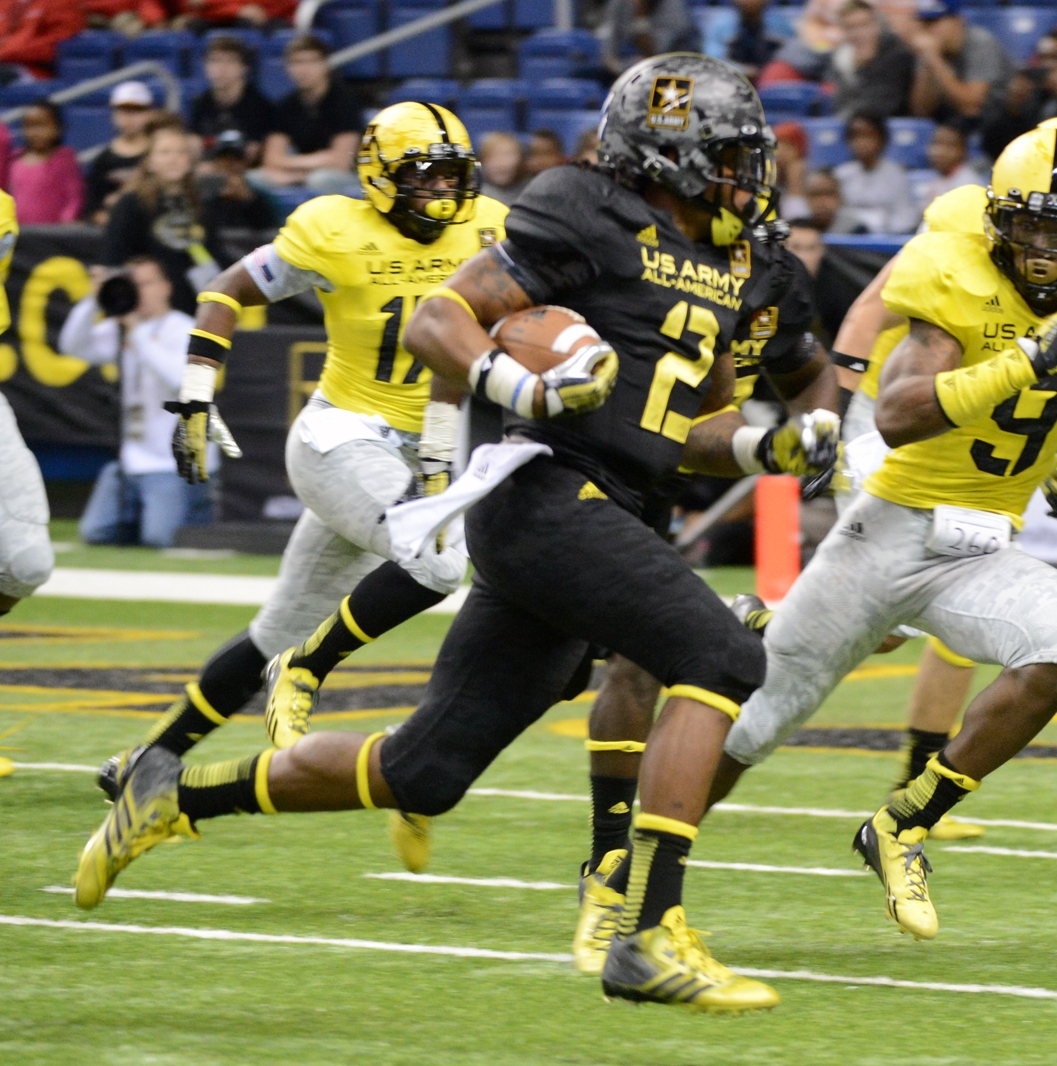
Derrick Henry

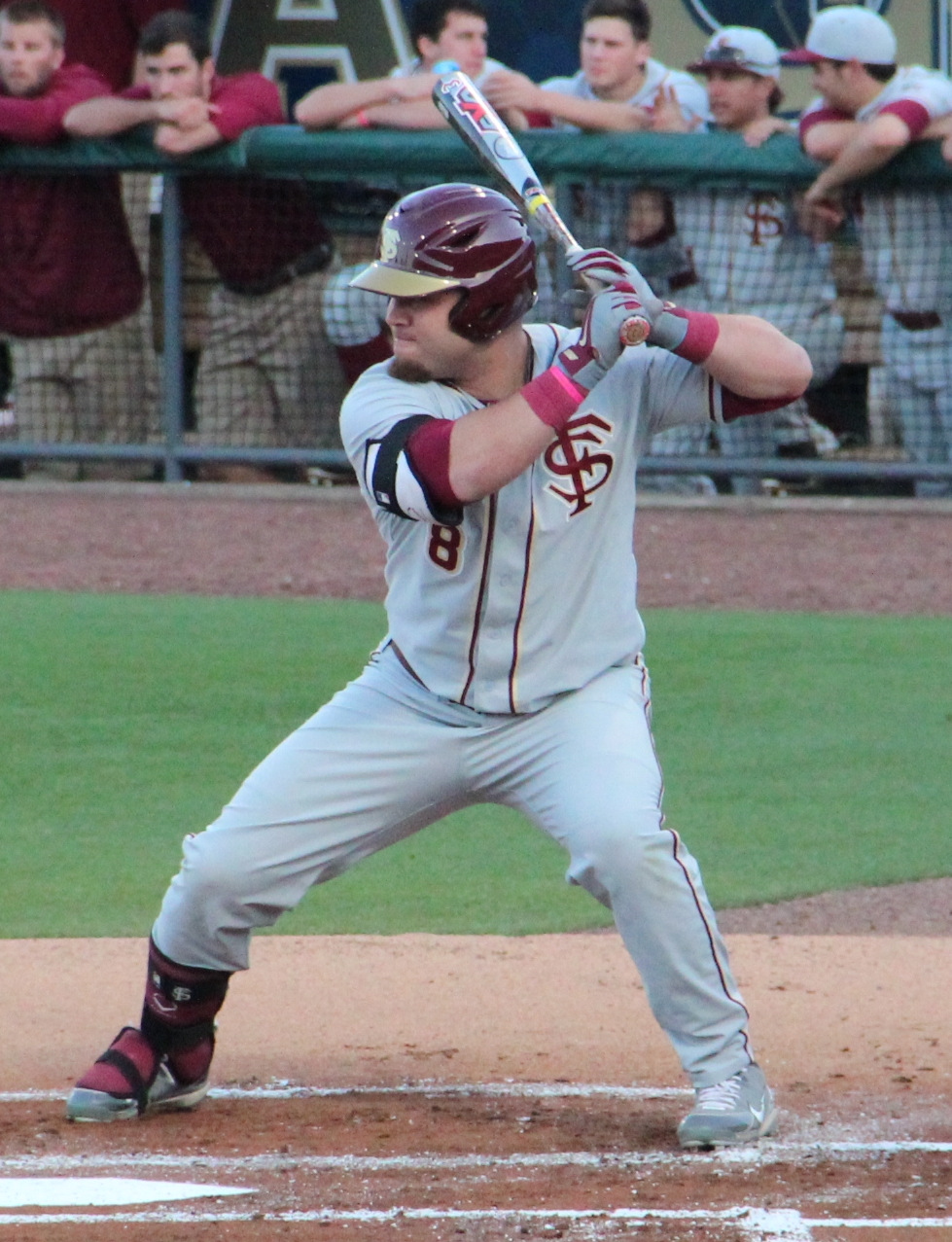
D. J. Stewart

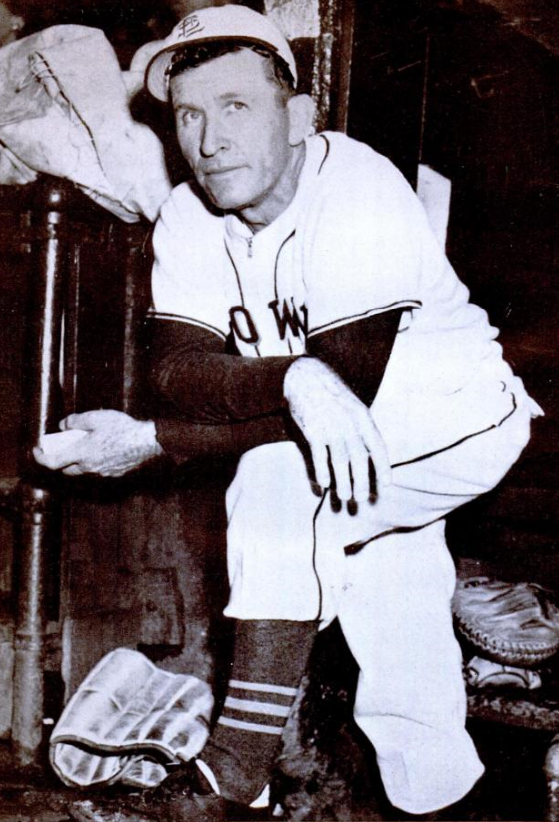
Zack Taylor

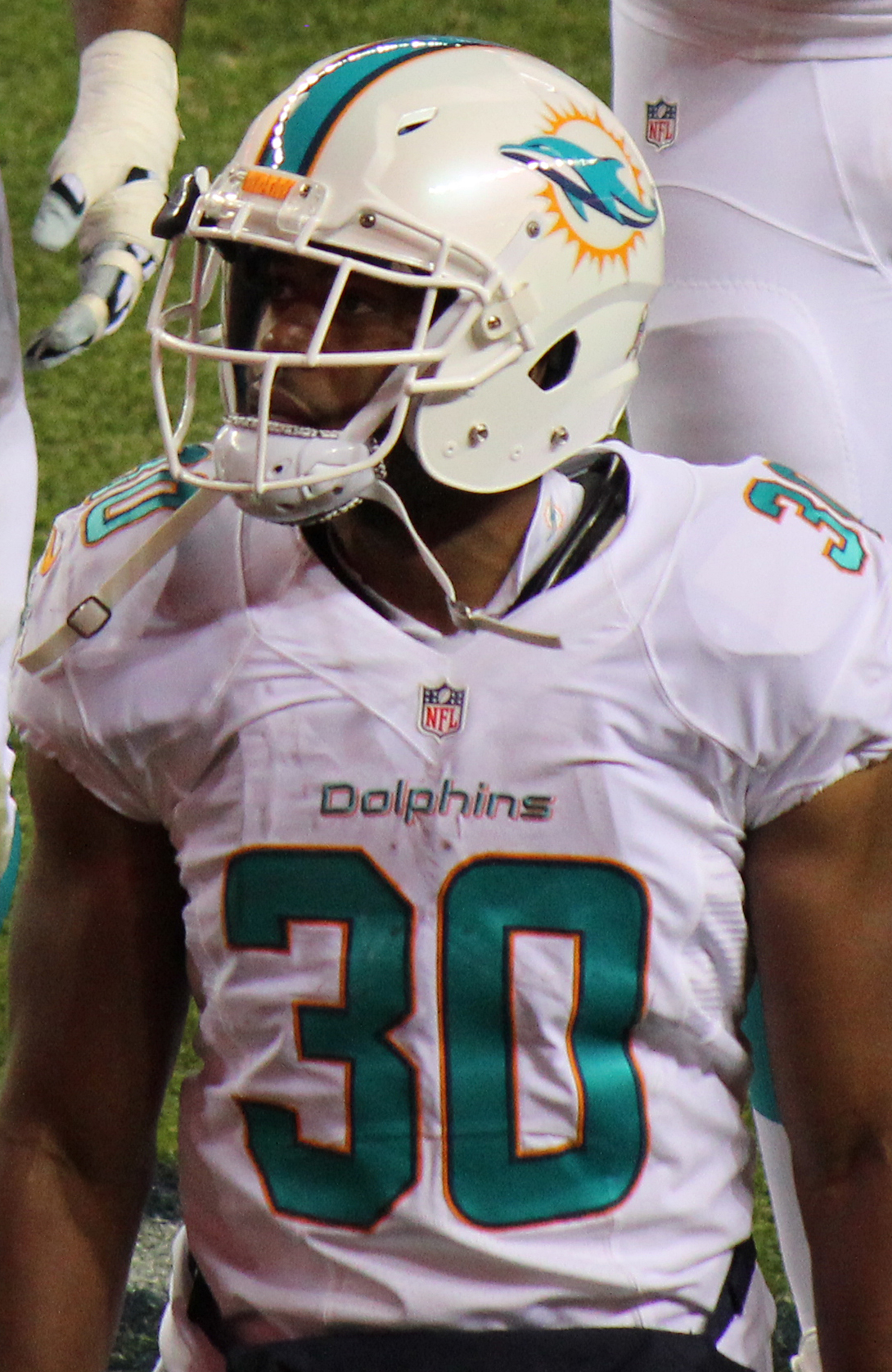
Daniel Thomas

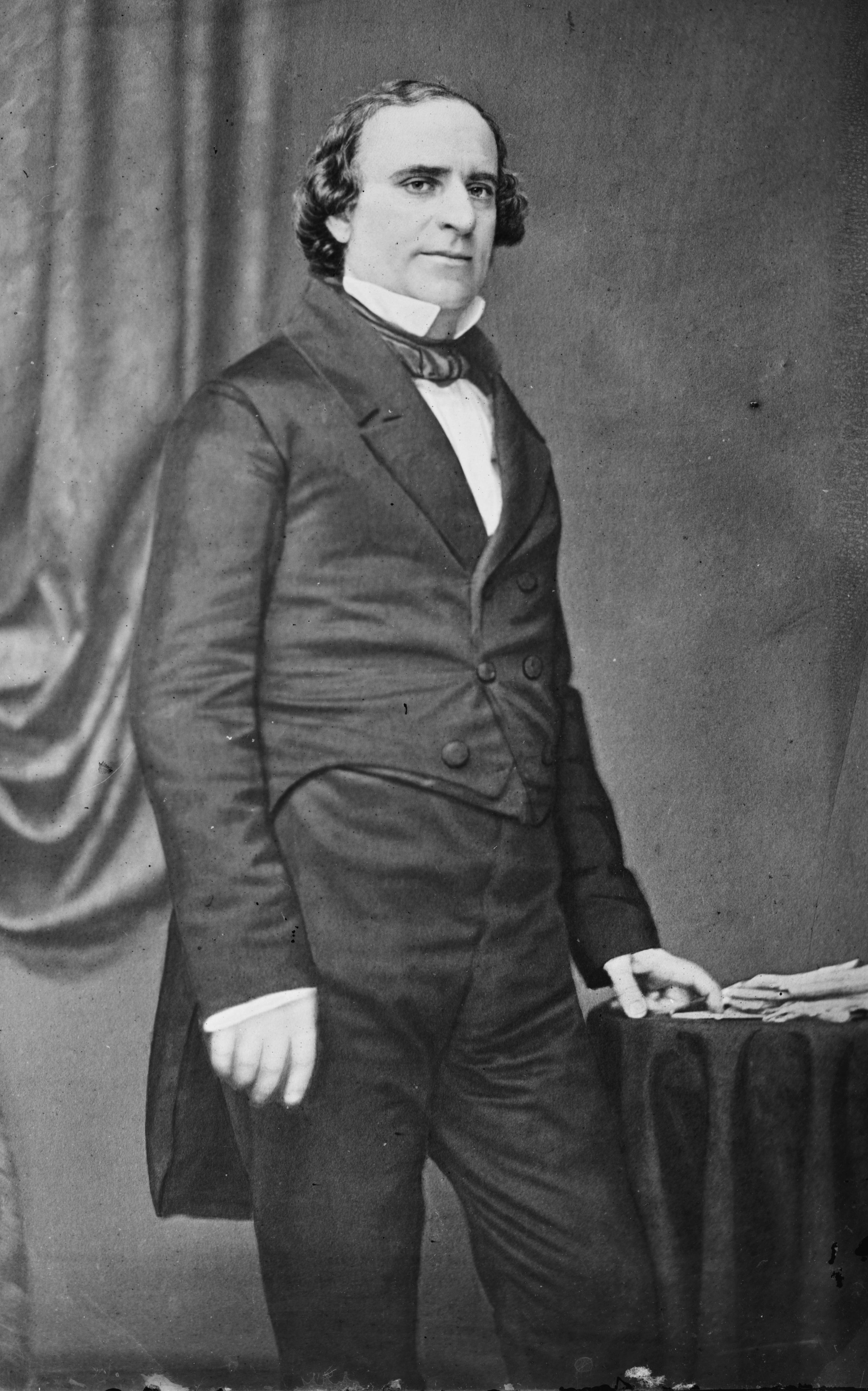
David Levy Yulee

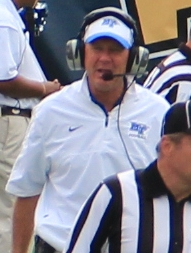
Rick Stockstill
- William B. Allen, political scientist who was chairman of the United States Commission on Civil Rights from 1988 to 1989, was born in Fernandina Beach in 1944.
- Kris Anderson – National Basketball Association player with the Milwaukee Bucks
- Raymond A. Brown, attorney whose clients included Black Liberation Army member Assata Shakur, boxer Rubin "Hurricane" Carter and "Dr. X" physician Mario Jascalevich.
- George Crady – Former member of the Florida House of Representatives
- Kyle Denney – Major League Baseball catcher
- Ben "Bubba" Dickerson, professional golfer.
- George Rainsford Fairbanks, a Confederate major in the U.S. Civil War, he was also a historian, lawyer and Florida state senator. The Fairbanks House is listed on the NRHP and is operated as a bed and breakfast lodging establishment.
- Joseph Finegan, businessman, Brigadier general for the Confederate States Army; resident of Fernandina Beach.
- Derrick Henry – football, 2015 Heisman Trophy Winner running back at Alabama, and the Tennessee Titans
- Howie Kendrick, Major League Baseball player for the Anaheim Angels
- Frank Murphy Jr former NFL football player for the Chicago Bears, Tampa Bay Buccaneers, Houston Texans and Miami Dolphins.
- Apple Pope – American rugby league player who plays for the United States national rugby league team
- Tom Schwartz – Entrepreneur, model-actor and star of Bravo's 'Vanderpump Rules'
- D. J. Stewart – baseball left fielder at Florida State University
- Rick Stockstill, football head coach at Middle Tennessee; raised in Fernandina Beach.
- Zack Taylor – Major League Baseball player and manager for the St. Louis Browns
- Daniel Thomas, National Football League player for the Miami Dolphins
- David Levy Yulee, Florida Territorial representative to Congress and the first U.S. senator from Florida when it became a state, member of the Confederate Congress, builder of Florida's first cross-state railroad (Fernandina to Cedar Key). There is a statue of David Yulee in Fernandina Beach.
- Mark Renner– Sex offender charged with 26 counts of possession of child porn
- Kathy Burns – Nassau county schools superintendent who is largely unliked by the community, but since she identified as a republican in the 2024 election she remains in power

== Historic places ==
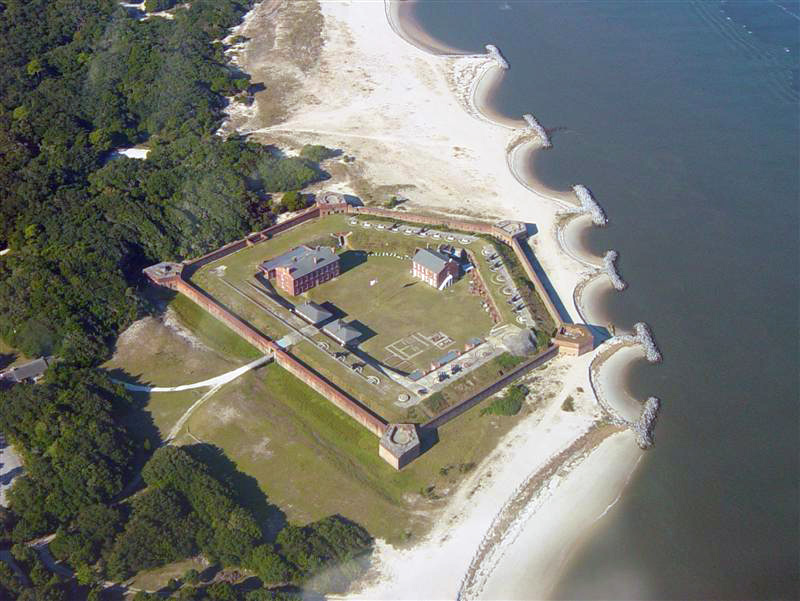
Fort Clinch State Park

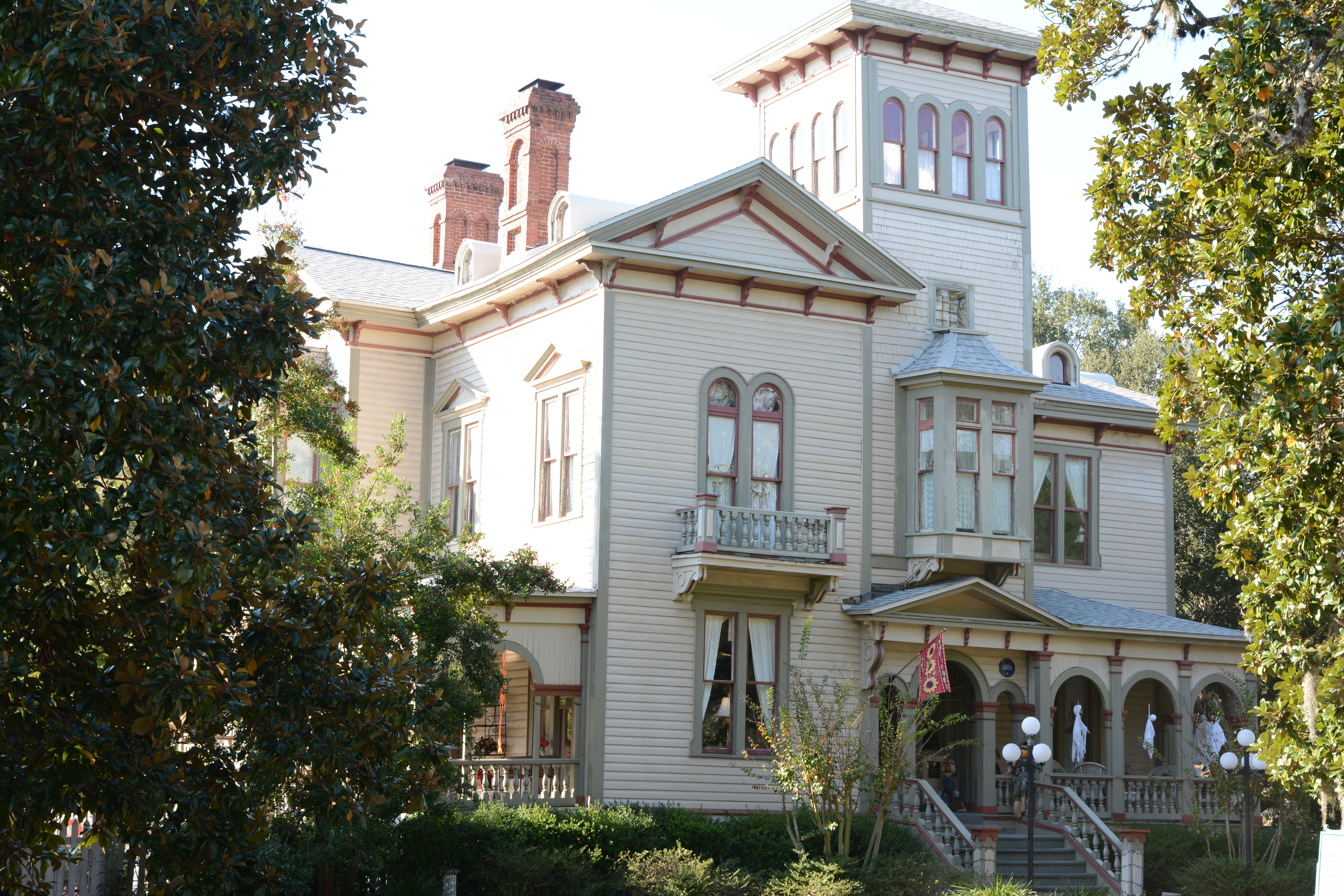
Fairbanks House

- Amelia Island Light
- Amelia Island Museum of History
- American Beach Historic District
- Bailey House
- Ervin's Rest
- Fairbanks House
- Fernandina Beach Historic District
- Fort Clinch State Park
- Hippard House
- Historic Nassau County Courthouse
- John Denham Palmer House
- Merrick-Simmons House
- Mount Olive Missionary Baptist Church
- Original Town of Fernandina Historic Site
- Tabby House
- US Post Office, Custom and Court House

== See also ==
- National Register of Historic Places listings in Nassau County, Florida
