= Fernandina Beach Municipal Airport =

Airport in Florida, U.S.

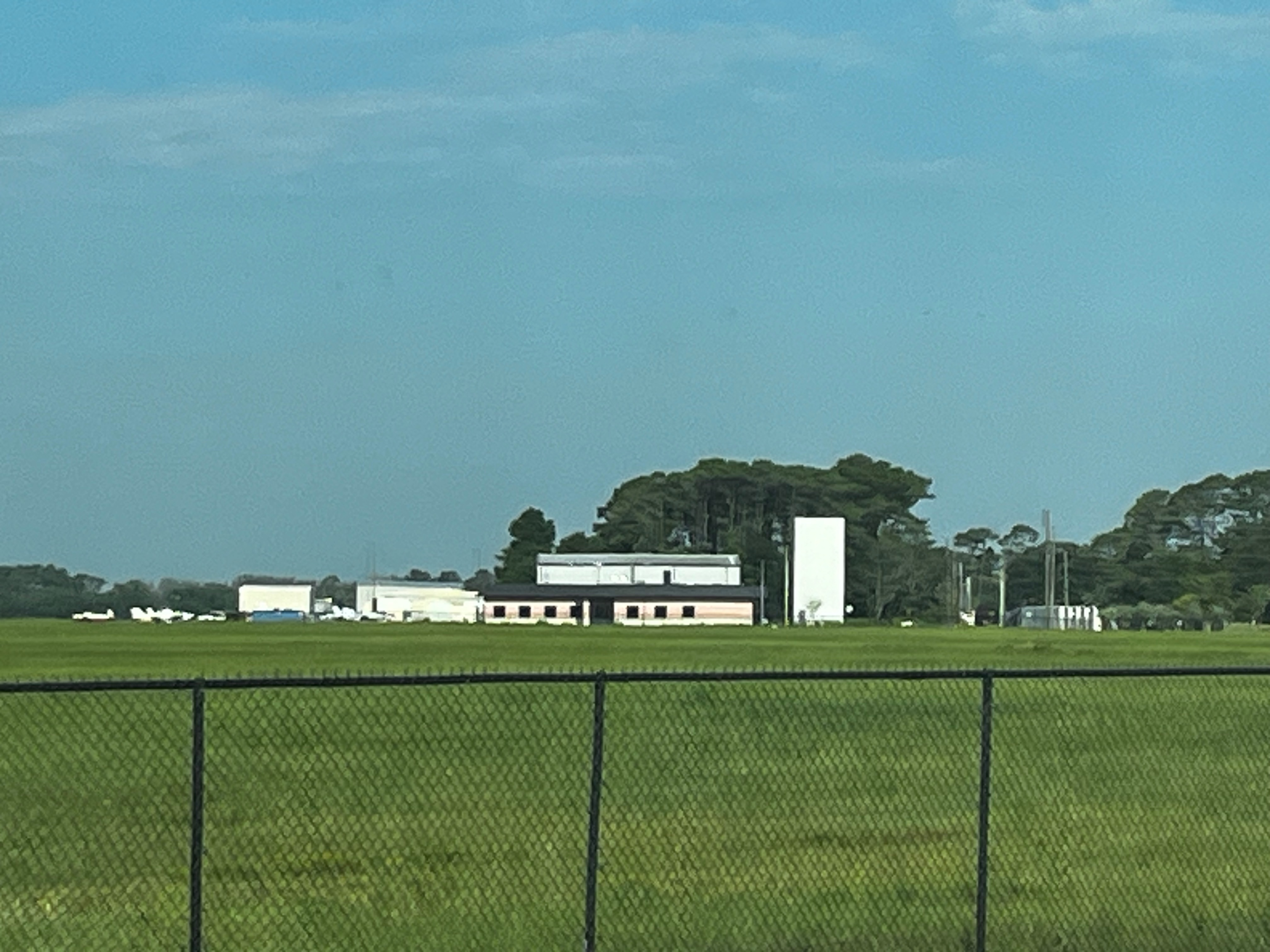
- IATA: none; ICAO: KFHB; FAA LID: FHB

Summary
- Airport type: Public
- Owner: City of Fernandina Beach
- Serves: Fernandina Beach, Florida
- Elevation AMSL: 16 ft (4.9 m)
- Coordinates: 30°36′43″N 081°27′40″W
- Website: www.fbfl.us/...
- Interactive map of Fernandina Beach Municipal Airport

Runways
Direction	Length		Surface
Direction	ft	m	Surface
4/22	5,301	1,616	Asphalt
13/31	5,152	1,570	Asphalt
9/27	5,000	1,524	Concrete

Statistics (2018)
- Aircraft operations (year ending 2/7/2018): 47,000
- Based aircraft: 69
- Source: Federal Aviation Administration

Fernandina Beach Municipal Airport (ICAO: KFHB, FAA LID: FHB, formerly 55J) is a city-owned public-use airport located on Amelia Island three nautical miles (6 km) south of the central business district of Fernandina Beach, a city in Nassau County, Florida, United States. It is designated as a reliever airport for Jacksonville International Airport.

Fernandina Beach Municipal Airport was developed as a training facility by the United States Navy during World War II, serving as Outlying Field Fernadina Beach (OLF Fernadina Beach) to the Naval Air Station Jacksonville complex. The airport was transferred to the City of Fernandina Beach in 1946 and is designated as a general aviation reliever airport for Jacksonville International Airport. It is occasionally used as a practice airfield by U.S. Navy helicopters from NAS Jacksonville and Naval Station Mayport and by U.S. Coast Guard and Florida Army National Guard helicopters from Cecil Field.

== Facilities and aircraft ==
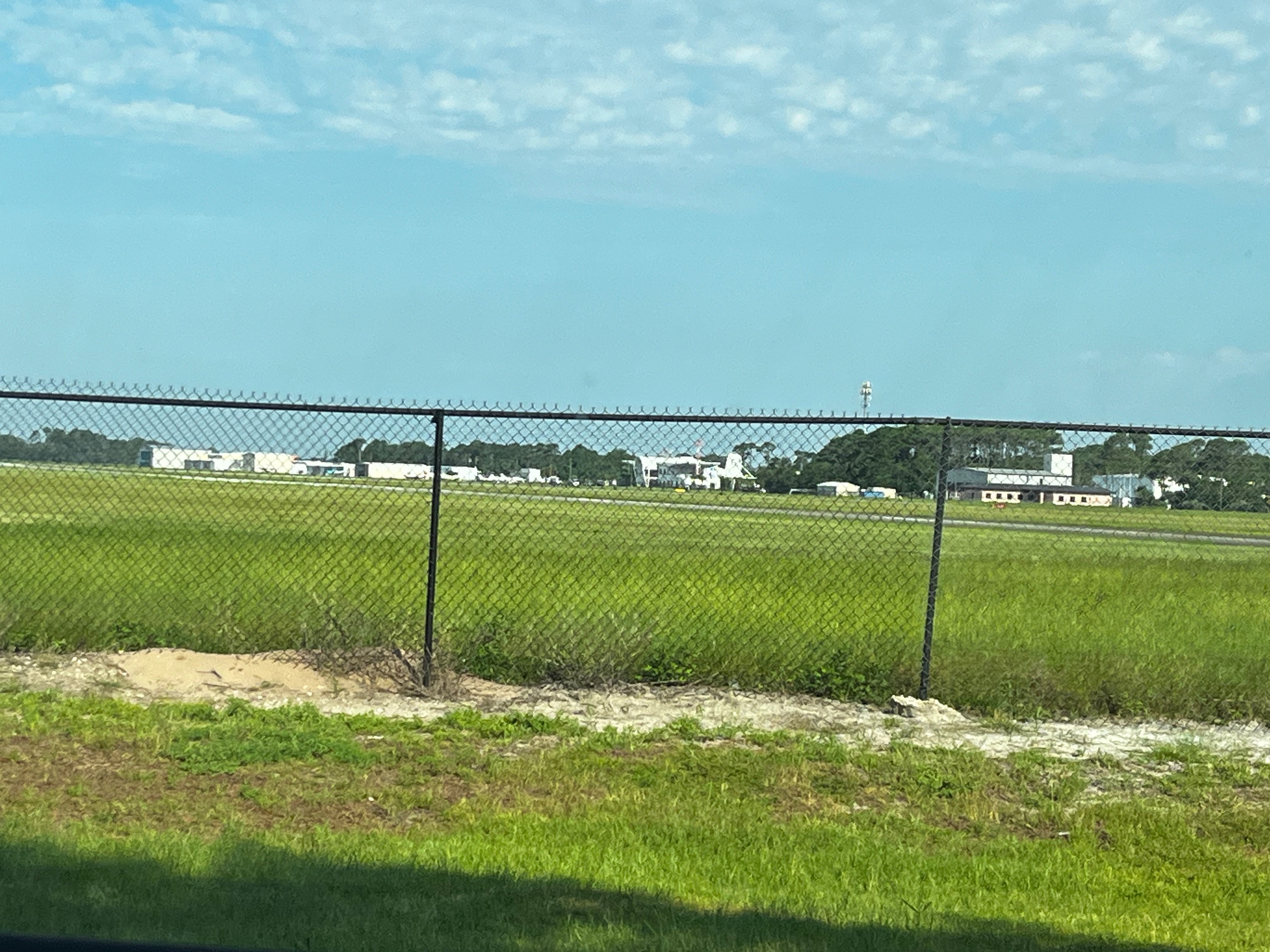
View of runway from road

Fernandina Beach Municipal Airport covers an area of 848 acres (343 ha) at an elevation of 16 feet (5 m) above mean sea level. It has three paved runways: 4/22 is 5,301 by 100 feet (1,616 x 30 m); 13/31 is 5,152 by 100 feet (1,570 x 30 m); 9/27 is 5,000 by 100 feet (1,524 x 30 m).

For the 12-month period ending February 7, 2018, the airport had 47,000 aircraft operations, an average of 129 per day: 95% general aviation, 3% air taxi and <1% military. At that time there were 69 aircraft based at this airport: 63 single-engine, and 6 multi-engine.

== See also ==
- List of airports in Florida
