= Evergreen, Florida =

Unincorporated community in Florida, U.S.

Evergreen is an unincorporated community in Nassau County, Florida, United States. It is located on County Road 108, near the center of the county.

== Geography ==
Evergreen is located at 30°42′00″N 81°45′08″W.

=== Area roads ===
Evergreen lies along a large curve in County Road 108, which is the only paved road in the area. Sand Hill Road intersects from the south and travels south. There are several driveways which also have road names appearing on a map of the area.
