= Kings Ferry, Florida =

Kings Ferry
- Interactive map of Kings Ferry
- Country: United States
- State: Florida

Kings Ferry is an unincorporated community in Nassau County, Florida, United States. It is at the northern ends of County Road 115A and County Road 121A, near the center of the county.

== Geography ==
Kings Ferry is located at 30°47′06″N 81°50′21″W (30.785, -81.8392) on the south side of the St. Marys River.
