= Florida Welcome Center =

Location of Florida Welcome Centers
1 I-10
2 US 231
3 Capitol
4 I-75
5 I-95

A Florida Welcome Center is a tourist information house located at Florida's major entry points. These centers offer incoming visitors a range of information on travel, highways, sports, climate, accommodations, cities, outdoor recreation, and local attractions. Since its launch in 1949, over 91.5 million visitors have stopped at the centers. Approximately 1.35 million visitors have stopped at the centers in 2025.

== History ==
Florida was one of the first states to establish highway welcome centers. State leaders noticed the establishment of the Dixie Highway in the 1920s routed travelers as far north as Michigan to the state. The first welcome center opened on November 4, 1949, located on US 17 near Yulee. The welcome centers were operated by the State Road Department, a precursor to the Florida Department of Transportation (FDOT). In 1955, operations were turned over to the Florida Development Commission (Florida Department of Commerce).

The success of the first welcome center led to additional welcome centers on US 1 (near Hilliard), US 41 (near Jasper), US 231 (north of Marianna), US 90 (west of Pensacola), and US 19 in Tallahassee.

Florida Welcome Centers serve free orange and grapefruit juice.

== Locations ==
The Florida Welcome Centers are operated by Visit Florida, the official tourism promotion corporation for the state. There are five official welcome centers. From west to east, they are I-10 (Pensacola), US 231 (Campbellton), Capitol (Tallahassee), I-75 (Jennings), and I-95 (Yulee).

Florida also had a marine welcome center for yachts and boats in Fernandina Beach on the Intracoastal Waterway. The marine welcome center opened in January 1963 and was phased out in the 1980s.

== Gallery ==
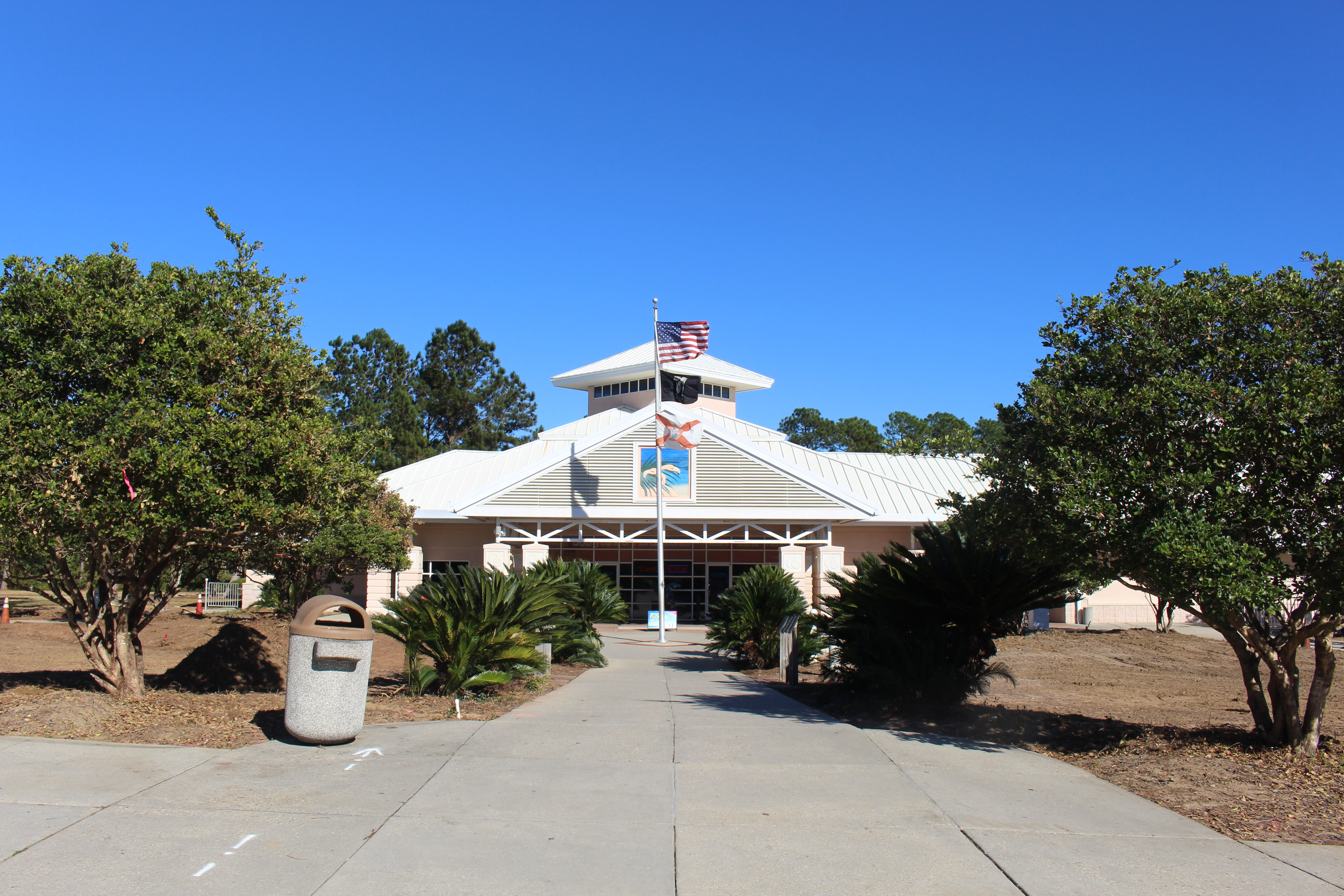
Welcome Center in Pensacola off of Interstate 10.

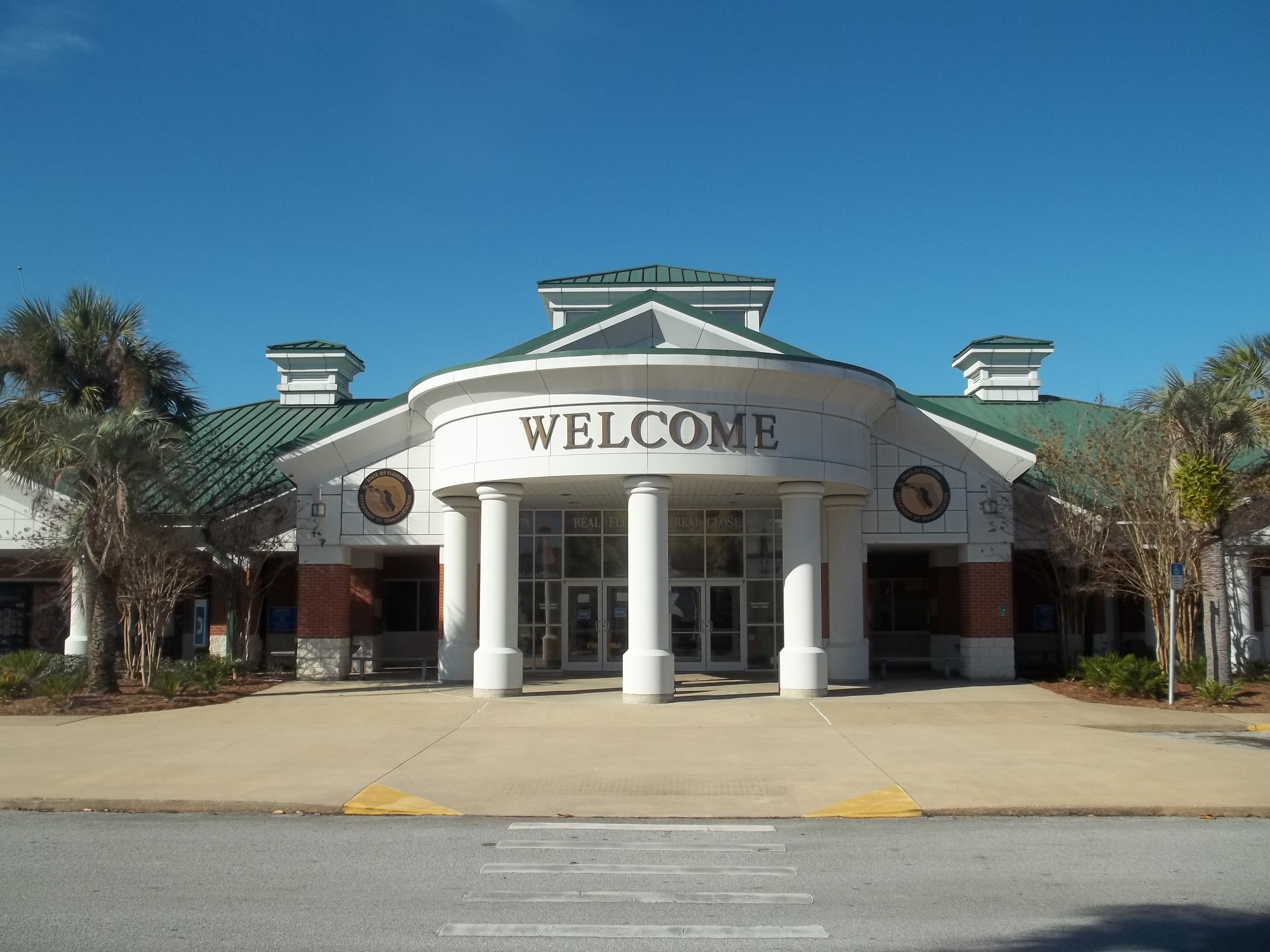
Welcome Center in Campbellton off of U.S. Route 231.

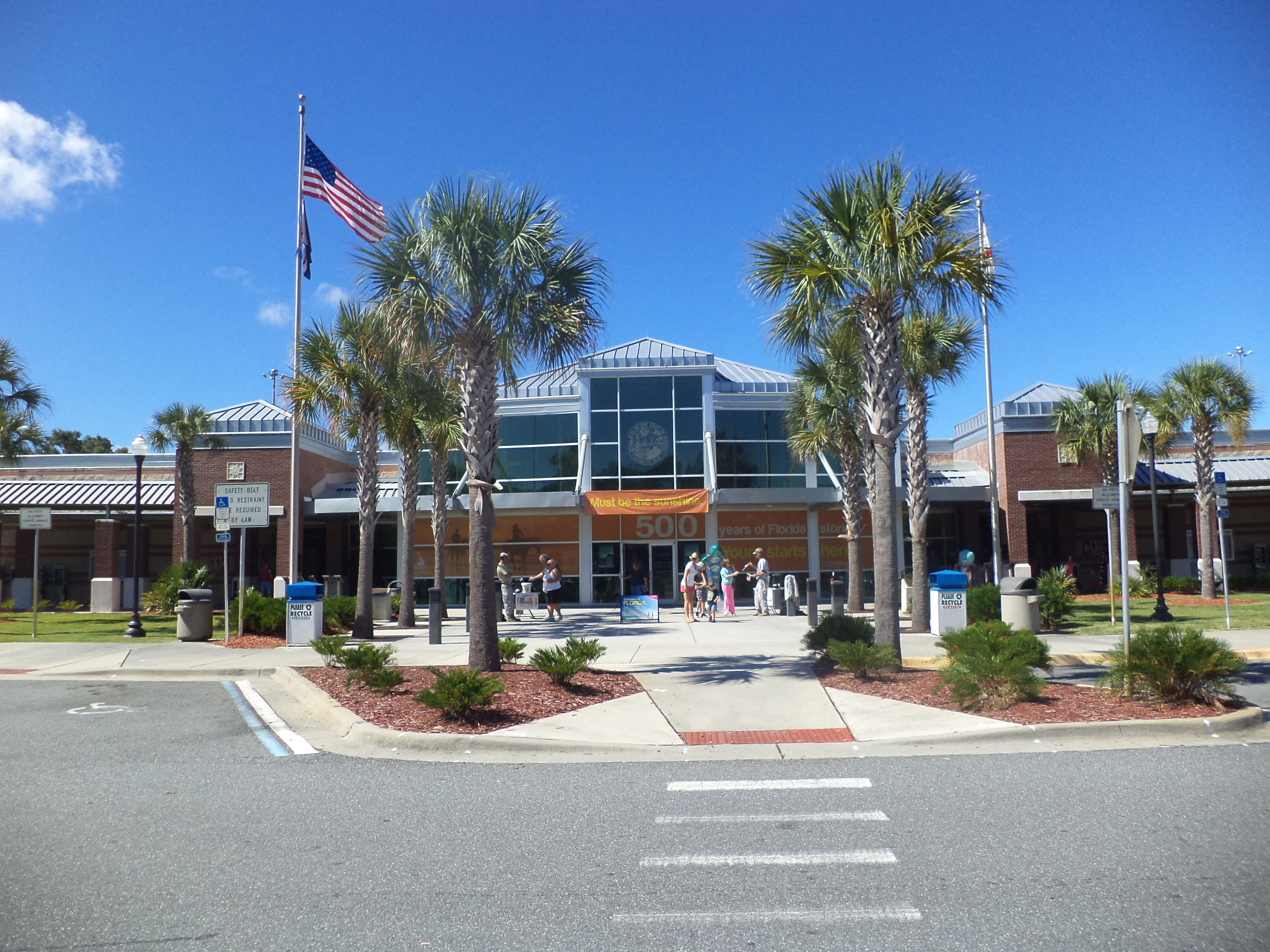
Welcome Center in Jennings, Florida off of Interstate 75.

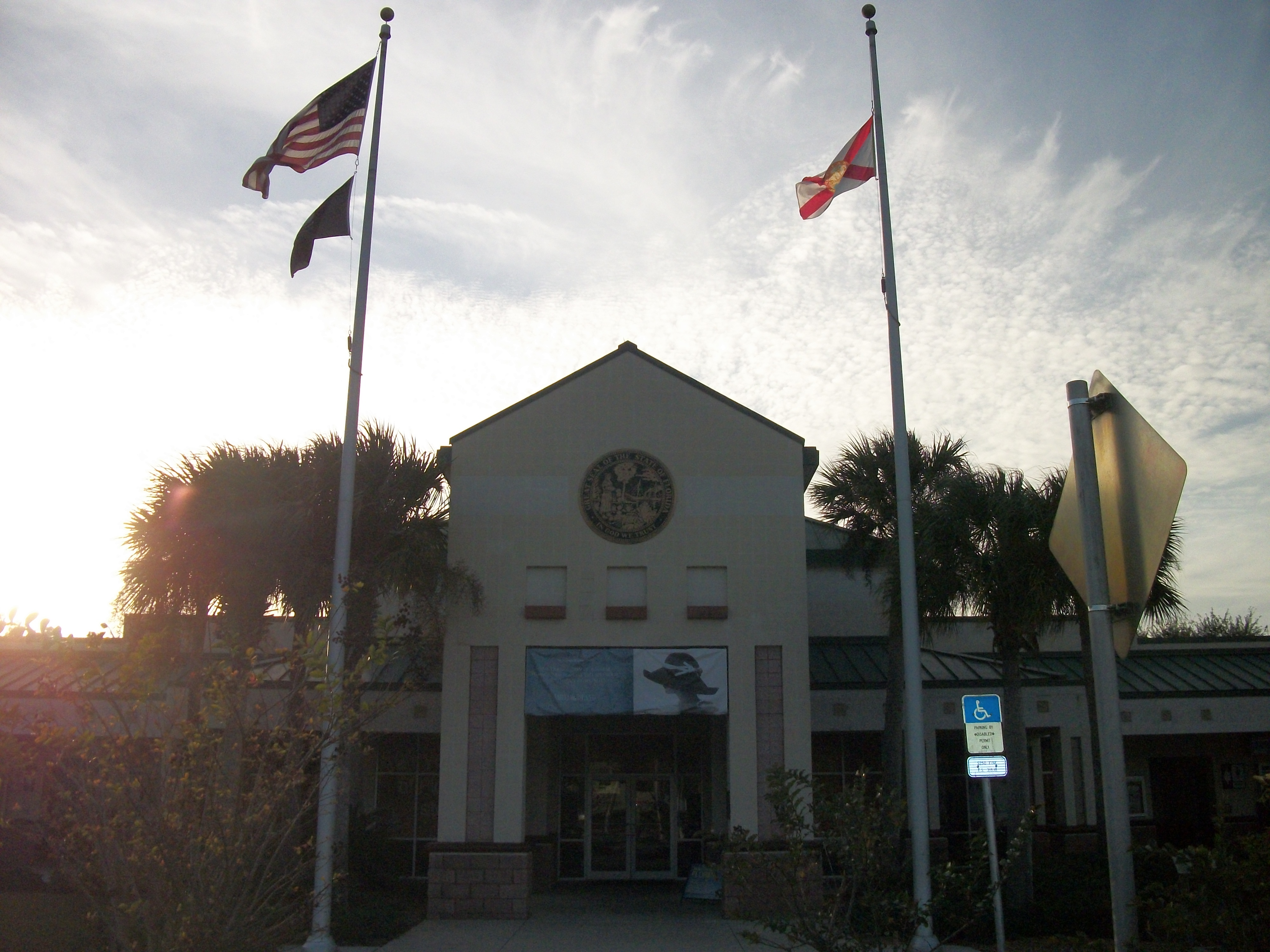
Welcome Center in Yulee off of Interstate 95.
