= Visit Florida =

Visit Florida (stylized as VISIT FLORIDA) is Florida's official tourism marketing corporation, serving as Florida's official source for travel planning to visitors across the globe. Visit Florida operates as a nonprofit corporation, it was created as a public/private partnership by the Florida Legislature in 1996.

== History and operations ==
Visit Florida was created in 1996 by the Florida Legislature as a public-private-partnership. Tourism is the state's largest industry and was responsible for welcoming 122 million visitors in 2021. Based on an economic impact study in 2018, Florida visitors spent $112 billion and supported 1.5 million Florida jobs. According to the state's Office of Economic and Demographic Research, for every $1 the state invests in Visit Florida, $2.15 in tax revenue is generated.

Each year, the Florida Legislature appropriates public funding to be allocated for tourism marketing. Visit Florida is required to match public funds, which is done by actively recruiting the state's tourism industry to invest as Partners through cooperative advertising campaigns, promotional programs, and many other marketing ventures. Through this public/private partnership, the organization serves more than 12,000 tourism industry businesses, including major strategic alliance partnerships with Busch Gardens Tampa, Disney Destinations, The Hertz Corporation, LEGOLAND Florida Resort, SeaWorld Parks & Resorts Orlando, Simon Shopping Destinations, and Universal Orlando Resort.

Visit Florida facilitates tourism industry participation in the domestic and international travel trade and consumer shows, as well as media missions to the top global visitor markets. It also works closely with travel agents, tour operators, meeting and event planners, and is responsible for operating five Florida Welcome Centers.

The Florida Commission on Tourism is the public/private partnership responsible for the vitality and growth of Florida’s tourism industry. Promoting Florida as the premier travel destination, both domestically and internationally, is the major focus of the Commission’s direct support organization, VISIT FLORIDA.

== Corporate information ==
Visit Florida has 136 full and part-time positions in Florida and an international team of contracted staff covering Canada, China, India, Germany, Latin America, and the United Kingdom. Visit Florida's corporate office is located at 2540 W. Executive Center Circle, Suite 200, Tallahassee, Florida 32301.

== See also ==
- Florida tourism industry
