= Science First =

Science education product manufacturer

Science First, official name Morris & Lee, is a science education product manufacturer based in Yulee, Florida. It was founded in 1960 and is family owned. Established in Buffalo, New York, Science First relocated to Nassau County, Florida in 2009. The firm manufactures products ranging from microscopes to environmental testing kits and planetariums. Science First is co-owned by Nancy Bell (her father Franklin B. Lee founded the company) and her two sons (Aaron C. Bell and Nathaniel S. Bell). Bell's daughters hold an ownership stake.

Science First bought Learning Technologies, a Massachusetts-based company known for its Starlab product, in 2008. In 2010, Science First won a $2 million federal contract for portable planetariums (Digital Starlabs) for use in the teaching of the children of military personnel. In 2010 Science First bought Eastwind Enterprises, a Canadian science kit manufacturer. In August 2014, Science First acquired some of the assets of Maine-based, The Science Source. In July 2015, Science First purchased Cynmar, an Illinois-based scientific distributor. Cynmar has relocated to the Florida facility.
