= White Oak Conservation Center =

Wildlife and conservation center in Florida, US

Coordinates: 30.7304°N 81.7187°W

White Oak Conservation
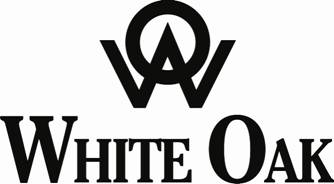
- Interactive map of White Oak Conservation
- Date opened: 1982
- Location: Yulee, Florida
- Land area: 69 square kilometers (27 square miles)
- No. of animals: 400+
- No. of species: 32
- Website: www.whiteoakwildlife.org

White Oak Conservation, which is part of Walter Conservation, is a 69 km^{2} (27 sq mi) conservation center in northeastern Florida. It is dedicated to the conservation of endangered and threatened species, including Indian rhinoceros, southern white rhinoceros, south-central black rhinoceros (also known as southern black rhinoceros), Asian elephants, giraffes, okapi, bongo antelope, zebras, dama gazelles, and cheetahs.

Through Walter Conservation, the Walter family conserves rare species and wild places around the world. Efforts include improving the quality of life of individual animals, recovering rare species, restoring ecosystems, and protecting wilderness areas. Thus far, their philanthropy protects important areas in North America and Africa, protecting important wild populations of African elephants, rhinos, lions, and many other species. The Walter Conservation approach is to protect and preserve large wild areas, provide wildlife security and management, to collaborate with local residents and host-country governments, and to invest in sustainable enterprises.

White Oak is well known in the conservation and zoo communities for its rhinoceros, cheetah, and okapi (a rare giraffe relative) programs and for its support of conservation in Africa, Asia, and the United States.

In March 2013, White Oak was purchased by Mark and Kimbra Walter. The Walters are conservationists who support wildlife programs across North America. White Oak operations and facilities are managed by White Oak Conservation Holdings LLC, which the Walters established for this purpose.

== Animals ==
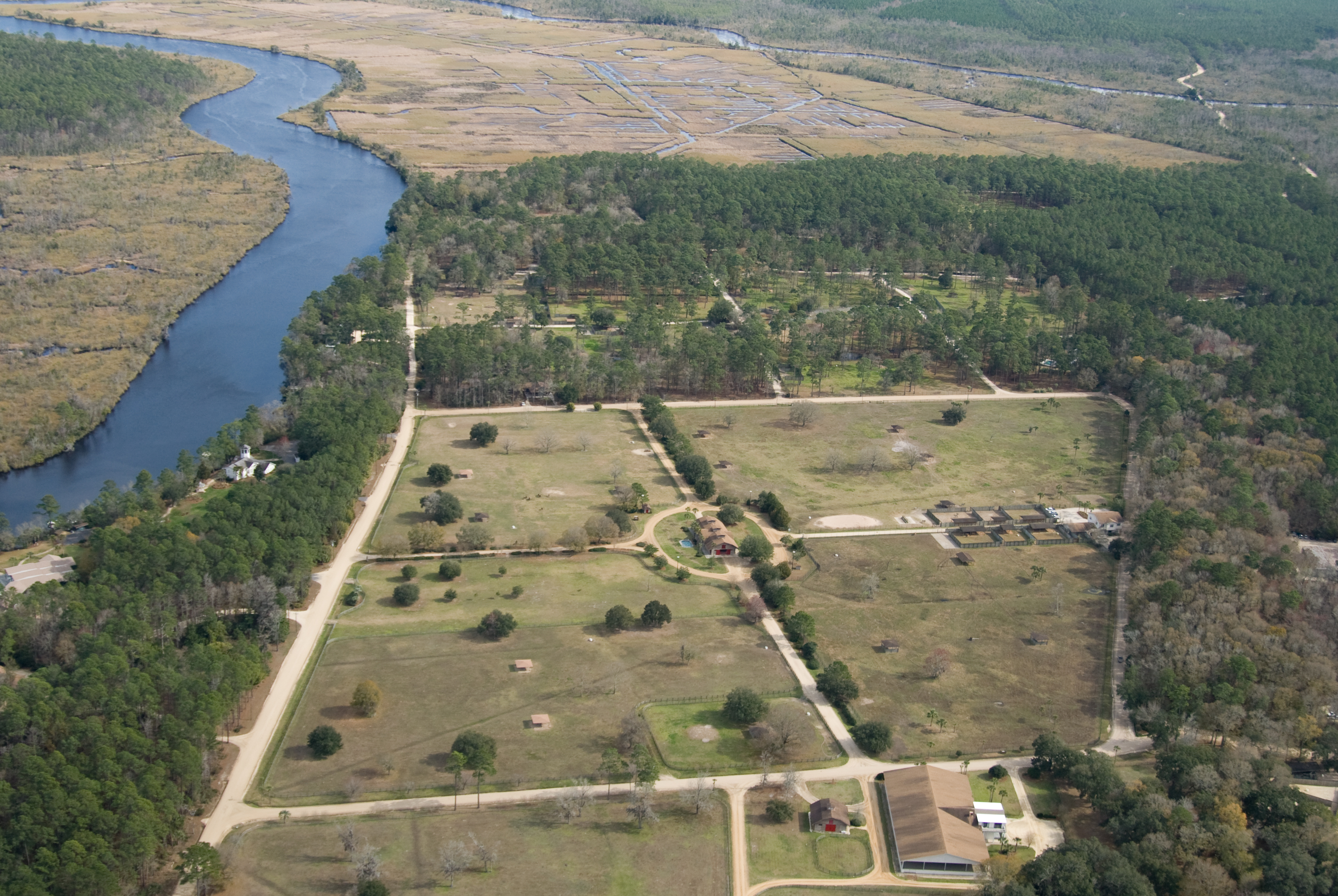
An aerial photo shows some of the animal habitats on the White Oak property. At left is the St. Marys River, which separates Georgia and Florida.

White Oak has been successful in breeding, researching, and conserving a wide variety of species. Almost all of the wild population decreases of the imperiled species conserved at the center can be attributed to habitat loss, farming, and poaching.

White Oak is prominent in the zoological world, providing offspring to conservation breeding programs throughout the U.S. and the world. White Oak also contributes to wildlife research and field conservation programs that have aided in the survival of several rare species.
