= Yulee, Florida =

Yulee
- Census-designated place
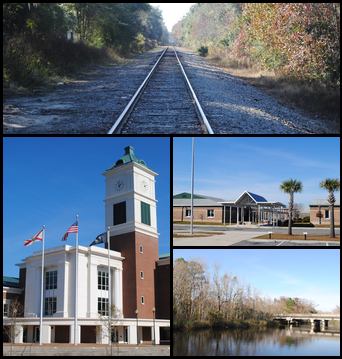
- Images from top, left to right: Railroad in Yulee, Robert M. Foster Justice Center, Yulee High School, tributary of the Nassau River

- Location in East Nassau County and the state of Florida
- Coordinates: 30°37′07″N 81°34′30″W
- Country: United States
- State: Florida
- County: Nassau

Area
  - Total: 23.18 sq mi (60.04 km^{2})
  - Land: 23.16 sq mi (59.98 km^{2})
  - Water: 0.023 sq mi (0.06 km^{2})
- Elevation: 7 ft (2.1 m)

Population (2020)
  - Total: 14,195
  - Density: 612.9/sq mi (236.65/km^{2})
- Time zone: UTC−5 (Eastern (EST))
  - Summer (DST): UTC−4 (EDT)
- ZIP codes: 32041, 32097
- Area codes: 904, 324
- FIPS code: 12-79175
- GNIS feature ID: 2403048

Yulee is a census-designated place (CDP) located within Nassau County, Florida, in the United States. Its population at the 2020 United States Census was 14,195, up from 11,491 at the 2010 census. It is part of the Jacksonville metropolitan statistical area. Yulee is a residential bedroom community for individuals commuting to Jacksonville, Naval Submarine Base Kings Bay, and various locations in Southeast Georgia.

Yulee is located within a 15-mile radius of Amelia Island, Jacksonville International Airport, Florida State College at Jacksonville's Nassau Center, White Oak Conservation, Florida Fish and Nassau Wildlife Management Area, Four Creeks State Forest, Yulee Branch Library, Nassau County Sheriff's Office Headquarters, and the Florida Welcome Center situated along Interstate 95 in Florida. The Yulee CDP is provided regional services by the Jacksonville Transportation Authority.

== History ==
A post office called Yulee has been in operation since 1893. The community of Yulee was named after David Levy Yulee, who was known for his role as the builder of the Florida Railroad, a significant railway in the state. Additionally, David Yulee served as a United States senator from Florida.

== Geography ==
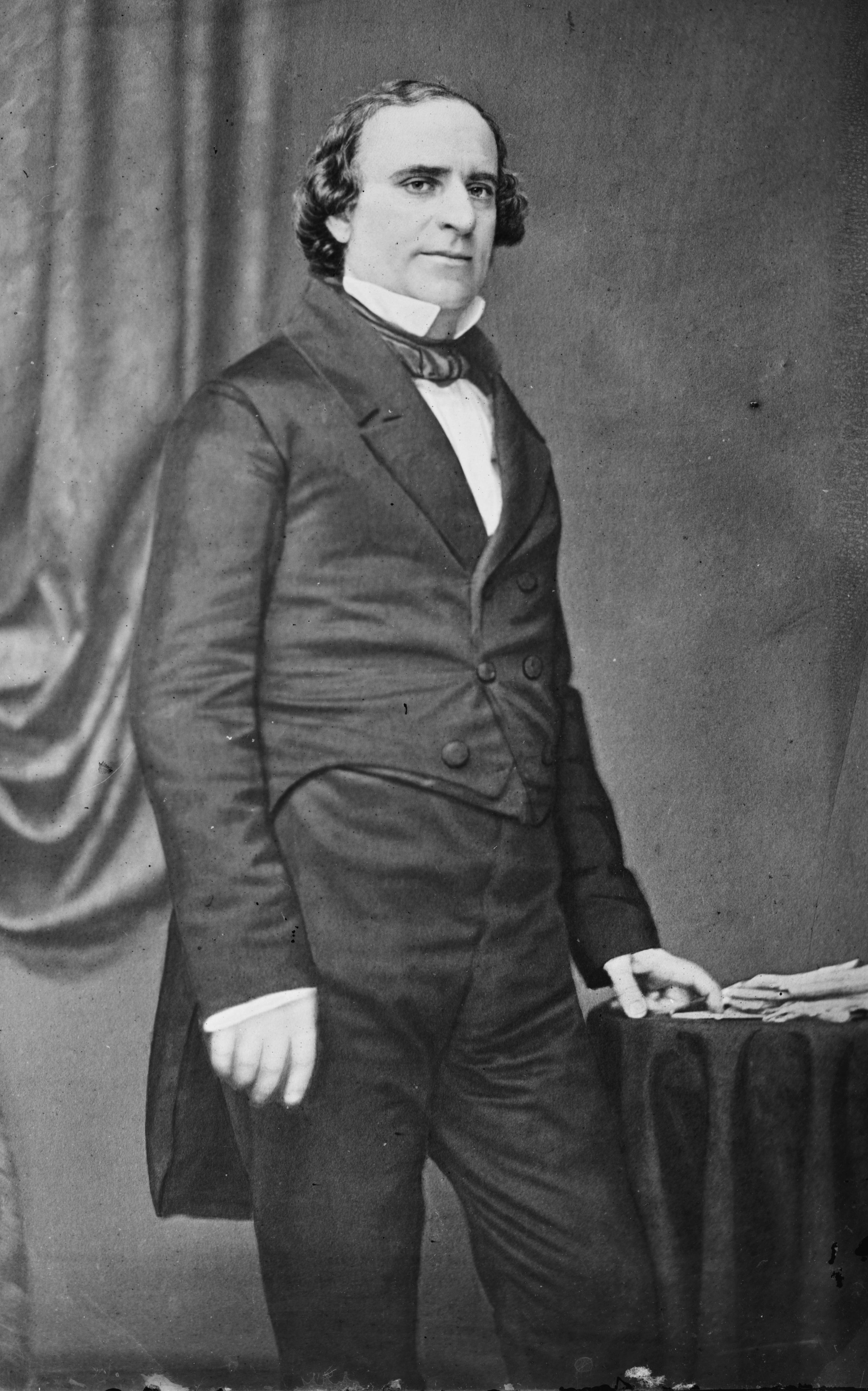
United States Senator David Levy Yulee, after whom Yulee is named.

According to the U.S. Census Bureau Population and Housing Counts report, the Yulee CDP has a total area of 23.18 sq mi (60.04 km^{2}). It is covered by the 904 and 324 area codes and the 32041 and 32097 ZIP codes.

Neighborhoods near the Yulee CDP and/or CCD include:

- Blackmon/Haddock
- Blackrock
- Chester
- Flood Acres
- Heron Isles
- Hickory Village
- Hideaway and Pinewood Pointe
- Lofton Oaks
- Meadowfield Bluffs
- North Hampton
- Pirate's Wood
- Plummers Creek
- River Glen
- Roses Bluff
- Timber Creek Plantation
- Wilson Neck
- Yulee Hills
- WildLight

== Demographics ==
Historical population
Census	Pop.	Note	%±
1990	6,915		—
2000	8,392		21.4%
2010	11,491		36.9%
2020	14,195		23.5%

=== 2020 census ===
As of the 2020 census, Yulee had a population of 14,195. The median age was 41.0 years. 22.4% of residents were under the age of 18 and 17.5% of residents were 65 years of age or older. For every 100 females there were 98.8 males, and for every 100 females age 18 and over there were 94.9 males age 18 and over.

Yulee had a population density of 613 per square mile (237/km^{2}). The 5,754 housing units had an average density of 248 per square mile (96/km^{2}).

93.0% of residents lived in urban areas, while 7.0% lived in rural areas.

There were 5,419 households in Yulee, of which 32.3% had children under the age of 18 living in them. Of all households, 55.0% were married-couple households, 16.1% were households with a male householder and no spouse or partner present, and 22.3% were households with a female householder and no spouse or partner present. About 20.4% of all households were made up of individuals and 9.0% had someone living alone who was 65 years of age or older. The average household size was 2.96.

There were 5,754 housing units, of which 5.8% were vacant. The homeowner vacancy rate was 1.8% and the rental vacancy rate was 7.2%.

Racial composition as of the 2020 census
Race	Number	Percent
White	11,864	83.6%
Black or African American	801	5.6%
American Indian and Alaska Native	50	0.4%
Asian	179	1.3%
Native Hawaiian and Other Pacific Islander	10	0.1%
Some other race	251	1.8%
Two or more races	1,040	7.3%
Hispanic or Latino (of any race)	811	5.7%

=== Income and poverty ===
The median income for a household in the CDP was $79,818, and for a family was $87,566. About 12.0% of the population was below the poverty line, including 18.3% of those under 18 and 8.8% of those 65 or over.

== Climate ==
Similar to many areas in the southern Atlantic region of the United States, Yulee experiences a humid subtropical climate, characterized by mild winters and hot, humid summers, designated as Köppen Cfa. The region typically receives concentrated rainfall during the warmest months, from May through September, while the driest period occurs between November and April. Yulee's geographical location near the coast and its lower latitude contribute to minimal cold weather, resulting in generally mild and sunny winters.

Climate data for Nassau County, Florida
Month	Jan	Feb	Mar	Apr	May	Jun	Jul	Aug	Sep	Oct	Nov	Dec	Year
Mean daily maximum °F (°C)	62.0 (16.7)	65.8 (18.8)	71.2 (21.8)	76.8 (24.9)	83.3 (28.5)	88.0 (31.1)	90.6 (32.6)	89.3 (31.8)	85.6 (29.8)	79.2 (26.2)	72.2 (22.3)	64.9 (18.3)	77.5 (25.3)
Daily mean °F (°C)	53.8 (12.1)	56.5 (13.6)	61.9 (16.6)	67.7 (19.8)	75.0 (23.9)	80.4 (26.9)	82.6 (28.1)	82.1 (27.8)	79.2 (26.2)	72.1 (22.3)	63.9 (17.7)	56.3 (13.5)	69.3 (20.7)
Mean daily minimum °F (°C)	44.5 (6.9)	47.2 (8.4)	52.6 (11.4)	58.6 (14.8)	66.7 (19.3)	72.8 (22.7)	74.6 (23.7)	74.9 (23.8)	72.8 (22.7)	65.0 (18.3)	55.6 (13.1)	47.6 (8.7)	61.1 (16.2)
Average precipitation inches (mm)	3.42 (87)	3.20 (81)	3.92 (100)	2.82 (72)	2.31 (59)	5.27 (134)	5.52 (140)	5.82 (148)	6.91 (176)	4.59 (117)	2.08 (53)	2.95 (75)	48.81 (1,240)
Average precipitation days (≥ 0.01 in)	9.1	8.4	8.4	5.9	6.0	11.5	11.9	12.5	11.8	8.1	7.3	8.2	109.1
Source: NOAA (1981-2010 Normals)

== Economy ==
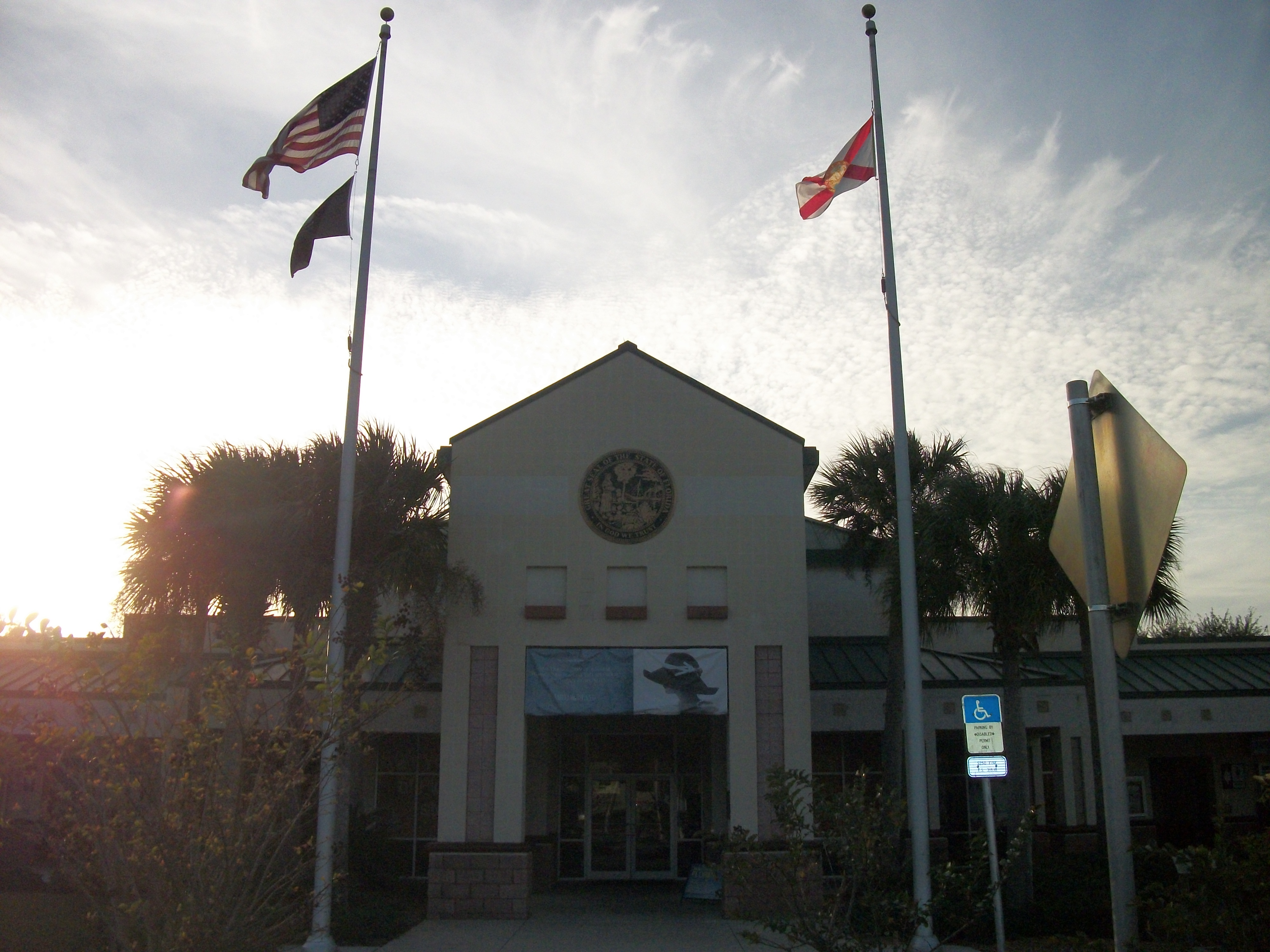
The Florida Welcome Center north of Yulee, off Interstate 95

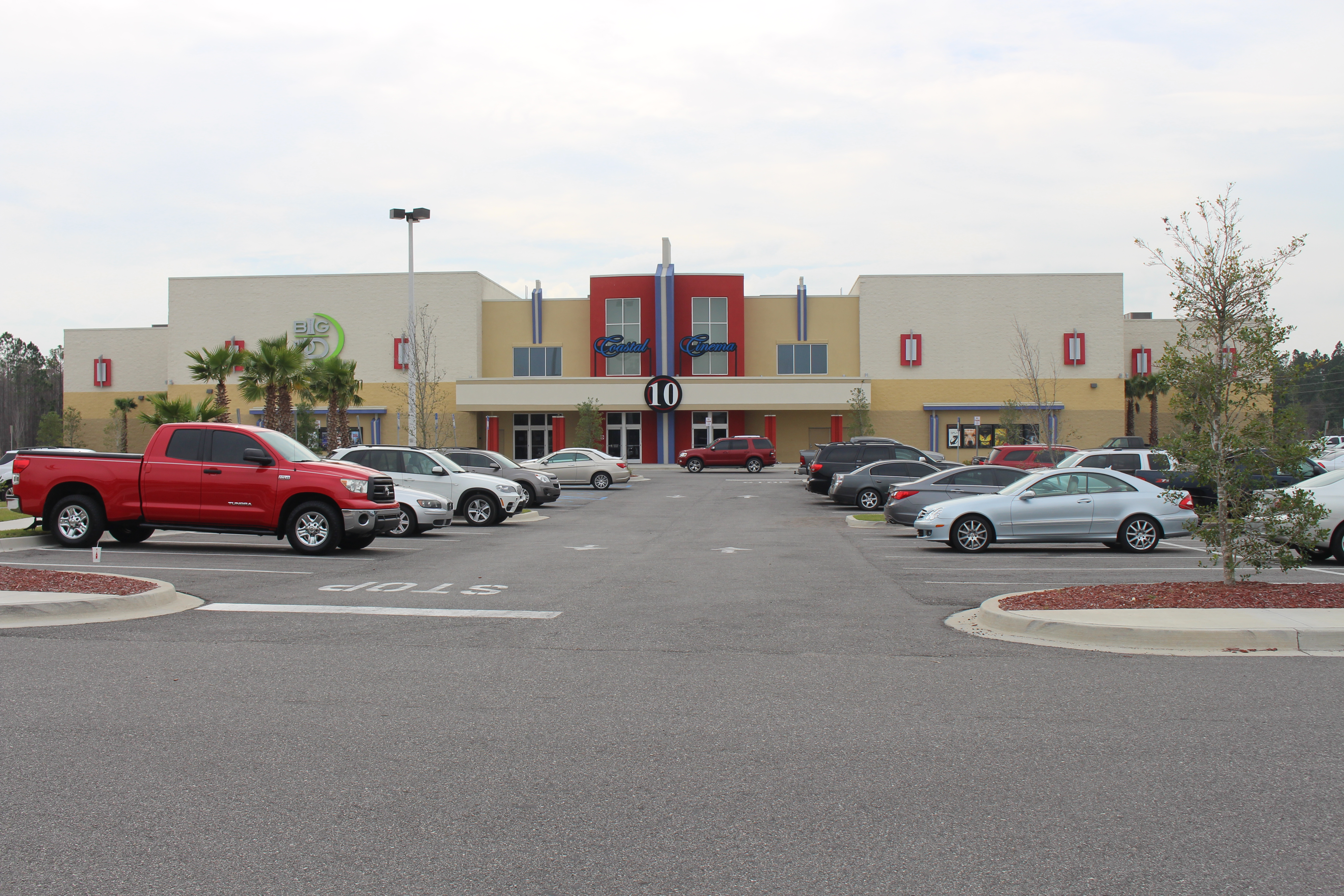
Coastal Cinema 10 in Yulee

Yulee hosts several outdoor festivals and events, with the most notable being the annual Holiday Festival and Parade. Additionally, the area boasts a variety of dining establishments, including restaurants, cafes, and a selection of bars. During the evenings, Yulee provides a nightlife scene that attracts a diverse range of patrons, including local residents, young professionals, college students from the nearby institutions, and tourists. Furthermore, Yulee features a sports complex and gymnasium to cater to recreational and fitness needs.

Yulee is home to two world-class golf courses (both 18-hole, par 72): The Golf Club at North Hampton was designed in part by Arnold Palmer, and is over 7,100 yards. Additionally, the Amelia National Golf and Country Club was designed by Tom Fazio.

Yulee serves as the headquarters for the Nassau County Economic Development Board, responsible for promoting Nassau County as an attractive destination for business relocation or expansion. The Nassau County Sheriff's Office is also headquartered in Yulee. In November 2017, the University of Florida announced it would be building two health and fitness facilities. In January 2018 the large energy company Florida Public Utilities announced that it will be relocating to Yulee and will be building a new 55,000-sq-ft corporate headquarters.

The Florida Welcome Center located in northern Yulee is a "tourist information house", located near the Florida/Georgia state line on I-95. This center provides incoming visitors with a variety of information on travel, highways, sports, climate, accommodations, cities, outdoor recreation, and attractions. In tribute to the citrus industry (which historically has been a major part of Florida's economy), every visitor is offered a free cup of Florida citrus juice (orange or grapefruit).

In 2017, Rayonier established a new corporate headquarters within the Yulee Census County Division. Additionally, Rayonier outlined plans for the development of a 24,000-acre pine forest in Yulee, envisioning a comprehensive community encompassing residential areas, office spaces, medical facilities, shopping centers, light industrial facilities, and educational institutions. This development initiative, initially spanning 4,200 acres, is known as Wildlight. In collaboration with Nassau County, Rayonier worked with the county in the development of the Wildlight Elementary School, with an estimated cost of $26 million. The school commenced operations at the beginning of the 2017–2018 academic year and accommodated over 600 students.

== Local government ==
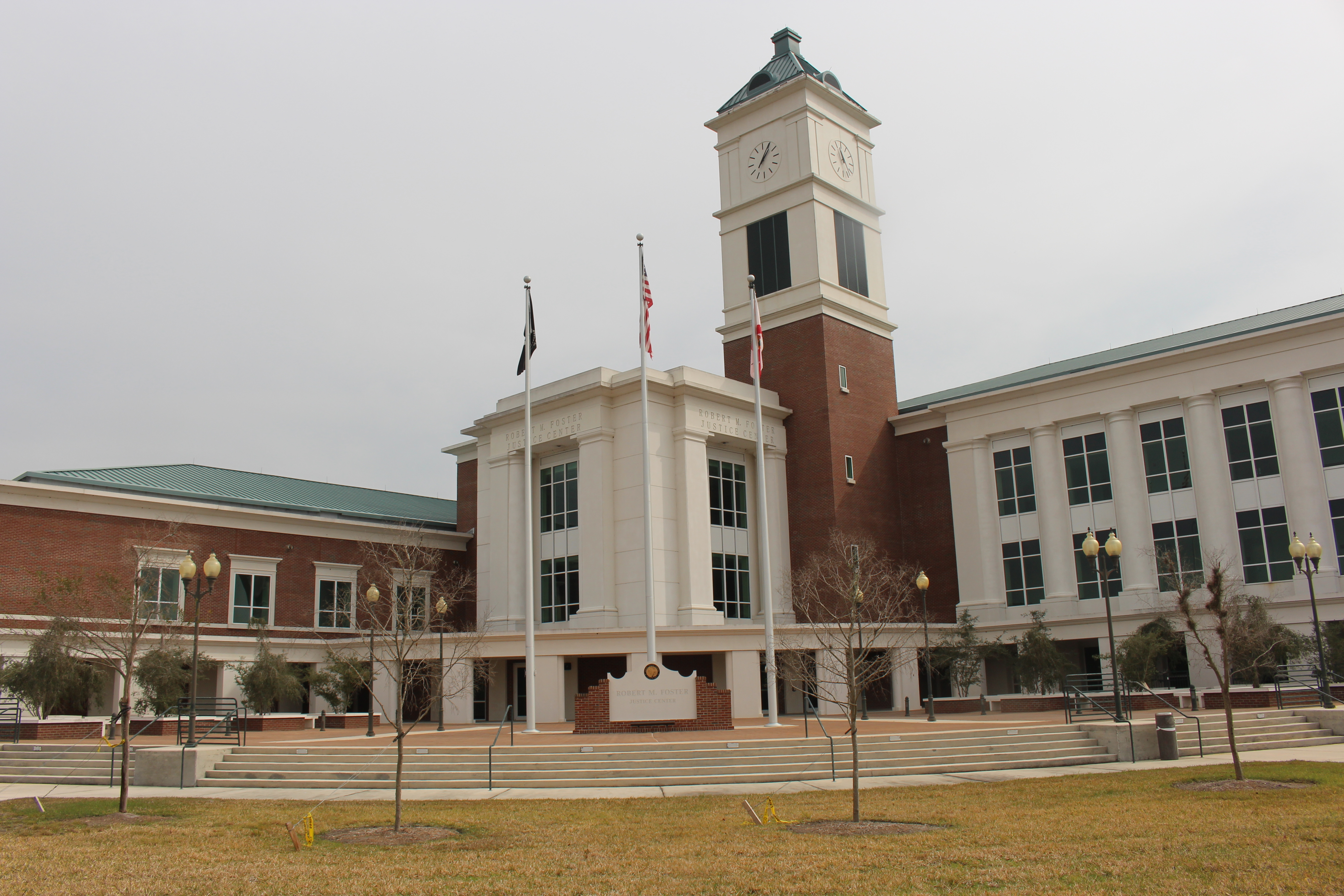
Robert M. Foster Justice Center

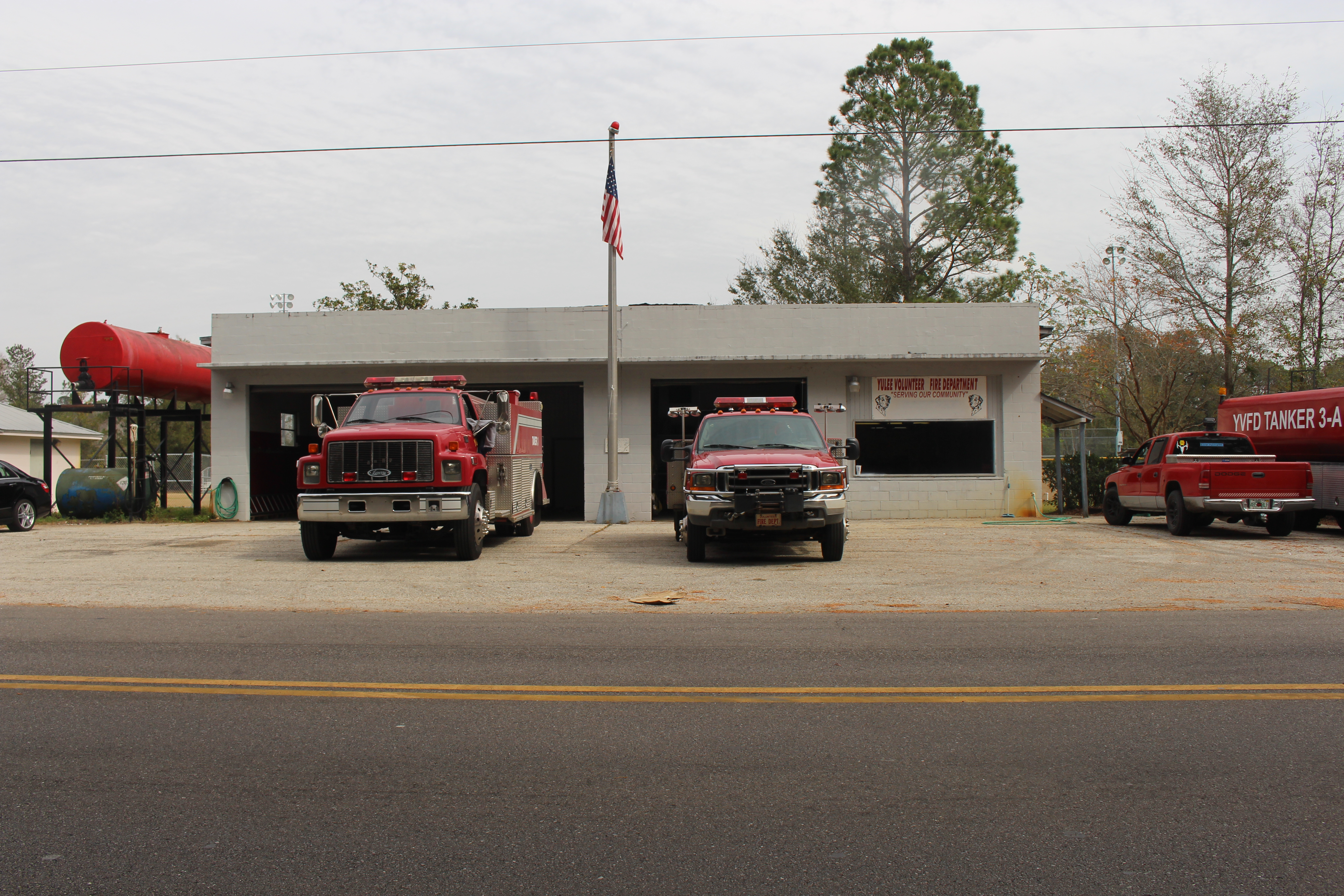
Yulee Volunteer Fire Department

=== Fire and rescue ===
The Yulee CDP is served by its own fire department and two additional regional fire stations, the all-career Nassau County Fire Rescue Stations 30 and 70. The Yulee Volunteer Fire Department is dispatched along with the county department to all fire calls in the Yulee area.

=== Police services ===
The Nassau County Sheriff's Office serves the residents of the Yulee CDP and Nassau County, Florida. Their primary responsibilities include upholding the Florida Constitution, enforcing state laws and statutes, and ensuring the safety, security, and welfare of the community. These objectives are achieved through law enforcement services, the management of the Nassau County Jail and Detention Center, and the provision of court security. The headquarters of the Nassau County Sheriff's Office is situated at 76001 Bobby Moore Circle, Yulee, FL 32097.

=== Judicial complex ===
The Robert M. Foster Justice Center, formerly referred to as the Nassau County, Florida Judicial Complex, is situated in Yulee. It was inaugurated in 2004 with the purpose of supplementing the historic Nassau County Courthouse situated in Fernandina Beach, Florida. This facility spans over 111,000 sq ft in size and involved an expenditure of more than $20 million for its construction.

== Education ==
=== Higher education ===
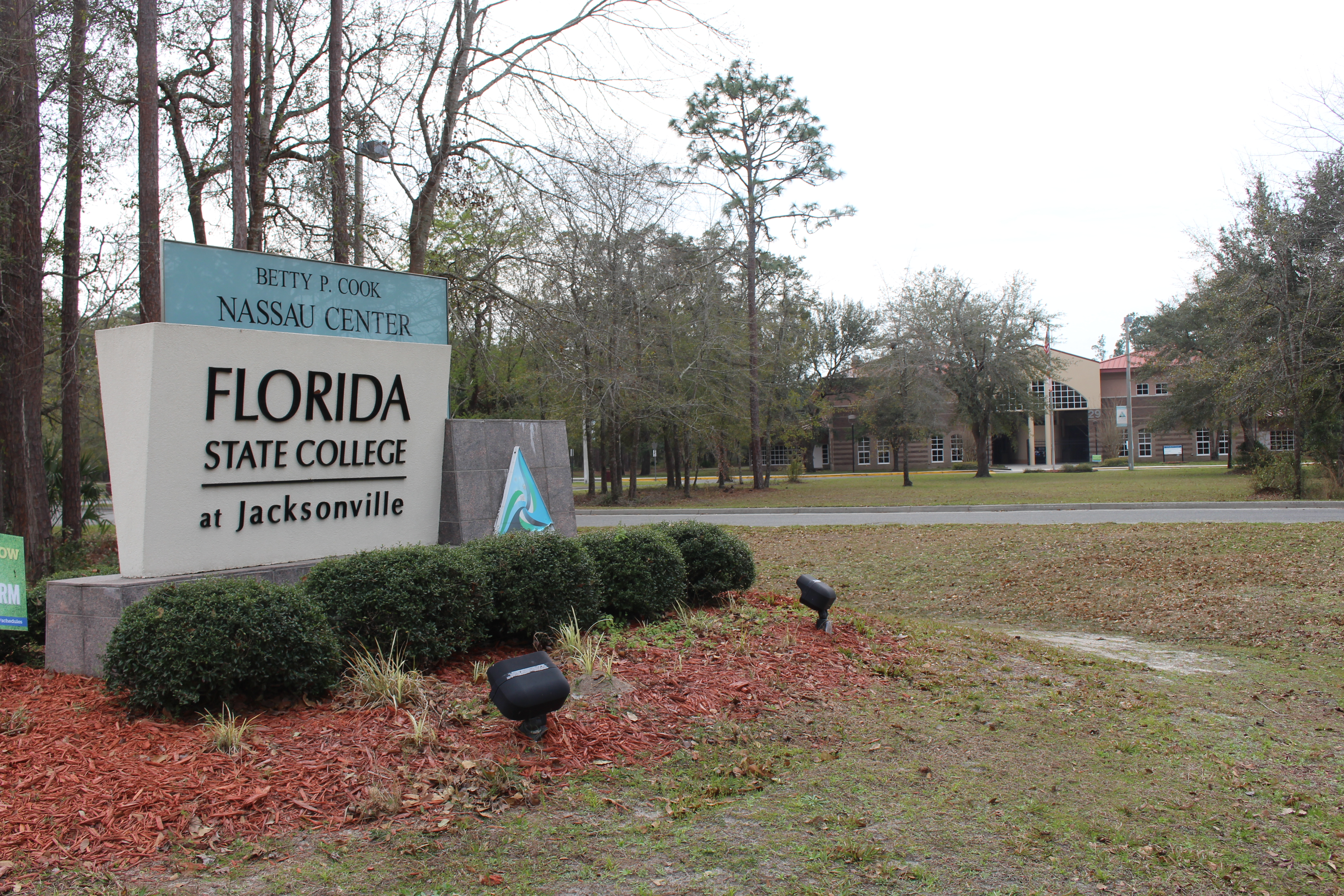
Florida State College at Jacksonville Nassau Center

Florida State College at Jacksonville (FSCJ), accredited by the Southern Association of Colleges and Schools, operates the Betty P. Cook Nassau Center in Yulee. FSCJ is part of the Florida College System. This campus serves Nassau County residents, providing a range of academic offerings, including courses, certificates, and degree programs across various fields. Notably, this campus houses FSCJ's 16-acre Outdoor Education Center, a natural space.

Also in the area are the University of North Florida and Jacksonville University in Jacksonville.

==== Library ====
The Yulee Branch Library of the Nassau County Public Library System is situated within the Nassau Campus of FSCJ in Yulee.

=== K-12 education ===
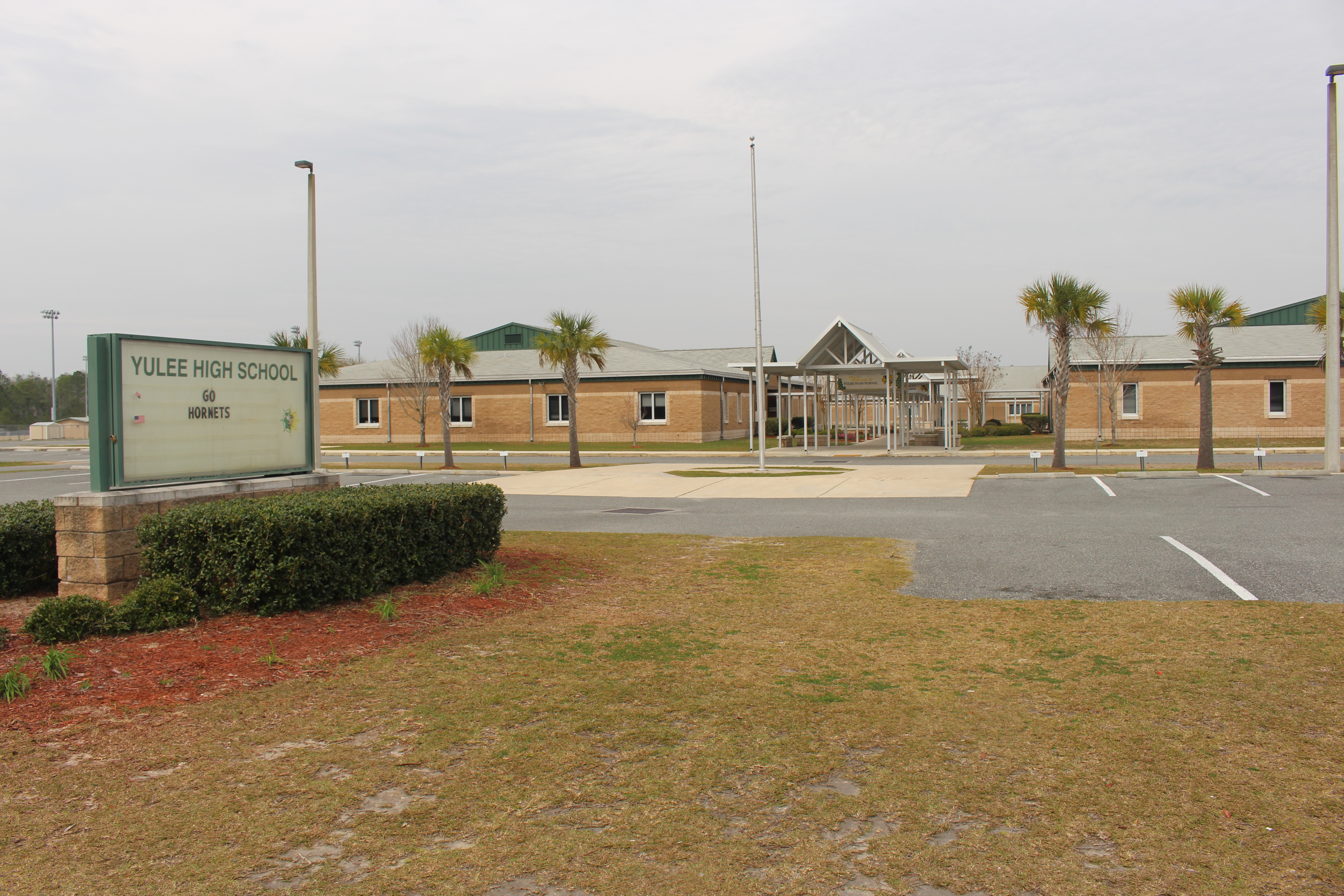
Yulee High School

Public primary and secondary schools in Yulee and Nassau County are administered by Nassau County Public Schools system, which is governed by a six-member Nassau County School Board. In total, 22 total schools comprise the Nassau County Public Schools and the system as of 2025 enrolls 12,746 students.

Public secondary schools:

- Yulee High School (grades 9-12)
- Yulee Middle (grades 6-8)

Public primary schools:

- Wildlight Elementary School (Kindergarten-5 and ESE)
- Yulee Elementary (grades 3-5)
- Yulee Primary (prekindergarten-grade 2)

Private schools:

- Faith Christian Academy (prekindergarten-grade 12)
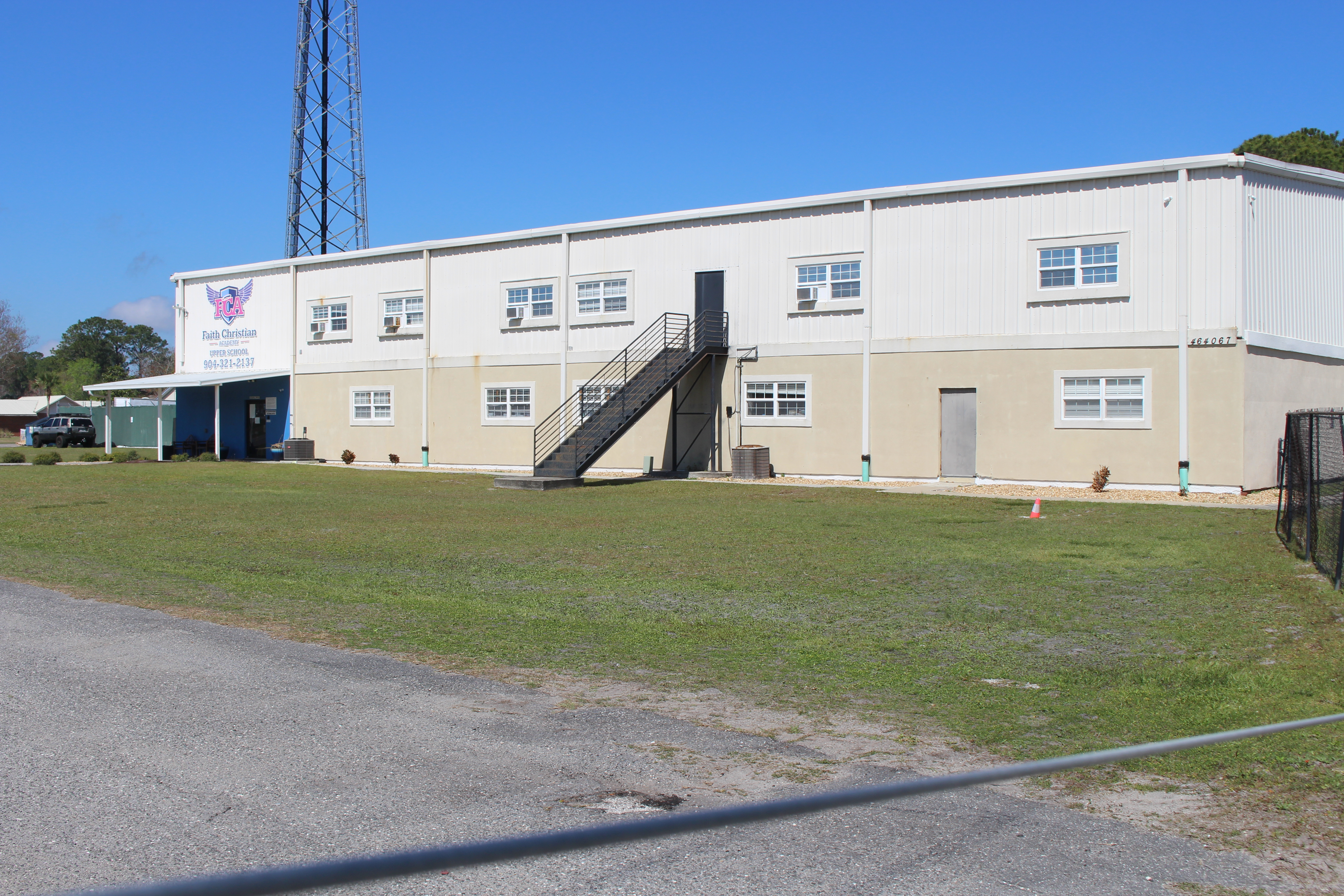
Faith Christian Academy

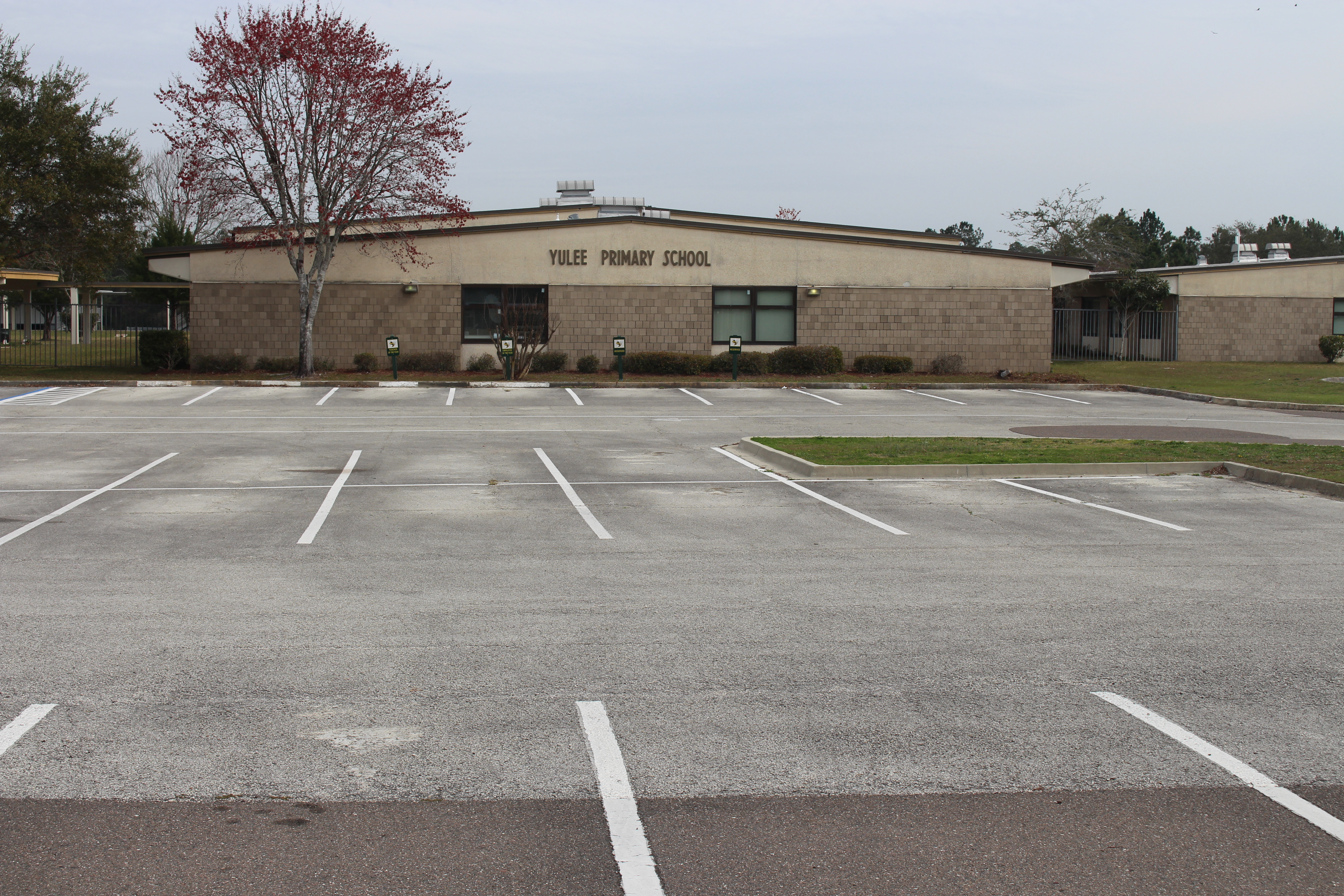
Yulee Primary School

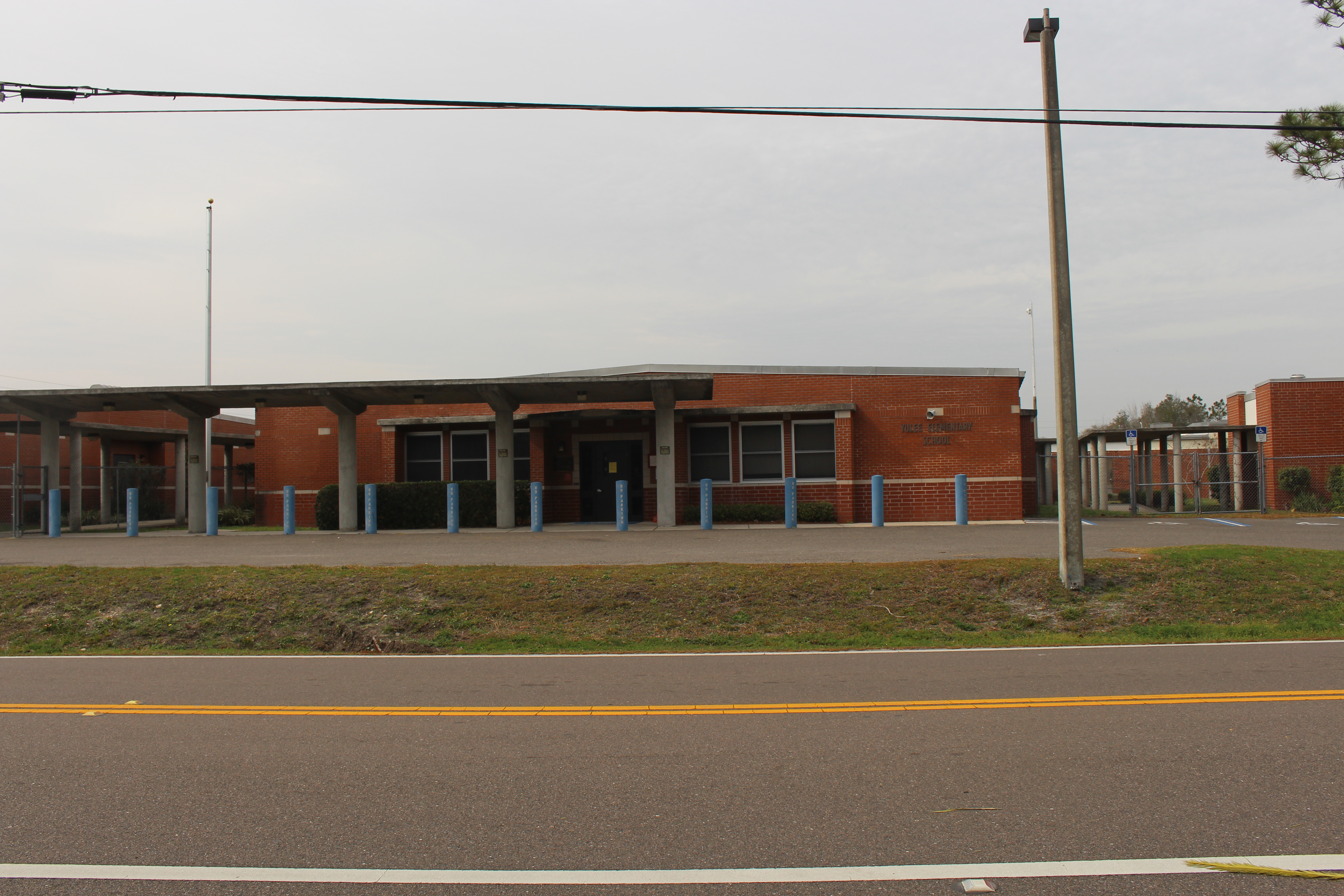
Yulee Elementary School

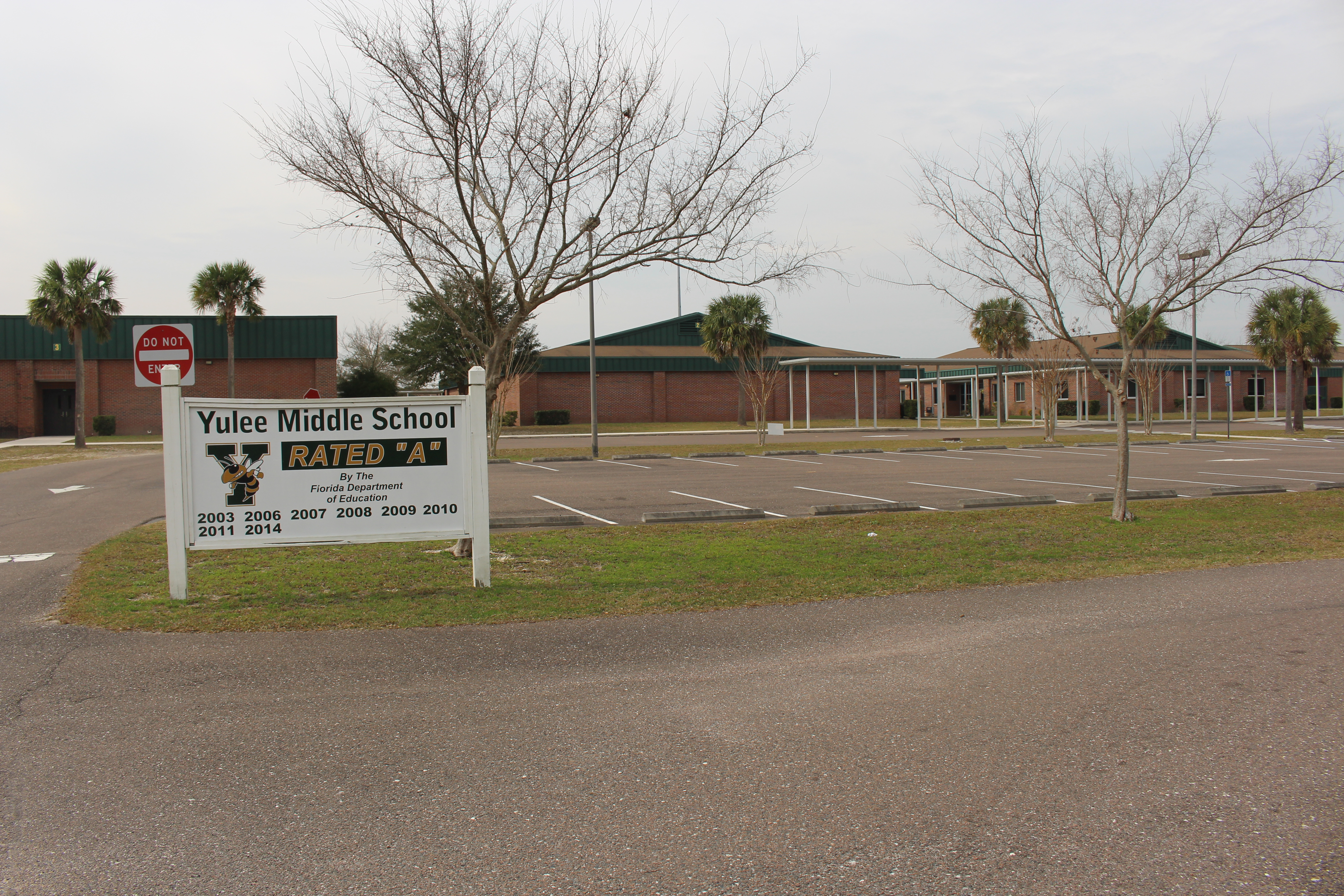
Yulee Middle School

=== Continuing education ===
Yulee provides adult education in a variety of subjects at the FSCJ Nassau Center and at the Yulee Public Library.

== Healthcare ==
Fourteen hospitals are in or near the Yulee CDP.

== Parks ==
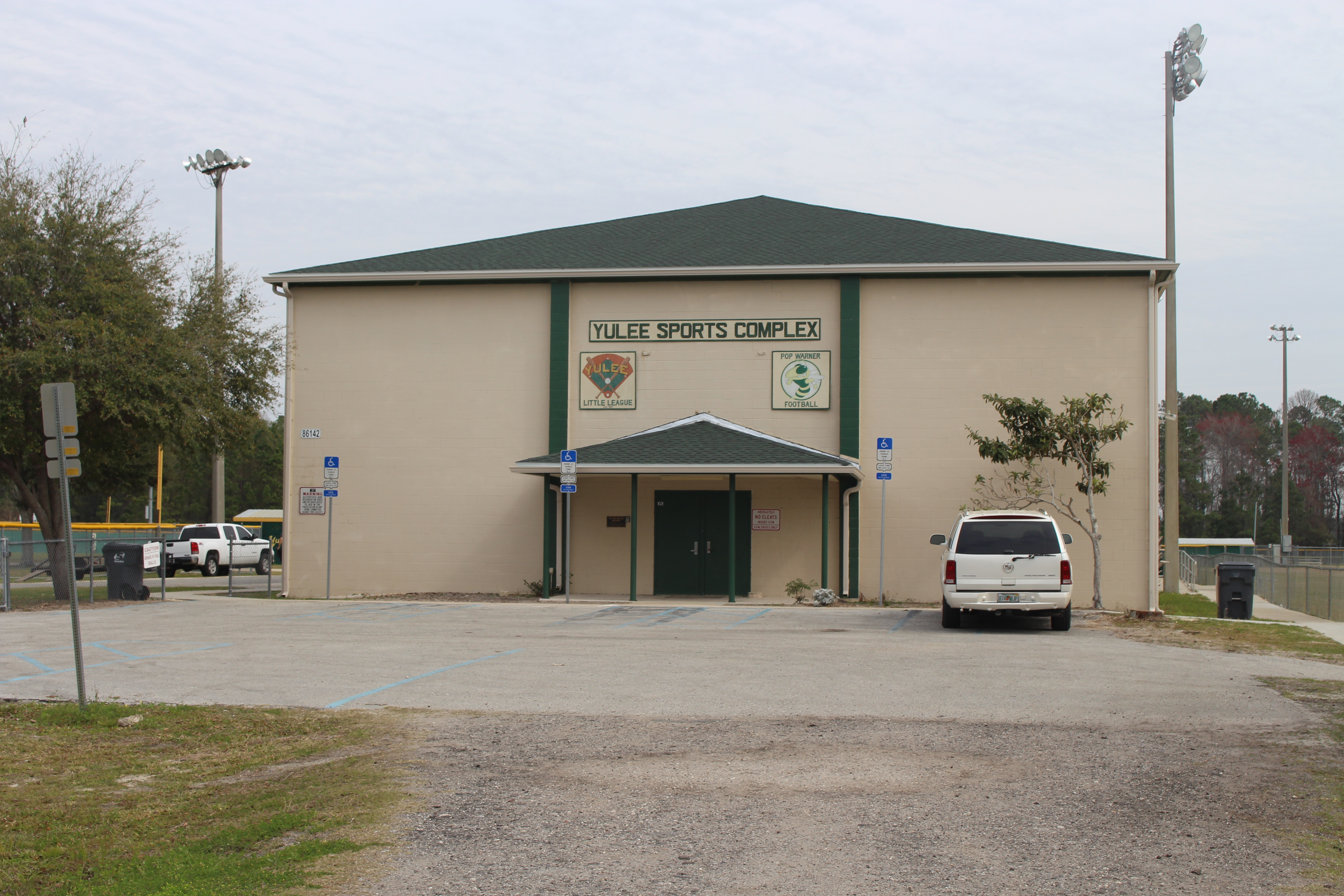
Yulee Sports Complex

Yulee showcases three separate parks:

- Goffinsville Nassau River Park and Boat Ramp provides amenities such as fishing, parking, pavilions, recreational areas, restroom facilities, and places for picnics.
- John Muir Ecological Park features a quarter-mile trail commemorating John Muir's 1867 journey across Florida.
- Yulee Sports Complex and Gymnasium encompasses lighted baseball and softball fields, football fields, a designated structure, parking facilities, play equipment, restroom accommodations, picnic tables, and tennis and basketball courts.

== Notable people ==
- George Crady (b. 1931) is a politician and former member of the Florida House of Representatives.
- Kyle Denney (b. 1977) is a former Major League Baseball (MLB) pitcher for the Cleveland Indians.
- Derrick Henry - (b. 1994) is a Heisman Trophy-winning football running back playing for the Baltimore Ravens.
- Apple Pope is a professional rugby player who currently plays for the United States national rugby league team.
- D. J. Stewart (b. 1993) is an MLB outfielder who played for the New York Mets, Baltimore Orioles, and the Pittsburgh Pirates.
- Zack Taylor - (1898–1974) was a professional baseball player and manager for the St. Louis Browns.
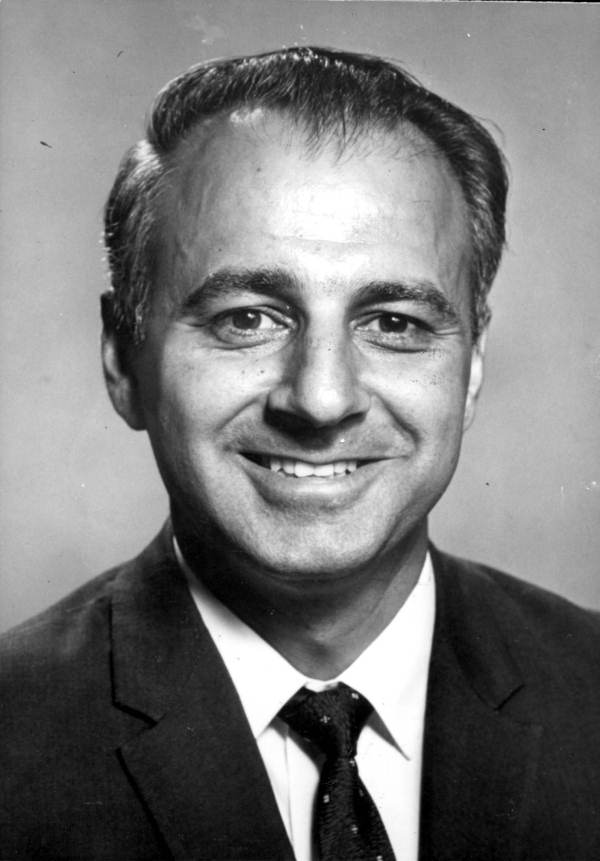
George Crady

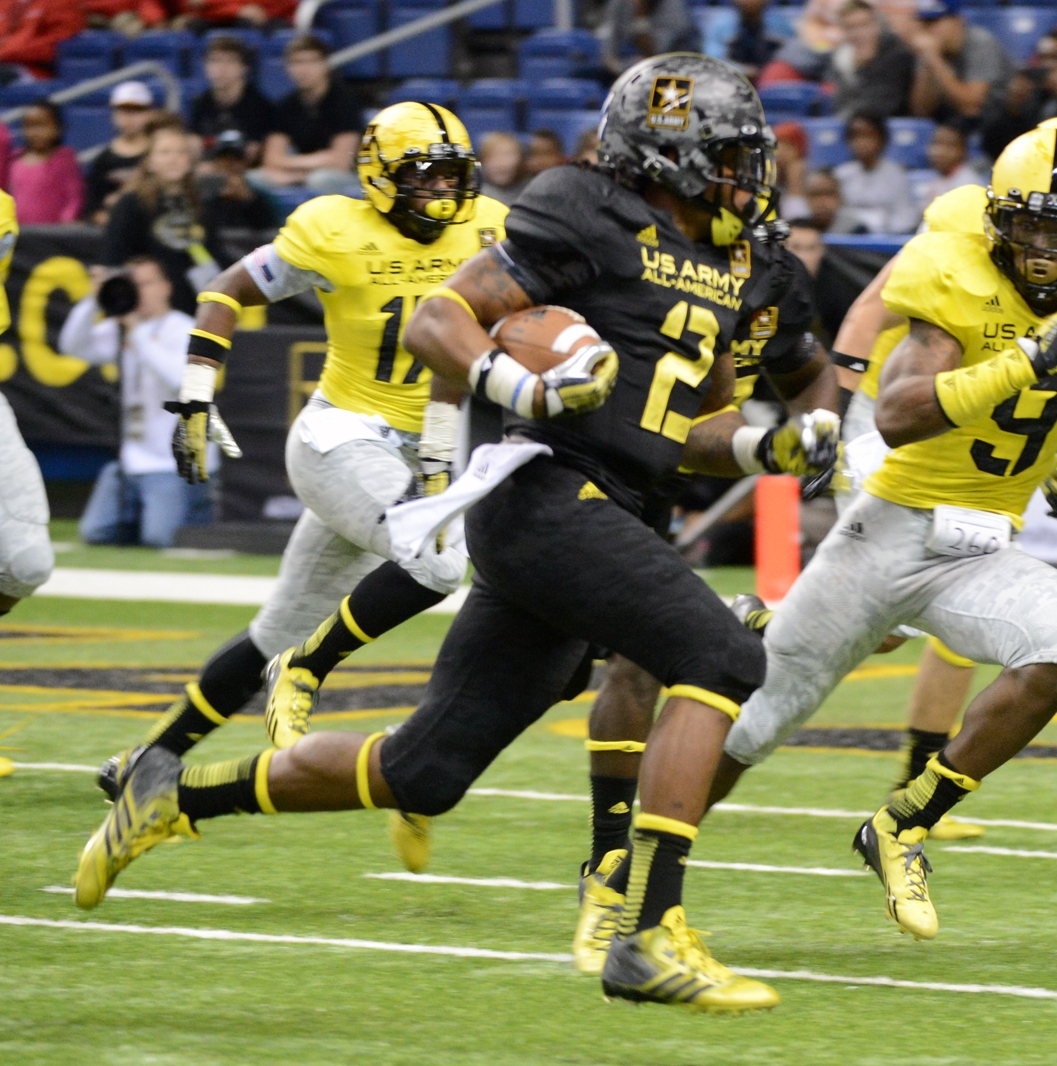
Derrick Henry

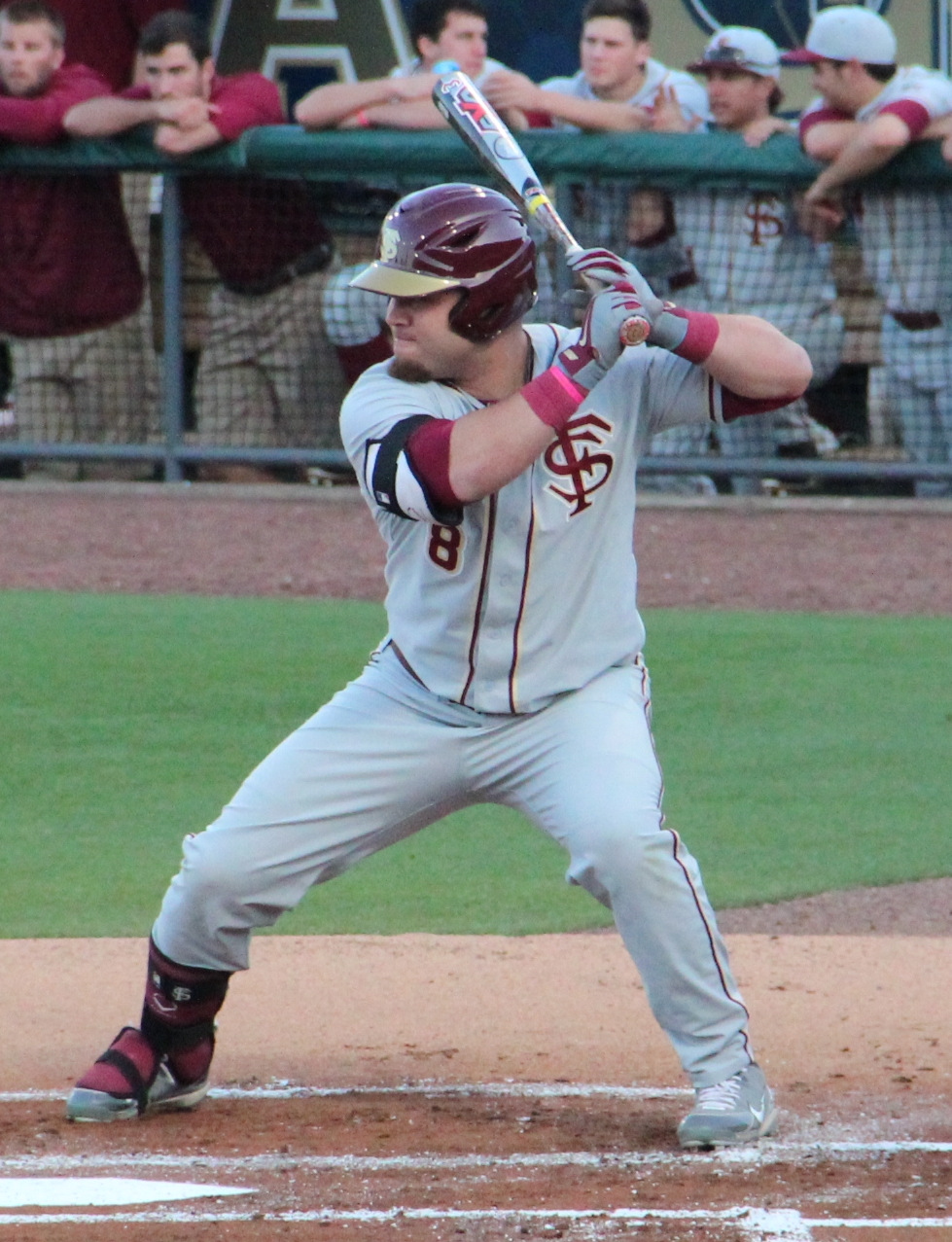
D. J. Stewart

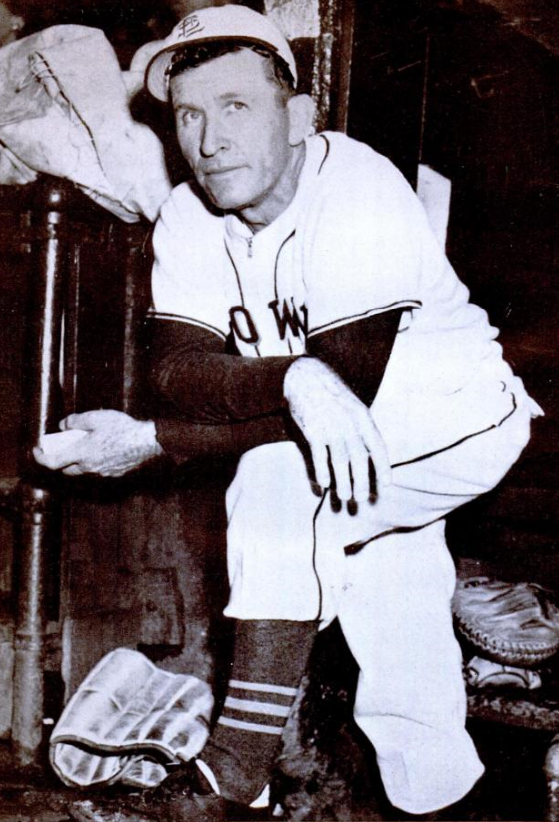
Zack Taylor

== See also ==
- First Coast
- First Coast Commuter Rail
- Florida State College at Jacksonville
- Florida Welcome Center
- Jacksonville Transportation Authority
- Nassau County, Florida
- Nassau County School District
- Nassau County Soil and Water Conservation District
- Science First
- White Oak Conservation
- White Oak Golf Course

== Gallery ==
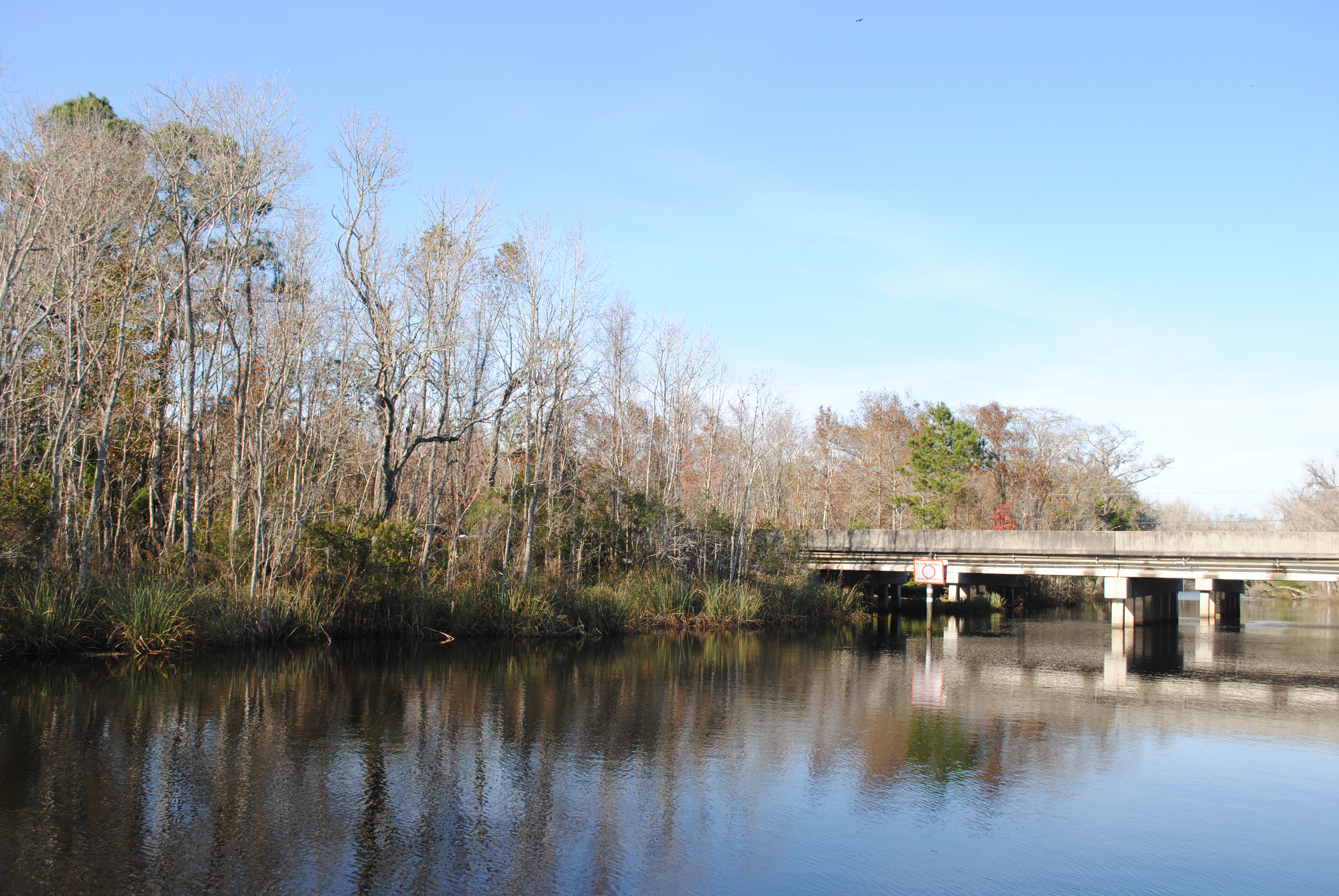
Nassau River in Yulee

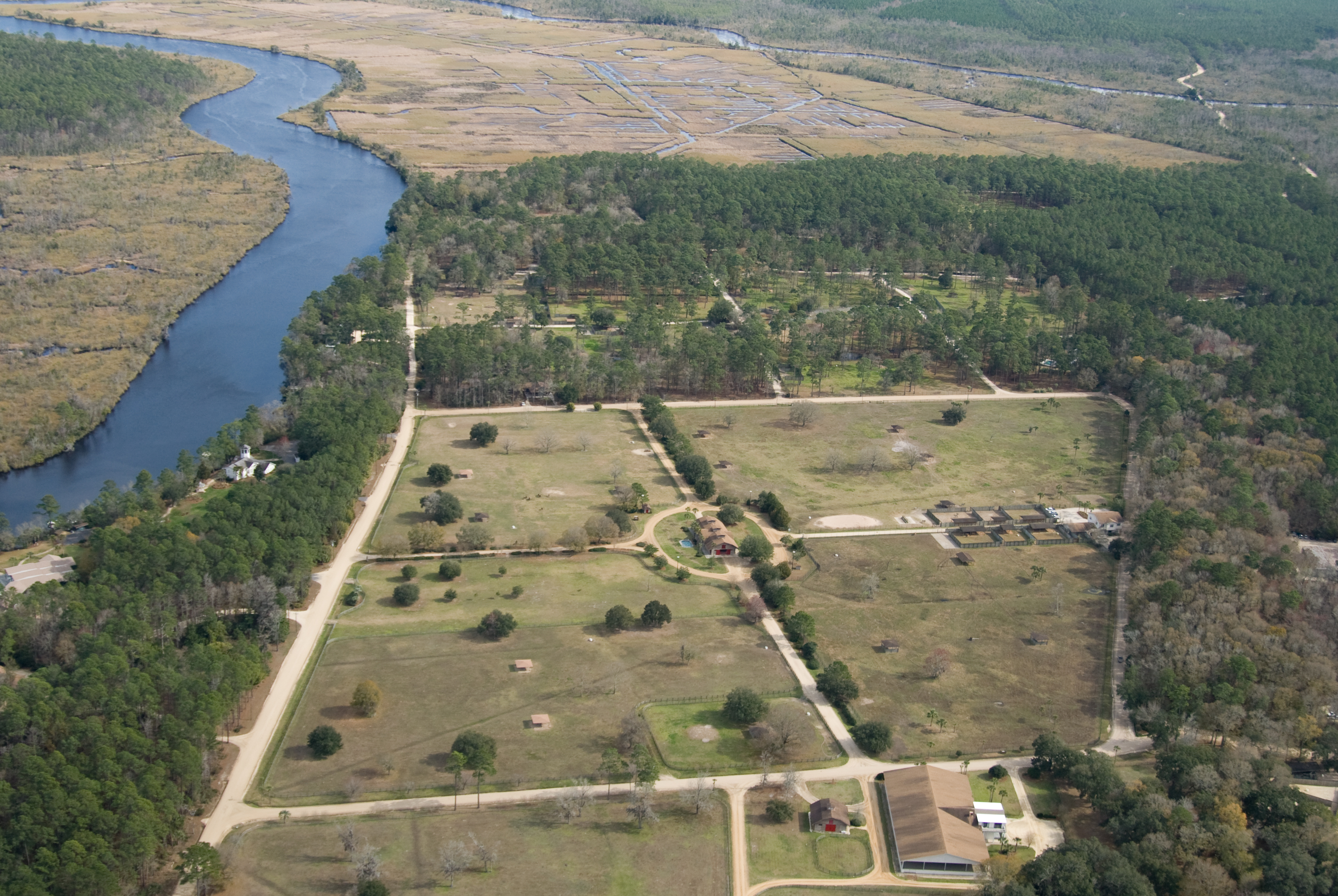
White Oak Conservation

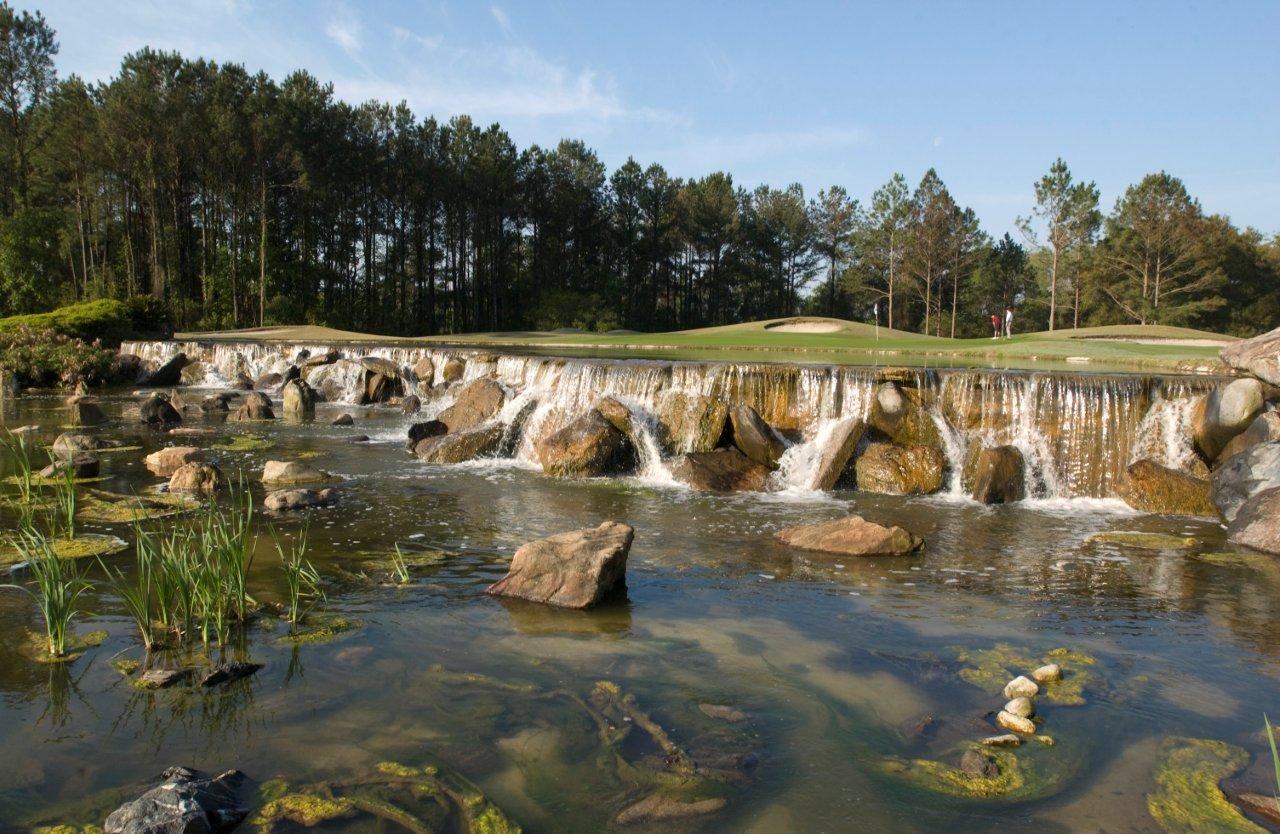
White Oak Golf Course
